= List of American films of 1996 =

American films of 1996

This is a list of American films released in 1996.

== Box office ==
The highest-grossing American films released in 1996, by domestic box office gross revenue, are as follows:

Highest-grossing films of 1996
Rank	Title	Distributor	Domestic gross
1	Independence Day	20th Century Fox	$306,169,268
2	Twister	Warner Bros.	$241,721,524
3	Mission: Impossible	Paramount Pictures	$180,981,856
4	Jerry Maguire	Sony Pictures	$153,952,592
5	Ransom	Disney	$136,492,681
6	101 Dalmatians	Disney	$136,189,294
7	The Rock	Disney	$134,069,511
8	The Nutty Professor	Universal Pictures	$128,814,019
9	The Birdcage	MGM	$124,060,553
10	A Time to Kill	Warner Bros.	$108,766,007

== January–March ==
Opening		Title	Production company	Cast and crew	Ref.
J A N U A R Y	12	Bio-Dome	Metro-Goldwyn-Mayer / Motion Picture Corporation of America	Jason Bloom (director); Adam Leff, Mitchell Peck, Jason Blumenthal (screenplay); Pauly Shore, Stephen Baldwin, William Atherton, Joey Adams, Teresa Hill, Rose McGowan, Kylie Minogue, Dara Tomanovich, Henry Gibson, Patricia Hearst, Roger Clinton, Taylor Negron, Jeremy Jordan, Channon Roe, Trevor St. John, Denise Dowse, Butch McCain, Ben McCain, Jack Black, Kyle Gass, Phil LaMarr, Paul Eiding, Phil Proctor, Kevin West, Rodger Bumpass	
J A N U A R Y	12	Don't Be a Menace to South Central While Drinking Your Juice in the Hood	Miramax Films / Island Pictures	Paris Barclay (director); Shawn Wayans, Marlon Wayans, Phil Beauman (screenplay); Shawn Wayans, Marlon Wayans, Vivica A. Fox, Lahmard Tate, Helen Martin, Chris Spencer, Suli McCullough, Tracey Cherelle Jones, Isaiah Barnes, Darrell Heath, Antonio Fargas, Bernie Mac, Terri J. Vaughn, Benjamin N. Everitt, Keith Morris, Keenan Ivory Wayans, LaWanda Page	
J A N U A R Y	12	Dunston Checks In	20th Century Fox	Ken Kwapis (director); John Hopkins, Bruce Graham (screenplay); Jason Alexander, Faye Dunaway, Eric Lloyd, Rupert Everett, Glenn Shadix, Paul Reubens, Graham Sack, Nathan Davis, Jennifer Bassey, Bob Bergen, Frank Welker, Sam the Orangutan, Bree Turner	
J A N U A R Y	12	Eye for an Eye	Paramount Pictures	John Schlesinger (director); Amanda Silver, Rick Jaffa (screenplay); Sally Field, Kiefer Sutherland, Ed Harris, Beverly D'Angelo, Joe Mantegna, Paul McCrane, Olivia Burnette, Alexandra Kyle, Darrell Larson, Charlayne Woodard, Philip Baker Hall, William Mesnik, Rondi Reed, Keith David, Donal Logue, Grand L. Bush, Armin Shimerman, Nicholas Cascone, Ross Bagley, Cynthia Rothrock, Stella Garcia	
J A N U A R Y	12	Lawnmower Man 2: Beyond Cyberspace	New Line Cinema	Farhad Mann (director/screenplay); Patrick Bergin, Matt Frewer, Austin O'Brien, Ely Pouget, Kevin Conway, Camille Cooper, Patrick LaBrecque, Crystal Celeste Grant, Sean P. Young, Mathew Valencia, Trevor O'Brien, Richard Fancy, Ellis Williams, Castulo Guerra, Molly Shannon	
J A N U A R Y	12	Two If by Sea	Warner Bros. Pictures / Morgan Creek Productions	Bill Bennett (director); Mike Armstrong, Denis Leary (screenplay); Sandra Bullock, Denis Leary, Stephen Dillane, Yaphet Kotto, Mike Starr, Jonathan Tucker, Wayne Robson, Michael Badalucco, Lenny Clarke	
J A N U A R Y	17	From Dusk till Dawn	Dimension Films	Robert Rodriguez (director); Quentin Tarantino (screenplay); George Clooney, Quentin Tarantino, Harvey Keitel, Juliette Lewis, Cheech Marin, Fred Williamson, Salma Hayek, Ernest Liu, Danny Trejo, Tom Savini, Michael Parks, John Saxon, Marc Lawrence, Kelly Preston, John Hawkes, Tito & Tarantula	
J A N U A R Y	24	Caught	Sony Pictures Classics	Robert M. Young (director); Edward Pomerantz (screenplay); Edward James Olmos, Maria Conchita Alonso, Arie Verveen, Bitty Schram, Steven Schub	
J A N U A R Y	26	Angels & Insects	The Samuel Goldwyn Company	Philip Haas (director/screenplay); Belinda Haas (screenplay); Mark Rylance, Patsy Kensit, Kristin Scott Thomas, Jeremy Kemp, Douglas Henshall, Annette Badland, Chris Larkin, Anna Massey, Saskia Wickham, Lindsay Thomas, Michelle Sylvester, Clare Lovell, Jenny Lovell, Oona Haas, Angus Hodder, John Veasey	
J A N U A R Y	26	Bed of Roses	New Line Cinema	Michael Goldenberg (director/screenplay); Christian Slater, Mary Stuart Masterson, Pamela Adlon, Josh Brolin, Brian Tarantina, Debra Monk, Mary Alice, Kenneth Cranham, Ally Walker, Anne Pitoniak, Gina Torres, Nick Tate, Yvonne Zima, Desiree Casado, Aldis Hodge, S.A. Griffin, R.M. Haley, Cass Morgan, Victor Sierra, Michael Mantell, Zachary Chaltiel	
J A N U A R Y	26	Big Bully	Warner Bros. Pictures / Morgan Creek Productions	Steve Miner (director); Mark Steven Johnson (screenplay); Rick Moranis, Tom Arnold, Julianne Phillips, Carol Kane, Jeffrey Tambor, Curtis Armstrong, Don Knotts, Harry Waters Jr., Faith Prince, Blake Bashoff, Cody McMains, Stuart Pankin, Bill Dow, Norma MacMillan, Alf Humphreys, Miriam Smith, Gregory Smith, Tegan Moss, Alexander Pollock, Kyle Labine	
J A N U A R Y	26	Margaret's Museum	Cinepix Film Properties	Mort Ransen (director/screenplay); Gerald Weller (screenplay); Helena Bonham Carter, Clive Russell, Craig Olejnik, Kate Nelligan, Kenneth Welsh, Andrea Morris, Peter Boretski, Barrie Dunn, Norma Dell'Agnese	
J A N U A R Y	26	Once Upon a Time...When We Were Colored	BET Pictures / United Image Entertainment	Tim Reid (director); Paul W. Cooper (screenplay); Al Freeman Jr., Phylicia Rashad, Leon, Paula Kelly, Salli Richardson, Anna Maria Horsford, Bernie Casey, Isaac Hayes, Willie Norwood Jr., Karen Malina White, Damon Hines, Taj Mahal, Iona Morris, Phill Lewis, Polly Bergen, Richard Roundtree, Crystal R. Fox, Daphne Maxwell Reid	
J A N U A R Y	26	Screamers	Triumph Films	Christian Duguay (director); Dan O'Bannon, Miguel Tejada-Flores (screenplay); Peter Weller, Jennifer Rubin, Andrew Lauer, Ron White, Charles Powell, Roy Dupuis, Michael Caloz, Liliana Komorowska, Jason Cavalier, Leni Parker, Bruce Boa	
F E B R U A R Y	2	Antonia's Line	Asmik Ace Entertainment	Marleen Gorris (director/screenplay); Willeke van Ammelrooy, Els Dottermans, Jan Decleir, Victor Löw, Johan Heldenbergh, Dora van der Groen, Elsie de Brauw, Marina de Graaf, Mil Seghers, Veerle van Overloop, Thyrza Ravesteijn, Reinout Bussemaker, Jan Steen, Catherine ten Bruggencate, Esther Vriesendorp, Carolien Spoor, Paul Kooij	
F E B R U A R Y	2	Black Sheep	Paramount Pictures	Penelope Spheeris (director); Fred Wolf (screenplay); Chris Farley, David Spade, Tim Matheson, Christine Ebersole, Gary Busey, Grant Heslov, Timothy Carhart, Bruce McGill, Boyd Banks, David St. James, Skip O'Brien, Chris Owen, Mudhoney, Fred Wolf, Julie Benz, Kathleen O'Malley, John Ashker	
F E B R U A R Y	2	Dead Man Walking	Gramercy Pictures / PolyGram Filmed Entertainment	Tim Robbins (director/screenplay); Susan Sarandon, Sean Penn, Robert Prosky, Raymond J. Barry, R. Lee Ermey, Celia Weston, Lois Smith, Scott Wilson, Roberta Maxwell, Margo Martindale, Barton Heyman, Ray Aranha, Larry Pine, Gil Robbins, Clancy Brown, Peter Sarsgaard, Jack Black, Jon Abrahams, Eva Amurri, Miles Robbins, Nesbitt Blaisdell, Kevin Cooney, Michael Cullen, Missy Yager	
F E B R U A R Y	2	The Juror	Columbia Pictures	Brian Gibson (director); Irwin Winkler (screenplay); Demi Moore, Alec Baldwin, James Gandolfini, Joseph Gordon-Levitt, Lindsay Crouse, Anne Heche, Tony Lo Bianco, Michael Rispoli, Matthew Cowles, Matt Craven, Frank Adonis, Michael Constantine, Polly Adams, Jack Gilpin, Chuck Cooper, Frances Foster, Julie Halston, Todd Susman, Rosemary De Angelis, Joe Perrino, Randy Jurgensen, Chuck Zito, Anne Bobby, Charle Landry, Tom Signorelli, Robin Moseley, James Michael McCauley, William Hill	
F E B R U A R Y	2	White Squall	Hollywood Pictures / Scott Free Productions	Ridley Scott (director); Todd Robinson (screenplay); Jeff Bridges, John Savage, Caroline Goodall, Ryan Phillippe, Scott Wolf, Balthazar Getty, Jeremy Sisto, Jason Marsden, Eric Michael Cole, Julio Oscar Mechoso, David Lascher, Ethan Embry, David Selby, Jordan Clarke, Željko Ivanek, James Rebhorn, Jill Larson, Lizzy Mackay	
F E B R U A R Y	4	Gulliver's Travels	NBC / Jim Henson Productions / Hallmark Entertainment	Charles Sturridge (director); Simon Moore (screenplay); Ted Danson, Mary Steenburgen, James Fox, Omar Sharif, Peter O'Toole, Alfre Woodard, Kristin Scott Thomas, Sir John Gielgud, Isabelle Huppert, Tom Sturridge, Ned Beatty, Annette Badland, Kate Maberly, Shashi Kapoor, Geraldine Chaplin, Navin Chowdhry, Edward Fox, Warwick Davis, Edward Woodward, Nicholas Lyndhurst, Phoebe Nicholls, Robert Hardy, John Standing, John Wells, Graham Crowden, Richard Wilson, Edward Petherbridge, Karyn Parsons, George Harris	
F E B R U A R Y	9	Beautiful Girls	Miramax Films	Ted Demme (director); Scott Rosenberg (screenplay); Matt Dillon, Lauren Holly, Timothy Hutton, Rosie O'Donnell, Martha Plimpton, Natalie Portman, Michael Rapaport, Mira Sorvino, Uma Thurman, Noah Emmerich, Annabeth Gish, Max Perlich, Pruitt Taylor Vince, Anne Bobby, Richard Bright, David Arquette, Sam Robards, John Carroll Lynch, The Afghan Whigs	
F E B R U A R Y	9	Broken Arrow	20th Century Fox	John Woo (director); Graham Yost (screenplay); John Travolta, Christian Slater, Samantha Mathis, Delroy Lindo, Bob Gunton, Frank Whaley, Howie Long, Vondie Curtis-Hall, Jack Thompson, Vyto Ruginis, Shaun Toub, Casey Biggs, Gary Epper, J.N. Roberts, Kurtwood Smith, Daniel von Bargen, Carmen Argenziano, French Stewart, Chris Mulkey, Raymond Cruz	
F E B R U A R Y	9	A Midwinter's Tale	Rank Film Distributors / Castle Rock Entertainment	Kenneth Branagh (director/screenplay); Michael Maloney, Richard Briers, Hetta Chamley, Joan Collins, Nicholas Farrell, Mark Hadfield, Gerard Horan, Celia Imrie, Jennifer Saunders, Julia Sawalha, John Sessions, Ann Davies, James D. White, Robert Hines, Allie Byrne, Adrian Scarborough, Brian Pettifer, Patrick Doyle, Shaun Prendergast, Carol Starks, Edward Jewesbury, Katy Carmichael, Paul Randles	
F E B R U A R Y	9	Pie in the Sky	Fine Line Features	Bryan Gordon (director/screenplay); Josh Charles, Christine Lahti, John Goodman, Anne Heche, Dey Young, Christine Ebersole, Peter Riegert, Wil Wheaton, Bob Balaban, Larry Holden, David Rasche, William Newman, Alfred Dennis, Kathryn Grody, Jamie Marsh, Peggy Miley, Jane Downs, Brent Spiner	
F E B R U A R Y	16	City Hall	Columbia Pictures / Castle Rock Entertainment	Harold Becker (director); Kenneth Lipper, Paul Schrader, Nicholas Pileggi, Bo Goldman (screenplay); Al Pacino, John Cusack, Bridget Fonda, Danny Aiello, David Paymer, Martin Landau, Anthony Franciosa, Richard Schiff, Lindsay Duncan, Nestor Serrano, Mel Winkler, Lauren Vélez, Larry Romano, Ray Aranha, Murphy Guyer, John Finn, Richard Gant, Tamara Tunie, Fran Brill, Brian Murray, John Slattery, Sylvia Kauders, Stanley Anderson, Harry Bugin, Fritz Hollings, Kaity Tong, Amy Atkins, Mary Murphy, Roma Torre, Jack Cafferty, Ed Koch, Doris McCarthy	
F E B R U A R Y	16	Happy Gilmore	Universal Pictures	Dennis Dugan (director); Tim Herlihy, Adam Sandler (screenplay); Adam Sandler, Christopher McDonald, Julie Bowen, Frances Bay, Carl Weathers, Allen Covert, Kevin Nealon, Peter Kelamis, Richard Kiel, Dennis Dugan, Joe Flaherty, Jared Van Snellenberg, Will Sasso, Lee Trevino, Bob Barker, Verne Lundquist, Mark Lye, Ben Stiller	
F E B R U A R Y	16	Mr. Wrong	Touchstone Pictures	Nick Castle (director); Chris Matheson, Kerry Ehrin, Craig Munson (screenplay); Ellen DeGeneres, Bill Pullman, Joan Cusack, Dean Stockwell, Joan Plowright, Hope Davis, Ellen Cleghorne, Robert Goulet, John Livingston, Peter White, Polly Holliday, Camille Saviola, Brad William Henke, Maddie Corman, Louie Anderson, Casey Kasem, Jean Kasem, Briant Wells, Christine Cattell, Jonathan Hernandez, Victoria Flores	
F E B R U A R Y	16	Muppet Treasure Island	Walt Disney Pictures / Jim Henson Productions	Brian Henson (director); Jerry Juhl, James V. Hart, Kirk R. Thatcher (screenplay); Tim Curry, Kevin Bishop, Jennifer Saunders, Billy Connolly, Dave Goelz, Steve Whitmire, Jerry Nelson, Kevin Clash, Frank Oz, Bill Barretta, John Henson, Louise Gold, Don Austen	
F E B R U A R Y	17	America's Dream	HBO Pictures / Carrie Productions	Paris Barclay, Bill Duke, Kevin Rodney Sullivan (directors); Ron Stacker Thompson, Ashley Tyler (screenplay); Wesley Snipes, Danny Glover, Lorraine Toussaint, Tate Donovan, Norman D. Golden II, Susanna Thompson, Jasmine Guy, Tina Lifford, Carl Lumbly, Bennet Guillory, Danny Kamin, RaéVen Kelly, Timothy Carhart, Summer Ross Jefferson, Vanessa Bell Calloway, Winter Elaine Jefferson, Amanda Addison, Kevin Jamal Woods, Ruth Beckford, Yolanda King	
F E B R U A R Y	21	Bottle Rocket	Columbia Pictures	Wes Anderson (director/screenplay); Owen Wilson (screenplay); Luke Wilson, Owen Wilson, Robert Musgrave, James Caan, Lumi Cavazos, Ned Dowd, Shea Fowler, Haley Miller, Andrew Wilson, Brian Tenenbaum, Stephen Dignan, Anna Cifuentes, Kumar Pallana	
F E B R U A R Y	23	Before and After	Hollywood Pictures / Caravan Pictures	Barbet Schroeder (director); Ted Tally (screenplay); Meryl Streep, Liam Neeson, Edward Furlong, Julia Weldon, Alfred Molina, Daniel von Bargen, John Heard, Ann Magnuson, Alison Folland, Larry Pine, Kaiulani Lee	
F E B R U A R Y	23	Mary Reilly	TriStar Pictures	Stephen Frears (director); Christopher Hampton (screenplay); Julia Roberts, John Malkovich, Michael Sheen, George Cole, Michael Gambon, Glenn Close, Kathy Staff, Bronagh Gallagher, Linda Bassett, Henry Goodman, Ciaran Hinds, Tim Barlow, Stephen Boxer, Bob Mason, Isabella Marsh, Richard Leaf, Wendy Nottingham, Ellie Crockett, Robbi Stevens, Kadamba Simmons, Evelyn Doggart, Pui Fan Lee, Mimi Potworowska, Samantha Hones, Julia Hagen	
F E B R U A R Y	23	Unforgettable	Metro-Goldwyn-Mayer	John Dahl (director); Bill Geddie (screenplay); Ray Liotta, Linda Fiorentino, Peter Coyote, Christopher McDonald, Kim Cattrall, Kim Coates, David Paymer, William B. Davis	
F E B R U A R Y	23	The Young Poisoner's Handbook	C/FP Distribution	Benjamin Ross (director/screenplay); Jeff Rawle (screenplay); Hugh O'Conor, Tobias Arnold, Ruth Sheen, Roger Lloyd-Pack, Norman Caro, Charlotte Coleman, Jack Deam, Vilma Hollingbery, Frank Mills, Rupert Farley, Malcolm Sinclair, Charlie Creed-Miles, Antony Sher, Cate Fowler, Hazel Douglas, Arthur Cox, John Thomson, Simon Kunz, Tim Potter, Dorothea Alexander, Paul Stacey, Samantha Edmonds, Robert Dem, Peter Pacey, Joost Siedhoff, Dirk Robertson, John Abbott, Jean Warren, Frank Coda, Anna Kollenda, Katja Kollenda	
F E B R U A R Y	24	The Late Shift	HBO Pictures / Northern Lights Entertainment	Betty Thomas (director); George Armitage, Bill Carter (screenplay); John Michael Higgins, Daniel Roebuck, Kathy Bates, Bob Balaban, Ed Begley Jr., Peter Jurasik, Reni Santoni, John Kapelos, Steven Gilborn, John Getz, Lawrence Pressman, Sandra Bernhard, Treat Williams, David Brisbin, Michael Chieffo, Paul Elder, Michael Fairman, Nicholas Guest, Lucinda Jenney, Ken Kragen, Aaron Lustig, Kevin Scannell, Edmund L. Shaff, Kerry Noonan, Rich Little, Little Richard, Penny Peyser, Arthur Taxier	
M A R C H	1	Down Periscope	20th Century Fox	David S. Ward (director); Hugh Wilson, Andrew Kurtzman, Eliot Wald (screenplay); Kelsey Grammer, Lauren Holly, Rob Schneider, Harry Dean Stanton, Bruce Dern, Rip Torn, William H. Macy, Ken Hudson Campbell, Toby Huss, Duane Martin, Jonathan Penner, Bradford Tatum, Harland Williams, Patton Oswalt	
M A R C H	1	Up Close & Personal	Touchstone Pictures / Cinergi Pictures	Jon Avnet (director); John Gregory Dunne, Joan Didion (screenplay); Robert Redford, Michelle Pfeiffer, Stockard Channing, Joe Mantegna, Kate Nelligan, Glenn Plummer, James Rebhorn, Scott Bryce, Raymond Cruz, Dedee Pfeiffer, Miguel Sandoval, Noble Willingham, James Karen, Brian Markinson	
M A R C H	8	The Birdcage	United Artists	Mike Nichols (director); Elaine May (screenplay); Robin Williams, Gene Hackman, Nathan Lane, Dianne Wiest, Hank Azaria, Calista Flockhart, Dan Futterman, Christine Baranski, Tom McGowan, Grant Heslov, Tim Kelleher, Ann Cusack, Stanley DeSantis, J. Roy Helland, Anthony Giaimo, Lee Delano, David Sage, Michael Kinsley, Trina McGee-Davis, Herschel Sparber, Francesca Cruz, Al Rodrigo, Luis Camacho, Dante Henderson, Kevin Alexander Stea, Jay Leno, Don LaFontaine	
M A R C H	8	Fargo	Gramercy Pictures	The Coen Brothers (director/screenplay); Frances McDormand, William H. Macy, Steve Buscemi, Harve Presnell, Peter Stormare, Kristin Rudrud, Tony Denman, Steve Reevis, Larry Brandenburg, John Carroll Lynch, Steve Park, Larissa Kokernot, Melissa Peterman, Bain Boehlke, Warren Keith, Jose Feliciano, Gary Houston, Bruce Campbell, Sally Wingert	
M A R C H	8	Hellraiser: Bloodline	Miramax Films	Alan Smithee (director); Peter Atkins (screenplay); Doug Bradley, Bruce Ramsay, Valentina Vargas, Kim Myers, Adam Scott, Christine Harnos, Charlotte Chatton, Mickey Cottrell, Jody St. Michael, Courtland Mead	
M A R C H	8	Homeward Bound II: Lost in San Francisco	Walt Disney Pictures	David R. Ellis (director); Chris Hauty, Julie Hickson (screenplay); Ralph Waite, Michael J. Fox, Sally Field, Robert Hays, Kim Greist, Veronica Lauren, Kevin Chevalia, Benj Thall, Max Perlich, Michael Rispoli, Sinbad, Carla Gugino, Tisha Campbell, Jon Polito, Adam Goldberg, Stephen Tobolowsky, Ross Malinger, Michael Bell, Tress MacNeille, Al Michaels, Tommy Lasorda, Bob Uecker, Jeff Fischer, Andrew Airlie, Will Sasso, Bart the Bear	
M A R C H	8	If Lucy Fell	TriStar Pictures / Motion Picture Corporation of America	Eric Schaeffer (director/screenplay); Sarah Jessica Parker, Eric Schaeffer, Ben Stiller, Elle Macpherson, James Rebhorn, Robert John Burke, David Thornton, Bill Sage, Dominic Chianese, Scarlett Johansson	
M A R C H	8	The Star Maker	Miramax Films	Giuseppe Tornatore (director/screenplay); Fabio Rinaudo (screenplay); Sergio Castellitto, Tiziana Lodato, Leopoldo Trieste, Leo Gullotta, Jane Alexander, Tony Sperandeo, Tano Cimarosa, Franco Scaldati, Salvatore Billa, Clelia Rondinella	
M A R C H	15	The Celluloid Closet	Sony Pictures Classics	Rob Epstein, Jeffrey Friedman (directors/screenplay); Vito Russo, Sharon Wood, Armistead Maupin (screenplay); Lily Tomlin, Jay Presson Allen, Susie Bright, Quentin Crisp, Tony Curtis, Richard Dyer, Arthur Laurents, Armistead Maupin, Whoopi Goldberg, Jan Oxenberg, Harvey Fierstein, Gore Vidal, Farley Granger, Paul Rudnick, Shirley MacLaine, Barry Sandler, Mart Crowley, Antonio Fargas, Tom Hanks, Ron Nyswaner, Daniel Melnick, Harry Hamlin, John Schlesinger, Susan Sarandon, Stewart Stern	
M A R C H	15	Ed	Universal Pictures	Bill Couturié (director); David M. Evans (screenplay); Matt LeBlanc, Jayne Brook, Bill Cobbs, Jack Warden, Doren Fein, Jim Caviezel, Jim O'Heir, Steve Eastin, Brad Hunt, Jay Caputo, Denise Cheshire	
M A R C H	15	Executive Decision	Warner Bros. Pictures / Silver Pictures	Stuart Baird (director); Jim Thomas, John Thomas (screenplay); Kurt Russell, Steven Seagal, Halle Berry, John Leguizamo, Oliver Platt, Joe Morton, David Suchet, BD Wong, Len Cariou, Whip Hubley, Andreas Katsulas, Mary Ellen Trainor, Marla Maples, J. T. Walsh, Nicholas Pryor, Robert Apisa, William James Jones, Charles Hallahan, Richard Riehle, Ken Jenkins, Jay Tavare, Christopher Maher, Ray Baker, Michael Milhoan	
M A R C H	15	Two Much	Touchstone Pictures / Interscope Communications	Fernando Trueba (director/screenplay); David Trueba (screenplay); Antonio Banderas, Melanie Griffith, Daryl Hannah, Danny Aiello, Joan Cusack, Eli Wallach, Gabino Diego, Austin Pendleton, Allan Rich, Vincent Schiavelli, Phil Leeds, Sid Raymond	
M A R C H	22	Diabolique	Warner Bros. Pictures / Morgan Creek Productions	Jeremiah S. Chechik (director); Henri-Georges Clouzot, Don Roos (screenplay); Sharon Stone, Isabelle Adjani, Chazz Palminteri, Kathy Bates, Spalding Gray, Shirley Knight, Allen Garfield, Adam Hann-Byrd, Donal Logue, Diana Bellamy, Clea Lewis, Jeffrey Abrams, O'Neal Compton	
M A R C H	22	Flirting with Disaster	Miramax Films	David O. Russell (director/screenplay); Ben Stiller, Patricia Arquette, Téa Leoni, Mary Tyler Moore, George Segal, Alan Alda, Lily Tomlin, Richard Jenkins, Josh Brolin, Celia Weston, Glenn Fitzgerald, Beth Ostrosky, David Patrick Kelly, Nadia Dajani	
M A R C H	22	Girl 6	Fox Searchlight Pictures / 40 Acres and a Mule Filmworks	Spike Lee (director); Suzan-Lori Parks (screenplay); Theresa Randle, Isaiah Washington, Spike Lee, Jenifer Lewis, Debi Mazar, Peter Berg, Michael Imperioli, Kristen Wilson, Debra Wilson, Naomi Campbell, Gretchen Mol, Richard Belzer, Larry Pine, Coati Mundi, Delilah Cotto, Tom Byrd III, Madonna, Arthur J. Nascarella, John Turturro, Quentin Tarantino, Ron Silver, Leonard L. Thomas, Joie Susannah Lee, Rolonda Watts, Halle Berry, Novella Nelson, Susan Batson, Ranjit Chowdhry, Rita Wolf, Andrea Navedo, John Cameron Mitchell, Jeff Ward, Chuck Jeffreys, Mekhi Phifer	
M A R C H	22	It's My Party	United Artists	Randal Kleiser (director/screenplay); Eric Roberts, Margaret Cho, Lee Grant, Gregory Harrison, Olivia Newton-John, Marlee Matlin, Bronson Pinchot, George Segal, Bruce Davison, Devon Gummersall, Roddy McDowall, Steve Antin, Sally Kellerman, Lou Liberatore, Nina Foch, Christopher Atkins, Dennis Christopher, Ron Glass, Paul Regina, Cassandra Peterson, Joey Cramer	
M A R C H	22	Jack and Sarah	Gramercy Pictures	Tim Sullivan (director/screenplay); Richard E. Grant, Samantha Mathis, Judi Dench, Ian McKellen, Eileen Atkins, Cherie Lunghi, Imogen Stubbs, Bianca Lee & Sophia Lee, Sophia Sullivan	
M A R C H	22	Land and Freedom	Gramercy Pictures / PolyGram Filmed Entertainment	Ken Loach (director); Jim Allen (screenplay); Ian Hart, Rosana Pastor, Frédéric Pierrot, Tom Gilroy, Icíar Bollaín, Paul Laverty, Suzanne Maddock, Marc Martínez	
M A R C H	22	Little Indian, Big City	Touchstone Pictures	Hervé Palud (director/screenplay); Philippe Bruneau, Thierry Lhermitte (screenplay); Thierry Lhermitte, Patrick Timsit, Ludwig Briand, Miou-Miou, Arielle Dombasle, Jackie Berroyer, Marc de Jonge, Sonia Vollereaux, Louba Guertchikoff, Philippe Bruneau, Marie-Charlotte Leclaire, Vladimir Kotlyarov, Olga Jiroušková, Pauline Pinsolle, Stanley Zana, Gaston Dolle	
M A R C H	22	Race the Sun	TriStar Pictures	Charles T. Kanganis (director); Barry Morrow (screenplay); Halle Berry, James Belushi, Casey Affleck, Eliza Dushku, Kevin Tighe, Bill Hunter, Anthony Ruivivar, Dion Basco, Sara Tanaka, Steve Zahn, Robert Hughes, Jeff Truman, Joel Edgerton, J. Moki Cho, Nadja Pionilla, Adriane Napualani Uganiza	
M A R C H	23	Rasputin: Dark Servant of Destiny	HBO Pictures / Rysher Entertainment / Citadel Entertainment	Uli Edel (director); Peter Pruce (screenplay); Alan Rickman, Greta Scacchi, Ian McKellen, David Warner, John Wood, James Frain, Ian Hogg, Sheila Ruskin, Peter Jeffrey, Freddie Findlay, Julian Curry, István Bicskei, John Cater, István Hunyadkürti, Zsofia Ivony, Gábor Koncz, Patricia Kovács, Robert Lang, Elena A. Malashevskaya, Fanni Petö, Diana Quick, Natasha Reshetnikova, László Sinkó, John Turner	
M A R C H	29	All Dogs Go to Heaven 2	Metro-Goldwyn-Mayer	Paul Sabella (director); Arne Olsen, Kelly Ward, Mark Young (screenplays); Charlie Sheen, Sheena Easton, Ernest Borgnine, Dom DeLuise, George Hearn, Bebe Neuwirth, Adam Wylie, Jesse Corti, Wallace Shawn, Hamilton Camp, Dan Castellaneta, Pat Corley, Jim Cummings, Bobby Di Cicco, Tony Jay, Maurice LaMarche, Steve Mackall, Kevin Michael Richardson, Annette Helde, Marabina James	
M A R C H	29	Carried Away	Fine Line Features	Bruno Barreto (director); Ed Jones (screenplay); Dennis Hopper, Amy Irving, Amy Locane, Julie Harris, Gary Busey, Hal Holbrook, Christopher Pettiet, Priscilla Pointer, Gail Cronauer, Todd Duffey, Joe Stevens, Connie Cooper, Eleese Lester, Doug Jackson	
M A R C H	29	Denise Calls Up	Sony Pictures Classics / Davis Entertainment / Rastar Productions	Hal Salwen (director/screenplay); Tim Daly, Caroleen Feeney, Dan Gunther, Dana Wheeler-Nicholson, Liev Schreiber, Aida Turturro, Alanna Ubach, Jean-Claude La Marre, Mark Blum, Sylvia Miles, Hal Salwen	
M A R C H	29	A Family Thing	United Artists	Richard Pearce (director); Billy Bob Thornton, Tom Epperson (screenplay); Robert Duvall, James Earl Jones, Irma P. Hall, Michael Beach, David Keith, Regina Taylor, Grace Zabriskie, Paula Marshall	
M A R C H	29	Sgt. Bilko	Universal Pictures / Imagine Entertainment	Jonathan Lynn (director); Andy Breckman (screenplay); Steve Martin, Dan Aykroyd, Phil Hartman, Glenne Headly, John Marshall Jones, Pamela Adlon, Austin Pendleton, Chris Rock, Cathy Silvers, Steve Park, Debra Jo Rupp, Richard Herd, Dan Ferro, John Ortiz, Max Casella, Daryl Mitchell, Mitchell Whitfield, Dale Dye, Rance Howard, Travis Tritt, Reno Wilson, Clifton Gonzalez Gonzalez, Cheryl Francis Harrington, Brian Leckner, Eric Edwards, Steve Kehela, Charles C. Stevenson	

== April–June ==
Opening		Title	Production company	Cast and crew	Ref.
A P R I L	3	A Thin Line Between Love and Hate	New Line Cinema / Savoy Pictures / Jackson-McHenry Entertainment	Martin Lawrence (director/screenplay); Bentley Kyle Evans, Kenny Buford, Kim Bass (screenplay); Martin Lawrence, Lynn Whitfield, Regina King, Bobby Brown, Della Reese, Malinda Williams, Daryl Mitchell, Roger E. Mosley, Simbi Khali, Tangie Ambrose, Wendy Raquel Robinson, Miguel A. Nunez Jr., Faizon Love, Michael Bell, Michael Taliferro, Tommy 'Tiny' Lister Jr., Tracy Morgan	
A P R I L	5	Primal Fear	Paramount Pictures / Rysher Entertainment	Gregory Hoblit (director); Steve Shagan, Ann Biderman (screenplay); Richard Gere, Laura Linney, John Mahoney, Alfre Woodard, Frances McDormand, Edward Norton, Reg Rogers, Terry O'Quinn, Andre Braugher, Steven Bauer, Joe Spano, Tony Plana, Stanley Anderson, Maura Tierney, Jon Seda, Kenneth Tigar	
A P R I L	7	Sabrina the Teenage Witch	Showtime Networks / Viacom Productions / Hartbreak Films	Tibor Takács (director); Barney Cohen, Nicholas Factor, Kathryn Wallack (story and teleplay); Melissa Joan Hart, Sherry Miller, Charlene Fernetz, Michelle Beaudoin, Ryan Reynolds, Tobias Mehler, Laura Harris, Tyler Labine, Lalainia Lindbjerg, Kea Wong, Biski Gugushe, Jim Swansburg, Noel Geer, Jo Bates, Janine Cox	
A P R I L	9	Tremors 2: Aftershocks	MCA/Universal Home Video / Stampede Entertainment	S. S. Wilson (director/screenplay); Brent Maddock (screenplay); Fred Ward, Christopher Gartin, Helen Shaver, Michael Gross, Marcelo Tubert, Thomas Rosales Jr., S. S. Wilson, Marco Hernandez, José Rosario	
A P R I L	12	Fear	Universal Pictures / Imagine Entertainment	James Foley (director); Christopher Crowe (screenplay); Mark Wahlberg, Reese Witherspoon, William Petersen, Alyssa Milano, Amy Brenneman, Gary Riley, Jed Rees, Todd Caldecott, Andrew Airlie, Christopher Gray, Tracy Fraim, Jason Kristofer, Gerry Bean, David Fredericks, Banner (dog)	
A P R I L	12	Getting Away with Murder	Savoy Pictures	Harvey Miller (director/screenplay); Dan Aykroyd, Lily Tomlin, Jack Lemmon, Bonnie Hunt, Brian Kerwin, Jerry Adler, Andy Romano, Robert Fields, J. C. Quinn, Susan Forristal, Marissa Chibas, Jon Korkes, Rino Romano, Damon D'Oliveira, Wayne Robson, Kevin Frank	
A P R I L	12	James and the Giant Peach	Walt Disney Pictures / Allied Filmmakers	Henry Selick (director); Steven Bloom, Karey Kirkpatrick, Jonathan Roberts (screenplay); Paul Terry, Simon Callow, Richard Dreyfuss, Susan Sarandon, Jane Leeves, Miriam Margolyes, David Thewlis, Joanna Lumley, Pete Postlethwaite, Steven Culp, Susan Turner-Cray, Mike Starr, Jeff Bennett	
A P R I L	12	Jane Eyre	Miramax Films	Franco Zeffirelli (director/screenplay); Hugh Whitemore (screenplay); William Hurt, Charlotte Gainsbourg, Joan Plowright, Anna Paquin, Geraldine Chaplin, Billie Whitelaw, Maria Schneider, Fiona Shaw, John Wood, Amanda Root, Leanne Rowe, Richard Warwick, Judith Parker, Josephine Serre, Elle Macpherson, Julian Fellowes, Edward de Souza, Peter Woodthorpe, Ralph Nossek, Samuel West, Charlotte Attenborough	
A P R I L	12	Kids in the Hall: Brain Candy	Paramount Pictures / Lakeshore Entertainment	Kelly Makin (director); Norm Hiscock, Bruce McCulloch, Kevin McDonald, Mark McKinney, Scott Thompson (screenplay); Dave Foley, Bruce McCulloch, Kevin McDonald, Mark McKinney, Scott Thompson, Kathryn Greenwood, Amy Smith, Lachlan Murdoch, Nicole de Boer, Krista Bridges, Christopher Redman	
A P R I L	19	Celtic Pride	Hollywood Pictures / Caravan Pictures	Tom DeCerchio (director); Judd Apatow (screenplay); Damon Wayans, Daniel Stern, Dan Aykroyd, Gail O'Grady, Christopher McDonald, Paul Guilfoyle, Adam Hendershott, Scott Lawrence, Darrell Hammond, Deion Sanders, Bill Walton, Larry Bird, Marv Albert	
A P R I L	19	Faithful	New Line Cinema	Paul Mazursky (director); Chazz Palminteri (screenplay); Cher, Chazz Palminteri, Ryan O'Neal, Paul Mazursky, Amber Smith, Elisa Leonetti, Mark Nassar, Stephen Spinella, Jeffrey Wright, David Marino, Steven Randazzo, Olinda Turturro, Max Norat	
A P R I L	19	Mrs. Winterbourne	TriStar Pictures	Richard Benjamin (director); Phoef Sutton, Lisa-Maria Radano (screenplay); Shirley MacLaine, Ricki Lake, Brendan Fraser, Miguel Sandoval, Loren Dean. Peter Gerety, Jane Krakowski, Debra Monk, Kate Hennig, Susan Haskell, Jennifer Irwin, Colin Fox, Bobcat Goldthwait, Paula Prentiss, Tony Robbins, Cathryn de Prume, Justin Vanlieshout, Alec Thomilson	
A P R I L	19	My Favorite Season	AMLF	André Téchiné (director/screenplay); Pascal Bonitzer (screenplay); Catherine Deneuve, Daniel Auteuil, Marthe Villalonga, Jean-Pierre Bouvier, Chiara Mastroianni, Carmen Chaplin, Anthony Prada, Michèle Moretti, Jacques Nolot, Bruno Todeschini, Jean Bousquet, Roschdy Zem, Ingrid Caven	
A P R I L	19	Mystery Science Theater 3000: The Movie	Gramercy Pictures / Universal Pictures	Jim Mallon (director/screenplay); Trace Beaulieu, Paul Chaplin, Bridget Jones, Kevin Murphy, Michael J. Nelson, Mary Jo Pehl (screenplay); Michael J. Nelson, Trace Beaulieu, Kevin Murphy, Jim Mallon, John Brady	
A P R I L	19	The Substitute	LIVE Entertainment	Robert Mandel (director); Roy Frumkes, Rocco Simonelli (screenplay); Tom Berenger, Ernie Hudson, Diane Venora, Glenn Plummer, Cliff DeYoung, Marc Anthony, Richard Brooks, Raymond Cruz, Rodney A. Grant, Luis Guzmán, Peggy Pope, Vincent Laresca, William Forsythe, Sharron Corley, Willis Sparks, Maria Celedonio, David Spates	
A P R I L	20	Soul of the Game	HBO Pictures	Kevin Rodney Sullivan (director); Gary Hoffman (screenplay); Delroy Lindo, Mykelti Williamson, Blair Underwood, Edward Herrmann, R. Lee Ermey, Salli Richardson, Gina Ravera, Obba Babatundé, Cylk Cozart, J. D. Hall, Jerry Hardin, Brent Jennings, Richard Riehle, Armand Asselin, Joey Banks, Guy Boyd, Stacye P. Branche, Gregg Burge, Ed Cambridge, Mimi Cozzens, Erika Flores, Holiday Freeman, Jesse D. Goins, Tracy Holliway, David Johnson, Joseph Latimore, Bob Minor, Edwin Morrow, Jon Pennell, Lou Richards, Al Rossi, Darnell Suttles, Isaiah Washington, Harvey Williams, Oscar Williams, Sean Blakemore, Jeff Coopwood, Dwight D. Eisenhower, Kenesaw M. Landis, Jimmy Ortega, Leroy "Satchel" Paige, Jackie Robinson	
A P R I L	26	Butterfly Kiss	Cinépix Film Properties	Michael Winterbottom (director/screenplay); Frank Cottrell Boyce (screenplay); Amanda Plummer, Saskia Reeves, Kathy Jamieson, Des McAleer, Lisa Riley, Freda Dowie, Paula Tilbrook, Fine Time Fontayne, Joanne Cook, Paul Bown, Emily Aston, Ricky Tomlinson, Katy Murphy	
A P R I L	26	Cemetery Man	October Films	Michele Soavi (director); Gianni Romoli (screenplay); Rupert Everett, François Hadji-Lazaro, Anna Falchi, Mickey Knox, Anton Alexander, Barbara Cupisti, Derek Jacobi, Fabiana Formica, Clive Riche, Stefano Masciarelli, Alessandro Zamattio, Katja Anton, Patrizia Punzo, Renato Doris	
A P R I L	26	Mulholland Falls	Metro-Goldwyn-Mayer / Largo Entertainment / The Zanuck Company	Lee Tamahori (director); Pete Dexter (screenplay); Nick Nolte, Melanie Griffith, Chazz Palminteri, Michael Madsen, Chris Penn, Jennifer Connelly, Treat Williams, Andrew McCarthy, John Malkovich, Bruce Dern, Daniel Baldwin, Kyle Chandler, William L. Petersen, Ed Lauter, Larry Garrison, Melinda Clarke, Ernie Lively, Titus Welliver, Aaron Neville, Buddy Joe Hooker, Rob Lowe, Louise Fletcher	
A P R I L	26	The Quest	Universal Pictures	Jean-Claude Van Damme (director); Steven Klein, Paul Mones (screenplay); Jean-Claude Van Damme, Roger Moore, James Remar, Janet Gunn, Jack McGee, Aki Aleong, Abdel Qissi, Jen Sung, Louis Mandylor, Chang Ching Peng Chaplin, Ryan Cutrona, Koji Kitao, Shane Meier	
A P R I L	26	Sunset Park	TriStar Pictures / Jersey Films	Steve Gomer (director); Seth Zvi Rosenfeld, Kathleen McGhee-Anderson (screenplay); Rhea Perlman, Fredro Starr, Antwon Tanner, Terrence Howard, Carol Kane, Camille Saviola, De'aundre Bonds, Talent Harris, Guy Torry, John Vargas	
A P R I L	26	The Truth About Cats & Dogs	20th Century Fox	Michael Lehmann (director); Audrey Wells (screenplay); Janeane Garofalo, Uma Thurman, Ben Chaplin, Jamie Foxx, James McCaffrey, Richard Coca, Stanley DeSantis, David Cross, Mary Lynn Rajskub, Bob Odenkirk	
M A Y	1	I Shot Andy Warhol	The Samuel Goldwyn Company	Mary Harron (director/screenplay); Daniel Minahan (screenplay); Lili Taylor, Jared Harris, Martha Plimpton, Stephen Dorff, Lothaire Bluteau, Anna Levine, Peter Friedman, Tahnee Welch, Jamie Harrold, Donovan Leitch, Jim Lyons, Michael Imperioli, Reg Rogers, Bill Sage, Justin Theroux, Jill Hennessy, Coco McPherson, Lorraine Farris, Craig Chester, Victor Browne, Billy Erb, Anh Duong, Myriam Cyr	
M A Y	3	Barb Wire	Gramercy Pictures / Propaganda Films	David Hogan (director); Chuck Pfarrer, Ilene Chaiken (screenplay); Pamela Anderson, Temuera Morrison, Victoria Rowell, Jack Noseworthy, Xander Berkeley, Udo Kier, Steve Railsback, Andre Rosey Brown, Nicholas Worth, Clint Howard, Henry Kingi, Dominiquie Vandenberg, Tony Bill, Marshall Manesh, John Paxton, Neil Hunt, Tommy "Tiny" Lister Jr., Candace Kita, Nils Allen Stewart, Mark Collver, Jennifer Banko, Loren Rubin, Peewee Piemonte, Michael Russo, Shelly Desai, Ken Fosgren, Teo, Ai Wan, Diane Warshay	
M A Y	3	Captives	Miramax Films	Angela Pope (director); Frank Deasy (screenplay); Julia Ormond, Tim Roth, Keith Allen, Mark Strong, Siobhan Redmond, Peter Capaldi, Colin Salmon, Richard Hawley, Annette Badland, Jeff Nuttall, Kenneth Cope	
M A Y	3	The Craft	Columbia Pictures	Andrew Fleming (director/screenplay); Peter Filardi (screenplay); Robin Tunney, Fairuza Balk, Neve Campbell, Rachel True, Skeet Ulrich, Christine Taylor, Assumpta Serna, Breckin Meyer, Nathaniel Marston, Cliff De Young, Helen Shaver, Jeanine Jackson, William Newman, Brenda Strong, Tony Genaro, Jason Filardi, Esther Scott, John Kapelos, Kathleen Lloyd	
M A Y	3	The Great White Hype	20th Century Fox	Reginald Hudlin (director); Tony Hendra, Ron Shelton (screenplay); Samuel L. Jackson, Jeff Goldblum, Damon Wayans, Corbin Bernsen, Peter Berg, Jon Lovitz, Salli Richardson, Jamie Foxx, Cheech Marin, John Rhys-Davies, Rocky Carroll, Michael Jace, Bert Sugar, Art Evans, Nedra Volz, Method Man, Brian Setzer, Deezer D, Reno Wilson, Chi McBride, Kevin Grevioux	
M A Y	3	Last Dance	Touchstone Pictures	Bruce Beresford (director); Steven Haft, Ron Koslow (screenplay); Sharon Stone, Rob Morrow, Randy Quaid, Peter Gallagher, Jack Thompson, Jayne Brook, Pamala Tyson, Skeet Ulrich, Don Harvey, Patricia French, Ralph Wilcox, Meg Tilly, Diane Sellers, Buck Ford, Dave Hager, Christine Cattell, Peg Allen	
M A Y	3	The Pallbearer	Miramax Films	Matt Reeves (director/screenplay); Jason Katims (screenplay); David Schwimmer, Gwyneth Paltrow, Toni Collette, Michael Vartan, Michael Rapaport, Barbara Hershey, Carol Kane, Bitty Schram, Jean De Baer, Mark Margolis, Elizabeth Franz	
M A Y	10	Boys	Touchstone Pictures / Interscope Communications	Stacy Cochran (director/screenplay); Winona Ryder, Lukas Haas, John C. Reilly, James LeGros, Skeet Ulrich, Matt Malloy, Spencer Vrooman, Charlie Hofheimer, Bill Sage, Wiley Wiggins, Vivienne Shub, Russell Young, Christopher Pettiet, Catherine Keener, Maddie Corman, Andy Davis, Jessica Harper, Chris Cooper	
M A Y	10	Cold Comfort Farm	Universal Pictures / Gramercy Pictures	John Schlesinger (director); Malcolm Bradbury (screenplay); Eileen Atkins, Kate Beckinsale, Sheila Burrell, Stephen Fry, Freddie Jones, Joanna Lumley, Ian McKellen, Miriam Margolyes, Rufus Sewell, Ivan Kaye, Jeremy Peters, Maria Miles, Christopher Bowen, Louise Rea, Sophie Revell, Rupert Penry-Jones, Angela Thorne, Harry Ditson	
M A Y	10	Dead Man	Miramax Films	Jim Jarmusch (director/screenplay); Johnny Depp, Gary Farmer, Lance Henriksen, Michael Wincott, Eugene Byrd, Crispin Glover, Iggy Pop, Billy Bob Thornton, Jared Harris, Mili Avital, Gabriel Byrne, John Hurt, Alfred Molina, Robert Mitchum, Gibby Haynes, Michelle Thrush	
M A Y	10	Of Love and Shadows	Miramax Films	Betty Kaplan (director); Donald Freed (screenplay); Antonio Banderas, Jennifer Connelly, Stefania Sandrelli, Camilo Gallardo, Diego Wallraff, Patricio Contreras, Jorge Rivera Lopez, Jacques Arndt	
M A Y	10	Original Gangstas	Orion Pictures	Larry Cohen (director); Aubrey K. Rattan (screenplay); Fred Williamson, Jim Brown, Pam Grier, Paul Winfield, Isabel Sanford, Oscar Brown Jr., Ron O'Neal, Richard Roundtree, Christopher Duncan, Eddie Bo Smith Jr., Dru Down, Kevin Watson, Shyheim Franklin, Robert Forster, Charles Napier, Wings Hauser, Frank Pesce, Godfrey Danchimah, Seraiah Carol, Dawn Stern, Timothy Lewis, Linda Marie Bright	
M A Y	10	Twister	Warner Bros. Pictures / Universal Pictures / Amblin Entertainment	Jan de Bont (director); Michael Crichton, Anne-Marie Martin (screenplay); Helen Hunt, Bill Paxton, Jami Gertz, Cary Elwes, Philip Seymour Hoffman, Alan Ruck, Sean Whalen, Jeremy Davies, Joey Slotnick, Todd Field, Scott Thomson, Wendle Josepher, Lois Smith, Zach Grenier, Richard Lineback, Rusty Schwimmer, Alexa Vega, Jake Busey, Abraham Benrubi, Gary England, Jeff Lazalier, Rick Mitchell	
M A Y	17	Flipper	Universal Pictures / The Bubble Factory	Alan Shapiro (director); Ricou Browning, Jack Cowden (screenplay); Paul Hogan, Elijah Wood, Chelsea Field, Issac Hayes, Jonathan Banks, Jessica Wesson, Bill Kelley, Jason Fuchs, Robert Deacon, Ann Carey, Mark Casella, Luke Halpin	
M A Y	17	Heaven's Prisoners	New Line Cinema / Savoy Pictures	Phil Joanou (director); Harley Peyton, Scott Frank (screenplay); Alec Baldwin, Kelly Lynch, Mary Stuart Masterson, Teri Hatcher, Eric Roberts, Vondie Curtis-Hall, Joe Viterelli, Badja Djola, Hawthorne James, Paul Guilfoyle, Don Stark, Carl A. McGee, Tuck Milligan, Samantha Lagpacan	
M A Y	18	Norma Jean & Marilyn	HBO Pictures	Tim Fywell (director); Jill Isaacs (screenplay); Ashley Judd, Mira Sorvino, Josh Charles, Ron Rifkin, David Dukes, Peter Dobson, Taylor Nichols, John Rubinstein, Allan Corduner, Dana Goldstone, Micole Mercurio, Lindsay Crouse, John Apicella, Earl Boen, Kevin Bourland, Dennis Bowen, Nancy Linehan Charles, Jeffrey Combs, Steven Culp, Lou Cutell, Yvette Freeman, Beth Grant, Alex Henteloff, Lise Hilboldt, Scott Menville, Herb Mitchell, Marianne Muellerleile, Marianne Davis, Kelsey Mulrooney, Christopher Murray, Michael O'Neill, Howard Platt, Alyson Reed, John Roselius, Perry Stephens, Sam Anderson	
M A Y	22	Mission: Impossible	Paramount Pictures	Brian De Palma (director); David Koepp, Robert Towne (screenplay); Tom Cruise, Jon Voight, Emmanuelle Béart, Henry Czerny, Jean Reno, Ving Rhames, Kristin Scott Thomas, Vanessa Redgrave, Ingeborga Dapkunaite, Marek Vasut, John McLaughlin, Rolf Saxon, Karel Dobry, Andreas Wisniewski, Ricco Ross, Bob Friend, Annabel Mullion, Garrick Hagon, Jirina Trebicka, Olegar Fedoro, David Schneider, Tony Vogel, Morgan Deare, Ion Caramitru, Dale Dye, Marcel Iures, Emilio Estevez, Harry Fielder, John Knoll, Fred Wood	
M A Y	24	Spy Hard	Hollywood Pictures	Rick Friedberg (director); Dick Chudnow, Jason Friedberg, Aaron Seltzer (screenplay); Leslie Nielsen, Nicollette Sheridan, Charles Durning, Marcia Gay Harden, Barry Bostwick, Andy Griffith, John Ales, Elya Baskin, Mason Gamble, Carlos Lauchu, Stephanie Romanov, Dr. Joyce Brothers, Ray Charles, Hulk Hogan, Roger Clinton Jr., Robert Culp, Fabio, Robert Guillaume, Pat Morita, Talisa Soto, Mr. T, Alex Trebek, Taylor Negron, Clyde Kusatsu, Curtis Armstrong, Michael Berryman, Downtown Julie Brown, Stephen Burrows, Carl Ciarfalio, Wayne Cotter, Eddie Deezen, Johnny G, Loren & Ginger Janes, Bruce Gray, John Kassir, Sally Stevens, Thuy Trang, "Weird Al" Yankovic, Rawle D. Lewis, Angela Visser	
M A Y	24	Welcome to the Dollhouse	Sony Pictures Classics	Todd Solondz (director/screenplay); Heather Matarazzo, Brendan Sexton III, Eric Mabius, Matthew Faber, Darla Kalinina, Angela Pietropinto, Bill Buell, Dimitri DeFresco (Iervolino), Victoria Davis, Christina Brucato, Christina Vidal, Amouris Rainey, Siri Howard, Telly Pontidis, Herbie Duarte, Jared Solano, Scott Coogan, Josiah Trager, Ken Leung	
M A Y	31	The Arrival	Orion Pictures / Live Entertainment	David Twohy (director/screenplay); Charlie Sheen, Lindsay Crouse, Ron Silver, Teri Polo, Richard Schiff, Tony T. Johnson, Leon Rippy, David Villalpando, Buddy Joe Hooker	
M A Y	31	Dragonheart	Universal Pictures	Rob Cohen (director); Charles Edward Pogue (screenplay); Dennis Quaid, Sean Connery, David Thewlis, Pete Postlethwaite, Dina Meyer, Jason Isaacs, Brian Thompson, Julie Christie, Peter Hric, Terry O'Neill, John Gielgud	
M A Y	31	Eddie	Hollywood Pictures / Island Pictures	Steve Rash (director); Jon Connoly, David Loucka, Eric Champnella, Keith Mitchell, Steve Zacharias, Jeff Buhai (screenplay); Whoopi Goldberg, Frank Langella, Dennis Farina, Richard Jenkins, Lisa Ann Walter, John Benjamin Hickey, John Salley, Mark Jackson, Malik Sealy, Dwayne Schintzius, Rick Fox, Greg Ostertag, Vernel Singleton, John DiMaggio, Alex English, Dennis Rodman, Muggsy Bogues, Vinny Del Negro, Vlade Divac, Bobby Phills, J. R. Reid, Terrell Brandon, Brad Daugherty, Mitch Richmond, Avery Johnson, Corie Blount, Larry Johnson, Randy Brown, Olden Polynice, Scott Burrell, Gary Payton, Anthony Mason, Herb Williams, John Starks, Kurt Rambis, Chris Berman, Marv Albert, Walt Frazier, Donald Trump, Rudy Giuliani, Ed Koch, Fabio, David Letterman, Gene Anthony Ray	
J U N E	5	Heavy	Cinépix Film Properties	James Mangold (director/screenplay); Pruitt Taylor Vince, Shelley Winters, Liv Tyler, Deborah Harry, Joe Grifasi, Evan Dando, David Patrick Kelly, Marian Quinn, Meg Hartig, Zandy Hartig, Peter Ortel, J. C. MacKenzie, Allen D'Arcangelo	
J U N E	7	The Phantom	Paramount Pictures / The Ladd Company	Simon Wincer (director); Jeffrey Boam (screenplay); Billy Zane, Treat Williams, Kristy Swanson, Catherine Zeta-Jones, James Remar, Patrick McGoohan, Radmar Agana Jao, Robert Coleby, Cary-Hiroyuki Tagawa, Bill Smitrovich, Casey Siemaszko, David Proval, Joseph Ragno, Al Ruscio, Samantha Eggar, Jon Tenney, John Capodice	
J U N E	7	The Rock	Hollywood Pictures / Don Simpson/Jerry Bruckheimer Films	Michael Bay (director); David Weisberg, Douglas S. Cook, Mark Rosner (screenplay); Sean Connery, Nicolas Cage, Ed Harris, Michael Biehn, William Forsythe, David Morse, John Spencer, John C. McGinley, Tony Todd, Bokeem Woodbine, Gregory Sporleder, Vanessa Marcil, Claire Forlani, Howard Platt, David Marshall Grant, Greg Collins, Brendan Kelly, Steve Harris, Jim Maniaci, Stuart Wilson, John Laughlin, Danny Nucci, Stanley Anderson, Xander Berkeley, Philip Baker Hall, Anthony Clark, Sam Whipple, Todd Louiso, David Bowe, Marshall Teague, Harry Humphries, Willie Garson, Thomas J. Hageboeck, Dwight Hicks, Ralph Peduto, Raymond O'Connor, Luenell, Tom Towles, Jim Caviezel, John Enos III, Buck Kartalian, Raymond Cruz, Pat Skipper, Kevin Weisman	
J U N E	10	Paradise Lost: The Child Murders at Robin Hood Hills	HBO NYC Productions	Joe Berlinger, Bruce Sinofsky (directors); Jessie Misskelley Jr., Damien Echols, Jason Baldwin	
J U N E	14	The Cable Guy	Columbia Pictures	Ben Stiller (director); Lou Holtz Jr. (screenplay); Jim Carrey, Matthew Broderick, Leslie Mann, George Segal, Diane Baker, Jack Black, Ben Stiller, Eric Roberts, Owen Wilson, Charles Napier, Janeane Garofalo, David Cross, Andy Dick, Bob Odenkirk, Kyle Gass, Tommy Hinkley, Shawn Michael Howard, Jeff Kahn, Suli McCullough, Joel Murray, Kathy Griffin, Paul Greco, Aki Aleong, Dona Hardy, Michael Rivkin, Sean Whalen, Cynthia Lamontagne, Christopher Michael, Charles Knox Robinson III, John F. O'Donohue, Emilio Rivera, Annabelle Gurwitch, Blake Boyd, Tabitha Soren, Rikki Klieman, Conrad Janis, Christine Devine, Mark Thompson, Wendy Walsh, David Bowe, Bill Clinton, Alex D. Linz	
J U N E	14	Moll Flanders	Metro-Goldwyn-Mayer	Pen Densham (director/screenplay); Robin Wright, Morgan Freeman, Stockard Channing, John Lynch, Brenda Fricker, Geraldine James, Aisling Corcoran, Jeremy Brett, Britta Smith, Cathy Murphy, Emma McIvor, Maria Doyle Kennedy	
J U N E	14	Stealing Beauty	Fox Searchlight Pictures	Bernardo Bertolucci (director); Susan Minot (screenplay); Jeremy Irons, Liv Tyler, Joseph Fiennes, Sinead Cusack, Jean Marais, Donal McCann, D. W. Moffett, Stefania Sandrelli, Rachel Weisz, Rebecca Valpy, Carlo Cecchi, Jason Flemyng, Anna Maria Gherardi, Ignazio Oliva, Francesco Siciliano, Mary Jo Sorgani, Leonardo Treviglio, Alessandra Vanzi, Roberto Zibetti	
J U N E	15	Deadly Voyage	HBO NYC Productions	John Mackenzie (director); Stuart Urban (screenplay); Omar Epps, Joss Ackland, Sean Pertwee, David Suchet, Andrew Divoff, Jean-Claude La Marre, Adewale Akinnuoye-Agbaje, Ilia Volok, Roman Varshavsky, Chiwetel Ejiofor, Omanza Eugene Shaw, Henry Nartey, Oscar Provencal, Wakefield Ackuaku, David Dontoh, Maxine Burth, Michael Byrne, Ravil Isyanov, Tomas Lukes, Zillah Yao	
J U N E	15	Switchblade Sisters (re-release)	Centaur Releasing / Centaur Pictures	Jack Hill (director); F.X. Meier (screenplay); Robbie Lee, Joanne Nail, Monica Gayle, Asher Brauner, Chase Newhart, Marlene Clark, Kitty Bruce, Janice Karman, Don Stark, Kate Murtagh	
J U N E	19	A Perfect Candidate	Seventh Art Releasing	R.J. Cutler, David Van Taylor (directors); Chuck Robb, Oliver North, Don Baker, Peter Baker, Floyd Brown, Tim Carpenter, Bill Clinton, Marshall Coleman, G. Gordon Liddy, Mike Murphy, Lynda Johnson Robb, Douglas Wilder, Mark Goodin, Mark Merritt, Glen Bolger, Dr. David Demasters, Warren Fiske, Mike Gooding, David Jacobsen, Laurie Kellman, David Lerman, Susan Platt, Dr. Benjamin Robertson, Mark Walpole	
J U N E	21	Eraser	Warner Bros. Pictures	Chuck Russell (director); Tony Puryear, Walon Green (screenplay); Arnold Schwarzenegger, James Caan, Vanessa L. Williams, James Coburn, Robert Pastorelli, James Cromwell, Danny Nucci, Andy Romano, Joe Viterelli, Olek Krupa, Gerry Becker, Nick Chinlund, Michael Papajohn, K. Todd Freeman, Mark Rolston, John Slattery, Robert Miranda, Roma Maffia, Tony Longo, John Snyder, Rick Batalla, Skipp Sudduth, Sven-Ole Thorsen, Denis Forest, Patrick Kilpatrick	
J U N E	21	The Hunchback of Notre Dame	Walt Disney Pictures	Gary Trousdale, Kirk Wise (directors); Tab Murphy, Irene Mecchi, Bob Tzudiker, Noni White, Jonathan Roberts (screenplay); Tom Hulce, Demi Moore, Kevin Kline, Tony Jay, Paul Kandel, Jason Alexander, Charles Kimbrough, Mary Wickes, David Ogden Stiers, Bill Fagerbakke, Heidi Mollenhauer, Jane Withers, Mary Kay Bergman, Corey Burton, Jim Cummings, Patrick Pinney, Gary Trousdale, Frank Welker, Jack Angel, Bob Bergen, Susan Blu, Rodger Bumpass, Victoria Clark, Philip L. Clarke, Jennifer Darling, Debi Derryberry, Jonathan Dokuchitz, Bill Farmer, Dana Hill, Judy Kaye, Eddie Korbich, Michael Lindsay, Sherry Lynn, Mona Marshall, Howard McGillin, Phil Proctor, Jan Rabson, Kath Soucie, Gordon Stanley, Marcelo Tubert	
J U N E	21	Lone Star	Sony Pictures Classics / Castle Rock Entertainment	John Sayles (director/screenplay); Ron Canada, Chris Cooper, Clifton James, Kris Kristofferson, Matthew McConaughey, Frances McDormand, Joe Morton, Elizabeth Peña, Gabriel Casseus, Miriam Colon, Eddie Robinson, Stephen Mendillo, LaTanya Richardson, Jesse Borrego, Tony Plana, Oni Faida Lampley, Eleese Lester, Tony Frank, Gordon Tootoosis, Beatrice Winde, Chandra Wilson, Richard Reyes	
J U N E	28	The Nutty Professor	Universal Pictures / Imagine Entertainment	Tom Shadyac (director/screenplay); David Sheffield, Barry W. Blaustein, Steve Oedekerk (screenplay); Eddie Murphy, Jada Pinkett, James Coburn, Larry Miller, Dave Chappelle, John Ales, Jamal Mixon, Chao-Li Chi, Quinn Duffy, Montell Jordan, Doug Williams, David Ramsey, Chaz Lamar Shepherd, John Prosky, Steve Monroe, Lisa Boyle, Suzanne Somers	
J U N E	28	Striptease	Columbia Pictures / Castle Rock Entertainment	Andrew Bergman (director/screenplay); Demi Moore, Armand Assante, Ving Rhames, Robert Patrick, Burt Reynolds, Paul Guilfoyle, Rumer Willis, Robert Stanton, Stuart Pankin, Dina Spybey, PaSean Wilson, Pandora Peaks, Barbara Alyn Woods, Rena Riffel, Siobhan Fallon, Gary Basaraba, Gianni Russo, José Zúñiga, Eduardo Yáñez, Antoni Corone, Frances Fisher, Keone Young, Daphne Duplaix	
J U N E	30	Grand Avenue	HBO Pictures / Elsboy Entertainment / Wildwood Enterprises, Inc	Daniel Sackheim (director); Greg Sarris (screenplay); Irene Bedard, Tantoo Cardinal, Eloy Casados, Deena-Marie Consiglio, Alexis Cruz, Diane Debassige, Jenny Gago, Cody Lightning, A Martinez, Simi Mehta, August Schellenberg, Sheila Tousey, Sam Vlahos, Carmen Ahern, Delmar Billy, Rita Carillo, Patricia Garcia, Susan Harloe, Shar Jackson, Laurel Keith, Ron Kenoly, Jack Kohler, Zahn McClarnon, Miguel Nájera, Bruce Roberts, Anita Silva, Norris Young, Daniel Zacapa	

== July–September ==
Opening		Title	Production company	Cast and crew	Ref.
J U L Y	2	Theodore Rex	New Line Cinema	Jonathan Betuel (director/screenplay); Whoopi Goldberg, George Newbern, Carol Kane, Armin Mueller-Stahl, Juliet Landau, Bud Cort, Stephen McHattie, Richard Roundtree, Jack Riley, Peter Mackenzie, Joe Dallesandro, Susie Coelho, Edith Díaz, Hilary Shepard, Dee Booher, William Boyett, Jan Rabson, Rodger Bumpass, Jennifer Darling, Denise Dowse, Bill Farmer, Anne Lockhart, Sherry Lynn, Mickie McGowan, Patrick Pinney, Phil Proctor, Kevin Carlson, Charles Chiodo, Edward Chiodo, Steven Chiodo, Terri Hardin, Bruce Lanoil, Pons Maar, James Murray, Michelan Sisti, Calvin Scott, Hayward O. Coleman, Billy Bowles	
J U L Y	3	Independence Day	20th Century Fox / Centropolis Entertainment	Roland Emmerich (director/screenplay); Dean Devlin (screenplay); Will Smith, Bill Pullman, Jeff Goldblum, Margaret Colin, Mary McDonnell, Judd Hirsch, Robert Loggia, Randy Quaid, James Rebhorn, Vivica A. Fox, Harry Connick Jr., Harvey Fierstein, Adam Baldwin, Brent Spiner, James Duval, Kiersten Warren, Bill Smitrovich, Mae Whitman, Ross Bagley, Lisa Jakub, Giuseppe Andrews, Frank Novak, Devon Gummersall, Leland Orser, Raphael Sbarge, Bobby Hosea, Dan Lauria, Carlos Lacamara, John Bennett Perry, Tim Kelleher, Wayne Wilderson, Jay Acovone, Thom Barry, Jana Marie Hupp, Robert Pine, John Capodice, Mark Fite, Kristof Konrad, Randy Oglesby, Barry Del Sherman, Lyman Ward, Anthony Crivello, Richard Speight Jr., Sharon Tay, Christine Devine, Mark Thompson, Ernie Anastos, Rance Howard, Sayed Badreya, John Bradley, Kimberly Beck, Thomas F. Duffy, Andrew Keegan, Jon Matthews, Jim Piddock, Fred Barnes, Eleanor Clift, Jerry Dunphy, Jack Germond, Morton Kondracke, John McLaughlin, Barry Nolan, George Putnam, Pat Skipper, Malcolm Danare, Julie Moran, Frank Welker, Erick Avari, Dean Devlin, Daren Dochterman, Volker Engel, Vincent Schiavelli, Tracey Walter, John Storey, James Wong, Captain Michael 'Chewy' Vacca, Barbara Beck, Kevin Cooney, Joyce Cohen, Gary Hecker	
J U L Y	3	Phenomenon	Touchstone Pictures	Jon Turteltaub (director); Gerald Di Pego (screenplay); John Travolta, Kyra Sedgwick, Forest Whitaker, Robert Duvall, Jeffrey DeMunn, Richard Kiley, David Gallagher, Ashley Buccille, Brent Spiner, Elisabeth Nunziato, Tony Genaro, Sean O'Bryan, Michael Milhoan, Troy Evans, Bruce A. Young, Vyto Ruginis, Ellen Geer, James Keane, Mark Soper, Daniel Zacapa	
J U L Y	4	Special Effects: Anything Can Happen	IMAX Corporation / NOVA Giant Screen Films	Ben Burtt (director/screenplay); Susanne Simpson, Tom Friedman (screenplay); John Lithgow, Dennis Muren, Daniel Jeannette, Bruce Nicholson, Anthony Daniels, Volker Engel, Anna Foerster, Joe Viskocil, Paul Michael Glaser, Shaquille O'Neal, Alec Gillis, Tom Woodruff Jr., Jean Bolte, Carl N. Frederick, Paul Huston, Kate O'Neill, Ellen Poon, Alex Seiden, Pat Sweeney, Bob Ahmanson, Roderic 'Mick' Duff, Joe Heffernan, Bob Hurrie, Emmet Kane, Philipp Timme, Thomas Zeil, Charles Gibson, Liz Ralston, Tim Harrington	
J U L Y	10	Harriet the Spy	Paramount Pictures / Nickelodeon Movies / Rastar Productions	Bronwen Hughes (director); Douglas Petrie, Theresa Rebeck (screenplay); Michelle Trachtenberg, Gregory Smith, Rosie O'Donnell, Vanessa Lee Chester, J. Smith-Cameron, Robert Joy, Eartha Kitt, Charlotte Sullivan, Teisha Kim, Cecilley Carroll, Dov Tiefenbach, Nina Shock, Connor Devitt, Alisha Morrison, Nancy Beatty, James Gilfillan, Gerry Quigley, Jackie Richardson, Roger Clown	
J U L Y	12	Courage Under Fire	20th Century Fox / Fox 2000 Pictures	Edward Zwick (director); Patrick Sheane Duncan (screenplay); Denzel Washington, Meg Ryan, Lou Diamond Phillips, Michael Moriarty, Matt Damon, Bronson Pinchot, Seth Gilliam, Scott Glenn, Regina Taylor, Željko Ivanek, Tim Guinee, Tim Ransom, Sean Astin, Ned Vaughn, Sean Patrick Thomas, Manny Pérez, Ken Jenkins, Kathleen Widdoes, Christina Stojanovich, Tom Schanley, Korey Coleman, David McSwain	
J U L Y	13	Don't Look Back	HBO Pictures / Alphaville Films	Geoff Murphy (director); Tom Epperson, Billy Bob Thornton (screenplay); Eric Stoltz, John Corbett, Josh Hamilton, Billy Bob Thornton, Annabeth Gish, Dwight Yoakam, Amanda Plummer, R. G. Armstrong, Ja'net DuBois, M. C. Gainey, Chris Hogan, Mickey Jones, Jim Metzler, Brent Besselman, Rodger Boyce, Henry Brown, Troy Curvey Jr., Bobby Fernandez-Hewitt, Fabio Fernández, Cameron Finley, Peter Fonda, Mellara Gold, Jerry Haynes, Blake Heron, Angee Hughes, Ari Magder, Heather Ogilvie, Vicellous Reon Shannon, Ethan Suplee, Craig Susser, Lahmard J. Tate, Susan Traylor, Reno Wilson	
J U L Y	17	Kazaam	Touchstone Pictures / Interscope Communications	Paul M. Glaser (director/screenplay); Christian Ford, Roger Soffer (screenplay); Shaquille O'Neal, Francis Capra, Ally Walker, James Acheson, John Costelloe, Marshall Manesh, Mother Love, Wade J. Robson, Efren Ramirez, Anthony Ferar, Steven Barr, Deidra "Spin" Roper, Da Brat, Deborah Rennard, Bob Clendenin, Fawn Reed, Brandon Durand, Jake Glaser, Jonathan Carrasco, Jesse Perez, Juan "Rambo" Reynoso, Randall Bosley	
J U L Y	17	Multiplicity	Columbia Pictures	Harold Ramis (director/screenplay); Chris Miller, Mary Hale, Lowell Ganz, Babaloo Mandel (screenplay); Michael Keaton, Andie MacDowell, Harris Yulin, Richard Masur, Eugene Levy, Ann Cusack, John de Lancie, Judith Kahan, Brian Doyle-Murray, Obba Babatundé, Julie Bowen, Steven Kampmann, Michael Milhoan, Skip Stellrecht, Jim Piddock, Robin Duke, Robert Ridgely, Glenn Shadix, Dawn Maxey, Kari Coleman, Zack Duhame, Katie Schlossberg	
J U L Y	17	Walking and Talking	Miramax Films	Nicole Holofcener (director/screenplay); Catherine Keener, Anne Heche, Todd Field, Liev Schreiber, Kevin Corrigan, Randall Batinkoff, Vincent Pastore, Joseph Siravo, Allison Janney	
J U L Y	19	Fled	Metro-Goldwyn-Mayer	Kevin Hooks (director); Preston A. Whitmore II (screenplay); Laurence Fishburne, Stephen Baldwin, Will Patton, Robert John Burke, Salma Hayek, Robert Hooks, Victor Rivers, David Dukes, Ken Jenkins, Michael Nader, Brittney Powell, Steve Carlisle, Brett Rice, J. Don Ferguson, Kathy Payne	
J U L Y	19	The Frighteners	Universal Pictures	Peter Jackson (director/screenplay); Fran Walsh (screenplay); Michael J. Fox, Trini Alvarado, Peter Dobson, John Astin, Dee Wallace Stone, Jeffrey Combs, Jake Busey, Chi McBride, Jim Fyfe, Troy Evans, Julianna McCarthy, R. Lee Ermey, Elizabeth Hawthorne, Peter Jackson, Melanie Lynskey, Angela Bloomfield	
J U L Y	19	Trainspotting	Miramax Films / PolyGram Filmed Entertainment	Danny Boyle (director); John Hodge (screenplay); Ewan McGregor, Ewen Bremner, Jonny Lee Miller, Kevin McKidd, Robert Carlyle, Kelly Macdonald, Peter Mullan, James Cosmo, Shirley Henderson, Stuart McQuarrie, Irvine Welsh, Kevin Allen, Keith Allen, Dale Winton, Vincent Friell, Hugh Ross, John Hodge, Archie Macpherson, Stuart McGugan, John Tartaglia, Susan Vidler, Eileen Nicholas, Lauren and Devon Lamb	
J U L Y	19	Willy Wonka & the Chocolate Factory (re-release)	Warner Bros. Pictures / Wolper Pictures / The Quaker Oats Company	Mel Stuart (director); Roald Dahl (screenplay); Gene Wilder, Jack Albertson, Peter Ostrum, Roy Kinnear, Julie Dawn Cole, Leonard Stone, Denise Nickerson, Dodo Denney, Paris Themmen, Ursula Reit, Michael Böllner, Diana Sowle, Aubrey Woods, David Battley, Günter Meisner, Peter Capell, Werner Heyking, Peter Stuart, Franziska Liebing, Dora Altmann, Ernst Ziegler, Victor Beaumont, Frank Delfino, Gloria Manon, Stephen Dunne, Tim Brooke-Taylor, Ed Peck, Pat Coombs, George Claydon, Malcolm Dixon, Rusty Goffe, Angelo Muscat, Rudy Borgstaller, Ismed Hassan, Norman McGlen, Pepe Poupee, Marcus Powell, Albert Wilkinson	
J U L Y	24	A Time to Kill	Warner Bros. Pictures / Regency Enterprises	Joel Schumacher (director); Akiva Goldsman (screenplay); Sandra Bullock, Samuel L. Jackson, Matthew McConaughey, Kevin Spacey, Brenda Fricker, Oliver Platt, Charles S. Dutton, Ashley Judd, Patrick McGoohan, Donald Sutherland, Kiefer Sutherland, Tonea Stewart, Rae'Ven Larrymore Kelly, John Diehl, Chris Cooper, Nicky Katt, Doug Hutchison, Kurtwood Smith, Beth Grant, Joe Seneca, Anthony Heald, Alexandra Kyle, Andy Stahl, Jonathan Hadary, Benjamin Mouton, Greg Lauren, Mike Pniewski, Elizabeth Omilami, Wayne Dehart, Octavia Spencer, Leonard L. Thomas, Steve Coulter, M. Emmet Walsh	
J U L Y	26	The Adventures of Pinocchio	New Line Cinema / Savoy Pictures / The Kushner-Locke Company	Steve Barron (director/screenplay); Sherry Mills, Tom Benedek, Barry Berman (screenplay); Martin Landau, Jonathan Taylor Thomas, Genevieve Bujold, Udo Kier, Bebe Neuwirth, Rob Schneider, Corey Carrier, Dawn French, Richard Claxton, Joe Swash, John Sessions, Jerry Hadley, Jean-Claude Dreyfus, David Doyle (voice)	
J U L Y	26	Joe's Apartment	Geffen Pictures / MTV Films	John Payson (director/screenplay); Jerry O'Connell, Megan Ward, Jim Turner, Sandra Denton, Robert Vaughn, Don Ho, Jim Sterling, Shiek Mahmud-Bey, David Huddleston, Vincent Pastore, Paul Bartel, Richard "Moby" Hall, Graham Dewer, Nick Zedd, Solange Monnier, Rockapella, Billy West, Reginald Hudlin, BD Wong, Dave Chappelle, Tim Blake Nelson, Godfrey, Rick Aviles	
J U L Y	26	Kingpin	Metro-Goldwyn-Mayer / Rysher Entertainment / Motion Picture Corporation of America	Peter Farrelly, Robert Farrelly (directors); Barry Fanaro, Mort Nathan (screenplay); Woody Harrelson, Randy Quaid, Vanessa Angel, Bill Murray, Chris Elliott, William Jordan, Richard Tyson, Lin Shaye, Zen Gesner, Rob Moran, Daniel Greene, Will Rothhaar, Sayed Badreya, Danny Murphy, Mike Cerrone, Michael Corrente, Willie Garson, Michele Matheson, Andre Rosey Brown, Lorri Bagley, Chris Berman, Chris Schenkel, P.W. Evans, Roger Clemens, Parker Bohn III, Randy Pedersen, Mark Roth, Jonathan Richman, Urge Overkill, John Popper, Blues Traveler	
J U L Y	26	Manny & Lo	Sony Pictures Classics	Lisa Krueger (director); Lisa King (screenplay); Scarlett Johansson, Aleksa Palladino, Mary Kay Place, Dean Silvers, Marlen Hecht, Forrest Silvers, Tyler Silvers, Lisa Campion, Glenn Fitzgerald, Novella Nelson, Angie Phillips, Cameron Boyd, Paul Guilfoyle, Tony Arnaud, Nicholas Lent, Susan Decker, Marla Zuk, Bonnie Johnson, Melissa Johnson	
J U L Y	26	The Pompatus of Love	BMG Independents / Cinépix Film Properties	Richard Schenkman (director/screenplay); Jon Cryer, Adam Oliensis (screenplay); Jon Cryer, Mia Sara, Jennifer Tilly, Tim Guinee, Adrian Pasdar, Kristin Scott Thomas, Paige Turco, Arabella Field, Dana Wheeler-Nicholson, Adam Oliensis, Kristen Wilson, Charlie Murphy, Roscoe Lee Browne, Renee Props, Jim Turner, Fisher Stevens, Michael McKean, Angela Featherstone, Richard Schenkman	
A U G U S T	2	Chain Reaction	20th Century Fox	Andrew Davis (director); J. F. Lawton, Michael Bortman (screenplay); Keanu Reeves, Morgan Freeman, Rachel Weisz, Fred Ward, Kevin Dunn, Brian Cox, Joanna Cassidy, Chelcie Ross, Nicholas Rudall, Tzi Ma, Krzysztof Pieczyński, Godfrey, Gene Barge, Nathan Davis, Johnny Lee Davenport, James Sie, Ned Schmidtke, Ron Dean, Neil Flynn, Margaret Travolta, Pam Zekman, David Pasquesi, Danny Goldring, Eddie Bo Smith Jr., Dick Cusack, Michael Shannon, Mark Morettini, Jim Ortlieb, Mike Gray	
A U G U S T	2	Emma	Miramax Films	Douglas McGrath (director/screenplay); Gwyneth Paltrow, Toni Collette, Alan Cumming, Ewan McGregor, Jeremy Northam, Greta Scacchi, Juliet Stevenson, Polly Walker, Sophie Thompson, James Cosmo, Denys Hawthorne, Phyllida Law, Kathleen Byron, Karen Westwood, Edward Woodall, Brian Capron, Angela Down, John Franklyn-Robbins, Ruth Jones	
A U G U S T	2	Matilda	TriStar Pictures / Jersey Films	Danny DeVito (director); Nicholas Kazan, Robin Swicord (screenplay); Mara Wilson, Danny DeVito, Rhea Perlman, Embeth Davidtz, Pam Ferris, Paul Reubens, Tracey Walter, Brian Levinson, Jean Speegle Howard, R.D. Robb, Goliath Gregory, Kiami Davael, Leor Livneh Hackel, Jacqueline Steiger, Jimmy Karz, Michael Valentine, Liam Kearns, Mark Watson, Kira Spencer Hesser, Marion Dugan, Rachel Snow, Christel Khalil, Sabrina Bryan, Jon Lovitz	
A U G U S T	2	Phat Beach	LIVE Entertainment / Orion Pictures	Doug Ellin (director); Ben Morris, Brian E. O'Neal, Cleveland O'Neal III, Doug Ellin (screenplay); Jermaine Hopkins, Brian Hooks, Gregg Vance, Claudia Kaleem, Coolio, Eric Fleeks, Alma Collins, Candice Merideth, Jennifer Lucienne, Sabrina De Pina, Tommy "Tiny" Lister Jr.	
A U G U S T	9	Basquiat	Miramax Films	Julian Schnabel (director/screenplay); Lech J. Majewski, John Bowe (screenplay); Jeffrey Wright, David Bowie, Benicio del Toro, Dennis Hopper, Gary Oldman, Michael Wincott, Courtney Love, Claire Forlani, Parker Posey, Elina Lowensohn, Paul Bartel, Tatum O'Neal, Christopher Walken, Willem Dafoe, Sam Rockwell	
A U G U S T	9	Escape from L.A.	Paramount Pictures / Rysher Entertainment	John Carpenter (director/screenplay); Debra Hill, Kurt Russell (screenplay); Kurt Russell, Stacy Keach, Steve Buscemi, Peter Fonda, Georges Corraface, Cliff Robertson, Michelle Forbes, Valeria Golino, Pam Grier, Bruce Campbell, A.J. Langer, Ina Romeo, Peter Jason, Jordan Baker, Caroleen Feeney, Paul Bartel, Tom McNulty, Jeff Imada, Breckin Meyer, Robert Carradine, Shelly Desai, Leland Orser	
A U G U S T	9	Jack	Hollywood Pictures / American Zoetrope	Francis Ford Coppola (director); James DeMonaco, Gary Nadeau (screenplay); Robin Williams, Diane Lane, Jennifer Lopez, Bill Cosby, Fran Drescher, Brian Kerwin, Adam Zolotin, Todd Bosley, Seth Smith, Mario Yedidia, Michael McKean, Allan Rich, Keone Young, Jurnee Smollett, Allison Whitbeck, Dwight Hicks, Mark Coppola, Al Nalbandian	
A U G U S T	13	Aladdin and the King of Thieves	Walt Disney Home Video	Tad Stones (director); Mark McCorkle, Robert Schooley (screenplay); Scott Weinger, Robin Williams, Linda Larkin, Gilbert Gottfried, John Rhys-Davies, Jerry Orbach, Frank Welker, Val Bettin, Jim Cummings, CCH Pounder, Jeff Bennett, Corey Burton, Brad Kane, Liz Callaway, Jess Harnell, Clyde Kusatsu, Rob Paulsen, Bruce Adler, Bill Farmer, David Friedman, Paul Kandel, Marin Mazzie, Patrick Pinney, Phil Proctor, Gordon Stanley, Merwin Foard	
A U G U S T	14	Alaska	Columbia Pictures / Castle Rock Entertainment	Fraser Clarke Heston (director); Andy Burg, Scott Myers (screenplay); Thora Birch, Vincent Kartheiser, Dirk Benedict, Charlton Heston, Duncan Fraser, Gordon Tootoosis, Ben Cardinal, Ryan Kent, Don S. Davis, Dolly Madsen, Stephen E. Miller, Byron Chief-Moon, Kristin Lehman	
A U G U S T	14	House Arrest	Metro-Goldwyn-Mayer / Rysher Entertainment	Harry Winer (director); Michael Hitchcock (screenplay); Jamie Lee Curtis, Kevin Pollak, Jennifer Tilly, Christopher McDonald, Wallace Shawn, Jennifer Love Hewitt, Kyle Howard, Ray Walston, Caroline Aaron, Sheila McCarthy, Amy Sakasitz, Mooky Arizona, Herbert Russell, Ben Stein, Alex Seitz, Josh Wolford	
A U G U S T	16	Tales from the Crypt presents Bordello of Blood	Universal Pictures	Gilbert Adler (director/screenplay); A.L. Katz (screenplay); Dennis Miller, Erika Eleniak, Angie Everhart, Chris Sarandon, Corey Feldman, Aubrey Morris, Phil Fondacaro, John Kassir, Juliet Reagh, Eli Gabay, Matt Hill, Eric Keenleyside, Robert Munic, William Sadler, Whoopi Goldberg	
A U G U S T	16	The Fan	TriStar Pictures / Mandalay Entertainment	Tony Scott (director); Phoef Sutton (screenplay); Robert De Niro, Wesley Snipes, Benicio del Toro, John Leguizamo, Patti D'Arbanville, Ellen Barkin, Charles Hallahan, Brandon Hammond, Andrew J. Ferchland, Chris Mulkey, John Kruk, Dan Butler, Kurt Fuller, Stanley DeSantis, Don S. Davis, Michael Jace, M. C. Gainey, Aaron Neville, Jack Black, Stoney Jackson, Brad William Henke, Drew Snyder, Edith Díaz, Wayne Duvall, Joe Pichler, James G. MacDonald, Tuesday Knight, Eric Bruskotter, Michael Byrne, Roger Lodge, Thomas F. Duffy, Chanté Moore, Paul Herman, Richard Riehle, Earl Billings, John Carroll Lynch, Tim Monsion	
A U G U S T	16	Kansas City	Fine Line Features	Robert Altman (director/screenplay); Frank Barhydt (screenplay); Jennifer Jason Leigh, Miranda Richardson, Harry Belafonte, Michael Murphy, Steve Buscemi, Dermot Mulroney, Brooke Smith, Jane Adams, Martin Martin, Frederick Louis Richardson	
A U G U S T	16	Tin Cup	Warner Bros. Pictures / Regency Enterprises	Ron Shelton (director/screenplay); John Norville (screenplay); Kevin Costner, Rene Russo, Cheech Marin, Don Johnson, Rex Linn, Linda Hart, Dennis Burkley, Lou Myers, Richard Lineback, George Perez, Mickey Jones, Michael Milhoan, Jim Nantz, Ken Venturi, Ben Wright, Phil Mickelson, Craig Stadler, John Cook, Johnny Miller, Lee Janzen, Billy Mayfair, Corey Pavin, Fred Couples, Peter Jacobsen, Gary McCord, Frank Chirkinian, Peter Kostis, Jimmy Roberts, George Michael, Lance Barrow, Brian Hammonds	
A U G U S T	16	The Wife	Artistic License	Tom Noonan (director/screenplay); Tom Noonan, Wallace Shawn, Karen Young, Julie Hagerty	
A U G U S T	17	Gotti	HBO Pictures	Robert Harmon (director); Steve Shagan (screenplay); Armand Assante, William Forsythe, Anthony Quinn, Vincent Pastore, Frank Vincent, Richard C. Sarafian, Dominic Chianese, Raymond Serra, Tony Sirico, Al Waxman, Scott Cohen, Robert Miranda, Marc Lawrence, Alberta Watson, Tony De Santis, Gil Filar, Gerry Mendicino, Yank Azman, Frank Crudele, Frank Pellegrino, Nigel Bennett, Marvin Goldhar, Tracey Hoyt, Colin Mochrie, Tedde Moore, George T. Odom, Joe Pingue, Karl Pruner, Barbara Radecki, Vlasta Vrana, Aidan Devine, Vincent Curatola	
A U G U S T	20	Darkman III: Die Darkman Die	MCA Universal Home Video / Renaissance Pictures	Bradford May (director); Michael Colleary, Mike Werb (screenplay); Arnold Vosloo, Jeff Fahey, Darlanne Fluegel, Roxann Dawson, Nigel Bennett, John Novak, Shawn Doyle, Joel Bissonnette, Von Flores, Walker Boone, Ronn Sarosiak, Peter Graham, Vieslav Krystyan, Chris Adams, Rick Parker, Alicia Panetta, Christopher Bondy, Eric Hollo, Bob Windsor, Lorne Cossette, Diana Platts	
A U G U S T	21	Girls Town	October Films	Jim McKay (director/screenplay); Denise Casano, Anna Grace, Bruklin Harris, Lili Taylor (screenplay); Lili Taylor, Bruklin Harris, Anna Grace, Aunjanue Ellis, Asia Minor, Michael Imperioli, John Ventimiglia, Guillermo Díaz, Nathaniel Freeman, Tom Gilroy, Ernestine Jackson, Ramya Pratt, Carl Kwaku Ford, Mary Joy, Tara Carnes, Yassira, Stephanie Berry	
A U G U S T	23	Carpool	Warner Bros. Pictures / Regency Enterprises	Arthur Hiller (director); Mark Christopher, Don Rhymer (screenplay); Tom Arnold, David Paymer, Rhea Perlman, Kim Coates, Rachael Leigh Cook, Rod Steiger, Colleen Rennison, Ian Tracey, David Kaye, Obba Babatundé, Alan Van Sprang, Michael Dobson, Dave "Squatch" Ward, Jewel Staite, Edie McClurg, Kathleen Freeman, Miriam Flynn, Mikey Kovar, Micah Gardener, Jordan Blake Warkol, John Trench, Stellina Rusich	
A U G U S T	23	The Island of Dr. Moreau	New Line Cinema	John Frankenheimer (director); Richard Stanley, Ron Hutchinson (screenplay); Marlon Brando, Val Kilmer, David Thewlis, Fairuza Balk, Temuera Morrison, Nelson de la Rosa, Mark Dacascos, Ron Perlman, Marco Hofschneider, William Hootkins, Frank Welker, Daniel Rigney, Peter Elliott, Miguel Lopez	
A U G U S T	23	She's the One	Fox Searchlight Pictures	Edward Burns (director/screenplay); Edward Burns, Mike McGlone, Cameron Diaz, Jennifer Aniston, Maxine Bahns, John Mahoney, Leslie Mann, Amanda Peet, Frank Vincent, Anita Gillette, Malachy McCourt, Robert Weil, Beatrice Winde, Tom Tammi, Raymond De Marco, Ron Farrell	
A U G U S T	23	Solo	Triumph Films	Norberto Barba (director); David L. Corley (screenplay); Mario Van Peebles, Barry Corbin, William Sadler, Adrien Brody, Demián Bichir, Jaime Gomez, Seidy Lopez, Abraham Verduzco, Joaquin Garrido	
A U G U S T	23	The Spitfire Grill	Columbia Pictures / Castle Rock Entertainment	Lee David Zlotoff (director/screenplay); Alison Elliott, Ellen Burstyn, Marcia Gay Harden, Will Patton, Kieran Mulroney, Gailard Sartain, John M. Jackson	
A U G U S T	23	A Very Brady Sequel	Paramount Pictures / The Ladd Company	Arlene Sanford (director); Harry Elfont, Deborah Kaplan (screenplay); Shelley Long, Gary Cole, Tim Matheson, Henriette Mantel, Christine Taylor, Christopher Daniel Barnes, Jennifer Elise Cox, Paul Sutera, Olivia Hack, Jesse Lee, John Hillerman, Whip Hubley, Whitney Rydbeck, RuPaul, David Ramsey, Phil Buckman, Steven Gilborn, Zsa Zsa Gabor, Skip O'Brien, Jennifer Aspen, Brian Van Holt, Bodhi Pine Elfman, Richard Belzer, Connie Ray, Barbara Eden, Maureen McCormick, Rosie O'Donnell, David Spade	
A U G U S T	30	The Crow: City of Angels	Miramax Films / Dimension Films	Tim Pope (director); David S. Goyer (screenplay); Vincent Pérez, Mia Kirshner, Richard Brooks, Iggy Pop, Thuy Trang, Thomas Jane, Ian Dury, Vincent Castellanos, Eric Acosta, Beverley Mitchell, Tracey Ellis, Alan Gelfant, Deftones	
A U G U S T	30	First Kid	Walt Disney Pictures / Caravan Pictures	David M. Evans (director); Tim Kelleher (screenplay); Sinbad, Brock Pierce, Robert Guillaume, Timothy Busfield, Zachery Ty Bryan, James Naughton, Art LaFleur, Lisa Eichhorn, Blake Boyd, Erin Williby, Bill Cobbs, Tomas Arana, Sonny Bono, Sean "Oleus" Sullivan, Bill Clinton, Jonathan Cabot Wade	
A U G U S T	30	The Stupids	New Line Cinema / Savoy Pictures	John Landis (director); Brent Forrester (screenplay); Tom Arnold, Jessica Lundy, Bug Hall, Alex McKenna, Mark Metcalf, Bob Keeshan, Christopher Lee, Matt Keeslar, Frankie Faison, David Ferry, Rolonda Watts, Max Landis, Jenny McCarthy, Atom Egoyan, Norman Jewison, Robert Wise, David Cronenberg, Gillo Pontecorvo, Costa-Gavras, Gurinder Chadha, Mick Garris, Jeremy Ratchford, Harvey Atkin, Anthony J. Mifsud, Scott Kraft, Victor Ertmanis, George Chiang, Garry Robbins, Sherry Miller, Philip Akin, Rick Avery, Michael Bell	
A U G U S T	30	The Trigger Effect	Gramercy Pictures / Amblin Entertainment	David Koepp (director/screenplay); Kyle MacLachlan, Elisabeth Shue, Dermot Mulroney, Richard T. Jones, Bill Smitrovich, Philip Bruns, Michael Rooker, Jack Noseworthy, Richard Schiff	
S E P T E M B E R	1	The Prisoner of Zenda, Inc.	Showtime Networks / Hallmark Entertainment	Stefan Scaini (director); Richard Clark, Rodman Gregg (screenplay); Jonathan Jackson, William Shatner, Jay Brazeau, Richard Lee Jackson, Don S. Davis, Katharine Isabelle, Jed Rees, Mark Acheson, Howard Dell, Demetri Goritsas, David Kaye, Michael Kopsa, Campbell Lane, Jesse Moss, Jewel Staite, Richard Yee, Mig Macario, Bobby Stewart, Michael Sugar, John Tench, Sean Amsing, Alan Robertson, Stephen E. Miller	
S E P T E M B E R	3	Stonewall	Strand Releasing	Nigel Finch (director); Rikki Beadle-Blair (screenplay); Guillermo Díaz, Frederick Weller, Duane Boutte, Bruce MacVittie, Dwight Ewell, Matthew Faber, Michael McElroy, Luis Guzmán, Joey Dedio, Brendan Corbalis, Peter Ratray	
S E P T E M B E R	6	The Big Squeeze	First Look International	Marcus DeLeon (director/screenplay); Lara Flynn Boyle, Danny Nucci, Peter Dobson, Luca Bercovici, Valente Rodriguez, Raye Birk, Janet MacLachlan, Tony Genaro, Laura Cerón, Demetrius Navarro, Michael Chieffo, Bert Santos, Teresa DiSpina, Sam Vlahos	
S E P T E M B E R	6	Bogus	Warner Bros. Pictures / Regency Enterprises	Norman Jewison (director); Alvin Sargent (screenplay); Whoopi Goldberg, Gérard Depardieu, Haley Joel Osment, Nancy Travis, Andrea Martin, Denis Mercier, Ute Lemper, Sheryl Lee Ralph, Barbara Hamilton, Al Waxman, Fiona Reid, Kevin Jackson, Richard Portnow, Stefan Batory, Mo Gaffney, Don Francks, Jackie Richardson, Damon D'Oliveira, Tabitha Lupien	
S E P T E M B E R	6	Bulletproof	Universal Pictures	Ernest R. Dickerson (director); Joe Gayton, Lewis Colick (screenplay); Damon Wayans, Adam Sandler, James Caan, Jeep Swenson, James Farentino, Kristen Wilson, Larry McCoy, Allen Covert, Bill Nunn, Mark Roberts, Monica Potter, Jonathan Loughran, Steve White, Bill Capizzi, Xander Berkeley, David Labiosa, Conrad Goode, Maury Sterling, Sven-Ole Thorsen	
S E P T E M B E R	6	Killer: A Journal of Murder	Legacy Releasing Corporation	Tim Metcalfe (director/screenplay); James Woods, Robert Sean Leonard, Cara Buono, Ellen Greene, Robert John Burke, Steve Forrest, Richard Riehle, Harold Gould, John Bedford Lloyd, Jeffrey DeMunn, Conrad McLaren, Christopher Petrosino, Michael Jeffrey Woods, Raynor Scheine, Seth Romatelli, Lili Taylor	
S E P T E M B E R	6	Sweet Nothing	Warner Bros. Pictures	Gary Winick (director); Lee Drysdale (screenplay); Michael Imperioli, Mira Sorvino, Paul Calderón, Patrick Breen, Maria Tucci, Chris Marquette, Brian Tarantina, Sean Marquette, George T. Odom, Richard Bright, Chuck Cooper, Michael Sorvino, Lisa Louise Langford, Joyce Phillips, Michelle Casey, Carlos Yensi, Jean-Claude LaMarre, Bruce Smolanoff, William Rothlein, Anibal O. Lleras, Billie Neal, John E. O'Keefe	
S E P T E M B E R	13	American Buffalo	The Samuel Goldwyn Company	Michael Corrente (director); David Mamet (screenplay); Dustin Hoffman, Dennis Franz, Sean Nelson	
S E P T E M B E R	13	Feeling Minnesota	Fine Line Features	Steven Baigelman (director/screenplay); Keanu Reeves, Cameron Diaz, Vincent D'Onofrio, Delroy Lindo, Dan Aykroyd, Courtney Love, Tuesday Weld, Aaron Michael Metchik, Michael Rispoli, Arabella Field, John Carroll Lynch, Max Perlich	
S E P T E M B E R	13	Fly Away Home	Columbia Pictures	Carroll Ballard (director); Bill Lishman, Robert Rodat, Vince McKewin (screenplay); Jeff Daniels, Anna Paquin, Dana Delany, Terry Kinney, Holter Graham, Jeremy Ratchford, Deborah Verginella, Michael J. Reynolds, David Hemblen, Ken James, Nora Ballard, Sarena Paton, Chris Benson, Gladys O'Connor	
S E P T E M B E R	13	Grace of My Heart	Gramercy Pictures	Allison Anders (director/screenplay); Illeana Douglas, Matt Dillon, Eric Stoltz, John Turturro, Patsy Kensit, Bruce Davison, Jennifer Leigh Warren, Bridget Fonda, Chris Isaak, David Clennon, Lucinda Jenney, Christina Pickles, Lynne Adams, Richard Schiff, Peter Fonda, Natalie Venetia Belcon, Tracy Vilar, Jill Sobule, Tegan West, Drena De Niro, Amanda de Cadenet, J. Mascis, China Kantner, Shawn Colvin, Kristen Vigard	
S E P T E M B E R	13	Maximum Risk	Columbia Pictures	Ringo Lam (director); Larry Ferguson (screenplay); Jean-Claude Van Damme, Natasha Henstridge, Jean-Hugues Anglade, Zach Grenier, Paul Ben-Victor, Frank Senger	
S E P T E M B E R	13	The Rich Man's Wife	Hollywood Pictures / Caravan Pictures	Amy Holden Jones (director/screenplay); Halle Berry, Peter Greene, Clive Owen, Christopher McDonald, Frankie Faison, Charles Hallahan, Clea Lewis, Allan Rich, Loyda Ramos, Alexandra Hedison, John Paragon, Kelly Jo Minter, Greg Serano, Rolando Molina, Valente Rodriguez	
S E P T E M B E R	14	Crime of the Century	HBO Pictures / Astoria Productions, Ltd.	Mark Rydell (director); William Nicholson (screenplay); Stephen Rea, Isabella Rossellini, J.T. Walsh, Michael Moriarty, Allen Garfield, John Harkins, Barry Primus, David Paymer, Bert Remsen, Don Harvey, Gerald S. O'Loughlin, Stefan Gierasch, Jay Acovone, Vyto Ruginis, Burt Brinckerhoff, Mickey Knox, Clayton Landey, Edita Brychta, Kirk B. R. Woller, Brad Greenquist, David St. James, Robert Clotworthy, Jon Manfrellotti, Vito D'Ambrosio, Scott N. Stevens	
S E P T E M B E R	20	Big Night	The Samuel Goldwyn Company	Campbell Scott, Stanley Tucci (directors); Joseph Tropiano, Stanley Tucci (screenplay); Stanley Tucci, Tony Shalhoub, Minnie Driver, Ian Holm, Isabella Rossellini, Marc Anthony, Allison Janney, Campbell Scott, Susan Floyd, Pasquale Cajano, Robert W. Castle, Andre Belgrader, Gene Canfield, Liev Schreiber	
S E P T E M B E R	20	The First Wives Club	Paramount Pictures	Hugh Wilson (director); Robert Harling, Paul Rudnick (screenplay); Bette Midler, Goldie Hawn, Diane Keaton, Maggie Smith, Dan Hedaya, Victor Garber, Bronson Pinchot, Marcia Gay Harden, Eileen Heckart, Philip Bosco, Elizabeth Berkley, Jennifer Dundas, Sarah Jessica Parker, Stephen Collins, Stockard Channing, Ari Greenberg, Timothy Olyphant, Aida Linares, Ivana Trump, Kathie Lee Gifford, Ed Koch, Gloria Steinem, James Naughton, Heather Locklear, Edward Hibbert, J.K. Simmons, Rob Reiner, Gregg Edelman, Debra Monk, Kate Burton, Walter Bobbie	
S E P T E M B E R	20	Giant (re-release)	Warner Bros. Pictures	George Stevens (director); Fred Guiol, Ivan Moffat (screenplay); Elizabeth Taylor, Rock Hudson, James Dean, Carroll Baker, Jane Withers, Chill Wills, Mercedes McCambridge, Sal Mineo, Dennis Hopper, Robert Nichols, Fran Bennett, Earl Holliman, Elsa Cárdenas, Paul Fix, Judith Evelyn, Carolyn Craig, Rod Taylor, Charles Watts, Maurice Jara, Alexander Scourby, Mickey Simpson, Noreen Nash, Nick Adams	
S E P T E M B E R	20	Last Man Standing	New Line Cinema	Walter Hill (director/screenplay); Bruce Willis, Christopher Walken, Bruce Dern, William Sanderson, David Patrick Kelly, Karina Lombard, Ned Eisenberg, Michael Imperioli, R. D. Call, Alexandra Powers, Ken Jenkins, Ted Markland, Leslie Mann, Patrick Kilpatrick	
S E P T E M B E R	20	Surviving Picasso	Warner Bros. Pictures	James Ivory (director); Ismail Merchant, David L. Wolper (screenplay); Anthony Hopkins, Natascha McElhone, Julianne Moore, Joss Ackland, Peter Eyre, Jane Lapotaire, Joseph Maher, Bob Peck, Diane Venora, Joan Plowright, Dennis Boutsikaris, Peter Gerety, Susannah Harker, Dominic West, Laura Aikman, Nigel Whitmey, Leon Lissek, Andreas Wisniewski, Anthony Milner, Tom Fisher, Vernon Dobtcheff, Hamish McColl, Sandor Eles, Brigitte Kahn, Olegar Fedoro, Rose English, Judith Sharp	
S E P T E M B E R	27	2 Days in the Valley	Metro-Goldwyn-Mayer / Rysher Entertainment	John Herzfeld (director/screenplay); Danny Aiello, Jeff Daniels, Teri Hatcher, Glenne Headly, Marsha Mason, Paul Mazursky, James Spader, Eric Stoltz, Charlize Theron, Greg Cruttwell, Peter Horton, Keith Carradine, Louise Fletcher, Austin Pendleton, Kathleen Luong, Michael Jai White, Cress Williams, Lawrence Tierney, Micole Mercurio, William Stanton, Ada Maris	
S E P T E M B E R	27	Curdled	Miramax Films / Rolling Thunder Pictures / A Band Apart / Tinderbox Films	Reb Braddock (director/screenplay); Angela Jones, William Baldwin, Bruce Ramsay, Mel Gorham, Lois Chiles, Daisy Fuentes, Barry Corbin, Lupita Ferrer, Kelly Preston, George Clooney, Quentin Tarantino, Sabrina Cowan, Carmen Lopez, Caridad Rivelo, Vivienne Sendaydiego, Sandra Thigpen, Charles J. Tucker	
S E P T E M B E R	27	Ed's Next Move	Weston Woods Studios / Gavin Brown Productions	Gavin Brown (director/screenplay); Matt Ross, Callie Thorne, Aunjanue Ellis, Joseph Fuqua, Will Arnett, Peter Jacobson, Kevin Seal, Kevin Carroll, Cathy Martin, Ramsey Faragallah, Rick Kaplan, R.E. Rodgers	
S E P T E M B E R	27	Entertaining Angels: The Dorothy Day Story	Paulist Pictures	Michael Ray Rhodes (director); John Wells (screenplay); Moira Kelly, Martin Sheen, Lenny Von Dohlen, Melinda Dillon, Paul Lieber, Heather Graham, Boyd Kestner, James Lancaster, Tracey Walter, Geoffrey Blake, Brian Keith, Thom Adcox-Hernandez, Allyce Beasley, Val Bettin, Marianne Muellerleile, Renée Estevez, Redmond Gleeson	
S E P T E M B E R	27	Extreme Measures	Columbia Pictures / Castle Rock Entertainment	Michael Apted (director); Tony Gilroy (screenplay); Hugh Grant, Gene Hackman, Sarah Jessica Parker, David Morse, Bill Nunn, Paul Guilfoyle, Debra Monk, André De Shields, J.K. Simmons, Nancy Beatty, Gerry Becker, Simon Reynolds, John Toles-Bey, Shaun Austin-Olsen, Peter Appel, Diana Zimmer, Gene Ruffini, Bill MacDonald	
S E P T E M B E R	27	Secrets & Lies	October Films	Mike Leigh (director/screenplay); Marianne Jean-Baptiste, Brenda Blethyn, Timothy Spall, Phyllis Logan, Claire Rushbrook, Elizabeth Berrington, Michele Austin, Lee Ross, Lesley Manville, Ron Cook, Emma Amos, Brian Bovell, Trevor Laird, Clare Perkins, Jonny Coyne, Peter Wight, Gary McDonald, Alison Steadman, Liz Smith, Sheila Kelley, Phil Davis, Anthony O'Donnell, Ruth Sheen, Mia Soteriou	

== October–December ==
Opening		Title	Production company	Cast and crew	Ref.
O C T O B E R	4	Bound	Gramercy Pictures / Spelling Films	Lilly Wachowski, Lana Wachowski (directors/screenplay); Gina Gershon, Jennifer Tilly, Joe Pantoliano, Christopher Meloni, Mary Mara, Susie Bright, Margaret Smith, Barry Kivel, John Ryan, Peter Spellos, Kevin Michael Richardson, Richard C. Sarafian, Ivan Kane, Gene Borkan	
O C T O B E R	4	D3: The Mighty Ducks	Walt Disney Pictures	Robert Lieberman (director); Steven Brill, Jim Burnstein (screenplay); Emilio Estevez, Jeffrey Nordling, Heidi Kling, Joss Ackland, Joshua Jackson, David Selby, Margot Finley, Elden Henson, Shaun Weiss, Vincent Larusso, Matt Doherty, Garette Ratliff Henson, Marguerite Moreau, Michael Cudlitz, Christopher Orr, Aaron Lohr, Colombe Jacobsen, Kenan Thompson, Mike Vitar, Ty O'Neal, Justin Wong, Scott Whyte, Benjamin Salisbury, Paul Kariya	
O C T O B E R	4	The Glimmer Man	Warner Bros. Pictures	John Gray (director); Kevin Brodbin (screenplay); Steven Seagal, Keenen Ivory Wayans, Bob Gunton, Brian Cox, John M. Jackson, Michelle Johnson, Stephen Tobolowsky, Ryan Cutrona, Richard Gant, Jesse Stock, Alexa Vega, Nikki Cox, Scott Nielson, Johnny Strong, Wendy Robie, Peter Jason	
O C T O B E R	4	Infinity	First Look Pictures	Matthew Broderick (director); Patricia Broderick (screenplay); Matthew Broderick, Patricia Arquette, Peter Riegert, Željko Ivanek, Dori Brenner, Peter Michael Goetz, Joyce Van Patten, James LeGros, Jeffrey Force, David Drew Gallagher, Raffi Di Blasio, Jack Lindine, Joshua Keaton, James Hong, Mary Pat Gleason, Horton Foote Jr., Mary Kay Wulf, Laurence Haddon, Erich Anderson, Matt Mulhern, John Patterson, Joshua Malina, Demetrius Navarro, Cosimo Sherman, Geoffrey Nauffts, David Barrera, Kirk Fox, Marianne Muellerleile, Michelle Feynman, Kristin Dattilo, Bill Bolender, Corbitt Smith	
O C T O B E R	4	That Thing You Do!	20th Century Fox	Tom Hanks (director/screenplay); Tom Everett Scott, Liv Tyler, Johnathon Schaech, Steve Zahn, Ethan Embry, Tom Hanks, Charlize Theron, Bill Cobbs, Giovanni Ribisi, Obba Babatunde, Alex Rocco, Chris Isaak, Larry Antonino, Holmes Osborne, Robert Torti, Chris Ellis, Kevin Pollak, Paul Feig, Clint Howard, Gedde Watanabe, Peter Scolari, Bryan Cranston, Marc McClure, Tracy Reiner, Barry Sobel, Jonathan Demme, Rita Wilson, Colin Hanks, Elizabeth Hanks	
O C T O B E R	9	The Proprietor	Warner Bros. Pictures	Ismail Merchant (director); Jean-Marie Besset, George Swift Trow (screenplay); Jeanne Moreau, Sean Young, Sam Waterston, Christopher Cazenove, Nell Carter, Jean-Pierre Aumont, Austin Pendleton, Charlotte de Turckheim, Pierre Vaneck, Marc Tissot, Josh Hamilton, Joanna Adler, James Naughton, J. Smith-Cameron, Michael Bergin, John Dalton, Jack Koenig, Hubert Saint-Macary, Guillemette Grobon, Alain Rimoux, Humbert Balsan, Donald Rosenfeld, Franck de la Personne, Henri Garcin, Carole Franck, Brigitte Catillon, Éric Ruf, Élodie Bouchez, Judith Rémy, Wade Childress, Thomas Tomazewski	
O C T O B E R	11	The Chamber	Universal Pictures / Imagine Entertainment	James Foley (director); William Goldman, Chris Reese (screenplay); Chris O'Donnell, Gene Hackman, Faye Dunaway, Lela Rochon, Robert Prosky, Raymond J. Barry, David Marshall Grant, Bo Jackson, Nicholas Pryor, Harve Presnell, Millie Perkins, Richard Bradford, Josef Sommer, Jane Kaczmarek, Thom Gossom Jr., Jack Conley	
O C T O B E R	11	Freeway	Republic Pictures / The Kushner-Locke Company / Illusion Entertainment Group	Matthew Bright (director/screenplay); Kiefer Sutherland, Reese Witherspoon, Wolfgang Bodison, Dan Hedaya, Amanda Plummer, Brooke Shields, Michael T. Weiss, Bokeem Woodbine, Guillermo Díaz, Brittany Murphy, Alanna Ubach, Susan Barnes, Conchata Ferrell, Tara Subkoff, Julie Araskog, Lorna Raver, Paul Perri, Robert Barnes, Kathleen Marshall, David Andriole, Monica Lacy, Leanna Creel, Louis Mustillo, Sydney Lassick	
O C T O B E R	11	The Ghost and the Darkness	Paramount Pictures / Constellation Films	Stephen Hopkins (director); William Goldman (screenplay); Michael Douglas, Val Kilmer, John Kani, Bernard Hill, Tom Wilkinson, Brian McCardie, Emily Mortimer, Om Puri, Henry Cele, Jack Devnarain, Alex Ferns, Giles Masters, Stephen Evans	
O C T O B E R	11	The Grass Harp	Fine Line Features	Charles Matthau (director); Stirling Silliphant (screenplay); Joe Don Baker, Nell Carter, Charles Durning, Edward Furlong, Piper Laurie, Jack Lemmon, Walter Matthau, Roddy McDowall, Sissy Spacek, Mary Steenburgen, Sean Patrick Flanery, Mia Kirshner, Scott Wilson, Bonnie Bartlett, Doris Roberts, Ray McKinnon	
O C T O B E R	11	The Long Kiss Goodnight	New Line Cinema	Renny Harlin (director); Shane Black (screenplay); Geena Davis, Samuel L. Jackson, Patrick Malahide, Craig Bierko, Brian Cox, David Morse, G.D. Spradlin, Tom Amandes, Yvonne Zima, Melina Kanakaredes, Alan North, Matt Clark, Joseph McKenna, Dan Warry-Smith, Rex Linn, Edwin Hodge, Gladys O'Connor, Frank Moore, Judah Katz, Marc Cohen, Chad Donella, Shawn Doyle, Larry King, Gerry Bamman, Ivar Brogger	
O C T O B E R	11	Looking for Richard	Fox Searchlight Pictures	Al Pacino (director/screenplay); William Shakespeare, Frederic Kimball (screenplay); Al Pacino, Alec Baldwin, Aidan Quinn, Winona Ryder, Kevin Spacey, Penelope Allen, Harris Yulin, Kevin Conway, Estelle Parsons, Julie Moret, Vanessa Redgrave, Kenneth Branagh, John Gielgud, Derek Jacobi, James Earl Jones, Kevin Kline	
O C T O B E R	11	Michael Collins	Geffen Pictures	Neil Jordan (director/screenplay); Liam Neeson, Aidan Quinn, Stephen Rea, Alan Rickman, Julia Roberts, Ian Hart, Brendan Gleeson, Sean McGinley, Gerard McSorley, Owen O'Neill, Charles Dance, Jonathan Rhys Meyers, Ian McElhinney, Stuart Graham, Gary Lydon	
O C T O B E R	11	Trees Lounge	LIVE Entertainment / Orion Pictures / Pioneer Entertainment	Steve Buscemi (director/screenplay); Steve Buscemi, Chloë Sevigny, Mark Boone Junior, Anthony LaPaglia, Elizabeth Bracco, Eszter Balint, Carol Kane, Daniel Baldwin, Mimi Rogers, Debi Mazar, Seymour Cassel, Samuel L. Jackson, Lawrence Gilliard Jr., Michael Imperioli, Kevin Corrigan, John Ventimiglia, Bianca Hunter, Charlie Newmark, Michael Buscemi	
O C T O B E R	13	If These Walls Could Talk	HBO NYC Productions / Moving Pictures	Nancy Savoca (director/screenplay); Cher (director); Susan Nanus, I. Marlene King, Earl W. Wallace, Pamela Wallace (screenplay); Demi Moore, Sissy Spacek, Cher, Xander Berkeley, Hedy Burress, Anne Heche, Jada Pinkett, Shirley Knight, Catherine Keener, Jason London, CCH Pounder, Joanna Gleason, Janna Michaels, Ian Bohen, Zack Eginton, Eileen Brennan, Lindsay Crouse, Craig T. Nelson, Matthew Lillard, Rita Wilson, Kevin Cooney, Robin Gammell, Aaron Lustig, Jack Kehler, Tim DeKay, Harris Yulin, Jordana Spiro, Diana Scarwid, Lorraine Toussaint, Sally Murphy, Rusty Schwimmer, Chris Ellis, Brendan Ford, Rob Camilletti, Robert Ray Wisdom	
O C T O B E R	16	Get on the Bus	Columbia Pictures / 40 Acres and a Mule Filmworks	Spike Lee (director); Reggie Rock Bythewood (screenplay); Richard Belzer, De'Aundre Bonds, Andre Braugher, Thomas Jefferson Byrd, Gabriel Casseus, Albert Hall, Hill Harper, Harry Lennix, Bernie Mac, Wendell Pierce, Roger Guenveur Smith, Isaiah Washington, Steve White, Ossie Davis, Charles S. Dutton, Kristen Wilson, Susan Batson, Paula Jai Parker, Gina Ravera, Joie Lee, Randy Quaid	
O C T O B E R	18	Jude	PolyGram Filmed Entertainment	Michael Winterbottom (director); Hossein Amini (screenplay); Christopher Eccleston, Kate Winslet, Liam Cunningham, Rachel Griffiths, June Whitfield, Berwick Kaler, David Tennant, Kerry Shale, Paul Copley, Paul Bown, Chantelle Swanson Neary	
O C T O B E R	18	Sleepers	Warner Bros. Pictures / PolyGram Filmed Entertainment / Baltimore Pictures / Propaganda Films	Barry Levinson (director/screenplay); Kevin Bacon, Robert De Niro, Dustin Hoffman, Jason Patric, Brad Pitt, Brad Renfro, Minnie Driver, Billy Crudup, Ron Eldard, Terry Kinney, Bruno Kirby, Vittorio Gassman, Joe Perrino, Geoffrey Wigdor, Jonathan Tucker, Eugene Byrd, Jeffrey Donovan, Gerry Becker, Pasquale Cajano, Robert W. Castle, Marco Greco, Saverio Guerra, Paul Herman, Chuck Low, Ruth Maleczech, Danny Mastrogiorgio, Peter McRobbie, Dash Mihok, James Pickens Jr., Wendell Pierce, Larry Romano, John Slattery, Mary Testa, Patrick Tull, Aida Turturro	
O C T O B E R	18	Swingers	Miramax Films	Doug Liman (director); Jon Favreau (screenplay); Jon Favreau, Vince Vaughn, Ron Livingston, Patrick Van Horn, Alex Désert, Heather Graham, Brooke Langton, Blake Lindsley, Stephanie Ittleson, Maddie Corman, Big Bad Voodoo Daddy, Ahmed Ahmed, Stephen Gaghan, Roger Kumble, Mike White, Deena Martin, Katherine Kendall, Rio Hackford, John Livingston	
O C T O B E R	18	To Gillian on Her 37th Birthday	Triumph Films / Rastar Productions	Michael Pressman (director); David E. Kelley (screenplay); Peter Gallagher, Michelle Pfeiffer, Claire Danes, Laurie Fortier, Wendy Crewson, Bruce Altman, Kathy Baker, Freddie Prinze Jr., Seth Green, Rachel Seidman-Lockamy	
O C T O B E R	20	North Star	Warner Bros. Pictures / Regency Enterprises	Nils Gaup (director); Sergio Donati (screenplay); James Caan, Christopher Lambert, Catherine McCormack, Burt Young, Morten Faldaas, Frank Salsedo, Sverre Anker Ousdal, Nicholas Hope, Frank Krog	
O C T O B E R	25	The Associate	Hollywood Pictures	Donald Petrie (director); Nick Thiel (screenplay); Whoopi Goldberg, Dianne Wiest, Eli Wallach, Tim Daly, Bebe Neuwirth, Austin Pendleton, Lainie Kazan, George N. Martin, Kenny Kerr, Lee Wilkof, Helen Hanft, George Morfogen, Željko Ivanek, Miles Chapin, Louis Turenne, William Hill, Colleen Camp Wilson, Brian Tarantina, Jerry Hardin, Johnny Miller, Donald J. Trump, Peter McRobbie, Daryl Edwards, Allison Janney, Larry Gilliard Jr., Vincent Laresca, Arthur French, Kathleen McClellan, John Rothman, Jonathan Freeman, Socorro Santiago, Bernie McInerney, Sally Jessy Raphael, Craig Braun, Boris McGiver, Dale Resteghini	
O C T O B E R	25	High School High	TriStar Pictures / Zucker Brothers Productions	Hart Bochner (director); David Zucker, Robert LoCash, Pat Proft (screenplay); Jon Lovitz, Tia Carrere, Louise Fletcher, Mekhi Phifer, Malinda Williams, Guillermo Díaz, John Neville, Brian Hooks, Natasha Gregson Wagner, Marco Rodriguez, Nicholas Worth, Eric Allan Kramer, Jeannie Pepper, Sonya Eddy, Saemi Nakamura, Baoan Coleman, John Ducey, Ricky Harris, Thom Barry, Shauna Robertson, Charlotte Zucker, Colleen Ann Fitzpatrick, Michael Ray Bower, Eric Lange, Lexie Bigham, Gil Espinoza	
O C T O B E R	25	Palookaville	The Samuel Goldwyn Company	Alan Taylor (director); David Epstein (screenplay); William Forsythe, Vincent Gallo, Adam Trese, Gareth Williams, Lisa Gay Hamilton, Kim Dickens, Suzanne Shepherd, Nicole Burdette, Robert LuPone, Sam Coppola, Frances McDormand, Douglas Seale, William Riker, Leonard Jackson, William Duell, Peter McRobbie, Nesbitt Blaisdell, Bridgit Ryan	
O C T O B E R	25	Sunchaser	Warner Bros. Pictures	Michael Cimino (director); Charles Leavitt (screenplay); Woody Harrelson, Jon Seda, Anne Bancroft, Alexandra Tydings, Matt Mulhern, Talisa Soto, Richard Bauer, Victor Aaron, Lawrence Pressman, Michael O'Neill, Harry Carey Jr., Carmen Dell'Orefice, Brooke Ashley, Andrea Roth, Bob Minor, Brett Harrelson, Andy Berman	
O C T O B E R	25	Thinner	Paramount Pictures / Spelling Films	Tom Holland (director/screenplay); Michael McDowell (screenplay); Robert John Burke, Joe Mantegna, Lucinda Jenney, Michael Constantine, Kari Wuhrer, Bethany Joy Lenz, Daniel von Bargen, John Horton, Irma St. Paule, Elizabeth Franz, Stephen King, Sam Freed, Randy Jurgensen, Josh Lucas	
O C T O B E R	25	Twelfth Night	Fine Line Features	Trevor Nunn (director/screenplay); Helena Bonham Carter, Richard E. Grant, Nigel Hawthorne, Ben Kingsley, Mel Smith, Imelda Staunton, Toby Stephens, Imogen Stubbs, Steven Mackintosh, Peter Gunn, Nicholas Farrell	
O C T O B E R	25	When We Were Kings	Gramercy Pictures / PolyGram Filmed Entertainment	Leon Gast (director); Muhammad Ali, George Foreman, James Brown, B.B. King, Mobutu Sese Seko, Norman Mailer, George Plimpton, Spike Lee, The Crusaders, The Spinners, Miriam Makeba, Thomas Hauser, Malik Bowens, Lloyd Price, Drew Bundini Brown, Odessa Clay, Howard Cosell, Joe Frazier, Stewart Levine, Sonny Liston, Angelo Dundee, Archie Moore, Ken Norton, Jersey Joe Walcott, Alan Pariser, Danny Rey, Dick Sadler, Zach Clayton, Lola Love	
N O V E M B E R	1	Bad Moon	Warner Bros. Pictures / Morgan Creek Productions	Eric Red (director/screenplay); Michael Paré, Mariel Hemingway, Mason Gamble, Ken Pogue	
N O V E M B E R	1	Dear God	Paramount Pictures / Rysher Entertainment	Garry Marshall (director); Warren Leight, Ed Kaplan (screenplay); Greg Kinnear, Laurie Metcalf, Maria Pitillo, Tim Conway, Héctor Elizondo, Jon Seda, Roscoe Lee Browne, Anna Maria Horsford, Kathleen Marshall, Donal Logue, Sam McMurray, Nancy Marchand, Larry Miller, Rue McClanahan, Jack Sheldon, Coolio, Toby Huss, Stephanie Niznik, John Pinette, Greg Lewis, Valerie Wildman, Timothy Stack, Bonnie Aarons, Steve Tisch, Jack Klugman, Ellen Cleghorne, Curtis Williams, Odette Yustman, Marcus Toji, Patrick Richwood, Jim Meskimen, Sean O'Bryan, Jeris Lee Poindexter, Dr. Joyce Brothers, Erin Moran, Elinor Donahue, Tony Danza, Christopher Darden, David Hasselhoff, Johnny Luckett, Garry Marshall, Cassandra Peterson	
N O V E M B E R	1	The Funeral	October Films	Abel Ferrara (director); Nicholas St. John (screenplay); Christopher Walken, Benicio del Toro, Vincent Gallo, Paul Hipp, Chris Penn, Isabella Rossellini, Annabella Sciorra, Gretchen Mol, John Ventimiglia, David Patrick Kelly, Frank John Hughes, Victor Argo, Robert Miano, Andrew Fiscella, Paul Perri	
N O V E M B E R	1	Larger Than Life	United Artists	Howard Franklin (director); Pen Densham, Garry Williams, Roy Blount Jr. (screenplay); Bill Murray, Janeane Garofalo, Matthew McConaughey, Jeremy Piven, Pat Hingle, Lois Smith, Linda Fiorentino, Keith David, Anita Gillette, Tracey Walter, Harve Presnell, Tai, Jerry Adler, Earl Billings, Roy Blount Jr., Margaret Smith, Jesse D. Goins, Dirk Blocker, Jimmy Hart	
N O V E M B E R	1	Mother Night	Fine Line Features	Keith Gordon (director); Robert B. Weide (screenplay); Nick Nolte, Sheryl Lee, Alan Arkin, Kirsten Dunst, Brawley Nolte, Arye Gross, Frankie Faison, Bernard Behrens, Gerard Parkes, Vlasta Vrana, Zach Grenier, Norman Rodway, John Goodman, Bill Corday, Bronwen Mantel, David Strathairn, Henry Gibson, Kurt Vonnegut	
N O V E M B E R	1	Romeo + Juliet	20th Century Fox	Baz Luhrmann (director/screenplay); Craig Pearce (screenplay); Leonardo DiCaprio, Claire Danes, Brian Dennehy, John Leguizamo, Vondie Curtis-Hall, Pete Postlethwaite, Paul Sorvino, Diane Venora, Miriam Margolyes, Paul Rudd, Jesse Bradford, Harold Perrineau, Dash Mihok, Christina Pickles, M. Emmet Walsh, Jamie Kennedy, Vincent Laresca, Zak Orth, Quindon Tarver, Harriet Sansom Harris, Michael Corbett, Ken Kirzinger, Des'ree, Carlos Martín Manzo Otálora	
N O V E M B E R	1	Unhook the Stars	Miramax Films	Nick Cassavetes (director/screenplay); Helen Caldwell (screenplay); Gena Rowlands, Marisa Tomei, Gerard Depardieu, Jake Lloyd, Moira Kelly, David Sherrill, David Thornton, Bridgette Wilson, David Rowlands, Bobby Cooper, Clint Howard, Jamie Bozian	
N O V E M B E R	2	Mistrial	HBO NYC Productions	Heywood Gould (director/screenplay); Bill Pullman, Robert Loggia, Jon Seda, Blair Underwood, Leo Burmester, Roma Maffia, James Rebhorn, Josef Sommer, Casey Siemaszko, Kate Burton, Peter MacNeill, Roberta Maxwell, Richard Chevolleau, Hugh Thompson, Christina Cox, Miriam Colón, Penny Crone, Tony Nappo, Michael Cumpsty, Burt Neuborne, Philip Akin	
N O V E M B E R	6	Set It Off	New Line Cinema	F. Gary Gray (director); Takashi Bufford, Kate Lanier (screenplay); Jada Pinkett, Queen Latifah, Vivica A. Fox, Kimberly Elise, John C. McGinley, Blair Underwood, Anna Maria Horsford, Ella Joyce, Charlie Robinson, Chaz Lamar Shepherd, Thomas Jefferson Byrd, Samuel Monroe Jr., Natalie Desselle, Dr. Dre, WC, Geoff Callan, Jeris Lee Poindexter, Tamara Clatterbuck, F. Gary Gray, George Marshall Ruge, Vincent Baum, Samantha McLachlan	
N O V E M B E R	8	Hype!	Cinépix Film Properties	Doug Pray (director); TAD, Mudhoney, Nirvana, Soundgarden, Coffin Break, The Gits, Love Battery, Flop, Melvins, Some Velvet Sidewalk, Mono Men, Supersuckers, Zipgun, Seaweed, Pearl Jam, 7 Year Bitch, Hovercraft, Gas Huffer, Fastbacks, Susan Silver, Jack Endino, Steve Fisk, Charles Peterson	
N O V E M B E R	8	Mad Dog Time	United Artists	Larry Bishop (director/screenplay); Ellen Barkin, Gabriel Byrne, Richard Dreyfuss, Jeff Goldblum, Diane Lane, Gregory Hines, Kyle MacLachlan, Burt Reynolds, Larry Bishop, Henry Silva, Michael J. Pollard, Christopher Jones, Billy Idol, Angie Everhart, Billy Drago, Paul Anka, Rob Reiner, Joey Bishop, Richard Pryor, Frank Licari	
N O V E M B E R	8	Ransom	Touchstone Pictures / Imagine Entertainment	Ron Howard (director); Richard Price, Alexander Ignon (screenplay); Mel Gibson, Rene Russo, Gary Sinise, Delroy Lindo, Lili Taylor, Liev Schreiber, Brawley Nolte, Donnie Wahlberg, Evan Handler, Michael Gaston, Paul Guilfoyle, José Zúñiga, Dan Hedaya, John Ortiz, Mike Hodge, A.J. Benza, Henry Kingi Jr., Donna Hanover, Rosanna Scotto, Tony Potts, Todd Hallowell, David Vadim, Richard Price, Craig Castaldo, J.J. Chaback, Lori Tan Chinn	
N O V E M B E R	12	Buenos Aires Vice Versa	Staccato Films / Agresti Films	Ramiro Civita (director); Alejandro Agresti (screenplay); Vera Fogwill, Nicolás Pauls, Fernán Mirás, Mirta Busnelli, Carlos Roffé, Mario Paolucci, Laura Melillo, Harry Havilio, Nazareno Casero, Carlos Galettini, Floria Bloise, Inés Molina	
N O V E M B E R	13	Breaking the Waves	October Films	Lars von Trier (director/screenplay); Peter Asmussen (screenplay); Emily Watson, Stellan Skarsgård, Katrin Cartlidge, Jean-Marc Barr, Udo Kier, Adrian Rawlins, Jonathan Hackett, Sandra Voe, Mikkel Gaup, Roef Ragas, Phil McCall, Robert Robertson	
N O V E M B E R	15	The English Patient	Miramax Films	Anthony Minghella (director/screenplay); Ralph Fiennes, Juliette Binoche, Colin Firth, Kristin Scott Thomas, Willem Dafoe, Naveen Andrews, Julian Wadham, Jurgen Prochnow, Kevin Whately, Clive Merrison, Nino Castelnuovo, Hichem Rostom, Peter Ruhring, Geordie Johnson, Torri Higginson, Liisa Repo-Martell, Raymond Coulthard, Philip Whitchurch, Lee Ross	
N O V E M B E R	15	The Mirror Has Two Faces	TriStar Pictures / Phoenix Pictures	Barbra Streisand (director); Richard LaGravenese (screenplay); Barbra Streisand, Jeff Bridges, Lauren Bacall, George Segal, Mimi Rogers, Pierce Brosnan, Brenda Vaccaro, Austin Pendleton, Elle Macpherson, Leslie Stefanson, Taina Elg, Amber Smith, Cindy Guyer, Andrew Parks, Laura Bailey, Mike Hodge, Ben Weber, Adam LeFevre, Jennifer Gareis, Eli Roth	
N O V E M B E R	15	Space Jam	Warner Bros. Pictures	Joe Pytka (director); Leo Benvenuti, Steve Rudnick, Timothy Harris, Herschel Weingrod (screenplay); Michael Jordan, Wayne Knight, Theresa Randle, Danny DeVito, Bill Murray, Larry Bird, Charles Barkley, Shawn Bradley, Patrick Ewing, Larry Johnson, Muggsy Bogues, Thom Barry, Penny Bae Bridges, Brandon Hammond, Danny Ainge, Steve Kerr, Alonzo Mourning, Horace Grant, A.C. Green, Charles Oakley, Luc Longley, Cedric Ceballos, Derek Harper, Vlade Divac, Brian Shaw, Jeff Malone, Bill Wennington, Anthony Miller, Sharone Wright, Scottie Pippen, Del Harris, Paul Westphal, Ahmad Rashad, Jim Rome, Patricia Heaton, Dan Castellaneta, Kelly Vint Castro, William G. Schilling, Albert Hague, Andre Rosey Brown, Brad William Henke, Connie Ray, John Roselius, Charles Hallahan, Jim Wise, Billy West, Dee Bradley Baker, Bob Bergen, Bill Farmer, Maurice LaMarche, June Foray, Kath Soucie, Frank Welker, Joey Camen, Catherine Reitman, Dorian Harewood, T.K. Carter, Jocelyn Blue, M. Darnell Suttles, Charity James, Steve Kehela, June Melby, Colleen Wainwright, Manner Washington, Eric Gordon	
N O V E M B E R	17	Titanic	CBS / The Konisgberg/Sanitsky Company / American Zoetrope / Hallmark Entertainment	Robert Lieberman (director); Ross LaManna, Joyce Eliason (screenplay); Peter Gallagher, George C. Scott, Catherine Zeta-Jones, Eva Marie Saint, Tim Curry, Roger Rees, Harley Jane Kozak, Marilu Henner, Mike Doyle, Sonsee Ahray, Felicity Waterman, Malcolm Stewart, Kevin McNulty, Kavan Smith, Terence Kelly, Scott Hylands, Janne Mortil, Tamsin Kelsey, Eric Keenleyside, Katharine Isabelle, Kevin Conway, Barry Pepper, Matt Hill, Matthew Walker, Chris Humphreys, Molly Parker, Hagan Beggs, Brent Stait, Lachlan Murdoch, Robin Driscoll, Devon Hoholuk, Crystal Verge, Bernard Cuffling, Don MacKay, Stephen Dimopoulos, Gerard Plunkett, Aaron Pearl, Byron Lucas, Ron Halder, Eric Schneider, Janie Woods-Morris, Peter Haworth, Martin Evans, Kim Kondrashoff	
N O V E M B E R	20	The War at Home	Touchstone Pictures	Emilio Estevez (director); James Duff (screenplay); Kathy Bates, Martin Sheen, Kimberly Williams, Emilio Estevez, Corin Nemec, Carla Gugino, Ann Hearn, Lane Smith	
N O V E M B E R	22	Jingle All the Way	20th Century Fox / Fox 2000 Pictures / 1492 Pictures	Brian Levant (director); Randy Kornfield (screenplay); Arnold Schwarzenegger, Sinbad, Phil Hartman, Rita Wilson, Robert Conrad, Jake Lloyd, James Belushi, Martin Mull, Laraine Newman, Justin Chapman, Harvey Korman, Richard Moll, Daniel Riordan, Lewis Dauber, Chris Parnell, Marcus Toji, Mo Collins, John Rothman, Danny Woodburn, Paul Wight, Alan Blumenfeld, Nick LaTour, Phil Morris, Marianne Muellerleile, Amy Pietz, Judy Sladky, Steve Van Wormer, Curtis Armstrong, Jim Meskimen, Spencer Klein, Yeardley Smith, Verne Troyer, E.J. De La Pena, Jeff Deist, Nada Despotovich, Patrick Richwood, Kate McGregor-Stewart, Bruce Bohne, Peter Breitmayer, Danny Pritchett	
N O V E M B E R	22	Ridicule	Miramax Films	Patrice Leconte (director); Rémi Waterhouse, Michel Fessler, Eric Vicaut (screenplay); Charles Berling, Jean Rochefort, Fanny Ardant, Judith Godrèche, Bernard Giraudeau, Bernard Dhéran, Jacques Mathou, Urbain Cancelier, Albert Delpy, Carlo Brandt, Bruno Zanardi, Marie Pillet	
N O V E M B E R	22	Shine	Fine Line Features	Scott Hicks (director/screenplay); Geoffrey Rush, Lynn Redgrave, Armin Mueller-Stahl, Noah Taylor, John Gielgud, Googie Withers, Justin Braine, Sonia Todd, Nicholas Bell, Chris Haywood, Alex Rafalowicz, Rebecca Gooden, Marta Kaczmarek, John Cousins, Randall Berger, David King, Robert Hands, Marc Warren, Neil Thomson, Joey Kennedy, Beverley Dunn, Ella Scott Lynch	
N O V E M B E R	22	Star Trek: First Contact	Paramount Pictures	Jonathan Frakes (director); Brannon Braga, Ronald D. Moore (screenplay); Patrick Stewart, Jonathan Frakes, Brent Spiner, LeVar Burton, Michael Dorn, Gates McFadden, Marina Sirtis, Alfre Woodard, James Cromwell, Alice Krige, Michael Horton, Neal McDonough, Marnie McPhail, Robert Picardo, Dwight Schultz, Adam Scott, Eric Steinberg, Patti Yasutake, Majel Barrett, Don Stark, Cully Fredricksen, Dan Woren, Ethan Phillips	
N O V E M B E R	23	Rebound: The Legend of Earl "The Goat" Manigault	HBO Pictures	Eriq La Salle (director); Alan Swyer, Larry Golin (screenplay); Don Cheadle, James Earl Jones, Michael Beach, Clarence Williams III, Eriq La Salle, Forest Whitaker, Ronny Cox, Loretta Devine, Glynn Turman, Monica Calhoun, Colin Cheadle, Michael Ralph, Daryl Mitchell, Nicole Ari Parker, Tamara Tunie, Kareem Abdul-Jabbar, Chick Hearn, Cress Williams, Wren T. Brown, Juan Chioran, Merwin Mondesir, Keith Robinson, Nigel Miguel, Kevin Garnett, Mitchell Butler, Gary Maloncon	
N O V E M B E R	24	In Cold Blood	CBS / RHI Entertainment / Pacific Motion Pictures	Jonathan Kaplan (director); Benedict Fitzgerald (screenplay); Anthony Edwards, Eric Roberts, Sam Neill, Leo Rossi, Louise Latham, Gwen Verdon, Bethel Leslie, L.Q. Jones, Gillian Barber, Kevin Tighe, Don S. Davis, Troy Evans, Brad Greenquist, Tom McBeath, Stella Stevens, Ryan Reynolds, Emily Perkins, Campbell Lane, Susan Hogan, Harry Northup, Frank C. Turner, Stephanie Mills, Jesse Lipscombe, Rhys Williams, Margot Finley, Robbie Bowen, Lindsey Campbell, Greg Lawson, Matthew Lerigny, Mark Herring, Liese McDonald, Brenda Shuttleworth, Valerie Planche, Veronica Sztopa, Renae Morriseau	
N O V E M B E R	27	101 Dalmatians	Walt Disney Pictures / Great Oaks Entertainment	Stephen Herek (director); John Hughes (screenplay); Glenn Close, Jeff Daniels, Joely Richardson, Joan Plowright, Hugh Laurie, Mark Williams, John Shrapnel, Tim McInnerny, Hugh Fraser, Zohren Weiss, Mark Haddigan, Hilda Braid, Margery Mason, John Benfield, Bill Stewart, Brian Capron, Frank Welker, Ian Abercrombie, Rodger Bumpass, Jennifer Darling, Paul Eiding, Sherry Lynn, Lynne Marta, Phil Proctor, Jan Rabson, Marcelo Tubert, Harry Fielder, Arthur Mullard, Mickie T. McGowan, Julian Barnes, Ken Danziger, Jon Rashad Kamal, Rosemary Lord, Diz White	
N O V E M B E R	27	The Crucible	20th Century Fox	Nicholas Hytner (director); Arthur Miller (screenplay); Daniel Day-Lewis, Winona Ryder, Paul Scofield, Joan Allen, Bruce Davison, Rob Campbell, Jeffrey Jones, Peter Vaughan, Karron Graves, Charlayne Woodard, Kali Rocha, Rachael Bella, Frances Conroy, Ashley Peldon, Elizabeth Lawrence, Tom McDermott, George Gaynes, Mary Pat Gleason, Robert Breuler, Michael Gaston, Ruth Maleczech, William Preston	
N O V E M B E R	27	Sling Blade	Miramax Films	Billy Bob Thornton (director/screenplay); Billy Bob Thornton, Dwight Yoakam, J. T. Walsh, John Ritter, Lucas Black, Natalie Canerday, James Hampton, Robert Duvall, Jim Jarmusch, Vic Chesnutt, Brent Briscoe, Mickey Jones, Col. Bruce Hampton	
N O V E M B E R	29	Adrenalin: Fear the Rush	Dimension Films / Largo Entertainment	Albert Pyun (director); Christopher Lambert, Natasha Henstridge, Norbert Weisser	
D E C E M B E R	5	How the Toys Saved Christmas	Alpha-Film / Lanterna Magica / Monipoly Productions	Gianni Rodari (director); Enzo D'Alò (screenplay); Dario Fo, Lella Costa, Vittorio Amandola, Pino Ammendola, Vittorio Battarra, Alida Milana, Monica Bertolotti, Rodolfo Bianchi, Fabio Boccanera, Marco Bolognesi, Rino Bolognesi, Giorgio Borghetti, Marco Bresciani, George Castiglia, Daniela Cavallini, Roberto Certomà, Laura Cosenza, Alessio De Filippis, Stefano De Filippis, Oliviero Dinelli, Pino Ferrara, Luigi Ferraro, Michele Kalamera, Christian Iansante, Ilaria Latini, Sergio Luzi, Neri Marcorè, Roberto Pedicini, Elena Perino, Davide Perino, Francesco Pezzulli, Carlo Reali, Nello Riviè, Renzo Stacchi, Roberto Stocchi, Gaetano Varcasia	
D E C E M B E R	6	Daylight	Universal Pictures	Rob Cohen (director); Leslie Bohem (screenplay); Sylvester Stallone, Amy Brenneman, Viggo Mortensen, Dan Hedaya, Jay O. Sanders, Karen Young, Claire Bloom, Barry Newman, Stan Shaw, Vanessa Bell Calloway, Renoly Santiago, Colin Fox, Danielle Harris, Trina McGee-Davis, Marcello Thedford, Sage Stallone, Jo Anderson, Mark Rolston, Rosemary Forsyth, Luoyong Wang, Lee Oakes, Sakina Jaffrey, Nestor Serrano, Isis Mussenden, Rob Cohen	
D E C E M B E R	6	Everyone Says I Love You	Miramax Films	Woody Allen (director/screenplay); Alan Alda, Woody Allen, Drew Barrymore, Lukas Haas, Goldie Hawn, Gaby Hoffmann, Natasha Lyonne, Edward Norton, Natalie Portman, Julia Roberts, Tim Roth, David Ogden Stiers, Itzhak Perlman, Edward Hibbert, Patrick Cranshaw, Billy Crudup, Robert Knepper, Scotty Bloch, Isiah Whitlock, Kevin Hagan, Navah Perlman, Waltrudis Buck, Christy Carlson Romano, Arlene Martell	
D E C E M B E R	13	Citizen Ruth	Miramax Films	Alexander Payne (director/screenplay); Jim Taylor (screenplay); Laura Dern, Swoosie Kurtz, Kurtwood Smith, Mary Kay Place, Kelly Preston, M. C. Gainey, Kenneth Mars, David Graf, Kathleen Noone, Tippi Hedren, Burt Reynolds, Alicia Witt, Diane Ladd, Caveh Zahedi	
D E C E M B E R	13	Jerry Maguire	TriStar Pictures	Cameron Crowe (director/screenplay); Tom Cruise, Cuba Gooding Jr., Renée Zellweger, Kelly Preston, Jerry O'Connell, Jay Mohr, Regina King, Bonnie Hunt, Jonathan Lipnicki, Lisa Stahl Sullivan, Todd Louiso, Jeremy Suarez, Aries Spears, Toby Huss, Eric Stoltz, Beau Bridges, Glenn Frey, Drake Bell, Jared Jussim, Jeffrey Lurie, Mel Kiper Jr., Drew Bledsoe, Troy Aikman, Warren Moon, Katarina Witt, Barry Switzer, Wayne Fontes, Tim McDonald, Johnnie Morton, Rick Mirer, Rob Moore, Ki-Jana Carter, Herman Moore, Art Monk, Kerry Collins, Dean Biasucci, Al Michaels, Frank Gifford, Roy Firestone, Mike Tirico, Dan Dierdorf, Brent Barry, Lucy Liu, Samantha Smith, Ivana Milicevic, Alison Armitage, Emily Procter, Stacey Williams, Reagan Gomez-Preston, Jerry Cantrell, Jim Irsay, Jann Wenner	
D E C E M B E R	13	Mars Attacks!	Warner Bros. Pictures	Tim Burton (director); Jonathan Gems (screenplay); Jack Nicholson, Glenn Close, Annette Bening, Pierce Brosnan, Danny DeVito, Martin Short, Sarah Jessica Parker, Michael J. Fox, Rod Steiger, Tom Jones, Lukas Haas, Natalie Portman, Jim Brown, Lisa Marie, Sylvia Sidney, Christina Applegate, Joe Don Baker, Pam Grier, Paul Winfield, Jack Black, Brian Haley, O-Lan Jones, Jerzy Skolimowski, Ray J, Brandon Hammond, Barbet Schroeder, Tommy Bush, Joseph Maher, Willie Garson, John Roselius, Michael Reilly Burke, Valerie Wildman, Rebecca Broussard, Steve Valentine, Enrique Castillo, John Finnegan, Gregg Daniel, J. Kenneth Campbell, Rance Howard, Frank Welker, George Cheung, Cliff Curtis, Roger L. Jackson	
D E C E M B E R	13	The Preacher's Wife	Touchstone Pictures / The Samuel Goldwyn Company	Penny Marshall (director); Robert E. Sherwood, Nat Mauldin, Allan Scott (screenplay); Denzel Washington, Whitney Houston, Courtney B. Vance, Gregory Hines, Jenifer Lewis, Loretta Devine, Justin Pierre Edmund, Lionel Richie, Paul Bates, Lex Monson, Darvel Davis Jr., William James Stiggers Jr., Marcella Lowery, Cissy Houston	
D E C E M B E R	14	The Cherokee Kid	HBO Pictures / Spring Creek Productions / Afros & Bellbottoms Productions	Paris Barclay (director); Tim Kazurinsky, Denise DeClue (screenplay); Sinbad, James Coburn, Gregory Hines, A Martinez, Ernie Hudson, Burt Reynolds, Dawnn Lewis, Vanessa Bell Calloway, Mark Pellegrino, Hal Williams, Obba Babatundé, Lorraine Toussaint, Paris Barclay, W. Earl Brown, Roy Fegan, Troy Garity, Walton Goggins, Alaina Reed Hall, Herb Jeffries, Michael Kagan, Tim Kazurinsky, Nancy Lenehan, Bob Minor, Christopher Liam Moore, Arnetia Walker, Spice Williams, Hattie Winston, Reginald T. Dorsey, Carlos Cervantes, Stuart Proud Eagle Grant, Martin Grey, Edward B. Hicks, James Lashly, Jim Lewis Jr., June Kyoto Lu, Angela Means, Ivory Ocean, Jeff O'Haco, Roxanne Reese, Jim Cody Williams	
D E C E M B E R	15	Bastard Out of Carolina	Showtime Networks	Anjelica Huston (director); Anne Meredith (screenplay); Jennifer Jason Leigh, Ron Eldard, Glenne Headly, Lyle Lovett, Jena Malone, Dermot Mulroney, Christina Ricci, Michael Rooker, Diana Scarwid, Susan Traylor, Grace Zabriskie, Pat Hingle, Laura Dern, Nelson George, Sonny Shroyer, Jerry Winsett, J.C. Quinn, Kelsey Elizabeth Boulware, Lindley Mayer, Richard Todd Sullivan, Jamison Stewart, Timothy Stewart, Derin Altay, Sue Ellen Yates	
D E C E M B E R	18	Marvin's Room	Miramax Films	Jerry Zaks (director); Scott McPherson (screenplay); Meryl Streep, Leonardo DiCaprio, Diane Keaton, Robert De Niro, Hume Cronyn, Gwen Verdon, Hal Scardino, Dan Hedaya, Margo Martindale, Cynthia Nixon, Kelly Ripa, Bitty Schram, Helen Stenborg, Olga Merediz	
D E C E M B E R	18	In Love and War	New Line Cinema	Richard Attenborough (director/producer); Allan Scott (screenplay); Clancy Sigal (writer); Chris O'Donnell, Sandra Bullock, Mackenzie Astin, Emilio Bonucci, Alan Bennett, Ingrid Lacey, Vincenzo Nicoli	
D E C E M B E R	20	Beavis and Butt-Head Do America	Paramount Pictures / Geffen Pictures / MTV Productions	Mike Judge (director/screenplay); Yvette Kaplan (director); Joe Stillman (screenplay); Mike Judge, Demi Moore, Bruce Willis, Robert Stack, Cloris Leachman, Pamela Blair, Eric Bogosian, John Doman, Jim Flaherty, Toby Huss, Sam Johnson, Richard Linklater, Karen Phillips, Greg Kinnear, David Letterman, Harsh Nayyar, Jacqueline Barba, Kristofor Brown, Tony Darling, Francis DuMaurier, Tim Guinee, Earl Hofert, Rosemary McNamara, Dale Reeves, Mike Ruschak, Gail Thomas	
D E C E M B E R	20	Ghosts of Mississippi	Columbia Pictures / Castle Rock Entertainment	Rob Reiner (director); Lewis Colick (screenplay); Alec Baldwin, Whoopi Goldberg, James Woods, Virginia Madsen, Susanna Thompson, Craig T. Nelson, Lucas Black, Alexa Vega, William H. Macy, Diane Ladd, Margo Martindale, Yolanda King, Jerry Levine, Ramon Bieri, Michael O'Keefe, Bill Smitrovich, Terry O'Quinn, Rex Linn, James Pickens Jr., Richard Riehle, Bonnie Bartlett, Brock Peters, Wayne Rogers, Bill Cobbs, Jerry Hardin, Bill Henderson, Rae'Ven Larrymore Kelly, Finn Carter, Andy Romano, Richard Stahl, Jordan Lund, Diana Bellamy, Rance Howard, Thomas Kopache, Marilyn Lovell, Leigh French, Spencer Garrett, Thom Barry, J.J. Chaback, Stokely Carmichael, Medgar Evers, John F. Kennedy, Martin Luther King, Joe Louis, Malcolm X, Jesse Owens, Jackie Robinson, Joseph Tello, Darrell Evers, James Van Evers, G. Ja'ron Henderson, Curtis Tyler Haynes, William Howard, Jim Harley, David Carpenter, Sarah Hunley, Ed Bryson, Maggie Wade, Keenan K. Evers, Nicole Evers-Everette, Dijon S. Williams	
D E C E M B E R	20	My Fellow Americans	Warner Bros. Pictures / Peters Entertainment	Peter Segal (director); Jack Kaplan, Richard Chapman, Peter Tolan (screenplay); Jack Lemmon, James Garner, Dan Aykroyd, John Heard, Wilford Brimley, Lauren Bacall, Sela Ward, Everett McGill, Bradley Whitford, James Rebhorn, Esther Rolle, Conchata Ferrell, Jack Kehler, Connie Ray, Tom Everett, Mark Lowenthal, Jeff Yagher, Edwin Newman, Gunnar Peterson, Jack Garner, Paul Feig, Cathy Ladman, Tom Wright, Dana Gould, Steve Carlisle, Michael Peña, Ann Cusack, Jean Speegle Howard, Dorothy Lucey, James Bissell, Peter Segal, Marg Helgenberger	
D E C E M B E R	20	One Fine Day	20th Century Fox / Fox 2000 Pictures	Michael Hoffman (director); Terrel Seltzer, Ellen Simon (screenplay); Michelle Pfeiffer, George Clooney, Alex D. Linz, Mae Whitman, Charles Durning, Jon Robin Baitz, Ellen Greene, Joe Grifasi, Pete Hamill, Anna Maria Horsford, Gregory Jbara, Sheila Kelley, Barry Kivel, Robert Klein, George N. Martin, Michael Massee, Amanda Peet, Holland Taylor, Rachel York, Marianne Muellerleile, Sidney Armus	
D E C E M B E R	20	Scream	Dimension Films	Wes Craven (director); Kevin Williamson (screenplay); David Arquette, Neve Campbell, Courteney Cox, Matthew Lillard, Rose McGowan, Skeet Ulrich, Jamie Kennedy, Drew Barrymore, Joseph Whipp, W. Earl Brown, Liev Schreiber, Henry Winkler, Kevin Patrick Walls, Lawrence Hecht, C. W. Morgan, Frances Lee McCain, Lisa Canning, Roger L. Jackson, Linda Blair, Wes Craven	
D E C E M B E R	20	The Whole Wide World	Sony Pictures Classics	Dan Ireland (director); Novalyne Price Ellis, Michael Scott Myers (screenplay); Vincent D'Onofrio, Renee Zellweger, Ann Wedgeworth, Harve Presnell, Benjamin Mouton, Libby Villari, Michael Corbett, Helen Cates	
D E C E M B E R	24	The Portrait of a Lady	Gramercy Pictures	Jane Campion (director); Laura Jones (screenplay); Nicole Kidman, John Malkovich, Barbara Hershey, Mary-Louise Parker, Martin Donovan, Shelley Winters, John Gielgud, Shelley Duvall, Richard E. Grant, Viggo Mortensen, Christian Bale, Valentina Cervi, Roger Ashton-Griffiths	
D E C E M B E R	25	The Evening Star	Paramount Pictures / Rysher Entertainment	Robert Harling (director/screenplay); Larry McMurtry (screenplay); Shirley MacLaine, Bill Paxton, Juliette Lewis, Miranda Richardson, Ben Johnson, Scott Wolf, George Newbern, Marion Ross, Mackenzie Astin, Donald Moffat, Jack Nicholson, China Kantner, Jennifer Grant, Jake Langerud	
D E C E M B E R	25	Evita	Hollywood Pictures / Cinergi Pictures	Alan Parker (director/screenplay); Oliver Stone (screenplay); Madonna, Antonio Banderas, Jonathan Pryce, Jimmy Nail, Victoria Sus, Julian Littman, Olga Merediz, Laura Pallas, Julia Worsley, Peter Polycarpou, Gary Brooker, Andrea Corr, Alan Parker, Peter Hughes	
D E C E M B E R	25	Hamlet	Columbia Pictures / Castle Rock Entertainment	Kenneth Branagh (director/screenplay); Kenneth Branagh, Julie Christie, Billy Crystal, Gerard Depardieu, Charlton Heston, Derek Jacobi, Jack Lemmon, Rufus Sewell, Robin Williams, Kate Winslet, Timothy Spall, Rosemary Harris, Richard Attenborough, John Gielgud, Judi Dench, Reece Dinsdale, Richard Briers, Nicholas Farrell, Michael Maloney, Ian McElhinney, Ray Fearon, Brian Blessed, Simon Russell Beale, Don Warrington, Ravil Isyanov, John Mills, Ken Dodd, John Spencer-Churchill, 11th Duke of Marlborough	
D E C E M B E R	25	I'm Not Rappaport	Universal Pictures / Gramercy Pictures	Herb Gardner (director/screenplay); Walter Matthau, Ossie Davis, Amy Irving, Craig T. Nelson, Martha Plimpton, Boyd Gaines, Guillermo Díaz, Elina Löwensohn, Ron Rifkin, Marin Hinkle, Nancy Giles, Ranjit Chowdhry, Irwin Corey, Mina Bern, Steve Ryan, William Preston, Becky Ann Baker, Arthur Anderson, Michael Angarano, Adam Lamberg, Josh Pais, Vincent Laresca, Elvis Nolasco, Bobby Cannavale, Peter Friedman, Heather Goldenhersh, Edoardo Ballerini	
D E C E M B E R	25	Michael	New Line Cinema	Nora Ephron (director/screenplay); Delia Ephron, Peter Dexter (screenplay); John Travolta, Andie MacDowell, William Hurt, Bob Hoskins, Robert Pastorelli, Jean Stapleton, Teri Garr, Wallace Langham, Joey Lauren Adams, Richard Schiff, Carla Gugino, Tom Hodges, Sparky	
D E C E M B E R	25	Mother	Paramount Pictures	Albert Brooks (director/screenplay); Monica Johnson (screenplay); Albert Brooks, Debbie Reynolds, Rob Morrow, Isabel Glasser, Paul Collins, John C. McGinley, Vanessa A. Williams, Lisa Kudrow, Anne Haney, Peter White, Matt Nolan, Kimiko Gelman, Rosalind Allen, Spencer Klein, Harry Hutchinson, Laura Weeks, Danielle Quinn, Billye Ree Wallace, James Gleason, Ernie Brown, Richard Assad, Joey Naber	
D E C E M B E R	25	The People vs. Larry Flynt	Columbia Pictures / Phoenix Pictures	Miloš Forman (director); Scott Alexander, Larry Karaszewski (screenplay); Woody Harrelson, Courtney Love, Edward Norton, Richard Paul, James Cromwell, Donna Hanover, Crispin Glover, Vincent Schiavelli, Brett Harrelson, Miles Chapin, James Carville, Burt Neuborne, Jan Triska, Norm Macdonald, Larry Flynt	
D E C E M B E R	25	Some Mother's Son	Columbia Pictures / Castle Rock Entertainment	Terry George (director/screenplay); Jim Sheridan (screenplay); Helen Mirren, Fionnula Flanagan, Aidan Gillen, David O'Hara, John Lynch, Tom Hollander, Tim Woodward, Ciaran Hinds, Geraldine O'Rawe, Gerard McSorley, Dan Gordon, Ciaran Fitzgerald, Robert Lang, Grainne Delany, Stephen Hogan	

== See also ==
- List of 1996 box office number-one films in the United States
- 1996 in the United States
