= List of American films of 1995 =

This is a list of American films released in 1995.

== Box office ==
The highest-grossing American films released in 1995, by domestic box office gross revenue, are as follows:

Highest-grossing films of 1995
Rank	Title	Distributor	Domestic gross
1	Toy Story	Disney	$191,796,233
2	Batman Forever	Warner Bros.	$184,031,112
3	Apollo 13	Universal Pictures	$172,071,312
4	Pocahontas	Disney	$141,579,773
5	Ace Ventura: When Nature Calls	Warner Bros.	$108,385,533
6	GoldenEye	MGM	$106,429,941
7	Jumanji	Sony Pictures	$100,475,249
8	Casper	Universal Pictures	$100,439,549
9	Seven	New Line Cinema	$100,125,643
10	Die Hard with a Vengeance	20th Century Fox	$100,012,499

== January–March ==
Opening		Title	Production company	Cast and crew	Ref.
J A N U A R Y	6	Houseguest	Hollywood Pictures / Caravan Pictures	Randall Miller (director); Michael J. Di Gaetano, Lawrence Gay (screenplay); Sinbad, Phil Hartman, Kim Greist, Kim Murphy, Chauncey Leopardi, Talia Seider, Paul Ben-Victor, Tony Longo, Jeffrey Jones, Stan Shaw, Ron Glass, Kevin Jordan, Mason Adams, Patricia Fraser, Don Brockett, Kevin West, Ron Newell, Susan Chapek, Kirk Baily, Valerie Long, Wynonna Smith	
J A N U A R Y	6	Safe Passage	New Line Cinema	Robert Allan Ackerman (director); Deena Goldstone (screenplay); Susan Sarandon, Nick Stahl, Sam Shepard, Marcia Gay Harden, Robert Sean Leonard, Sean Astin, Matt Keeslar, Jesse Lee, Jordan Clarke, Jeffrey DeMunn, Philip Bosco, Jason London, Rutanya Alda, Joe Lisi, Bill Boggs, Benjamin Preston, Marvin Scott, Christopher Wynkoop	
J A N U A R Y	11	Higher Learning	Columbia Pictures	John Singleton (director/screenplay); Omar Epps, Kristy Swanson, Ice Cube, Jennifer Connelly, Laurence Fishburne, Cole Hauser, Michael Rapaport, Tyra Banks, Regina King, Jason Wiles, Busta Rhymes, Bradford English, Jay R. Ferguson, Andrew Bryniarski, Trevor St. John, Talbert Morton, Adam Goldberg, Bridgette Wilson, Kari Wuhrer, Randall Batinkoff, Dedrick D. Gobert, Morris Chestnut, Eve's Plum	
J A N U A R Y	13	Far from Home: The Adventures of Yellow Dog	20th Century Fox	Phillip Borsos (director/screenplay); Jesse Bradford, Bruce Davison, Mimi Rogers, Tom Bower	
J A N U A R Y	13	Ladybird, Ladybird	The Samuel Goldwyn Company	Ken Loach (director); Rona Munro (screenplay); Crissy Rock, Vladimir Vega, Sandie Lavelle, Mauricio Venegas, Ray Winstone, Claire Perkins, Jason Stracey, Luke Brown, Lily Farrell, Scottie Moore, Linda Ross, Rosemary Frankau, Yvonne Riley	
J A N U A R Y	13	Tales from the Crypt presents Demon Knight	Universal Pictures	Ernest R. Dickerson (director); Mark Bishop, Ethan Reiff, Cyrus Voris (screenplay); Billy Zane, William Sadler, Jada Pinkett Smith, Thomas Haden Church, C.C.H. Pounder, John Kassir, Brenda Bakke, Dick Miller, Gary Farmer, Ryan O'Donohue, Charles Fleischer, John Schuck, Sherrie Rose, Chasey Lain, Traci Bingham, Mark David Kennerly, Brock Winkless, John Larroquette	
J A N U A R Y	20	Murder in the First	Warner Bros. Pictures	Marc Rocco (director); Dan Gordon (screenplay); Christian Slater, Kevin Bacon, Gary Oldman, Embeth Davidtz, Brad Dourif, William H. Macy, R. Lee Ermey, Stephen Tobolowsky, Mia Kirshner, Ben Slack, Stefan Gierasch, Kyra Sedgwick, David Michael Sterling, Michael Melvin	
J A N U A R Y	27	Before Sunrise	Columbia Pictures / Castle Rock Entertainment	Richard Linklater (director/screenplay); Kim Krizan (screenplay); Ethan Hawke, Julie Delpy	
J A N U A R Y	27	Highlander: The Final Dimension	Dimension Films	Andrew Morahan (director); Paul Ohl, René Manzor, Brad Mirman (screenplay); Christopher Lambert, Mario Van Peebles, Deborah Unger, Mako, Martin Neufeld, Raoul Trujillo, Jean-Pierre Perusse, Daniel Do, Jack Ellerton, Gabriel Kakon, Louis Bertignac, Michael Jayston	
J A N U A R Y	27	Miami Rhapsody	Hollywood Pictures	David Frankel (director/screenplay); Sarah Jessica Parker, Gil Bellows, Antonio Banderas, Mia Farrow, Paul Mazursky, Kevin Pollak, Barbara Garrick, Carla Gugino, Bo Eason, Naomi Campbell, Jeremy Piven, Kelly Bishop, Ben Stein, Donal Logue	
J A N U A R Y	31	Gargoyles the Movie: The Heroes Awaken	Buena Vista Home Video / Walt Disney Television Animation	Saburo Hashimoto, Takamitsu Kawamura, Kazuo Terada (directors); Eric Luke, Michael Reaves (screenplay); Thom Adcox-Hernandez, Edward Asner, Jeff Bennett, Clancy Brown, J.D. Daniels, Keith David, Bill Fagerbakke, Jonathan Frakes, Pat Fraley, Ed Gilbert, Peter Renaday, Salli Richardson, Marina Sirtis, Kath Soucie, Frank Welker	
F E B R U A R Y	3	Boys on the Side	Warner Bros. Pictures / Regency Enterprises	Herbert Ross (director); Don Roos (screenplay); Whoopi Goldberg, Mary-Louise Parker, Drew Barrymore, Matthew McConaughey, James Remar, Billy Wirth, Anita Gillette, Dennis Boutsikaris, Estelle Parsons, Amy Aquino, Stan Egi, Stephen Gevedon, Jude Ciccolella, Gedde Watanabe, Jon Seda, Lori Alan, Niecy Nash, Aaron Lustig, George Georgiadis, Indigo Girls, Tito Larriva, Nelson Ascencio, Johnny Sanchez	
F E B R U A R Y	3	In the Mouth of Madness	New Line Cinema	John Carpenter (director); Michael De Luca (screenplay); Sam Neill, Julie Carmen, Jürgen Prochnow, David Warner, John Glover, Bernie Casey, Charlton Heston, Frances Bay, Wilhelm von Homburg, Peter Jason, Kali Rocha, Hayden Christensen, Sean Roberge, Kieran Sells, Kevin Zegers, Katie Zegers	
F E B R U A R Y	3	The Jerky Boys: The Movie	Caravan Pictures	James Melkonian (director/screenplay); Rich Wilkes, John G. Brennan, Kamal Ahmed (screenplay); John G. Brennan, Kamal Ahmed, Alan Arkin, Vincent Pastore, Brian Tarantina, Peter Appel, Brad Sullivan, James Lorinz, Suzanne Shepherd, William Hickey, Alan North, Joe Lisi, Ron Ostrow, Ozzy Osbourne, Helmet	
F E B R U A R Y	3	The Secret of Roan Inish	First Look Pictures	John Sayles (director/screenplay); Mick Lally, Eileen Colgan, John Lynch, Jeni Courtney, Richard Sheridan, Cillian Byrne, Dave Duffy, Pat Slowey, Declan Hannigan, Mairead Ni Ghallchoir, Eugene McHugh, Tony Rubini, Michael MacCarthaigh, Fergal McElherron, Brendan Conroy, Susan Lynch, Frankie McCafferty	
F E B R U A R Y	10	Billy Madison	Universal Pictures	Tamra Davis (director); Adam Sandler, Tim Herlihy (screenplay); Adam Sandler, Bradley Whitford, Josh Mostel, Bridgette Wilson, Norm Macdonald, Darren McGavin, Larry Hankin, Theresa Merritt, Jim Downey, Hrant Alianak, Robert Smigel, Marc Donato, Helen Hughes, Tim Herlihy, Joyce Gordon, Matthew Ferguson, Steve Buscemi, Chris Farley, Mark Beltzman, Dina Platias, Amos Crawley, Greg Valcov	
F E B R U A R Y	10	The Quick and the Dead	TriStar Pictures	Sam Raimi (director); Simon Moore (screenplay); Sharon Stone, Gene Hackman, Russell Crowe, Leonardo DiCaprio, Tobin Bell, Roberts Blossom, Kevin Conway, Keith David, Lance Henriksen, Pat Hingle, Gary Sinise, Mark Boone Junior, Olivia Burnette, Fay Masterson, Raynor Scheine, Woody Strode, Scott Spiegel, Sven-Ole Thorsen, Bruce Campbell, Mick Garris	
F E B R U A R Y	10	Shallow Grave	Gramercy Pictures / PolyGram Filmed Entertainment	Danny Boyle (director); John Hodge (screenplay); Kerry Fox, Christopher Eccleston, Ewan McGregor, Ken Stott, Keith Allen, Colin McCredie, Victoria Naim, Gary Lewis, Jean Marie Coffey, Peter Mullan, Leonard O'Malley, John Hodge	
F E B R U A R Y	17	The Brady Bunch Movie	Paramount Pictures / The Ladd Company	Betty Thomas (director); Bonnie Turner, Terry Turner, Laurice Elehwany, Rick Copp (screenplay); Shelley Long, Gary Cole, Henriette Mantel, Christine Taylor, Christopher Daniel Barnes, Jennifer Elise Cox, Paul Sutera, Olivia Hack, Jesse Lee, David Graf, Michael McKean, Jean Smart, Jack Noseworthy, Moriah Snyder, James Avery, R. D. Robb, Marissa Ribisi, Alanna Ubach, Megan Ward, Elisa Pensler-Gabrielli, RuPaul, Steven Gilborn, Keone Young, David Proval, David Leisure, Archie Hahn, Beverly Archer, Tammy Townsend, Patrick Thomas O'Brien, Eric Nies, Julie Payne, Tamara Mello, Selma Archerd, Reni Santoni, Florence Henderson, Ann B. Davis, Barry Williams, Christopher Knight, Susan Olsen, Mike Lookinland, Davy Jones, Micky Dolenz, Peter Tork, Shane Conrad, Alexander Pourtash, Yolanda Snowball, Robert Rothwell, Arnold F. Turner, Darion Basco, Gaura Vani Buchwald, Shannah Laumeister	
F E B R U A R Y	17	Heavyweights	Walt Disney Pictures / Caravan Pictures	Steven Brill (director/screenplay); Judd Apatow (screenplay); Tom McGowan, Aaron Schwartz, Shaun Weiss, Tom Hodges, Leah Lail, Paul Feig, Kenan Thompson, David Bowe, Max Goldblatt, Jeffrey Tambor, Jerry Stiller, Anne Meara, Ben Stiller, Joseph Wayne Miller, Cody Burger, Allen Covert, Tim Blake Nelson, Judd Apatow, Lauren Michelle Hill, Aubrey Dollar, Deena Dill, Chris M. Allport, Peter Berg, Robert Zalkind, Patrick La Brecque, David Goldman, Nancy Ringham, Seth St. Laurent, Bobby Fain	
F E B R U A R Y	17	Just Cause	Warner Bros. Pictures	Arne Glimcher (director); Jeb Stuart, Peter Stone (screenplay); Sean Connery, Laurence Fishburne, Kate Capshaw, Blair Underwood, Ed Harris, Christopher Murray, Ruby Dee, Scarlett Johansson, Daniel J. Travanti, Ned Beatty, Liz Torres, Lynne Thigpen, Taral Hicks, Victor Slezak, Kevin McCarthy, Hope Lange, Chris Sarandon, George Plimpton, Colleen Ann Fitzpatrick, Richard Liberty	
F E B R U A R Y	17	Mr. Payback: An Interactive Movie	Sony New Technologies / Interfilm Technologies	Bob Gale (director/screenplay); Charles Croughwell (director); Billy Warlock, Holly Fields, Bruce McGill, Christopher Lloyd, Leslie Easterbrook, David Correia, Victor Love, Carol-Ann Plante, Michael Talbott, Brendan Ford, Eddie Deezen, Sasha Jenson, Joseph D. Reitman, Art Evans, Don Calfa, Thomas Rosales Jr., Deborah Harmon, Wendie Jo Sperber, Tracey Ross, Joe Ochman, Ice-T, Eadie Del Rubio, Elena Del Rubio, Milly Del Rubio, Robert Englund, Cheech Marin, Frank Gorshin, Paul Anka, Patrick Pinney, Gilbert Rosales, Robby Sutton	
F E B R U A R Y	24	The Hunted	Universal Pictures	J. F. Lawton (director/screenplay); Christopher Lambert, John Lone, Joan Chen, Yoshio Harada, Yoko Shimada, Mari Natsuki, Takayuki Kubota, Masumi Okada, Tatsuya Irie, Michael Warren, Bart Anderson, James Saito, Seth Sakai, Toshishiro Obata, Ken Kensei, Hiroyasu Takagi, Hiro Kanagawa, Michio Itano, Naoko Sasaki	
F E B R U A R Y	24	The Walking Dead	Savoy Pictures	Preston A. Whitmore II (director/screenplay); Allen Payne, Eddie Griffin, Joe Morton, Vonte Sweet, Roger Floyd, Bernie Mac, Ion Overman, Kyley Jackson, Jean-Claude La Marre, Lena Sang, Wendy Raquel Robinson, Dana Point, Doli Williams, Damon Jones, Kevin Jackson	
F E B R U A R Y	25	Citizen X	HBO Pictures / Citadel Entertainment	Chris Gerolmo (director/screenplay); Stephen Rea, Donald Sutherland, Max von Sydow, Jeffrey DeMunn, Joss Ackland, John Wood, Radu Amzulescu, Imelda Staunton, Andras Balint, Geza Balkay, Ion Caramitru, Jozsa Elek, Marton Elek, Zoltan Gera, Chris Gerolmo, Czeslaw Grocholski, Ralph Nossek, Tusse Silberg	
M A R C H	3	Hideaway	TriStar Pictures	Brett Leonard (director); Andrew Kevin Walker, Neal Jimenez (screenplay); Jeff Goldblum, Christine Lahti, Alicia Silverstone, Jeremy Sisto, Alfred Molina, Rae Dawn Chong, Kenneth Welsh, Tom McBeath, Joely Collins, Roger R. Cross, Michael McDonald, Don S. Davis, Rebecca Toolan, Hiro Kanagawa, Sarah Strange, Saraphina Joachim, Shirley Broderick	
M A R C H	3	Man of the House	Walt Disney Pictures	James Orr (director/screenplay); Jim Cruickshank (screenplay); Chevy Chase, Farrah Fawcett, Jonathan Taylor Thomas, George Wendt, David Shiner, Art LaFleur, Richard Portnow, Richard Foronjy, Ron Canada, Zachary Browne, Tony Sampson, Shane Meier, Ryan O'Neal, Peter Appel, Chief Leonard George, George Greif, Christopher Miranda, Spencer Vrooman, Nicholas Garrett, John DiSanti	
M A R C H	3	The Mangler	New Line Cinema	Tobe Hooper (director); Stephen Brooks, Peter Welbeck (screenplay); Robert Englund, Ted Levine, Daniel Matmor, Jeremy Crutchley, Vanessa Pike, Lisa Morris, Demetre Phillips, Vera Blacker	
M A R C H	3	Roommates	Hollywood Pictures / Interscope Communications	Peter Yates (director); Max Apple, Stephen Metcalfe (screenplay); Peter Falk, D. B. Sweeney, Julianne Moore, Jan Rubeš, Ellen Burstyn, Frankie Faison, Ernie Sabella, John Cunningham, Raymond K. Wong, William H. Macy, Mengze Shi	
M A R C H	3	The Wild Bunch (re-release)	Warner Bros. Pictures	Sam Peckinpah (director/screenplay); Walon Green (screenplay); William Holden, Ernest Borgnine, Robert Ryan, Edmond O'Brien, Warren Oates, Jaime Sánchez, Ben Johnson, Emilio Fernández, Strother Martin, L.Q. Jones, Albert Dekker, Bo Hopkins, Alfonso Arau, Dub Taylor, Chano Urueta, Elsa Cárdenas, Fernando Wagner, Rayford Barnes, Sonia Amelio, Aurora Clavel, Jorge Russek, Paul Harper, Bill Hart, Stephen Ferry	
M A R C H	10	3 Ninjas Knuckle Up	TriStar Pictures	Shin Sang-ok (director); Alex S. Kim (screenplay); Victor Wong, Charles Napier, Michael Treanor, Max Elliott Slade, Chad Power, Vincent Schiavelli, Crystle Lightning, Patrick Kilpatrick, Donal Logue, Scott MacDonald, Donald L. Shanks, Sheldon Peters Wolfchild, Nick Ramus, Don Stark, Dennis Holahan	
M A R C H	10	Muriel's Wedding	Miramax Films	P. J. Hogan (director/screenplay); Toni Collette, Bill Hunter, Rachel Griffiths, Sophie Lee, Jeanie Drynan, Gennie Nevinson, Daniel Lapaine, Matt Day, Roz Hammond, Belinda Jarrett, Pippa Grandison, Daniel Wyllie, Gabby Millgate, Chris Haywood	
M A R C H	10	Outbreak	Warner Bros. Pictures	Wolfgang Petersen (director); Laurence Dworet, Robert Roy Pool (screenplay); Dustin Hoffman, Rene Russo, Morgan Freeman, Cuba Gooding Jr., Patrick Dempsey, Donald Sutherland, Kevin Spacey, Zakes Mokae, Benito Martinez, Bruce Jarchow, Dale Dye, Kara Keough, Maury Sterling, Diana Bellamy, Lance Kerwin, Herbert Jefferson Jr., J.J. Chaback, J.T. Walsh, David A.R. White, Malick Bowens, Susan Lee Hoffman, Leland Hayward III, Daniel Chodos, Jack Rader, Julie Araskog	
M A R C H	17	Bye Bye Love	20th Century Fox	Sam Weisman (director); Gary David Goldberg, Brad Hall (screenplay); Matthew Modine, Randy Quaid, Paul Reiser, Janeane Garofalo, Amy Brenneman, Eliza Dushku, Ed Flanders, Maria Pitillo, Lindsay Crouse, Ross Malinger, Johnny Whitworth, Wendell Pierce, Cameron Boyd, Mae Whitman, Jayne Brook, Dana Wheeler-Nicholson, Amber Benson, Rob Reiner, Brad Hall, Danny Masterson, Caroline Lagerfelt, Christopher Curry, Mina Kolb, Michael Spound, Kate Williamson, Jack Black, Keaton Simons, Ellen Bry, Stephen Root, Ken Tipton	
M A R C H	17	Candyman: Farewell to the Flesh	Gramercy Pictures / Propaganda Films	Bill Condon (director); Rand Ravich, Mark Kruger (screenplay); Tony Todd, Kelly Rowan, Bill Nunn, William O'Leary, Timothy Carhart, Veronica Cartwright, Matt Clark, Randy Oglesby, Joshua Gibran Mayweather, David Gianopoulos, Michael Bergeron, Fay Hauser, Caroline Barclay, Clotiel Bordeltier, Michael Culkin, George Lemore, Ralph Joseph, Margaret Howell	
M A R C H	17	Losing Isaiah	Paramount Pictures	Stephen Gyllenhaal (director/screenplay); Jessica Lange, Halle Berry, Samuel L. Jackson, Cuba Gooding Jr., David Strathairn, Daisy Eagan, Marc John Jefferies, Joie Lee, Regina Taylor, LaTanya Richardson, Jacqueline Brookes	
M A R C H	18	In Pursuit of Honor	HBO Pictures	Ken Olin (director); Dennis Lynton Clark (screenplay); Don Johnson, Craig Sheffer, Gabrielle Anwar, Bob Gunton, James B. Sikking, John Dennis Johnston, Robert Coleby, Neil Melville, Rod Steiger, Terence Crawford, Peter Curtin, Brian McDermott, Justin Monjo, Christopher Dibb	
M A R C H	24	Dolores Claiborne	Columbia Pictures / Castle Rock Entertainment	Taylor Hackford (director); Tony Gilroy (screenplay); Kathy Bates, Jennifer Jason Leigh, David Strathairn, John C. Reilly, Eric Bogosian, Christopher Plummer, Judy Parfitt, Bob Gunton, Ellen Muth, Roy Cooper, Wayne Robson, Ruth Marshall, Kelly Burnett	
M A R C H	24	Exotica	Miramax Films	Atom Egoyan (director/screenplay); Bruce Greenwood, Mia Kirshner, Don McKellar, Arsinee Khanjian, Elias Koteas, Sarah Polley, Victor Garber, David Hemblen, Calvin Green, Peter Krantz, Damon D'Oliveira, Jack Blum, Billy Merasty, Ken McDougall	
M A R C H	24	Major Payne	Universal Pictures	Nick Castle (director); Damon Wayans, Dean Lorey (screenplay); Damon Wayans, Karyn Parsons, Michael Ironside, William Hickey, Steven Martini, Orlando Brown, Albert Hall, Andrew Harrison Leeds, Damien Wayans, Chris Owen, Stephen Coleman, Mark Madison, Peyton Chesson-Fohl, Scott Bigelow, George Cheung	
M A R C H	24	Tall Tale	Walt Disney Pictures / Caravan Pictures	Jeremiah S. Chechik (director); Steven L. Bloom, Robert Rodat (screenplay); Patrick Swayze, Nick Stahl, Oliver Platt, Roger Aaron Brown, Scott Glenn, Catherine O'Hara, Stephen Lang, Jared Harris, Moira Harris, Joe Grifasi, John P. Ryan, Scott Wilson, Bert Kramer, William H. Macy, Burgess Meredith	
M A R C H	31	Born to Be Wild	Warner Bros. Pictures	John Gray (director/screenplay); John Bunzel (screenplay); Wil Horneff, Helen Shaver, John C. McGinley, Peter Boyle, Jean Marie Barnwell, Marvin J. McIntyre, Gregory Itzin, Titus Welliver, Tom Wilson, Alan Ruck, John Procaccino, Obba Babatunde, David Wingert, John Pleshette, Janet Carroll	
M A R C H	31	Bulletproof Heart	Republic Pictures / Keystone Film Company	Mark Malone (director); Gordon Melbourne (screenplay); Anthony LaPaglia, Mimi Rogers, Matt Craven, Peter Boyle, Monika Schnarre, Joseph Maher, Mark Acheson	
M A R C H	31	Funny Bones	Hollywood Pictures	Peter Chelsom (director/screenplay); Peter Flannery (screenplay); Oliver Platt, Jerry Lewis, Lee Evans, Leslie Caron, Richard Griffiths, Sadie Corré, Oliver Reed, George Carl, Freddie Davies, Ian McNeice, Christopher Greet, Ruta Lee, Harold Nicholas, Peter Gunn	
M A R C H	31	Jefferson in Paris	Touchstone Pictures	James Ivory (director); Ruth Prawer Jhabvala (screenplay); Nick Nolte, Greta Scacchi, Jean-Pierre Aumont, Simon Callow, Seth Gilliam, James Earl Jones, Vincent Cassel, Beatrice Winde, Michael Lonsdale, Nancy Marchand, Thandie Newton, Gwyneth Paltrow, Charlotte de Turckheim, Lambert Wilson, Estelle Eonnet, Todd Boyce, Nigel Whitmey, Nicolas Silberg, Elsa Zylberstein, William Moseley, Anthony Valentine, Damien Groelle, Louise Baldan, Valerie Toledano, Vernon Dobtcheff, Jessica Lloyd, Daniel Mesguich, Thibault de Montalembert, Jean-Paul Fouchecourt, Ismail Merchant	
M A R C H	31	Tank Girl	United Artists	Rachel Talalay (director); Tedi Sarafian (screenplay); Lori Petty, Ice-T, Naomi Watts, Malcolm McDowell, Brian Wimmer, Stacy Linn Ramsower, Ann Cusack, Iggy Pop, Ann Magnuson, Jeff Kober, Scott Coffey, Reg E. Cathey, James Hong, Don Harvey, Dawn Robinson, Doug Jones, Roz Witt, Brixton Karnes, Richard Schiff, Clayton Landey, Shane Mahan, Anne Fletcher, Frank Welker	
M A R C H	31	Tommy Boy	Paramount Pictures	Peter Segal (director); Bonnie Turner, Terry Turner (screenplay); Chris Farley, David Spade, Bo Derek, Brian Dennehy, Julie Warner, Rob Lowe, Dan Aykroyd, Sean McCann, Zach Grenier, James Blendick, Ryder Britton, Paul Greenberg, Michael Cram, Dean Marshall, William Dunlop, David Hemblen, Dov Tiefenbach, Helen Hughes, Robert K. Weiss, Corey Sevier, Maria Vacratsis, Colin Fox, Lorri Bagley, David Calderisi, Marc Strange, Jonathan Wilson, Ron James, Jim Codrington, Jerry Schaefer, John Farley, Kevin P. Farley, Clinton Turnbull	

== April–June ==
Opening		Title	Production company	Cast and crew	Ref.
A P R I L	7	An Awfully Big Adventure	Fine Line Features	Mike Newell (director); Charles Wood (screenplay); Alan Rickman, Hugh Grant, Georgina Cates, Alun Armstrong, Peter Firth, Carol Drinkwater, Rita Tushingham, Prunella Scales, Edward Petherbridge, Nicola Pagett, Clive Merrison, Alan Cox, James Frain	
A P R I L	7	Bad Boys	Columbia Pictures / Don Simpson/Jerry Bruckheimer Films	Michael Bay (director); Michael Barrie, Jim Mulholland, Doug Richardson (screenplay); Martin Lawrence, Will Smith, Téa Leoni, Tchéky Karyo, Theresa Randle, Joe Pantoliano, Marg Helgenberger, Nestor Serrano, Julio Oscar Mechoso, Saverio Guerra, Anna Thompson, Kevin Corrigan, Michael Imperioli, Vic Manni, Frank John Hughes, Ralph Gonzales, Marc Macaulay, Emmanuel Xuereb, John Salley, Karen Alexander, Chris Mitchum, Shaun Toub, Kim Coates, Lisa Boyle, Ed Amatrudo	
A P R I L	7	Circle of Friends	Savoy Pictures	Pat O'Connor (director); Andrew Davies (screenplay); Chris O'Donnell, Minnie Driver, Saffron Burrows, Alan Cumming, Colin Firth, Geraldine O'Rawe, Aidan Gillen, Mick Lally, Britta Smith, Ciaran Hinds, Tony Doyle, Jason Barry	
A P R I L	7	Doctor Zhivago (re-release)	Metro-Goldwyn-Mayer	David Lean (director); Robert Bolt (screenplay); Omar Sharif, Julie Christie, Geraldine Chaplin, Rod Steiger, Alec Guinness, Tom Courtenay, Siobhán McKenna, Ralph Richardson, Rita Tushingham, Jeffrey Rockland, Bernard Kay, Klaus Kinski, Gérard Tichy, Noel Willman, Geoffrey Keen, Adrienne Corri, Jack MacGowran, Mark Eden, Erik Chitty, Roger Maxwell, Wolf Frees, Gwen Nelson, Lili Muráti, Peter Madden, Luana Alcañiz, José Maria Caffarel, Pilar Gómez Ferrer, Victor Israel, Inigo Jackson, José Nieto, Ricardo Palacios, Ingrid Pitt, Robert Rietty, Aldo Sambrell, Virgilio Teixiera	
A P R I L	7	Don Juan DeMarco	New Line Cinema / American Zoetrope	Jeremy Leven (director/screenplay); Marlon Brando, Johnny Depp, Faye Dunaway, Geraldine Pailhas, Bob Dishy, Franc Luz, Rachel Ticotin, Talisa Soto, Tommy "Tiny" Lister Jr., Richard C. Sarafian, Tresa Hughes, Stephen Singer, Selena, Marita Geraghty	
A P R I L	7	A Goofy Movie	Walt Disney Pictures	Kevin Lima (director); Jymn Magon, Brian Pimental, Chris Matheson (screenplay); Bill Farmer, Jason Marsden, Jim Cummings, Kellie Martin, Rob Paulsen, Pauly Shore, Wallace Shawn, Jenna von Oy, Tevin Campbell, Frank Welker, Aaron Lohr, Kevin Lima, Florence Stanley, Jo Anne Worley, Joey Lawrence, Julie Brown, Pat Buttram, Dante Basco, Wayne Allwine, Pat Carroll, Corey Burton, Brittany Alyse Smith, Herschel Sparber, E.G. Daily, Brian Pimental, Jason Willinger	
A P R I L	7	Rob Roy	United Artists	Michael Caton-Jones (director); Alan Sharp (screenplay); Liam Neeson, Jessica Lange, John Hurt, Tim Roth, Eric Stoltz, Andrew Keir, Brian Cox, Brian McCardie, Gilbert Martin, Jason Flemyng, Ewan Stewart, David Hayman, Shirley Henderson	
A P R I L	12	Jury Duty	TriStar Pictures	John Fortenberry (director); Evan C. Branham (screenplay); Pauly Shore, Tia Carrere, Stanley Tucci, Brian Doyle-Murray, Abe Vigoda, Charles Napier, Shelley Winters, Sean Whalen, Richard Edson, Richard Riehle, Alex Datcher, Richard T. Jones, Jack McGee, Sharon Barr, Nick Bakay, Ernie Lee Banks, Dick Vitale, Billie Bird, William Newman, Jorge Luis Abreu, Siobhan Fallon, Gregory Cooke, Mark L. Taylor	
A P R I L	12	The Pebble and the Penguin	Metro-Goldwyn-Mayer / Don Bluth Entertainment	Don Bluth, Gary Goldman (directors); Rachel Koretsky, Steven Whitestone (screenplay); Martin Short, James Belushi, Tim Curry, Annie Golden, Alissa King, Louise Vallance, Will Ryan, Neil Ross, Stan Jones, S. Scott Bullock, Philip L. Clarke, Shani Wallis, B.J. Ward, Hamilton Camp, Angeline Ball, Kendall Cunningham, Pat Musick, Michael Nunes, Maggie Roswell	
A P R I L	12	Stuart Saves His Family	Paramount Pictures	Harold Ramis (director); Al Franken (screenplay); Al Franken, Laura San Giacomo, Vincent D'Onofrio, Shirley Knight, Lesley Boone, Harris Yulin, Julia Sweeney, Joe Flaherty, Robin Duke, Richard Riehle, Kurt Fuller, Justin Roberts, Michelle Horn, Tom Dugan, Camille Saviola, Patrick Kerr, Aaron Lustig, Fred Applegate, Darrell Larson, Dakin Matthews, Lewis Arquette, Michael G. Hagerty, Allen Garfield, Walter Olkewicz, Steven Kampmann, Robert Curtis Brown, Aloma Wright, David Pasquesi, Ted Raimi, Gerrit Graham, Phil Hartman, Kevin Michael Richardson, Ken Tipton	
A P R I L	19	New Jersey Drive	Gramercy Pictures / 40 Acres and a Mule Filmworks	Nick Gomez (director/screenplay); Michel Marriott (screenplay); Sharron Corley, Gabriel Casseus, Saul Stein, Gwen McGee, Donald Faison, Heavy D, Roscoe Orman, Michael Pincus, Christine Baranski, Paul Schulze, Arthur Nascarella	
A P R I L	21	The Basketball Diaries	New Line Cinema / Island Pictures	Scott Kalvert (director); Bryan Goluboff (screenplay); Leonardo DiCaprio, Bruno Kirby, Lorraine Bracco, Ernie Hudson, Patrick McGaw, James Madio, Michael Imperioli, Mark Wahlberg, Juliette Lewis, Michael Rapaport, Alexander Chaplin, Manny Alfaro, Cynthia Daniel, Brittany Daniel, Jim Carroll, Roy Cooper	
A P R I L	21	The Cure	Universal Pictures	Peter Horton (director); Robert Kuhn (screenplay); Joseph Mazzello, Brad Renfro, Diana Scarwid, Annabella Sciorra, Aeryk Egan, Nicky Katt, Renee Humphrey, Bruce Davison, Andrew Broder, Jeremy Howard	
A P R I L	21	Kiss of Death	20th Century Fox	Barbet Schroeder (director); Ben Hecht, Charles Lederer, Eleazar Lipsky, Richard Price (screenplay); David Caruso, Nicolas Cage, Samuel L. Jackson, Helen Hunt, Ving Rhames, Stanley Tucci, Kathryn Erbe, Michael Rapaport, Philip Baker Hall, Anthony Heald, Katie Sagona, John Costelloe, Anne Meara, Kevin Corrigan, Hope Davis, Frank DiLeo, Edward McDonald, Joe Lisi, Ed Trucco, Paul Calderon, Jay O. Sanders	
A P R I L	21	Swimming with Sharks	Trimark Pictures	George Huang (director/screenplay); Kevin Spacey, Frank Whaley, Michelle Forbes, Benicio del Toro, Jerry Levine, T.E. Russell, Roy Dotrice, Matthew Flynt, Patrick Fischler	
A P R I L	21	While You Were Sleeping	Hollywood Pictures / Caravan Pictures	Jon Turteltaub (director); Daniel G. Sullivan, Frederic Lebow (screenplay); Sandra Bullock, Bill Pullman, Peter Gallagher, Peter Boyle, Jack Warden, Glynis Johns, Micole Mercurio, Jason Bernard, Michael Rispoli, Ally Walker, Monica Keena	
A P R I L	26	Friday	New Line Cinema	F. Gary Gray (director); Ice Cube, DJ Pooh (screenplay); Ice Cube, Chris Tucker, Nia Long, Tommy "Tiny" Lister Jr., Regina King, Anna Maria Horsford, Bernie Mac, John Witherspoon, Paula Jai Parker, Faizon Love, DJ Pooh, Anthony Johnson, Angela Means, F. Gary Gray, LaWanda Page	
A P R I L	28	Crumb	Sony Pictures Classics	Terry Zwigoff (director); Robert Crumb, Aline Kominsky-Crumb, Charles Crumb, Jack Harrington	
A P R I L	28	Destiny Turns on the Radio	Savoy Pictures	Jack Baran (director); Robert Ramsey, Matthew Stone (screenplay); James LeGros, Dylan McDermott, Quentin Tarantino, Nancy Travis, James Belushi, Tracey Walter, Allen Garfield, Janet Carroll, David Cross, Richard Edson, Bobcat Goldthwait, Barry Shabaka Henley, Lisa Jane Persky, Sarah Trigger	
A P R I L	28	A Pyromaniac's Love Story	Hollywood Pictures	Joshua Brand (director); Morgan Ward (screenplay); William Baldwin, John Leguizamo, Sadie Frost, Erika Eleniak, Michael Lerner, Joan Plowright, Armin Mueller-Stahl, Mike Starr	
A P R I L	28	Top Dog	Live Entertainment	Aaron Norris (director); Ron Swanson (screenplay); Chuck Norris, Michele Lamar Richards, Erik von Detten, Carmine Caridi, Clyde Kusatsu, Kai Wulff, Peter Savard Moore, Timothy Bottoms, Francesco Quinn, Herta Ware, John Kerry	
A P R I L	28	The Underneath	Universal Pictures / Gramercy Pictures	Steven Soderbergh (director/screenplay); Daniel Fuchs (screenplay); Peter Gallagher, Alison Elliott, William Fichtner, Adam Trese, Joe Don Baker, Paul Dooley, Shelley Duvall, Elisabeth Shue	
A P R I L	28	Village of the Damned	Universal Pictures	John Carpenter (director); David Himmelstein (screenplay); Christopher Reeve, Kirstie Alley, Linda Kozlowski, Mark Hamill, Michael Paré, Meredith Salenger, Karen Kahn, Pippa Pearthree, Thomas Dekker, Lindsey Haun, Cody Dorkin, Trishalee Hardy, Jessye Quarry, Adam Robbins, Chelsea DeRidder Simms, Renee Rene Simms, Danielle Keaton	
A P R I L	29	Tyson	HBO Pictures	Uli Edel (director); Robert Johnson (screenplay); George C. Scott, Paul Winfield, Michael Jai White, James B. Sikking, Malcolm-Jamal Warner, Tony Lo Bianco, Clark Gregg, Holt McCallany, Kristen Wilson, Sheila Wills, Regal Hanley, Lilyan Chauvin, Rebekah Johnson, George Murdock, Jimmy Bridges, Dayton Callie, Reg E. Cathey, Michael Jace, Larry Merchant, Rashaan Nall, Miguel Perez, Jacqueline Schultz, Duane Davis, Mills Lane, Tico Wells, Muhammed Ali, Jack Johnson, Joe Louis, Rocky Marciano	
M A Y	3	My Family	New Line Cinema	Gregory Nava (director/screenplay); Anna Thomas (screenplay); Jimmy Smits, Esai Morales, Edward James Olmos, Elpidia Carrillo, Enrique Castillo, Rafael Cortes, Michael DeLorenzo, Constance Marie, Scott Bakula, Lupe Ontiveros, Leon Singer, Mary Steenburgen, Dedee Pfeiffer, Bibi Besch, Bruce Gray, Eduardo Lopez Rojas, Jenny Gago, Jonathan Hernandez, Greg Albert, Maria Canals, Jacob Vargas, Jennifer Lopez	
M A Y	3	Panther	PolyGram Filmed Entertainment / Gramercy Pictures	Mario Van Peebles (director/screenplay); Kadeem Hardison, Bokeem Woodbine, Joe Don Baker, Courtney B. Vance, Marcus Chong, Tyrin Turner, James Russo, Nefertiti, M. Emmet Walsh, Wesley Jonathan, Anthony Griffith, Chris Rock, Mario Van Peebles, Chris Tucker, Bobby Brown, Angela Bassett, Jenifer Lewis, Dick Gregory, James LeGros, Kool Moe Dee, Roger Guenveur Smith, Richard Dysart, Michael Wincott, James Russo, Jeris Poindexter, Melvin Van Peebles, Joan Tarika Lewis	
M A Y	5	French Kiss	20th Century Fox / PolyGram Filmed Entertainment	Lawrence Kasdan (director); Adam Brooks (screenplay); Meg Ryan, Kevin Kline, Timothy Hutton, Jean Reno, François Cluzet, Susan Anbeh, Marie-Christine Adam, Jean-Paul Jaupart, Renee Humphrey, Michael Riley, Laurent Spielvogel, Victor Garrivier, Elisabeth Commelin, Julie Leibowitch, Miquel Brown, Claudio Todeschini, Jerry Harte	
M A Y	12	Crimson Tide	Hollywood Pictures / Don Simpson/Jerry Bruckheimer Films	Tony Scott (director); Michael Schiffer (screenplay); Denzel Washington, Gene Hackman, George Dzundza, Viggo Mortensen, James Gandolfini, Matt Craven, Rocky Carroll, Jaime P. Gomez, Michael Milhoan, Scott Burkholder, Danny Nucci, Lillo Brancato Jr., Rick Schroder, Steve Zahn, Mark Christopher Lawrence, Ryan Phillippe, Daniel von Bargen, Jason Robards	
M A Y	12	The Englishman Who Went up a Hill but Came down a Mountain	Miramax Films	Christopher Monger (director); Ivor Monger (screenplay); Hugh Grant, Ian McNeice, Tara Fitzgerald, Colm Meaney, Ian Hart, Robert Pugh, Kenneth Griffith, Ieuan Rhys	
M A Y	12	Gordy	Miramax Films / RAS Entertainment Ltd. / Robson Entertainment	Mark Lewis (director); Leslie Stevens (screenplay); Doug Stone, Tom Lester, Afemo Omilami, Hamilton Camp, Frank Welker, Tress MacNeille, Earl Boen, Blake McIver Ewing, Jim Meskimen, Kristy Young, Deborah Hobart, Michael Roescher, James Donadio, Ted Manson, Tom Key, Jon Kohler, Justin Garms, Jocelyn Blue, Frank Soronow, Billy Bodine, Julianna Harris, Sabrina Weiner, Heather Bahler	
M A Y	12	The Perez Family	The Samuel Goldwyn Company	Mira Nair (director); Robin Swicord (screenplay); Marisa Tomei, Alfred Molina, Anjelica Huston, Chazz Palminteri, Trini Alvarado, Celia Cruz, Ranjit Chowdhry, Diego Wallraff, Ellen Cleghorne, Angela Lanza, Jose Felipe Padron, Lazaro Perez, Bill Sage, Vincent Gallo, Billy Hopkins, Ruben Rabasa, Melissa Anne Acosta	
M A Y	14	Stephen King's The Langoliers	ABC / Laurel Entertainment	Tom Holland (director/teleplay); Patricia Wettig, Dean Stockwell, David Morse, Mark Lindsay Chapman, Frankie Faison, Christopher Collet, Kate Maberly, Bronson Pinchot, John Griesemer, Stephen King, Tom Holland, Baxter Harris, Kimber Riddle, Christopher Cooke	
M A Y	17	The City of Lost Children	Sony Pictures Classics	Marc Caro (director); Jean-Pierre Jeunet (director/screenplay); Gilles Adrien (screenplay); Ron Perlman, Daniel Emilfork, Judith Vittet, Joseph Lucien, Dominique Pinon, Jean-Claude Dreyfus, Genevieve Brunet, Odile Mallet, Mireille Mosse, Serge Merlin, Francois-Hadji-Lazaro, Rufus, Ticky Holgado, Jean-Louis Trintignant, Marc Caro, Lorella Cravotta	
M A Y	19	Die Hard with a Vengeance	20th Century Fox / Cinergi Pictures	John McTiernan (director); Jonathan Hensleigh (screenplay); Bruce Willis, Jeremy Irons, Samuel L. Jackson, Graham Greene, Colleen Camp, Larry Bryggman, Anthony Peck, Nick Wyman, Sam Phillips, Stephen Pearlman, Kevin Chamberlin, Richard Council, Mischa Hausserman, Phil Theis, Robert Sedgwick, Sven Torvaid, Timothy Adams, Tony Halme, Greg Skrovic, Bill Christ, Gerrit Vooren, Willis Sparks, Michael Cristofer, Charles Dumas, Aldis Hodge, Michael Alexander Jackson	
M A Y	19	Forget Paris	Columbia Pictures / Castle Rock Entertainment	Billy Crystal (director/screenplay); Lowell Ganz, Babaloo Mandel (screenplay); Billy Crystal, Debra Winger, Joe Mantegna, Julie Kavner, Cynthia Stevenson, Richard Masur, Cathy Moriarty, William Hickey, John Spencer, Tom Wright, Johnny Williams, Robert Costanzo, Dan Castellaneta, Marv Albert, Bill Walton, Charles Barkley, David Robinson, Dan Majerle, Kevin Johnson, Paul Westphal, Sean Elliott, Patrick Ewing, Tim Hardaway, Kareem Abdul-Jabbar, Bill Laimbeer, Reggie Miller, Chris Mullin, Charles Oakley, Kurt Rambis, John Starks, Isiah Thomas, Spud Webb, Marques Johnson, Rush Limbaugh, David Sanborn, David St. James, Lisa Rieffel, Margaret Nagle, Judyann Elder, Patrick Thomas O'Brien, Clint Howard, Andre Rosey Brown, Liz Sheridan, Scooter Barry, Sam Crawford, Greg Foster, Gary Maloncon, Paul McCracken, Mike McGee, Nigel Miguel, Larry Spriggs, Reggie Theus	
M A Y	19	Little Odessa	Fine Line Features	James Gray (director/screenplay); Tim Roth, Edward Furlong, Moira Kelly, Vanessa Redgrave, Maximilian Schell, Mina Bern, Paul Guilfoyle, Natalya Andrejchenko, David Vadim, Boris McGiver, Tuesday Knight, Michael Khmurov, Dmitry Preyers, David Ross, Marianna Lead, Mohammed Ghaffari	
M A Y	19	A Little Princess	Warner Bros. Pictures	Alfonso Cuarón (director); Richard LaGravenese, Elizabeth Chandler (screenplay); Liesel Matthews, Eleanor Bron, Liam Cunningham, Vanessa Lee Chester, Taylor Fry, Heather DeLoach, Kelsey Mulrooney, Rusty Schwimmer, Arthur Malet, Errol Sitahal, Camilla Belle, Rachael Bella, Jonas Cuaron, Ken Palmer, Vincent Schiavelli, Peggy Miley	
M A Y	20	Indictment: The McMartin Trial	HBO Pictures	Mick Jackson (director); Abby Mann, Myra Mann (screenplay); James Woods, Mercedes Ruehl, Lolita Davidovich, Henry Thomas, Sada Thompson, Shirley Knight, Alison Elliott, Mark Blum, Chelsea Field, Joe Urla, Scott Waara, Valerie Wildman, Richard Bradford, Roberta Bassin, Patricia Belcher, Gabrielle Boni, Dennis Burkley, Bob Clendenin, James Cromwell, Miriam Flynn, Castulo Guerra, Greg Lauren, Josefina Lopez, Mary Mara, Sandy Martin, Courtland Mead, William Mesnik, Rolando Molina, Vic Polizos, Richard Portnow, Jack Rader, Kerry Remsen, Shane Sweet, Kevin Symons, Bernard White, Kenneth White, Trevor Coppola, Scarlett Pomers, Nicollette Sheridan, Tom Wyner	
M A Y	21	Above Suspicion	HBO Pictures / Rysher Entertainment	Steven Schachter (director/screenplay); Jerry Lazarus, William H. Macy (screenplay); Christopher Reeve, Joe Mantegna, Kim Cattrall, Edward Kerr, Geoffrey Rivas, Finola Hughes, William H. Macy, Ron Canada, Natalia Nogulich, Clark Gregg, Marty Levy, J.J. Johnston, Blake Foster, Frank Medrano, Joanna Miles, Gerald Castillo, Timothy Landfield, Peter Michael Goetz, Lionel Mark Smith, Sandy Martin, Arthur Taxier, Dana Reeve, Holley Chant, David Byron, Seidy Lopez, Ellis Williams	
M A Y	24	Braveheart	Paramount Pictures / Icon Productions / The Ladd Company	Mel Gibson (director); Randall Wallace (screenplay); Mel Gibson, Sophie Marceau, Patrick McGoohan, Catherine McCormack, Angus Macfadyen, Brendan Gleeson, Peter Hanly, James Cosmo, David O'Hara, Ian Bannen, Sean McGinley, Brian Cox, Sean Lawlor, Sandy Nelson, Stephen Billington, John Kavanagh, Alun Armstrong, John Murtagh, Tommy Flanagan, Donal Gibson, Jeanne Marine, Michael Byrne, Malcolm Tierney, Bernard Horsfall, Peter Mullan, Gerard McSorley, Richard Leaf, Mark Lees, Tam White, Jimmy Chisholm, David Gant	
M A Y	24	Tales from the Hood	Savoy Pictures	Rusty Cundieff (director); Darin Scott (screenplay); Clarence Williams III, Joe Torry, Samuel Monroe Jr., De'Aundre Bonds, Tom Wright, Anthony Griffith, Wings Hauser, Michael Massee, Duane Whitaker, Brandon Hammond, Rusty Cundieff, Paula Jai Parker, David Alan Grier, Corbin Bernsen, Roger Guenveur Smith, Art Evans, Lamont Bentley, Rosalind Cash	
M A Y	26	Casper	Universal Pictures / The Harvey Entertainment Company / Amblin Entertainment	Brad Silberling (director); Sherri Stoner, Deanna Oliver (screenplay); Christina Ricci, Bill Pullman, Cathy Moriarty, Eric Idle, Garette Ratliff Henson, Jessica Wesson, Amy Brenneman, Ben Stein, Chauncey Leopardi, Spencer Vrooman, Malachi Pearson, Devon Sawa, Joe Nipote, Joe Alaskey, Brad Garrett, Don Novello, Dan Aykroyd, Fred Rogers, Terry Murphy, Clint Eastwood, Rodney Dangerfield, Mel Gibson, John Kassir, Brock Winkless, Jess Harnell	
M A Y	26	Johnny Mnemonic	TriStar Pictures	Robert Longo (director); William Gibson (screenplay); Keanu Reeves, Dolph Lundgren, Beat Takeshi, Ice-T, Dina Meyer, Henry Rollins, Udo Kier, Von Flores, Denis Akiyama, Barbara Sukowa, Tracy Tweed, Falconer Abraham, Don Francks, Diego Chambers, Arthur Eng	
M A Y	26	Mad Love	Touchstone Pictures	Antonia Bird (director); Paula Milne (screenplay); Chris O'Donnell, Drew Barrymore, Matthew Lillard, Joan Allen, Jude Ciccolella, Amy Sakasitz, Kevin Dunn, Elaine Miles, Liev Schreiber	
J U N E	2	The Bridges of Madison County	Warner Bros. Pictures / Amblin Entertainment	Clint Eastwood (director); Richard LaGravenese (screenplay); Clint Eastwood, Meryl Streep, Annie Corley, Victor Slezak, Jim Haynie, Phyllis Lyons, Debra Monk, Richard Lage, Michelle Benes	
J U N E	2	Fluke	Metro-Goldwyn-Mayer	Carlo Carlei (director/screenplay); James Carrington (screenplay); Matthew Modine, Nancy Travis, Eric Stoltz, Samuel L. Jackson, Jon Polito, Max Pomeranc, Ron Perlman, Bill Cobbs, Sam Gifaldi, Collin Wilcox Paxton	
J U N E	2	The Glass Shield	Miramax Films	Charles Burnett (director/screenplay); John Eddie Johnson, Ned Welsh (screenplay); Erich Anderson, Richard Anderson, Michael Boatman, Bernie Casey, Ice Cube, Victoria Dillard, Elliott Gould, Don Harvey, Tommy Hicks, Michael Ironside, Natalia Nogulich, Wanda De Jesus, Lori Petty, M. Emmet Walsh, Gary Wood	
J U N E	9	Congo	Paramount Pictures / The Kennedy/Marshall Company	Frank Marshall (director); John Patrick Shanley (screenplay); Laura Linney, Dylan Walsh, Ernie Hudson, Tim Curry, Grant Heslov, Joe Don Baker, Adewale Akinnuoye-Agbaje, Joe Pantoliano, Delroy Lindo, John Hawkes, Kevin Grevioux, Bruce Campbell, Taylor Nichols, Mary Ellen Trainor, Stuart Pankin, Carolyn Seymour, Romy Rosemont, James Karen, Peter Jason, Jimmy Buffett, Thom Barry, Michael Chinyamurindi, Shayna Fox	
J U N E	9	Party Girl	First Look Pictures	Daisy von Scherler Mayer (director/screenplay); Harry Birckmayer, Sheila Gaffney (screenplay); Parker Posey, Anthony DeSando, Guillermo Diaz, Donna Mitchell, Liev Schreiber, Omar Townsend, Sasha von Scherler	
J U N E	9	Smoke	Miramax Films	Wayne Wang (director); Paul Auster (director/screenplay); William Hurt, Harvey Keitel, Stockard Channing, Harold Perrineau Jr., Giancarlo Esposito, Ashley Judd, Forest Whitaker, Jose Zuniga, Jared Harris, Deirdre O'Connell, Victor Argo, Michelle Hurst, Erica Gimpel, Malik Yoba, Mary B. Ward, Clarice Taylor, Daniel Auster	
J U N E	9	Wigstock: The Movie	The Samuel Goldwyn Company	Barry Shils (director); Alexis Arquette, Jackie Beat, Candis Cayne, Chloe Dzubilo, Crystal Waters, Miss Coco Peru, Deee-Lite, Lady Miss Kier, Howie Pyro, Lina Bradford, Joey Arias, The 'Lady' Bunny, Leigh Bowery, Anohni, John Epperson, Jayne County, Deborah Harry, RuPaul, John Sex, Tabboo!, Miss Understood, Wendy Wild, Thom Fitzgerald, Willi Ninja, Donna Giles, Paul Alexander, The Dueling Bankheads, Flloyd, Flotilla De Barge, John Kelly, Nicola Bowery, Lara Allen, Mistress Formika, Thairin Smothers, Mark White, Susan Whittle, John Cantwell, Glamorous Monique, Freddie Pendavis	
J U N E	16	Batman Forever	Warner Bros. Pictures	Joel Schumacher (director); Lee Batchler, Janet Scott-Batchler, Akiva Goldsman (screenplay); Val Kilmer, Tommy Lee Jones, Jim Carrey, Nicole Kidman, Chris O'Donnell, Michael Gough, Pat Hingle, Drew Barrymore, Debi Mazar, Ed Begley Jr., Ofer Samra, René Auberjonois, Joe Grifasi, Philip Moon, Jessica Tuck, Kimberly Scott, Michael Paul Chan, Jon Favreau, Greg Lauren, Eileen Seeley, Jack Betts, George Wallace, Bob Zmuda, Rebecca Budig, Don "The Dragon" Wilson, Terry Ellis, John Fink, Kevin Grevioux, Deron McBee, Mike Smith, George Cheung, Mitchell Gaylord, Bob Kane, United States Senator Patrick Leahy, Ve Neill, Elizabeth Sanders, Dennis Paladino, Ramsey Ellis, Michael Scranton	
J U N E	16	The Incredibly True Adventure of Two Girls in Love	New Line Cinema	Maria Maggenti (director/screenplay); Laurel Holloman, Nicole Ari Parker, Maggie Moore, Kate Stafford, Sabrina Artel, Nelson Rodriguez, Dale Dickey, John Elsen, Stephanie Berry, Toby Poser, Andrew Wright	
J U N E	23	Pocahontas	Walt Disney Pictures	Mike Gabriel, Eric Goldberg (directors); Carl Binder, Susannah Grant, Philip LaZebnik (screenplay); Irene Bedard, Mel Gibson, David Ogden Stiers, John Kassir, Russell Means, Christian Bale, Linda Hunt, Danny Mann, Billy Connolly, Michelle St. John, James Apaumut Fall, Gordon Tootoosis, Jim Cummings, Frank Welker	
J U N E	23	Safe	Sony Pictures Classics	Todd Haynes (director/screenplay); Julianne Moore, Peter Friedman, Xander Berkeley, James LeGros, Susan Norman, Kate McGregor-Stewart, Mary Carver, Steven Gilborn, April Grace, Lorna Scott, Jodie Markell, Brandon Cruz, Dean Norris, Jessica Harper, Beth Grant	
J U N E	23	Sister My Sister	NFH Productions	Nancy Meckler (director); Wendy Kesselman (screenplay); Julie Walters, Joely Richardson, Jodhi May	
J U N E	24	The Infiltrator	HBO Showcase	John Mackenzie (director); Guy Andrews (screenplay); Oliver Platt, Arliss Howard, Tony Haygarth, Michael Byrne, Julian Glover, George Jackos, Alex Kingston, Jonny Phillips, Peter Riegert, Alan King, Colin Stinton, Anne Reid, Christian Redi, Werner Dissel, Bernd Michael Lade, Sven Martinek, Celia Montague, George Raistrick	
J U N E	27	Leprechaun 3	Trimark Pictures / Vidmark Entertainment / Blue Rider Productions	Brian Trenchard-Smith (director); David DuBos (screenplay); Warwick Davis, John Gatins, Lee Armstrong, John DeMita, Michael Callan, Caroline Williams, Marcelo Tubert, Tom Dugan, Leigh-Allyn Baker, Richard Reicheg, Linda Shayne, Ian Gregory, Roger Hewlett, Terry Lee Crisp, Jennifer Stein, Susan Skinner, P. 'Trash' Temperill, Heidi Staley, Giovanni Jackson, Merle Kennedy, Rod McCary, Darren Michaels, Steven Swadling, Zoe Trilling, Henry Young	
J U N E	28	Belle de Jour (re-release)	Miramax Films	Luis Buñuel (director/screenplay); Jean-Claude Carrière (screenplay); Catherine Deneuve, Jean Sorel, Michel Piccoli, Geneviève Page, Pierre Clémenti, Françoise Fabian, Macha Méril, Maria Latour, Marguerite Muni, Francis Blanche, François Maistre, Georges Marchal, Francisco Rabal	
J U N E	30	Apollo 13	Universal Pictures / Imagine Entertainment	Ron Howard (director); William Broyles Jr., Al Reinert (screenplay); Tom Hanks, Kevin Bacon, Bill Paxton, Gary Sinise, Ed Harris, Kathleen Quinlan, Mary Kate Schellhardt, Emily Ann Lloyd, Miko Hughes, Max Elliott Slade, Jean Speegle Howard, Tracy Reiner, David Andrews, Michele Little, Chris Ellis, Joe Spano, Xander Berkeley, Marc McClure, Clint Howard, Loren Dean, Tom Wood, Ray McKinnon, Max Grodénchik, Christian Clemenson, Brett Cullen, Ned Vaughn, Andy Milder, Geoffrey Blake, Wayne Duvall, Jim Meskimen, Joseph Culp, Todd Louiso, Gabriel Jarret, Christopher John Fields, Endre Hules, Meadow Williams, Brian Markinson, Austin O'Brien, Thom Barry, Carl Gabriel Yorke, Rance Howard, J.J. Chaback, Todd Hallowell, Roger Corman, Jack Conley, Jeffrey S. Kluger, Herbert Jefferson Jr., John Dullaghan, John Wheeler, Paul Mantee, Neil Armstrong, Jules Bergman, Pope Paul VI, Walter Cronkite, Bryce Dallas Howard, Chet Huntley, Chauntal Lewis, Jim Lovell, Marilyn Lovell	
J U N E	30	Judge Dredd	Hollywood Pictures / Cinergi Pictures	Danny Cannon (director); William Wisher Jr., Steven E. de Souza (screenplay); Sylvester Stallone, Armand Assante, Diane Lane, Rob Schneider, Joan Chen, Jürgen Prochnow, Max von Sydow, James Earl Jones, Adrienne Barbeau, James Remar, Joanna Miles, Balthazar Getty, Maurice Roeves, Ian Dury, Mitchell Ryan, Bradley Lavelle, Lex Daniel, Scott Wilson, Christopher Adamson, Ewen Bremner, Phil Smeeton, Peter Marinker, Angus MacInnes, Mark Moraghan, Al Sapienza	
J U N E	30	Mighty Morphin Power Rangers: The Movie	20th Century Fox	Bryan Spicer (director); Arne Olsen (screenplay); Karan Ashley, Johnny Yong Bosch, Steve Cardenas, Jason David Frank, Amy Jo Johnson, David Yost, Jason Narvy, Paul Schrier, Paul Freeman, Gabrielle Fitzpatrick, Nicholas Bell, Peta-Maree Rixon, Jean Paul Bell, Kerry Casey, Mark Ginther, Julia Cortez, Jamie Croft, Paul Goddard, Robert Simper, Kerrigan Mahan, Robert L. Manahan, Robert Axelrod, Barbara Goodson, Richard Wood, Martin G. Metcalf	

== July–September ==
Opening		Title	Production company	Cast and crew	Ref.
J U L Y	7	First Knight	Columbia Pictures / Zucker Brothers Productions	Jerry Zucker (director); William Nicholson (screenplay); Sean Connery, Richard Gere, Julia Ormond, Ben Cross, John Gielgud, Liam Cunningham, Christopher Villiers, Valentine Pelka, Colin McCormack, Alexis Denisof, Ralph Ineson, Stuart Bunce, Angus Wright, Owain Griffiths	
J U L Y	7	Species	Metro-Goldwyn-Mayer	Roger Donaldson (director); Dennis Feldman (screenplay); Ben Kingsley, Michael Madsen, Alfred Molina, Forest Whitaker, Marg Helgenberger, Natasha Henstridge, Whip Hubley, Michelle Williams, Jordan Lund, Esther Scott, Shirley Prestia, William Utay, Herta Ware, Gary Bullock, Anthony Guidera, Matthew Ashford, Patricia Belcher, Richard Fancy, Dana Hee, Frank Welker, Andrzej Bartkowiak, Jellybean Benitez, Roger Donaldson, Zak Knutson, Coati Mundi	
J U L Y	11	Darkman II: The Return of Durant	MCA Universal Home Video / Renaissance Pictures	Bradford May (director); Steven McKay (screenplay); Arnold Vosloo, Larry Drake, Kim Delaney, Renee O'Connor, Lawrence Dane, Jesse Collins, David Ferry, Jack Langedijk, Catherine Swing, Rod Wilson, Sten Eirik, Steve Mousseau, James Millington, Kevin Rushton, Phillip Jarrett, Graham Rowat, Chris Gillett, David Clement, Donna Mullin	
J U L Y	12	Nine Months	20th Century Fox / 1492 Pictures	Chris Columbus (director/screenplay); Patrick Braoudé (screenplay); Hugh Grant, Julianne Moore, Tom Arnold, Joan Cusack, Jeff Goldblum, Robin Williams, Mia Cottet, Joey Simmrin, Ashley Johnson, Alexa Vega, Aislin Roche, Zelda Williams, Charles Martinet, Kristin Davis, Priscilla Alden, Betsy Aidem	
J U L Y	14	The Indian in the Cupboard	Paramount Pictures / Columbia Pictures / The Kennedy/Marshall Company	Frank Oz (director); Melissa Mathison (screenplay); Hal Scardino, Litefoot, David Keith, Lindsay Crouse, Richard Jenkins, Rishi Bhat, Steve Coogan, Nestor Serrano, Vincent Kartheiser, Michael Papajohn, Frank Welker, Sakina Jaffrey, Ryan Olson	
J U L Y	14	Under Siege 2: Dark Territory	Warner Bros. Pictures / Regency Enterprises	Geoff Murphy (director); Richard Hatem, Matt Reeves (screenplay); Steven Seagal, Eric Bogosian, Katherine Heigl, Morris Chestnut, Everett McGill, Brenda Bakke, Nick Mancuso, Peter Greene, Patrick Kilpatrick, Scott Sowers, Andy Romano, Dale Dye, Kurtwood Smith, Jonathan Banks, Royce D. Applegate, Julius R. Nasso, Phyllis Davis, D.C. Douglas, Thom Adcox-Hernandez, Al Sapienza, Ping Wu, Henry Kingi, James Lew, John Machado, Manny Perry, Sandra Taylor, David Gianopoulos, Afifi Alaouie, Dale Payne	
J U L Y	19	Clueless	Paramount Pictures	Amy Heckerling (director/screenplay); Alicia Silverstone, Stacey Dash, Brittany Murphy, Paul Rudd, Donald Faison, Breckin Meyer, Elisa Donovan, Jeremy Sisto, Justin Walker, Dan Hedaya, Wallace Shawn, Twink Caplan, Julie Brown, Nicole Bilderback, Sean Holland, Jace Alexander, Carl Gottlieb, Joseph D. Reitman, The Mighty Mighty Bosstones, Amy Heckerling	
J U L Y	19	Free Willy 2: The Adventure Home	Warner Bros. Pictures / Regency Enterprises	Dwight H. Little (director); Karen Janszen, Corey Blechman, John Mattson (screenplay); Jason James Richter, Francis Capra, Mary Kate Schellhardt, August Schellenberg, Michael Madsen, Jayne Atkinson, Mykelti Williamson, Elizabeth Peña, Jon Tenney, M. Emmet Walsh, John Considine, Steve Kahan, Al Sapienza, Basil Wallace, Marguerite Moreau, Scott Stuber, Joan Lunden, Paul Tuerpe, Neal Matarazzo	
J U L Y	21	Living in Oblivion	Sony Pictures Classics	Tom DiCillo (director/screenplay); Steve Buscemi, Catherine Keener, Dermot Mulroney, Danielle von Zerneck, James LeGros, Peter Dinklage, Michele Carlo, Rica Martens, Michael Griffiths, Hilary Gilford	
J U L Y	28	Country Life	Miramax Films / Umbrella Entertainment	Michael Blakemore (director/screenplay); Anton Chekhov (screenplay); Sam Neill, Greta Scacchi, John Hargreaves, Kerry Fox, Michael Blakemore, Googie Withers, Patricia Kennedy, Ron Blanchard, Maurie Fields, Bryan Marshall, Tony Barry, Tom Long, Ian Bliss, Reg Cribb, Robyn Cruze, Terry Brady, Rob Steele, Colin Taylor, Ian Cockburn	
J U L Y	28	Double Happiness	Fine Line Features	Mina Shum (director/screenplay); Sandra Oh, Callum Keith Rennie, Stephen M.D. Chang, Alannah Ong, Frances You, Johnny Mah, Claudette Carracedo, Greg Chen, Mimi Mok, Lesley Ewen, Donald Fong, Nathan Fong, Dennis Foon, Tosca Chin Wah Leong, Estelle Coppens, Kevin Kelly, Gene Kiniski	
J U L Y	28	Kids	Vidmark Entertainment	Larry Clark (director); Harmony Korine (screenplay); Leo Fitzpatrick, Justin Pierce, Chloë Sevigny, Rosario Dawson, Yakira Peguero, Atabey Rodriguez, Jon Abrahams, Harold Hunter, Sajan Bhagat, Sarah Henderson, Tony Morales, Walter Youngblood, Julie Stebe-Glorius, Christina Stebe-Glorius, Harmony Korine	
J U L Y	28	The Net	Columbia Pictures	Irwin Winkler (director); John Brancato and Michael Ferris (screenplay); Sandra Bullock, Jeremy Northam, Dennis Miller, Diane Baker, Wendy Gazelle, Ken Howard, Ray McKinnon, Gerald Berns, Robert Gossett	
J U L Y	28	Operation Dumbo Drop	Walt Disney Pictures / Interscope Communications	Simon Wincer (director); Gene Quintano, Jim Kouf (screenplay); Danny Glover, Ray Liotta, Denis Leary, Doug E. Doug, Corin Nemec, Dinh Thien Le, James Hong, Tcheky Karyo, Hoang Ly, Vo Trung Anh, Marshall Bell, Tim Kelleher, Raymond Cruz, Tai	
J U L Y	28	Waterworld	Universal Pictures	Kevin Reynolds (director); Peter Rader, David Twohy (screenplay); Kevin Costner, Dennis Hopper, Jeanne Tripplehorn, Tina Majorino, Michael Jeter, Jack Black, Kim Coates, Robert Joy, Robert LaSardo, Gerard Murphy, R. D. Call, John Fleck, John Toles-Bey, Zakes Mokae, Sab Shimono, Leonardo Cimino, Zitto Kazann, Rick Aviles, Jack Kehler, Chris Douridas, Robert A. Silverman, Neil Giuntoli, William Preston, Sean Whalen, Lee Arenberg	
A U G U S T	4	Babe	Universal Pictures	Chris Noonan (director/screenplay); George Miller (screenplay); James Cromwell, Magda Szubanski, Brittany Byrnes, Wade Hayward, Paul Goddard, Zoe Burton, Christine Cavanaugh, Miriam Margolyes, Hugo Weaving, Danny Mann, Miriam Flynn, Russi Taylor, Roscoe Lee Browne, Paul Livingston, John Erwin, Doris Grau, Ross Bagley, Debi Derryberry, Courtland Mead, Jazz Raycole, Patrika Darbo, Julie Forsyth, Rosanna Huffman, Tina Lifford, Gennie Nevinson, Kerry Walker, Michael Edward-Stevens, Charles Bartlett, Evelyn Krape, Gemini Barnett, Rachel Davey, Kevin Jamal Woods, Jane Alden, Kimberly Bailey, Michelle Davison, Maeve Germaine, Carlyle King, Mary Linda Phillips, Paige Pollack	
A U G U S T	4	Bushwhacked	20th Century Fox	Greg Beeman (director); John Jordan, Danny Byers, Tommy Swerdlow, Michael Goldberg (screenplay); Daniel Stern, Jon Polito, Brad Sullivan, Ann Dowd, Anthony Heald, Tom Wood, Blake Bashoff, Corey Carrier, Michael Galeota, Michael P. Byrne, Natalie West, Max Goldblatt, Ari Greenberg, Janna Michaels, Michael O'Neill	
A U G U S T	4	Something to Talk About	Warner Bros. Pictures	Lasse Hallström (director); Callie Khouri (screenplay); Julia Roberts, Dennis Quaid, Robert Duvall, Gena Rowlands, Kyra Sedgwick, Brett Cullen, Muse Watson, Rhoda Griffis, J. Don Ferguson, Mary Nell Santacroce, David Huddleston, Terrence P. Currier, Rebecca Koon, Lisa Roberts, Deborah Hobart, Amy Parrish, Helen Baldwin, Libby Whittemore	
A U G U S T	4	Virtuosity	Paramount Pictures	Brett Leonard (director); Eric Bernt (screenplay); Denzel Washington, Russell Crowe, Kelly Lynch, Stephen Spinella, William Forsythe, Louise Fletcher, William Fichtner, Costas Mandylor, Kevin J. O'Connor, Kaley Cuoco, Christopher Murray, Mari Morrow, Heidi Schanz, Traci Lords, Michael Buffer, Michael B. Silver, Danny Goldring, Rolando Molina, Gary Anthony Sturgis, Monica Allison, Ahmed Ahmed, Dustin Nguyen, Una Damon, Alanna Ubach, Eric Bernt, Frank Welker, Ken Shamrock, Mathew St. Patrick, Johnny Kim, Gordon Jennison Noice	
A U G U S T	9	The Brothers McMullen	Fox Searchlight Pictures	Edward Burns (director/screenplay); Edward Burns, Mike McGlone, Jack Mulcahy, Connie Britton, Shari Albert, Maxine Bahns, Catherine Bolz, Peter Johansen, Jennifer Jostyn, Elizabeth McKay	
A U G U S T	11	Dangerous Minds	Hollywood Pictures / Don Simpson/Jerry Bruckheimer Films	John N. Smith (director); Ronald Bass (screenplay); Michelle Pfeiffer, George Dzundza, Courtney B. Vance, Robin Bartlett, Beatrice Winde, John Neville, Lorraine Toussaint, Renoly Santiago, Wade Dominguez, Bruklin Harris, Marcello Thedford, Karina Arroyave, Paula Garces, Ivan Sergei, Gaura Vani, Camille Winbush, Al Israel, Jeffrey Garcia	
A U G U S T	11	A Kid in King Arthur's Court	Walt Disney Pictures / Tapestry Films / Trimark Pictures	Michael Gottlieb (director); Michael Part, Robert L. Levy (screenplay); Thomas Ian Nicholas, Joss Ackland, Art Malik, Paloma Baeza, Kate Winslet, Daniel Craig, David Tysallas Ratan, Ron Moody, Barry Stanton, Michael Mehlnan, Melanie Oettinger, Rebecca Denton, Michael Kelly, Louise Rosner, Paul Rosner, Bela Unger, Shane Rimmer, Tim Wickham, Daniel Bennett, Debora Weston, Vincent Marzello, Catherine Blake, J. P. Guerin	
A U G U S T	11	Unzipped	Miramax Films	Douglas Keeve (director); Isaac Mizrahi, Linda Evangelista, Naomi Campbell, Cindy Crawford, Kate Moss, Roseanne Barr, Sandra Bernhard, Carla Bruni, Helena Christensen, Meghan Douglas, Faye Dunaway, John Galliano, Richard Gere, Yasmeen Ghauri, Michael Gross, Shalom Harlow, Tricia Helfer, Eartha Kitt, Padma Lakshmi, Claudia Mason, Polly Allen Mellen, Liza Minnelli, Karen Mulder, Eve Salvail, Kimora Lee Simmons, Shiraz Tal, André Leon Talley, Niki Taylor, Christy Turlington, Amber Valletta, Patricia Velasquez, Veronica Webb	
A U G U S T	11	A Walk in the Clouds	20th Century Fox	Alfonso Arau (director); Robert Mark Kamen, Mark Miller, Harvey Weitzman (screenplay); Keanu Reeves, Aitana Sánchez-Gijón, Giancarlo Giannini, Anthony Quinn, Angélica Aragón, Evangelina Elizondo, Freddy Rodriguez, Debra Messing, Febronio Covarrubias, Roberto Huerta, Juan Jimenez, Ismael Gallegos, Alejandra Flores, Gema Sandoval, Don Amendolia, Gregory Paul Martin	
A U G U S T	18	The Baby-Sitters Club	Columbia Pictures / Beacon Pictures	Melanie Mayron (director); Dalene Young (screenplay); Schuyler Fisk, Bre Blair, Tricia Joe, Rachael Leigh Cook, Larisa Oleynik, Christian Oliver, Stacy Linn Ramsower, Zelda Harris, Austin O'Brien, Ellen Burstyn, Vanessa Zima, Brooke Adams, Bruce Davison, Jess Needham, Peter Horton, Asher Metchik, Marla Sokoloff, Aaron Michael Metchik, Kyla Pratt, Scarlett Pomers	
A U G U S T	18	Mortal Kombat	New Line Cinema	Paul W. S. Anderson (director); Kevin Droney (screenplay); Robin Shou, Linden Ashby, Cary-Hiroyuki Tagawa, Bridgette Wilson, Talisa Soto, Christopher Lambert, Trevor Goddard, Chris Casamassa, Francois Petit, Keith Cooke, Tom Woodruff Jr., Kevin Michael Richardson, Steven Ho, Peter Jason, Frank Welker, Sandy Helberg, Gregory McKinney, Kenneth Edwards	
A U G U S T	25	The Amazing Panda Adventure	Warner Bros. Pictures	Christopher Cain (director); Jeff Rothberg, Lawrence Elehwany (screenplay); Stephen Lang, Ryan Slater, Brian Wagner, Yi Ding, Wang Fei, Lan Yu, Isabella Hofmann, Zhou Jian Zhong, Yao Er Ga	
A U G U S T	25	Beyond Rangoon	Columbia Pictures / Castle Rock Entertainment	John Boorman (director); Alex Lasker, Bill Rubenstein (screenplay); Patricia Arquette, Frances McDormand, U Aung Ko, Johnny Cheah, Adelle Lutz, Spalding Gray, Tiara Jacquelina, Victor Slezak, Hani Mohsin	
A U G U S T	25	Desperado	Columbia Pictures	Robert Rodriguez (director/screenplay); Antonio Banderas, Joaquim de Almeida, Salma Hayek, Steve Buscemi, Cheech Marin, Quentin Tarantino, Carlos Gomez, Tito Larriva, Angel Aviles, Danny Trejo, Abraham Verduzco, Carlos Gallardo, Albert Michel Jr., David Alvarado, Angela Lanza, Peter Marquardt, Consuelo Gomez	
A U G U S T	25	Closer to Home	Elibon Film Productions	Joseph Nobile (director); Joseph Nobile, Ruben Arthur Nicdao(screenplay); Madeline Ortaliz, John Michael Bolger, Vic Diaz, Joonee Gamboa, Jane Gabbart, Elizabeth Bracco, James Lorinz, Lou Veloso, Ching Valdes-Aran, Rey Ventura, Tony Mabasa, Ralph Buckley, Edward Lane, Connie Chua	
A U G U S T	25	Dr. Jekyll and Ms. Hyde	Savoy Pictures	David Price (director/screenplay); Tim Daly, Sean Young, Lysette Anthony, Stephen Tobolowsky, Harvey Fierstein, Thea Vidale, Jeremy Piven, Polly Bergen	
A U G U S T	25	Lord of Illusions	United Artists	Clive Barker (director/screenplay); Scott Bakula, Kevin J. O'Connor, Famke Janssen, J. Trevor Edmond, Daniel von Bargen, Joseph Latimore, Wayne Grace, Jordan Marder, Barry Del Sherman, Joel Swetow, Vincent Schiavelli	
A U G U S T	25	The Thief and the Cobbler	Miramax Films	Richard Williams (director/producer/screenplay); Vincent Price, Matthew Broderick, Jennifer Beals, Jonathan Winters, Clive Revill	
A U G U S T	26	The Tuskegee Airmen	HBO Pictures / Price Entertainment	Robert Markowitz (director); Paris Qualles, Trey Ellis, Ron Hutchinson, Robert Wayland Williams, T.S. Cook (screenplay); Laurence Fishburne, Allen Payne, Malcolm-Jamal Warner, Courtney B. Vance, Andre Braugher, Christopher McDonald, Daniel Hugh Kelly, John Lithgow, Cuba Gooding Jr., Mekhi Phifer, Christopher Bevins, Vivica A. Fox, Bennet Guillory, Tim Kelleher, Ed Lauter, Janet MacLachlan, Perry Moore, Rosemary Murphy, Marco Perella, William Earl Ray, Rick Snyder, Ned Vaughn, Graham Jarvis	
A U G U S T	30	Magic in the Water	TriStar Pictures	Rick Stevenson (director/screenplay); Icel Dobell Massey (screenplay); Mark Harmon, Joshua Jackson, Harley Jane Kozak, Sarah Wayne, Willie Nark-Orn, Adrien Dorval, Mark Acheson, Anthony Towe, John Procaccino	
S E P T E M B E R	1	The Prophecy	Dimension Films	Gregory Widen (director/screenplay); Christopher Walken, Elias Koteas, Virginia Madsen, Eric Stoltz, Viggo Mortensen, Amanda Plummer, Moriah Shining Dove Snyder, Adam Goldberg, Steve Hytner, J.C. Quinn, Jeff Cadiente, Patrick McAllister, Albert Nelson	
S E P T E M B E R	8	Last of the Dogmen	Savoy Pictures	Tab Murphy (director/screenplay); Tom Berenger, Barbara Hershey, Kurtwood Smith, Steve Reevis, Andrew Miller, Gregory Scott Cummins, Mark Boone Junior, Graham Jarvis, Parley Baer, Molly Parker, Antony Holland, Wilford Brimley	
S E P T E M B E R	8	National Lampoon's Senior Trip	New Line Cinema	Kelly Makin (director); Roger Kumble, I. Marlene King (screenplay); Matt Frewer, Valerie Mahaffey, Lawrence Dane, Tommy Chong, Jeremy Renner, Rob Moore, Eric "Sparky" Edwards, Kevin McDonald, Michael Blake, Tara Charendoff, Nicole de Boer, Sergio Di Zio, Fiona Loewi, Kathryn Rose, Danny Smith, Kay Tremblay, Wayne Robson, George R. Robertson, Rachel Wilson	
S E P T E M B E R	8	The Tie That Binds	Hollywood Pictures / Interscope Communications	Wesley Strick (director); Michael Auerbach (screenplay); Daryl Hannah, Keith Carradine, Vincent Spano, Moira Kelly, Julia Devin, Bruce A. Young, Cynda Williams, Ray Reinhardt, Barbara Tarbuck, Carmen Argenziano, Jenny Gago, Ned Vaughn, George Marshall Ruge	
S E P T E M B E R	8	To Wong Foo, Thanks for Everything! Julie Newmar	Universal Pictures / Amblin Entertainment	Beeban Kidron (director); Douglas Beane (screenplay); Wesley Snipes, Patrick Swayze, John Leguizamo, Stockard Channing, Blythe Danner, Arliss Howard, Jason London, Chris Penn, Melinda Dillon, Beth Grant, Alice Drummond, Michael Vartan, Jennifer Milmore, Julie Newmar, Naomi Campbell, Joseph Arias, Lady Catiria, Alexander Heimberg, Brendan McDanniel, Clinton Leupp, Steven Polito, Jon Ingle, Quentin Crisp, Jose Sarria, RuPaul, Robin Williams	
S E P T E M B E R	9	Truman	HBO Pictures	Frank Pierson (director); Thomas Rickman (screenplay); Gary Sinise, Diana Scarwid, Richard Dysart, Colm Feore, James Gammon, Tony Goldwyn, Pat Hingle, Harris Yulin, Leo Burmester, Amelia Campbell, Virginia Capers, John Finn, Željko Ivanek, David Lansbury, Remak Ramsay, Marian Seldes, Lois Smith, Richard Venture, Daniel von Bargen, Nora Denney, John Durbin, Wiley Harker, Lynn King, Holmes Osborne, Clement Attlee, James F. Byrnes, Winston Churchill, Thomas E. Dewey, Dwight D. Eisenhower, Averell Harriman, Toshikazu Kase, William D. Leahy, John L. Lewis, Douglas MacArthur, Georgi Malenkov, Joseph McCarthy, Vyacheslav Molotov, Michael Murphy, Richard Nixon, Pat Nixon, Lee Richardson, Franklin D. Roosevelt, James Roosevelt, Mamoru Shigemitsu, Joseph Stalin, John Stephenson, Harry S. Truman	
S E P T E M B E R	13	Clockers	Universal Pictures / 40 Acres and a Mule Filmworks	Spike Lee (director/screenplay); Richard Price (screenplay); Harvey Keitel, John Turturro, Delroy Lindo, Mekhi Phifer, Isaiah Washington, Keith David, Pee Wee Love, Regina Taylor, Thomas Jefferson Byrd, Sticky Fingaz, Fredro Starr, Elvis Nolasco, Lawrence B. Adisa, Hassan Johnson, Frances Foster, Michael Imperioli, Lisa Arrindell Anderson, Paul Calderon, Brendan Kelly, Mike Starr, Graham Brown, Steve White, Spike Lee, Arthur J. Nascarella, Harry Lennix, Paul Schulze, J.C. MacKenzie, Norman Matlock, Leonard L. Thomas, Michael Badalucco, Rick Aiello, Tim Kelleher, Skipp Sudduth, Jeff Ward	
S E P T E M B E R	15	Angus	New Line Cinema / Turner Pictures	Patrick Read Johnson (director); Jill Gordon (screenplay); Charlie Talbert, George C. Scott, Kathy Bates, Rita Moreno, Chris Owen, Lawrence Pressman, Ariana Richards, Anna Thomson, James Van Der Beek, Wesley Mann, Robert Curtis Brown, Kevin Connolly, Perry Anzilotti, Tony Denman, Yvette Freeman, Salim Grant, James Keane, Irvin Kershner, Lindsay Price, Aaron Siefers, Grant Hoover, Michael Wesley, Cameron Royds, Bryan Warloe, Bethany Richards, Steven Hartman, Michael McLeod, Tanner Lee Prairie	
S E P T E M B E R	15	Hackers	United Artists	Iain Softley (director); Rafael Moreu (screenplay); Jonny Lee Miller, Angelina Jolie, Fisher Stevens, Lorraine Bracco, Renoly Santiago, Matthew Lillard, Laurence Mason, Jesse Bradford, Alberta Watson, Penn Jillette, Wendell Pierce, Marc Anthony, Michael Gaston, Felicity Huffman	
S E P T E M B E R	15	Mute Witness	Sony Pictures Classics	Anthony Waller (director/screenplay); Alec Guinness, Marina Zudina, Fay Ripley, Evan Richards, Oleg Yankovsky, Igor Volkov, Sergei Karlenkov, NValeri Barakhtin, Sascha Buchman	
S E P T E M B E R	15	The Stars Fell on Henrietta	Warner Bros. Pictures	James Keach (director); Philip Railsback (screenplay); Robert Duvall, Aidan Quinn, Frances Fisher, Brian Dennehy, Billy Bob Thornton, Lexi Randall, Francesca Eastwood, Victor Wong, Paul Lazar, Spencer Garrett, Park Overall, Zach Grenier, Wayne Dehart, Rodger Boyce, Robert Westenberg, Richard Lineback, Dylan Baker, Rob Campbell, Tom Aldredge, Jerry Haynes, Robert A. Burns, Blue Deckert, Joe Stevens, Woody Watson, George Haynes, Landon Peterson, Cliff Stephens, Kaytlyn Knowles	
S E P T E M B E R	15	Unstrung Heroes	Hollywood Pictures	Diane Keaton (director); Richard LaGravenese (screenplay); Andie MacDowell, John Turturro, Michael Richards, Maury Chaykin, Nathan Watt, Celia Weston, Candice Azzara, Jack McGee, Giuseppe Andrews, Lillian Adams, Lou Cutell, Harold M. Schulweis, Becky Ann Baker, Julie Pinson, Zachary Bostrom, Ken Tipton, Kendra Krull, Zoaunne LeRoy, Vince Melocchi, Chris Warfield, Wayne Duvall, Thomas Brunelle, Joshua Boyd, Cody Dobson, Colleen Ford, Darcy French-Myerson, Danielle Judovits, Christie Mellor, Richard Marion, Ruth Silveira	
S E P T E M B E R	15	The Usual Suspects	Gramercy Pictures	Bryan Singer (director); Christopher McQuarrie (screenplay); Stephen Baldwin, Gabriel Byrne, Benicio del Toro, Chazz Palminteri, Kevin Pollak, Pete Postlethwaite, Kevin Spacey, Suzy Amis, Giancarlo Esposito, Peter Greene, Dan Hedaya, Paul Bartel, Christine Estabrook, Clark Gregg, Michelle Clunie, Louis Lombardi, Castulo Guerra, Christopher McQuarrie	
S E P T E M B E R	22	Canadian Bacon	Gramercy Pictures / PolyGram Filmed Entertainment / Propaganda Films	Michael Moore (director/screenplay); Alan Alda, John Candy, Rhea Perlman, Kevin J. O'Connor, Bill Nunn, Kevin Pollak, G. D. Spradlin, Rip Torn, Steven Wright, Jim Belushi, Richard E. Council, Brad Sullivan, Stanley Anderson, Wallace Shawn, Michael Moore, Dan Aykroyd, Ed Sahely	
S E P T E M B E R	22	Empire Records	Warner Bros. Pictures / Regency Enterprises	Allan Moyle (director); Carol Heikkinen (screenplay); Anthony LaPaglia, Maxwell Caulfield, Debi Mazar, Rory Cochrane, Johnny Whitworth, Robin Tunney, Renée Zellweger, Liv Tyler, Ethan Randall, Coyote Shivers, Brendan Sexton, James 'Kimo' Wills, Ben Bode, Gwar	
S E P T E M B E R	22	The Return of the Texas Chainsaw Massacre	Columbia TriStar Pictures	Kim Henkel (director/screenplay); Matthew McConaughey, Renée Zellweger, Robert Jacks, Tonie Perensky, John Harrison	
S E P T E M B E R	22	A Month by the Lake	Miramax Films	John Irvin (director); Trevor Bentham (screenplay); Vanessa Redgrave, Edward Fox, Uma Thurman, Alida Valli, Alessandro Gassman	
S E P T E M B E R	22	The Run of the Country	Columbia Pictures / Castle Rock Entertainment	Peter Yates (director); Shane Connaughton (screenplay); Albert Finney, Matt Keeslar, Victoria Smurfit, Anthony Brophy, David Kelly, Shaney McPhillips	
S E P T E M B E R	22	Seven	New Line Cinema	David Fincher (director); Andrew Kevin Walker (screenplay); Brad Pitt, Morgan Freeman, Gwyneth Paltrow, R. Lee Ermey, Richard Roundtree, Richard Schiff, Mark Boone Junior, Michael Massee, Leland Orser, John C. McGinley, Hawthorne James, Reg E. Cathey, Kevin Spacey, Julie Araskog	
S E P T E M B E R	22	Showgirls	United Artists / Carolco Pictures	Paul Verhoeven (director); Joe Eszterhas (screenplay); Elizabeth Berkley, Kyle MacLachlan, Gina Gershon, Glenn Plummer, Robert Davi, Alan Rachins, Gina Ravera, Lin Tucci, Greg Travis, Al Ruscio, Patrick Bristow, William Shockley, Dewey Weber, Rena Riffel, Melissa Williams, Ungela Brockman, Melinda Songer, Bobbie Phillips, Carrie Ann Inaba	
S E P T E M B E R	27	Persuasion	Sony Pictures Classics	Roger Michell (director); Nick Dear (screenplay); Amanda Root, Ciaran Hinds, Susan Fleetwood, Corin Redgrave, Fiona Shaw, John Woodvine, Phoebe Nicholls, Samuel West, Sophie Thompson, Judy Cornwell, Simon Russell Beale, Felicity Dean, Roger Hammond, Emma Roberts, Victoria Hamilton, Robert Glenister, Richard McCabe, Helen Schlesinger, Jane Wood, David Collings, Darlene Johnson, Cinnamon Faye, Isaac Maxwell-Hunt, Roger Llewellyn, Sally George	
S E P T E M B E R	29	The Big Green	Walt Disney Pictures / Caravan Pictures	Holly Goldberg Sloan (director/screenplay); Steve Guttenberg, Olivia d'Abo, Jay O. Sanders, John Terry, Chauncey Leopardi, Patrick Renna, Yareli Arizmendi, Bug Hall, Jordan Brower, Libby Villari, Billy L. Sullivan, Jessica Robertson, Anthony Esquivel, Hayley Kolb, Haley Miller, Ashley Welch, Ariel Welch, Jimmy Higa	
S E P T E M B E R	29	Devil in a Blue Dress	TriStar Pictures	Carl Franklin (director/screenplay); Denzel Washington, Tom Sizemore, Jennifer Beals, Don Cheadle, Maury Chaykin, Terry Kinney, Mel Winkler, Albert Hall, Lisa Nicole Carson, John Roselius, Beau Starr, L. Scott Caldwell, Barry Shabaka Henley, Renee Humphrey, Poppy Montgomery, Peggy Rea, Deborah Lacey, Jeris Lee Poindexter, John David Washington, Jernard Burks, David Wolos-Fonteno, Nicky Corell, Joseph Latimore	
S E P T E M B E R	29	Halloween: The Curse of Michael Myers	Dimension Films	Joe Chappelle (director); Daniel Farrands (screenplay); Donald Pleasence, Paul Rudd, Marianne Hagan, Mitchell Ryan, George P. Wilbur, J.C. Brandy, Mariah O'Brien, Kim Darby, Bradford English, Susan Swift, Janice Knickrehm, Devin Gardner, Keith Bogart, Leo Geter, Alan Echeverria, A. Michael Lerner	
S E P T E M B E R	29	Moonlight and Valentino	Gramercy Pictures / PolyGram Filmed Entertainment	David Anspaugh (director); Ellen Simon (screenplay); Elizabeth Perkins, Gwyneth Paltrow, Kathleen Turner, Whoopi Goldberg, Jon Bon Jovi, Peter Coyote, Jeremy Sisto, Josef Sommer, Shadia Simmons, Erica Luttrell, Judah Katz, Julian Richings	
S E P T E M B E R	29	Steal Big Steal Little	Savoy Pictures	Andrew Davis (director/screenplay); Andy Garcia, Alan Arkin, Rachel Ticotin, Joe Pantoliano, Holland Taylor, Ally Walker, David Ogden Stiers, Charles Rocket, Richard Bradford, Kevin McCarthy, Nathan Davis, Dominik García-Lorido, Mike Nussbaum, Rita Taggart, Takaaki Ishibashi, Tom Wood, Natalia Nogulich, Andy Romano, Renée Victor, Adam James, Candice Daly, Karen Kondazian, Ron Dean, Jack Wallace, Duane Davis, Lee de Broux, Robert Lesser, Frank Ray Perilli	

== October–December ==
Opening		Title	Production company	Cast and crew	Ref.
O C T O B E R	4	Dead Presidents	Hollywood Pictures / Caravan Pictures	Albert Hughes, Allen Hughes (directors/screenplay); Michael Henry Brown (screenplay); Larenz Tate, Keith David, Chris Tucker, N'Bushe Wright, Freddy Rodriguez, Bokeem Woodbine, Rose Jackson, Alvaleta Guess, James Pickens Jr., Jenifer Lewis, Michael Imperioli, Clifton Powell, Elizabeth Rodriguez, Terrence Howard, Jaimz Woolvett, Larry McCoy, Martin Sheen, Isaiah Washington	
O C T O B E R	6	Assassins	Warner Bros. Pictures / Silver Pictures	Richard Donner (director); Brian Helgeland, Lilly Wachowski, Lana Wachowski (screenplay); Sylvester Stallone, Antonio Banderas, Julianne Moore, Anatoly Davydov, Muse Watson, Steve Kahan, Kai Wulff, Mark Coates, Kelly Rowan, Reed Diamond	
O C T O B E R	6	The Horseman on the Roof	Miramax Films	Jean-Paul Rappeneau (director/screenplay); Jean-Claude Carrière, Nina Companéez (screenplay); Juliette Binoche, Olivier Martinez, Pierre Arditi, François Cluzet, Jean Yanne, Claudio Amendola, Isabelle Carré, Carlo Cecchi, Christiane Cohendy, Yolande Moreau, Daniel Russo, Paul Freeman, Richard Sammel, Jean-Marie Winling, Hervé Pierre, Élisabeth Margoni, Gérard Depardieu, Nathalie Krebs, Laura Marinoni, Christophe Odent	
O C T O B E R	6	How to Make an American Quilt	Universal Pictures / Amblin Entertainment	Jocelyn Moorhouse (director); Jane Anderson (screenplay); Winona Ryder, Anne Bancroft, Ellen Burstyn, Kate Nelligan, Alfre Woodard, Maya Angelou, Claire Danes, Samantha Mathis, Lois Smith, Jean Simmons, Kate Capshaw, Loren Dean, Dermot Mulroney, Derrick O'Connor, Rip Torn, Mykelti Williamson, Jared Leto, Adam Baldwin, Johnathon Schaech, Richard Jenkins, Joanna Going, Lecy Goranson, Tim Guinee, Denis Arndt, Tamala Jones	
O C T O B E R	6	Kicking and Screaming	Trimark Pictures	Noah Baumbach (director/screenplay); Josh Hamilton, Olivia d'Abo, Chris Eigeman, Parker Posey, Jason Wiles, Cara Buono, Carlos Jacott, Elliott Gould, Eric Stoltz, Marissa Ribisi, Dean Cameron, Perrey Reeves, Noah Baumbach	
O C T O B E R	6	Not This Part of the World	Downhouse Productions	Phil Atlakson (director/screenplay); Adam West, Matt Letscher, Christina Lang, Arthur Glen Hughes, Ashley Martell, Travis Swartz, Tom Willmorth, Randy Davison, Richard Klautsch, Joe Golden	
O C T O B E R	6	To Die For	Columbia Pictures	Gus Van Sant (director); Buck Henry (screenplay); Nicole Kidman, Joaquin Phoenix, Matt Dillon, Alison Folland, Casey Affleck, Illeana Douglas, Dan Hedaya, Maria Tucci, Wayne Knight, Kurtwood Smith, Holland Taylor, Susan Traylor, Tim Hopper, Michael Rispoli, Buck Henry, Gerry Quigley, David Cronenberg, Joyce Maynard, Chris Phillips, George Segal, Rain Phoenix	
O C T O B E R	13	Blue in the Face	Miramax Films	Paul Auster, Wayne Wang (directors/screenplay); Harvey Keitel, Victor Argo, Keith David, Giancarlo Esposito, Michael J. Fox, Mel Gorham, Jared Harris, Jim Jarmusch, Madonna, Lou Reed, Roseanne Barr, Mira Sorvino, Lily Tomlin, Malik Yoba, RuPaul, José Zúñiga, Michael Badalucco, Michelle Hurst, Debra Wilson	
O C T O B E R	13	Feast of July	Touchstone Pictures / Merchant Ivory Productions	Christopher Menaul (director); Christopher Neame (screenplay); Embeth Davidtz, Tom Bell, Gemma Jones, James Purefoy, Greg Wise, Ben Chaplin, David Neal, Tim Preece, Charles De'Ath, Colin Prockter, Richard Hope, Colin Mayes, Tom Marshall, Kenneth Anderson, Daphne Neville, Frederick Warder	
O C T O B E R	13	Jade	Paramount Pictures	William Friedkin (director); Joe Eszterhas (screenplay); David Caruso, Linda Fiorentino, Chazz Palminteri, Michael Biehn, Richard Crenna, Angie Everhart, Holt McCallany, Ken King, Donna Murphy, Kevin Tighe, Victor Wong, David Hunt, Robin Thomas, Victoria Smith, Drew Snyder, Darryl Chan, Buddy Joe Hooker, Bobby Bass, Kenneth Tigar, Ron Yuan, Peter Duchin	
O C T O B E R	13	The Scarlet Letter	Hollywood Pictures / Cinergi Pictures	Roland Joffé (director); Douglas Day Stewart (screenplay); Demi Moore, Gary Oldman, Robert Duvall, Robert Prosky, Edward Hardwicke, Joan Plowright, Lisa Joliffe-Andoh, Roy Dotrice, Larissa Laskin, Amy Wright, George Aguilar, Tim Woodward, Dana Ivey, Sheldon Peters Wolfchild, Eric Schweig, Kristin Fairlie, Sarah Campbell, Kennetch Charlette, Jodhi May	
O C T O B E R	13	Strange Days	20th Century Fox / Lightstorm Entertainment	Kathryn Bigelow (director); James Cameron, Jay Cocks (screenplay); Ralph Fiennes, Angela Bassett, Juliette Lewis, Tom Sizemore, Vincent D'Onofrio, Michael Wincott, Brigitte Bako, William Fichtner, Glenn Plummer, Richard Edson, Josef Sommer, Louise Lecavalier	
O C T O B E R	14	The Affair	HBO Pictures / Black Tuesday Films	Paul Seed (director); Pablo Fenjves, Bryan Goluboff (screenplay); Courtney B. Vance, Kerry Fox, Leland Gantt, Ned Beatty, Bill Nunn, Ciarán Hinds, Beatie Edney, Fraser James, Adrian Lester, Rory Jennings, Nicholas Selby, Anna Cropper, Rolf Saxon, Todd Boyce, Michael Shannon, Martin McDougall, William Russell, William Roberts	
O C T O B E R	20	Get Shorty	Metro-Goldwyn-Mayer / Jersey Films	Barry Sonnenfeld (director); Scott Frank (screenplay); John Travolta, Gene Hackman, Rene Russo, Danny DeVito, Dennis Farina, Delroy Lindo, James Gandolfini, David Paymer, Martin Ferrero, Miguel Sandoval, Jon Gries, Linda Hart, Renee Props, Jacob Vargas, Bette Midler, Bobby Slayton, Ron Karabatsos, Jack Conley, Bernard Hocke, Vito Scotti, Rino Piccolo, Alfred Dennis, Ralph Manza, Patrick Breen, Barry Sonnenfeld, Rebeca Arthur, Leslie Bega, Marlene Dietrich, David Groh, Charlton Heston, Harvey Keitel, David Letterman, Penny Marshall, Dean Martin, Alex Rocco, John Wayne, Orson Welles	
O C T O B E R	20	Mallrats	Universal Pictures / Alphaville Films	Kevin Smith (director/screenplay); Shannen Doherty, Jeremy London, Jason Lee, Claire Forlani, Ben Affleck, Joey Lauren Adams, Renee Humphrey, Jason Mewes, Kevin Smith, Ethan Suplee, Priscilla Barnes, Michael Rooker, Sven-Ole Thorsen, Scott Mosier, Walt Flanagan, Bryan Johnson, Brian O'Halloran, Art James, Stan Lee	
O C T O B E R	20	Never Talk to Strangers	TriStar Pictures	Peter Hall (director); Lewis Green, Jordan Rush (screenplay); Rebecca De Mornay, Antonio Banderas, Dennis Miller, Len Cariou, Harry Dean Stanton, Eugene Lipinski, Martha Burns, Beau Starr, Phillip Jarrett, Tim Kelleher	
O C T O B E R	20	Now and Then	New Line Cinema / Moving Pictures	Lesli Linka Glatter (director); I. Marlene King (screenplay); Christina Ricci, Thora Birch, Gaby Hoffmann, Ashleigh Aston Moore, Melanie Griffith, Demi Moore, Rosie O'Donnell, Rita Wilson, Cloris Leachman, Janeane Garofalo, Hank Azaria, Bonnie Hunt, Devon Sawa, Walter Sparrow, Lolita Davidovich, Rumer Willis, Ric Reitz, Brendan Fraser, Brandon Kleyla, Dave Thompson, Bradley Coryell, Justin Humphrey, Travis Robertson	
O C T O B E R	27	Copycat	Warner Bros. Pictures / Regency Enterprises	Jon Amiel (director); Ann Biderman, David Madsen (screenplay); Sigourney Weaver, Holly Hunter, Dermot Mulroney, Harry Connick Jr., William McNamara, Will Patton, John Rothman, J.E. Freeman, Shannon O'Hurley	
O C T O B E R	27	The Doom Generation	Trimark Pictures	Gregg Araki (director/screenplay); Rose McGowan, James Duval, Johnathon Schaech, Cress Williams, Skinny Puppy, Dustin Nguyen, Margaret Cho, Lauren Tewes, Christopher Knight, Nicky Katt, Perry Farrell, Amanda Bearse, Parker Posey, Heidi Fleiss, Don Galloway, Dewey Weber, Khristofor Rossianov	
O C T O B E R	27	Leaving Las Vegas	United Artists	Mike Figgis (director/screenplay); Nicolas Cage, Elisabeth Shue, Julian Sands, Richard Lewis, Steven Weber, Emily Procter, Valeria Golino, Thomas Kopache, Laurie Metcalf, French Stewart, R. Lee Ermey, Mariska Hargitay, Julian Lennon, Graham Beckel, Albert Henderson, Carey Lowell, Vincent Ward, Lucinda Jenney, Ed Lauter, Mike Figgis, Danny Huston, Shawnee Smith, Bob Rafelson, Marc Coppola, Michael Goorjian, Jeremy Jordan, Xander Berkeley, Lou Rawls	
O C T O B E R	27	Mighty Aphrodite	Miramax Films	Woody Allen (director/screenplay); Woody Allen, Mira Sorvino, Helena Bonham Carter, Michael Rapaport, F. Murray Abraham, Olympia Dukakis, David Ogden Stiers, Jack Warden, Danielle Ferland, Peter Weller, Claire Bloom	
O C T O B E R	27	Powder	Hollywood Pictures / Caravan Pictures	Victor Salva (director/screenplay); Sean Patrick Flanery, Mary Steenburgen, Lance Henriksen, Jeff Goldblum, Brandon Smith, Bradford Tatum, Susan Tyrrell, Missy Crider, Ray Wise, Esteban Powell, Reed Frerichs, Chad Cox, Joe Marchman, Phil Hayes, Danette McMahon	
O C T O B E R	27	Three Wishes	Savoy Pictures	Martha Coolidge (director); Patrick Green, Elizabeth Anderson (screenplay); Patrick Swayze, Mary Elizabeth Mastrantonio, Joseph Mazzello, David Marshall Grant, Jay O. Sanders, Michael O'Keefe, John Diehl, Diane Venora, Seth Mumy, Brock Pierce, David Hart, Scott Patterson, Annabelle Gurwitch, Moira Harris, Neal McDonough, Bill Mumy, Colleen Camp, Garette Ratliff Henson, Loanne Bishop, Michael Wong, D.B. Sweeney	
O C T O B E R	27	Vampire in Brooklyn	Paramount Pictures	Wes Craven (director); Charles Murphy, Michael Lucker, Chris Parker (screenplay); Eddie Murphy, Angela Bassett, Allen Payne, Kadeem Hardison, John Witherspoon, Zakes Mokae, Joanna Cassidy, Simbi Khali, Nick Corri, W. Earl Brown, Vickilyn Reynolds, Marcelo Tubert, Jerry Hall, Wendy Robie, Oren Waters, Carmen Twillie, Ray Combs, Mitch Pileggi, Ken Tipton	
N O V E M B E R	3	Fair Game	Warner Bros. Pictures / Silver Pictures	Andrew Sipes (director); Charlie Fletcher (screenplay); William Baldwin, Cindy Crawford, Steven Berkoff, Christopher McDonald, Miguel Sandoval, Johann Carlo, Salma Hayek, John Bedford Lloyd, Jenette Goldstein, Paul Dillon, Olek Krupa, Gustav Vintas, Marc Macaulay, Dan Hedaya	
N O V E M B E R	3	Gold Diggers: The Secret of Bear Mountain	Universal Pictures	Kevin James Dobson (director); Barry Glasser (screenplay); Christina Ricci, Anna Chlumsky, Polly Draper, Brian Kerwin, Diana Scarwid, David Keith, Ashleigh Aston Moore, Jewel Staite, Roger Cross, Jesse Moss, Jennifer Hale	
N O V E M B E R	3	Home for the Holidays	Paramount Pictures / PolyGram Filmed Entertainment	Jodie Foster (director); W. D. Richter (screenplay); Holly Hunter, Robert Downey Jr., Claire Danes, Anne Bancroft, Charles Durning, Dylan McDermott, Austin Pendleton, Geraldine Chaplin, Steve Guttenberg, Cynthia Stevenson, David Strathairn, Emily Ann Lloyd, Zach Duhame	
N O V E M B E R	3	Total Eclipse	Fine Line Features	Agnieszka Holland (director); Christopher Hampton (screenplay); Leonardo DiCaprio, David Thewlis, Romane Bohringer, Dominique Blanc, James Thierree, Andrzej Seweryn, Christopher Thompson, Christopher Chaplin, Christopher Hampton, Mathias Jung	
N O V E M B E R	10	Ace Ventura: When Nature Calls	Warner Bros. Pictures / Morgan Creek Productions	Steve Oedekerk (director/screenplay); Jim Carrey, Ian McNeice, Simon Callow, Maynard Eziashi, Bob Gunton, Damon Standifer, Sophie Okonedo, Arsenio 'Sonny' Trinidad, Danny D. Daniels, Andrew Steel, Bruce Spence, Adewale Akinnuoye-Agbaje, Tommy Davidson, Michael Reid McKay	
N O V E M B E R	10	Carrington	Gramercy Pictures / PolyGram Filmed Entertainment	Christopher Hampton (director/screenplay); Emma Thompson, Jonathan Pryce, Steven Waddington, Rufus Sewell, Samuel West, Penelope Wilton, Janet McTeer, Peter Blythe, Jeremy Northam, Alex Kingston, Sebastian Harcombe, Richard Clifford, David Ryall, Stephen Boxer, Annabel Mullion	
N O V E M B E R	10	The Journey of August King	Miramax Films	John Duigan (director); John Ehle (screenplay); Jason Patric, Thandie Newton, Larry Drake, Sam Waterston, Eric Mabius, Muse Watson, John Doman, Andrew Stahl, Collin Wilcox-Paxton, Dale Dickey, Lee Norris, Maya Angelou, Sarah-Jane Wylde, Danny Nelson, Dean Rader Duvall, Billy Ray Reynolds, Marlus C. Harding, Lisa Roberts, John Burnett Hall, Roy Bush Laughter, A. Duncan Shirley III, Chase Conley, Nesbitt Blaisdell, Graham Paul, Rich Valliere, Mitch Mulkey, Ken Paul Jones, Dean Whitworth, Blaque Fowler, Mark Joy	
N O V E M B E R	15	Reckless	The Samuel Goldwyn Company	Norman René (director); Craig Lucas (screenplay); Mia Farrow, Scott Glenn, Mary-Louise Parker, Tony Goldwyn, Eileen Brennan, Giancarlo Esposito, Stephen Dorff, Debra Monk, William Fichtner, Nancy Marchand, Zach Grenier, Jack Gilpin, William Duell, Deborah Rush, Mary Beth Peil	
N O V E M B E R	16	The Crossing Guard	Miramax Films	Sean Penn (director/screenplay); Jack Nicholson, David Morse, Anjelica Huston, Robin Wright Penn, Piper Laurie, Richard Bradford, Priscilla Barnes, David Baerwald, Robbie Robertson, John Savage, Kari Wuhrer, Kellita Smith, Richard Sarafian, Joe Viterelli	
N O V E M B E R	17	The American President	Columbia Pictures / Castle Rock Entertainment	Rob Reiner (director); Aaron Sorkin (screenplay); Michael Douglas, Annette Bening, Martin Sheen, Michael J. Fox, Samantha Mathis, John Mahoney, Richard Dreyfuss, David Paymer, Anna Deavere Smith, Nina Siemaszko, Wendie Malick, Shawna Waldron, Anne Haney, Beau Billingslea, Gail Strickland, Joshua Malina	
N O V E M B E R	17	GoldenEye	United Artists	Martin Campbell (director); Michael France, Jeffrey Caine, Kevin Wade, Bruce Feirstein (screenplay); Pierce Brosnan, Sean Bean, Izabella Scorupco, Famke Janssen, Joe Don Baker, Judi Dench, Gottfried John, Robbie Coltrane, Alan Cumming, Tcheky Karyo, Desmond Llewelyn, Samantha Bond, Michael Kitchen, Billy J. Mitchell, Minnie Driver, Serena Gordon, Simon Kunz, Pavel Douglas, Constantine Gregory, Michelle Arthur, Ravil Isyanov, Martin Campbell, Simon Crane, Max Faulkner, Michael G. Wilson	
N O V E M B E R	17	It Takes Two	Warner Bros. Pictures / Rysher Entertainment	Andy Tennant (director); Deborah Dean Davis (screenplay); Kirstie Alley, Steve Guttenberg, Mary-Kate Olsen, Ashley Olsen, Philip Bosco, Jane Sibbett, Ernie Grunwald, Ellen-Ray Hennessy, Dov Tiefenbach, Michelle Grisom, Desmond Robertson, Tiny Mills, Shanelle Henry, Anthony Aiello, La Tonya Borsay, Michelle Lonsdale-Smith, Sean Orr, Elizabeth Walsh, Paul O'Sullivan, Lawrence Dane, Gerrard Parkes, Gina Clayton, Doug O'Keefe, Marilyn Boyle, Annick Obonsawin, Austin Pool, Andre Lorant, Vito Rezza	
N O V E M B E R	22	Casino	Universal Pictures	Martin Scorsese (director/screenplay); Nicholas Pileggi (screenplay); Robert De Niro, Sharon Stone, Joe Pesci, James Woods, Frank Vincent, L. Q. Jones, Kevin Pollak, Alan King, Don Rickles, Pasquale Cajano, John Bloom, Dick Smothers, Philip Suriano, Bill Allison, Vinny Vella, Frankie Avalon, Steve Allen, Jayne Meadows, Jerry Vale, Joseph Rigano, Catherine Scorsese, Oscar Goodman, Paul Herman, Nobu Matsuhisa, Richard Riehle, Carl Ciarfalio, Claudia Haro, Alfonso Gomez-Rejon, Steve Schirripa, Dick Warlock	
N O V E M B E R	22	Frankie Starlight	Fine Line Features	Michael Lindsay-Hogg (director); Ronan O'Leary, Chet Raymo (screenplay); Anne Parillaud, Gabriel Byrne, Matt Dillon, Corbin Walker, Alan Pentony, Niall Tóibín, Georgina Cates, Dearbhla Molloy, John S. Davies, Barbara Alyn Woods, Jessie-Ann Friend, Rudi Davies, Colin Farrell	
N O V E M B E R	22	Last Summer in the Hamptons	Rainbow Releasing / Live Entertainment	Henry Jaglom (director/screenplay); Victoria Foyt (screenplay); Victoria Foyt, Viveca Lindfors, Jon Robin Baitz, Melissa Leo, Martha Plimpton, Andre Gregory, Roddy McDowall, Holland Taylor, Ron Rifkin, Brooke Smith, Roscoe Lee Browne, Kristoffer Tabori, Savannah Smith Boucher, Diane Salinger, Nick Gregory	
N O V E M B E R	22	Money Train	Columbia Pictures / Peters Entertainment	Joseph Ruben (director); Doug Richardson, David Loughery (screenplay); Wesley Snipes, Woody Harrelson, Robert Blake, Jennifer Lopez, Chris Cooper, Joe Grifasi, Scott Sowers, Skipp Sudduth, Vincent Laresca, Aida Turturro, Vincent Pastore, Enrico Colantoni, Dean Norris, José Zúñiga, Thomas G. Waites, Bill Nunn, Larry Gilliard Jr., Flex Alexander	
N O V E M B E R	22	Nick of Time	Paramount Pictures	John Badham (director); Patrick Sheane Duncan (screenplay); Johnny Depp, Christopher Walken, Courtney Chase, Charles S. Dutton, Roma Maffia, Marsha Mason, Peter Strauss, Gloria Reuben, G. D. Spradlin, Bill Smitrovich, Yul Vazquez, Edith Diaz	
N O V E M B E R	22	Toy Story	Walt Disney Pictures / Pixar Animation Studios	John Lasseter (director); Joel Cohen, Alec Sokolow, Andrew Stanton, Joss Whedon (screenplay); Tom Hanks, Tim Allen, Don Rickles, Jim Varney, Wallace Shawn, John Ratzenberger, Annie Potts, John Morris, Erik von Detten, Laurie Metcalf, R. Lee Ermey, Sarah Freeman, Penn Jillette, Jack Angel, Greg Berg, Debi Derryberry, Bill Farmer, Sherry Lynn, Scott McAfee, Mickie McGowan, Ryan O'Donohue, Jeff Pidgeon, Patrick Pinney, Phil Proctor, Jan Rabson, Joe Ranft, Andrew Stanton, Shane Sweet, Bob Bergen, Rodger Bumpass, Jennifer Darling, Paul Eiding, Holly Gauthier-Frankel, Arthur Holden, John Lasseter, Clarence Nash, Ernie Sabella, Kath Soucie, Sheb Wooley	
N O V E M B E R	22	Two Bits	Miramax Films	James Foley (director); Joseph Stefano (screenplay); Jerry Barone, Mary Elizabeth Mastrantonio, Al Pacino, Patrick Borriello, Andy Romano, Donna Mitchell, Mary Lou Rosato, Joe Grifasi, Rosemary De Angelis, Ron McLarty, Charley Scalies, Joanna Merlin, Geoff Pierson	
N O V E M B E R	25	Sugartime	HBO Pictures / Pacific Western	John N. Smith (director); Martyn Burke (screenplay); John Turturro, Mary-Louise Parker, Elias Koteas, Maury Chaykin, Louis Del Grande, Deborah Duchene, Larissa Laskin, Amanda Blitz, Renessa Blitz, Kelly Bodanis, Bob Clout, Stuart Clow, Bill Cross, Reg Dreger, Greg Ellwand, Ron Gabriel, Carole Galloway, Yamit Geiger, Sam Grana, Howard Jerome, Nahanni Johnstone, Patrick Jude, David Keeley, Deborah Kirshenbaum, John Kozak, Peter Krantz, Corinne Langston, Adam Large, John Lefebvre, Vincent Marino, Robin McCulloch, Gerry Mendicino, Tony Munch, Michael Rhoades, Nicholas Rice, Rino Romano, Tony Rosato, Chuck Shamata, Ralph Small, Jonathan Whittaker	
D E C E M B E R	1	Things to Do in Denver When You're Dead	Miramax Films	Gary Fleder (director); Scott Rosenberg (screenplay); Andy García, Christopher Lloyd, William Forsythe, Bill Nunn, Treat Williams, Steve Buscemi, Gabrielle Anwar, Christopher Walken, Jack Warden, Fairuza Balk, Michael Nicolosi, Bill Cobbs, Marshall Bell, Glenn Plummer, Don Stark, Willie Garson, Jenny McCarthy, Buddy Guy, Josh Charles, Sarah Trigger, Don Cheadle, Tommy "Tiny" Lister Jr., Wiley Harker, Bill Bolender, Bill Erwin	
D E C E M B E R	1	White Man's Burden	Savoy Pictures	Desmond Nakano (director/screenplay); John Travolta, Harry Belafonte, Kelly Lynch, Margaret Avery, Tom Bower, Andrew Lawrence, Bumper Robinson, Tom Wright, Sheryl Lee Ralph, Robert Gossett, Tom Nolan, Willie C. Carpenter, Michael Beach, Carrie Snodgress	
D E C E M B E R	1	Wild Bill	United Artists / The Zanuck Company	Walter Hill (director/screenplay); Jeff Bridges, Ellen Barkin, John Hurt, Diane Lane, Keith Carradine, Christina Applegate, Bruce Dern, James Gammon, David Arquette, Marjoe Gortner, James Remar, Steve Reevis, Pato Hoffmann, Dennis Hayden, Peter Jason, Lee de Broux	
D E C E M B E R	8	Father of the Bride Part II	Touchstone Pictures	Charles Shyer (director); Albert Hackett, Frances Goodrich (screenplay); Steve Martin, Diane Keaton, Martin Short, Kimberly Williams-Paisley, George Newbern, Kieran Culkin, BD Wong, Eugene Levy, Peter Michael Goetz, Kate McGregor-Stewart, Jay Wolpert	
D E C E M B E R	8	Georgia	Miramax Films	Ulu Grosbard (director); Barbara Turner (screenplay); Jennifer Jason Leigh, Mare Winningham, Ted Levine, Max Perlich, John Doe, John C. Reilly, Tom Bower, Jimmy Witherspoon, Jason Carter, Smokey Hormel, Jimmy Z, Jo Miller, Tony Marsico, Jamian Briar, Rachel Rasco, Nicole Donahoo	
D E C E M B E R	13	Sense and Sensibility	Columbia Pictures	Ang Lee (director); Emma Thompson (screenplay); Emma Thompson, Kate Winslet, Alan Rickman, Hugh Grant, Imogen Stubbs, Greg Wise, Gemma Jones, Harriet Walter, James Fleet, Hugh Laurie, Imelda Staunton, Robert Hardy, Elisabeth Spriggs, Tom Wilkinson	
D E C E M B E R	15	Heat	Warner Bros. Pictures / Regency Enterprises	Michael Mann (director/screenplay); Al Pacino, Robert De Niro, Val Kilmer, Tom Sizemore, Diane Venora, Amy Brenneman, Ashley Judd, Mykelti Williamson, Wes Studi, Ted Levine, Jon Voight, Hank Azaria, Dennis Haysbert, William Fichtner, Natalie Portman, Tom Noonan, Kevin Gage, Susan Traylor, Danny Trejo	
D E C E M B E R	15	Jumanji	TriStar Pictures	Joe Johnston (director); Jonathan Hensleigh, Greg Taylor, Jim Strain (screenplay); Robin Williams, Kirsten Dunst, Bradley Pierce, David Alan Grier, Bonnie Hunt, Jonathan Hyde, Bebe Neuwirth, Adam Hann-Byrd, James Handy, Patricia Clarkson, Laura Bell Bundy, Malcolm Stewart, Gillian Barber, Frank Welker, Tom Woodruff Jr.	
D E C E M B E R	15	Othello	Columbia Pictures / Castle Rock Entertainment	Oliver Parker (director/screenplay); Laurence Fishburne, Irène Jacob, Kenneth Branagh, Nathaniel Parker, Michael Maloney, Anna Patrick, Nicholas Farrell, Indra Ové, Michael Sheen, André Oumansky, Philip Locke, John Savident, Gabriele Ferzetti, Pierre Vaneck	
D E C E M B E R	15	Sabrina	Paramount Pictures	Sydney Pollack (director); Barbara Benedek, David Rayfiel (screenplay); Harrison Ford, Julia Ormond, Greg Kinnear, Nancy Marchand, Lauren Holly, Richard Crenna, Angie Dickinson, John Wood, Dana Ivey, Fanny Ardant, Valérie Lemercier, Paul Giamatti, Elizabeth Franz, Miriam Colon, Patrick Bruel, Becky Ann Baker, Margo Martindale, J. Smith-Cameron, Phina Oruche	
D E C E M B E R	19	Magic Island	Paramount Pictures	Sam Irvin (director); Neil Ruttenberg, Brent V. Friedman (screenplay); Zachery Ty Bryan, Andrew Divoff, Edward Kerr, Lee Armstrong, French Stewart, Jessie-Ann Friend, Oscar Dillon, Abraham Benrubi, Sean O'Kane, Schae Harrison, Ja'net Dubois	
D E C E M B E R	20	Nixon	Hollywood Pictures / Cinergi Pictures / Illusion Entertainment Group	Oliver Stone (director/screenplay); Stephen J. Rivele, Christopher Wilkinson (screenplay); Anthony Hopkins, Joan Allen, Powers Boothe, Ed Harris, Bob Hoskins, E.G. Marshall, David Paymer, David Hyde Pierce, Paul Sorvino, Mary Steenburgen, James Woods, J.T. Walsh, Larry Hagman, Madeline Kahn, Kevin Dunn, Annabeth Gish, Marley Shelton, Saul Rubinek, Fyvush Finkel, Tony Plana, James Karen, Richard Fancy, Tony Goldwyn, Tom Bower, Sean Stone, Joshua Preston, Corey Carrier, David Barry Gray, John Diehl, Robert Beltran, Brian Bedford, Edward Herrmann, Dan Hedaya, Bridgette Wilson, Ric Young, Boris Sichkin, Sam Waterston, Tony Lo Bianco, George Plimpton	
D E C E M B E R	22	Balto	Universal Pictures / Amblimation	Simon Wells (director); David Cohen, Elana Lesser, Cliff Ruby, Roger S. H. Schulman (screenplay); Kevin Bacon, Bob Hoskins, Bridget Fonda, Phil Collins, Jim Cummings, Jack Angel, Danny Mann, Robbie Rist, Juliette Brewer, Sandra Dickinson, Miriam Margolyes, Donald Sinden, Garrick Hagon, Bill Bailey, Mike McShane, Jim Carter, Christine Cavanaugh, Patricia Parris, Chester Thompson, Steve Winwood, Lola Bates-Campbell, William Roberts, Big Al, Austin Tichenor, Reed Martin, Adam Long, Sam Bacco, Jennifer Blanc-Biehn, Holly Burt, Lauren Caputo, Tina Clark, Nathan DiGesare, Joel Dunham, Katy Dunham, Emily Estes, Bonnie Keen, Chris Rodriguez, Michael Shannon, Micah Wilshire	
D E C E M B E R	22	Cutthroat Island	Metro-Goldwyn-Mayer / Carolco Pictures	Renny Harlin (director); Robert King, Marc Norman (screenplay); Geena Davis, Matthew Modine, Frank Langella, Maury Chaykin, Patrick Malahide, Stan Shaw, Harris Yulin, Rex Linn, Paul Dillon, Jimmie F. Skaggs, Angus Wright, Ken Bones, Chris Masterson, George Murcell, Richard Leaf, Rupert Vansittart, Renny Harlin, Daragh O'Malley	
D E C E M B E R	22	Dracula: Dead and Loving It	Columbia Pictures / Castle Rock Entertainment	Mel Brooks (director/screenplay); Rudy De Luca, Steve Haberman (screenplay); Leslie Nielsen, Peter MacNicol, Steven Weber, Amy Yasbeck, Lysette Anthony, Harvey Korman, Mel Brooks, Mark Blankfield, Megan Cavanagh, Clive Revill, Chuck McCann, Avery Schreiber, Cherie Franklin, Ezio Greggio, Matthew Porretta, Rudy De Luca, Jennifer Crystal, Darla Haun, Karen Roe, Charlie Callas, Gregg Binkley, Anne Bancroft, David DeLuise	
D E C E M B E R	22	Grumpier Old Men	Warner Bros. Pictures	Howard Deutch (director); Mark Steven Johnson (screenplay); Jack Lemmon, Walter Matthau, Ann-Margret, Sophia Loren, Kevin Pollak, Daryl Hannah, Ann Guilbert, Burgess Meredith, Mike Reece, Katie Sagona, Max Wright	
D E C E M B E R	22	Sudden Death	Universal Pictures	Peter Hyams (director); Gene Quintano (screenplay); Jean-Claude Van Damme, Powers Boothe, Raymond J. Barry, Whittni Wright, Ross Malinger, Dorian Harewood, Kate McNeil, Michael Gaston, Audra Lindley, Brian Delate, Faith Minton, Jack Erdie, Jophery Brown, Manny Perry, Brian Hutchison, Jay Caufield, Bill Clement, The Cleveland Lumberjacks, Ian Moran, Jeff Jimerson, Mike Lange, Mario Lemieux, Luc Robitaille, Paul Steigerwald, Markus Näslund, Bernie Nicholls, Ken Wregget, John Barbero, Mark Kachowski	
D E C E M B E R	22	Tom and Huck	Walt Disney Pictures	Peter Hewitt (director); Stephen Sommers, David Loughery (screenplay); Jonathan Taylor Thomas, Brad Renfro, Eric Schweig, Charles Rocket, Amy Wright, Mike McShane, Marian Seldes, Rachael Leigh Cook, Courtland Mead, Joey Stinson, Blake Heron, Lanny Flaherty, Peter MacKenzie, Heath Lamberts, William Newman, Andy Stahl, Bronwen Murray	
D E C E M B E R	22	Waiting to Exhale	20th Century Fox	Forest Whitaker (director); Terry McMillan, Ronald Bass (screenplay); Whitney Houston, Angela Bassett, Loretta Devine, Lela Rochon, Gregory Hines, Dennis Haysbert, Mykelti Williamson, Michael Beach, Donald Adoesun Faison, Leon, Wendell Pierce, Jeffrey D. Sams, Jazz Raycole, Brandon Hammond, Kenya Moore, Lamont Johnson, Wren T. Brown, Starletta DuPois, Ezra Swerdlow, L. Scott Caldwell, Giancarlo Esposito, Kelly Preston, Wesley Snipes	
D E C E M B E R	25	Four Rooms	Miramax Films	Allison Anders, Alexandre Rockwell, Robert Rodriguez, Quentin Tarantino (directors/screenplay); Tim Roth, Antonio Banderas, Jennifer Beals, Paul Calderon, Sammi Davis, Valeria Golino, Madonna, David Proval, Ione Skye, Lili Taylor, Marisa Tomei, Tamlyn Tomita, Bruce Willis, Alicia Witt, Amanda de Cadenet, Lawrence Bender, Lana McKissack, Danny Verduzco, Patricia Vonne, Salma Hayek, Kathy Griffin, Quentin Tarantino	
D E C E M B E R	25	Richard III	United Artists	Richard Loncraine (director/screenplay); Ian McKellen (screenplay); Ian McKellen, Annette Bening, Jim Broadbent, Robert Downey Jr., Kristin Scott Thomas, Maggie Smith, Adrian Dunbar, Dominic West, John Wood, Nigel Hawthorne, Edward Hardwicke, Tim McInnerny, Jim Carter, Tres Hanley, Roger Hammond, Donald Sumpter, Bill Paterson, Kate Steavenson-Payne, Christopher Bowen, Matthew Groom, Marco Williamson, Edward Jewesbury, Michael Elphick, Stacey Kent	
D E C E M B E R	29	12 Monkeys	Universal Pictures	Terry Gilliam (director); David Peoples, Janet Peoples (screenplay); Bruce Willis, Madeleine Stowe, Brad Pitt, Christopher Plummer, David Morse, Jon Seda, Christopher Meloni, Frank Gorshin, Vernon Campbell, Lisa Gay Hamilton, Bob Adrian, Simon Jones, Carol Florence, Bill Raymond, Annie Golden, Thomas Roy, Joseph Melito	
D E C E M B E R	29	Dead Man Walking	Gramercy Pictures	Tim Robbins (director/screenplay); Susan Sarandon, Sean Penn, Robert Prosky, Raymond J. Barry, R. Lee Ermey, Celia Weston, Lois Smith, Scott Wilson, Roberta Maxwell, Margo Martindale, Barton Heyman, Ray Aranha, Larry Pine, Gil Robbins, Clancy Brown, Peter Sarsgaard, Jack Black, Jon Abrahams, Eva Amurri, Miles Robbins, Nesbitt Blaisdell, Kevin Cooney, Michael Cullen, Missy Yager	
D E C E M B E R	29	Mr. Holland's Opus	Hollywood Pictures	Stephen Herek (director); Patrick Sheane Duncan (screenplay); Richard Dreyfuss, Glenne Headly, Jay Thomas, Olympia Dukakis, William H. Macy, Jean Louisa Kelly, Alicia Witt, Joanna Gleason, Damon Whitaker, Terrence Howard, Alexandra Boyd, Nicholas John Renner, Joseph Anderson, Anthony Natale, Beth Maitland, Balthazar Getty	
D E C E M B E R	29	Restoration	Miramax Films	Michael Hoffman (director); Rupert Walters (screenplay); Robert Downey Jr., Sam Neill, Meg Ryan, David Thewlis, Polly Walker, Ian McKellen, Hugh Grant, Ian McDiarmid, Mary MacLeod, Mark Letheren, Rosalind Bennett, David Gant, Benjamin Whitrow, Bryan Pringle, Roy Evans, John Quarmby, Roger Ashton-Griffiths	

== See also ==
- List of 1995 box office number-one films in the United States
- 1995 in the United States
