= IEG =

IEG may refer to:

- Zielona Góra Airport – airport serving the city of Zielona Góra, located near Babimost in IATA codes
- Immediate early gene – gene that shows rapid and transient expression in the absence of de novo protein synthesis
- Initial Entertainment Group – Film and television production company
- Internet Entertainment Group – American internet pornographer
- Independent Evaluation Group – independent unit within the World Bank Group
- Leibniz Institute of European History – Historical research institute in Mainz, Germany
