= Play Dead (2009 film) =

- Directed by: Jason Wiles
- Written by: Shem Bitterman; Jason Wiles
- Produced by: Shem Bitterman; Mark Koetting; Mike O'Shea; Tom Rooker; Kurt Tuffendsam; Jason Wiles
- Starring: Chris Klein; Fred Durst; Jake Busey
- Cinematography: Mike O'Shea
- Edited by: Daniel R. Padgett
- Music by: Jeremy Grody
- Production company: Uncommon Entertainment
- Release date: September 22, 2009
- Running time: 85 minutes
- Country: United States
- Language: English

Play Dead is a 2009 black comedy film directed and co-produced by Jason Wiles, and written by Wiles and Shem Bitterman. The film stars Chris Klein, Fred Durst, and Jake Busey. Filming took place at the end of 2006, in Ely, Nevada and Los Angeles, California. The film was ultimately released direct-to-video on September 22, 2009.

== Plot ==
Ronnie Reno is a former TV action star in need of a comeback. After a failed audition, he ends up snowbound in a remote town in Nevada overrun with meth dealers including Merle and his dimwitted henchman, Ledge, who works as a crossing guard. After Reno finds the body of a dead DEA agent in Ledge's bathtub, he reunites with his former co-stars including Devon in order to save the town's residents and himself.

== Cast ==
- Chris Klein as Ronnie Reno
- Fred Durst as Ledge
- Jake Busey as Merle Jones
- Michael Beach as Devon
- Paul Francis as Ray Jones
- Timothy Ryan Hensel as Dickford Jones
- James Koetting as Sheriff
- Robert Cicchini as TV Announcer

== Production ==
In 2005, one of the film's eventual producers passed through Ely, Nevada on his way to Utah, while inadvertently leaving his wallet on his car roof. Three weeks later, the White Pine Sheriff's Office contacted the producer, and his wallet was ultimately returned. The occurrence was one reason that Ely was chosen as a filming location for the film. Director Jason Wiles, who wrote the film with producer Shem Bitterman, also chose the area because of its historic mine-town feeling and its wide-open views. Producer Kurt Tuffendsam said, "The town is amazing. It's hard to find a place like this." Tuffendsam also said, "Our movie actually centers around the town of Ely," unlike the 2001 film Rat Race, in which Ely stood in as Silver City, New Mexico.

In November 2006, production scouts planned for scenes to be shot at Ely's nearby Robinson Mine, as well as Steptoe Valley, and the road leading to Cave Lake State Park. Filming began in Los Angeles, California, on November 25, 2006, while filming in Ely was scheduled to begin the following week. On the second day of filming in Ely, a blizzard struck and the film crew did not have the option to wait through it; Bree Hicken, the film's script supervisor, said the film "actually turned out better" because of the blizzard, stating that the snow helped to make the film a true dark comedy. Play Dead was originally meant to be shot as a summer film. Filming in Ely took place in temperatures as low as 20 degrees below zero, for 12 hours at a time. Filming often continued into the night to allow for perfect shots.

The film's climactic scene, which would require extras, was scheduled to be shot on Ely's Aultman Street on the morning of December 8, 2006. Bitterman's 10-year-old daughter, Annabelle, had a role in the film as an endangered resident. Interior and exterior shots of Ely's Hotel Nevada and Gambling Hall were filmed for the movie. Filming concluded in Nevada on December 14, 2006, and returned to Los Angeles on December 17, 2006. Filming concluded two days later. In February 2007, the film was expected to be shown at film festivals after editing was completed.

In addition to Tuffendsam and Bitterman, Wiles also served as a producer on the film, alongside Mark Koetting, Mike O'Shea and Tom Rooker. Brett Herrin served as executive producer. A trailer for the film was released in August 2008, advertising a summer release. The film was ultimately released on DVD by Echo Bridge Home Entertainment on September 22, 2009.

== Reception ==
Tyler Foster of DVD Talk reviewed an early screener DVD copy of the film and wrote, "I've had many reactions to movies over the years, but Play Dead elicited a true rarity: complete and utter bewilderment. And I don't mean bewilderment as to what the plot was, who the characters were or things like the geography of scenes, what I mean is: who is this movie intended for? How did all of these actors read it and decide they wanted to do it? How did a co-writer/director (actor Jason Wiles, marking his sophomore directorial effort) with a completely nonsensical movie have the organizational and leadership skills to direct the final product? And most importantly, why did anyone buy it and offer to put it on DVD?" Foster concluded, "Skip it, I guess...unless you want to try and solve a cinematic puzzle."

Jordan Harrison of Home Media Magazine wrote, "Play Dead wobbles between the comedy, drama and action genres. It is rich with offensive language, and tries to be funny in places where it should have taken itself seriously. The best thing about the movie was Durst's performance. The film is worth seeing just for his role."
