= Magic Island (film) =

1995 US fantasy adventure comedy direct-to-video film by Sam Irvin

- Directed by: Sam Irvin
- Written by: Neil Ruttenberg; Brent V. Friedman
- Produced by: Albert Band; Debra Dion
- Starring: Zachery Ty Bryan; Andrew Divoff; Edward Kerr; Lee Armstrong; French Stewart; Jessie-Ann Friend; Oscar Dillon; Abraham Benrubi; Sean O'Kane; Schae Harrison; Ja'net Dubois; Terry Sweeney; Martine Beswick; Isaac Hayes; Sam Irvin
- Cinematography: James Lawrence Spencer
- Edited by: Margeret-Anne Smith
- Music by: Richard Band
- Production companies: Full Moon Entertainment; Moonbeam Entertainment
- Distributed by: Paramount Home Video
- Release date: December 19, 1995
- Running time: 88 minutes
- Country: United States
- Language: English

Magic Island is a 1995 American fantasy Adventure comedy direct-to-video film produced by Moonbeam Entertainment and released by Paramount Home Video. It was directed by Sam Irvin and starred Zachery Ty Bryan, Andrew Divoff, Edward Kerr, Lee Armstrong, French Stewart, Jessie-Ann Friend, Oscar Dillon, Abraham Benrubi, Sean O'Kane, Schae Harrison, and Ja'net Dubois.

== Plot ==
Jack Carlisle is a disillusioned 13-year-old boy. His mother is always away at work since his father left. He decides to run away, believing his mom won't miss him. As he is ready to leave, his nanny convinces him to read a 'magic book' that belongs to her.

The book is about a pirate adventure on Magic Island. As Jack reads the book, he is sucked into the world and goes on numerous adventures with Prince Morgan, while fleeing the evil Blackbeard the Pirate. He is eventually saved by Lily, a beautiful mermaid, whom he falls in love with.

Lily is given the power to turn into a human and accompanies Jack on his adventure. Along the way, Jack encounters sand sharks, a tree that grows the favorite food of the person who climbs it, and a cursed temple full of treasure. Jack also uses items he brought along with him in his "magic" bag to stop the pirates. Blackbeard was transformed into a gold statue by a guardian wizard.

Eventually, Jack says goodbye to Lily, letting Morgan keep a rug embroidered with gold & jewelry, and Jack is able to return home. He wakes up to his loving mother, and finds that his jeans are still torn and frayed and the flag on Prince Morgan's ship has transformed into his bag—signs that his adventure may have actually happened.

== Cast ==
- Zachery Ty Bryan as Jack Carlisle, a 13-year-old boy who is convinced if he runs away, no one will miss him. He gets sucked into the book and joins Prince Morgan, Gwyn, and Dumas on their adventure to find the Treasure before the villainous Captain Blackbeard and his band of pirates.
- Andrew Divoff as "Blackbeard", the wicked pirate who is determined to get the treasure first at all costs.
- Edward Kerr as Prince Morgan, the leader of the good guys.
- Lee Armstrong as Gwyn, the only female member of the good group. She is the tough fighter.
- French Stewart as Mr. Sapperstein
- Jessie-Ann Friend as Lily, who is so named by the fish, for "Lily" means "Mermaid" in "fish-talk." She saves Jack's life when he almost drowns. By saving his life, she is allowed a wish and uses it to gain legs and join Mad Jack on his adventures.
- Oscar Dillon as Dumas, the religious member of the good group.
- Abraham Benrubi as "Duckbone"
- Sean O'Kane as Bob "Jolly Bob"
- Schae Harrison as Mrs. Carlisle, Jack's mother.
- Ja'net Dubois as Lucretia, the Carlisle's housekeeper who gives Jack her "Magic Island" book.
- Terry Sweeney as Funny Face (voice)
- Martine Beswick as Lady Face (voice)
- Isaac Hayes as Mad Face (voice)
- Sam Irvin as Carbassas, the guardian of the Treasure.

== See also ==
- List of American films of 1995
