= Heart of the Beholder =

2005 American drama film

- Film poster
- Directed by: Ken Tipton
- Written by: Ken Tipton
- Produced by: Darlene Lieblich; Ken Tipton; Jeanette Voluturno; Arnon Manor
- Starring: Matt Letscher; Sarah Joy Brown; Greg Germann; Anne Ramsay; Michael Dorn; John Prosky; Arden Myrin; Silas Weir Mitchell; Priscilla Barnes; Chloë Grace Moretz; Jason Wiles; John Dye
- Cinematography: George Mooradian
- Edited by: Dana E. Glauberman
- Music by: Peter Rafelson
- Distributed by: Beholder Productions
- Release dates: January 1, 2005 (United States); September 30, 2005 (Westwood)
- Running time: 106 minutes
- Country: United States
- Language: English
- Budget: US$500,000

Heart of the Beholder is a 2005 drama film that was written and directed by Ken Tipton. It is based on Tipton's own experience as the owner of a chain of videocassette rental stores in the 1980s. Tipton and his family had opened the first videocassette rental stores in St. Louis in 1980; their business was destroyed by a campaign of Christian fundamentalists who objected to the chain's carrying the film The Last Temptation of Christ for rental.

The film showed at the 2005 Westwood Film Festival. Critic Ryan Cracknell summarized the film, "There's no shortage of material for writer-director Ken Tipton to work with here. That alone makes Heart of the Beholder a film of interest. It is in many ways a politically charged film as it touches on issues of freedom of speech, religious beliefs and all out fanaticism. Still, I didn't think it was charged with enough balance and I think a large part had to do with the film's inconsistent pacing."

The film won the best feature award at the 2005 New Hampshire Film Festival and the directors choice award at the 2005 Bluegrass Independent Film Festival.

== Cast ==
- Matt Letscher as Mike Howard
- Sarah Joy Brown as Diane Howard
- Greg Germann as Bob Harris
- Anne Ramsay as Reeba Holings
- Michael Dorn as Lieutenant Larson
- John Prosky as Reverend Brewer
- Arden Myrin as Patty
- Silas Weir Mitchell as Lester
- Priscilla Barnes as Miss Olivia
- Chloë Grace Moretz as Molly
- Jason Wiles as Deetz
- John Dye as D.A. Eric Manion
- Carrie Armstrong as Vesta
- Conrad Bachman as Rudy
- April Barnett as Rhonda
- Katelin Chesna as Marci
- Patty McCormack as Helen
- Roseanne Benjamin as Vicky
- Daphnée Duplaix as Detective Deborah Burbach
- Susan Johnston as Joan
- David Kelsey as Murphy
- Michelle Paradise as Denise Weston
