= Our First Time =

1998 internet hoax

Our First Time (OFT) was one of the first widely popularized Internet hoaxes. Eighteen-year-olds "Mike" and "Diane" made a public announcement declaring their intention to lose their virginity. The event would be broadcast live on ourfirsttime.com, so visitors could share the "experience".

OFT, which promoted itself as a free public service educational website, followed Mike and Diane day by day from July 18 to July 21, 1998, through HIV tests, condom selection, and telling their parents about their decision. So many millions of people attempted to view the site that the server crashed. The Internet Entertainment Group agreed to host it in exchange for links to their pornographic content.

Over time, some began to suspect it was a hoax. Mike and Diane looked older than 18 and appeared to be actors. "Mike" turned out to be Alabama actor Ty Taylor, and "Diane" turned out to be Michelle Parma, a former Dallas Cowboys cheerleader.

The enterprise fizzled when IEG backed out after the producer, Ken Tipton, revealed that his plan was to make money by charging Internet users $5 each for "age-verification" but planned for the couple to decide to abstain on the day set for the deflowering.

== Bibliography ==
- "Web's Virginity Event A Hoax, Company's Executive Says", Chicago Tribune, July 18, 1998.
- Our First Time at Museum of Hoaxes
- "Cyber Hoax", H. B. Koplowitz, 1998.
