= Sean O'Kane =

Scottish actor

- Born: 11 November 1964 (age 61); Bellshill, Scotland
- Occupation: Actor
- Years active: 1982–present
- Website: www.seanokane.com

Sean O'Kane (born 11 November 1964) is a Scottish actor.

== Career ==
Sean O'Kane grew up in Cambuslang near Glasgow, in a family with eleven siblings. He was interested in acting as a child, then at the age of 19, after a stint in the Territorial Army, O'Kane left the country. He took on stunt work, modeling and acting in student films, and arrived in Hollywood in the early 1980s. His first role was as Precinct cop Det. McKenzie on Cagney and Lacey. When the cast and crew discovered his young age, and the fact that he lived in the parking lot in a truck, they took him under their wings, and O'Kane appeared in several episodes over three years, although having a thick Glasgow accent impeded his chances of speaking on the show. After laying down The Prime of Miss Jean Brodie on tape at the request of Tyne Daly, in return she encouraged the young actor to learn more accents to broaden his talents. He left the show at Christmas of 1985, after being scouted by LA Models who sent him to Europe, and for the next three years he traveled the world non-stop modeling. O'Kane landed his first leading role in the British TV game show Interceptor (1989). He went on to star and co-star in films such as Magic Island (1995), Stone Soup (1993), and TV's Dream Team (1997), Sharpe's Justice (1997) and Taggart, as well as numerous voice-overs on such films as Million Dollar Baby, Patriot Games and Blown Away.
