= Jason Wiles =

American actor

- Born: Jason Austin Wiles; Kansas City, Missouri U.S.
- Occupation: Actor
- Years active: 1990–present

Jason Austin Wiles is an American actor known for his performances as NYPD Officer Maurice "Bosco" Boscorelli in the NBC procedural drama series Third Watch and as Colin Robbins in season 6 of Beverly Hills, 90210.

== Early life ==
Wiles was born in Kansas City, Missouri, and raised in Lenexa, Kansas, where he attended Holy Trinity Catholic School. After school he found employment with the local Parks and Recreation department, having passed up the opportunity to play college football.

== Career ==
In 1990, Wiles began to pursue an interest in film-making, working on the set of the film Mr. and Mrs. Bridge, filming on location in Kansas City. Not long after, the Stephen King tele-movie, Sometimes They Come Back, came to town and he worked on the crew as well as appearing in scenes as an extra. After forming some connections while working on these films, Wiles ventured to Los Angeles where he appeared in commercials before landing the lead in an after-school special. In 1994, he had a part in the Bon Jovi music video "Always". 1994 also gave him his first lead role, in the indie movie WindRunner, appearing with Margot Kidder and Russell Means. In 1995, Wiles made the first of 32 appearances in Beverly Hills, 90210 as Colin Robbins, a role which gained him some note in Hollywood. In 1999, Wiles garnered the role of Maurice 'Bosco' Boscorelli in the television drama Third Watch; he appeared in all six seasons of the show from 1999-2005.

Wiles expanded into directing and writing, as well as theatre. In the summer of 2002, he appeared in the Cape Playhouse production of Mass Appeal alongside Malachy McCourt, and in 2003 he was in Imua! Theatre Company's production of Safe which was co-written and directed by fellow Third Watch star Anthony Ruivivar. Upon completion of the final season of Third Watch, Wiles began work on his independent film Lenexa, 1 Mile (2006) which he wrote and also directed. Wiles appeared alongside Geena Davis and Donald Sutherland in the TV series Commander in Chief. He played a soldier in the series Army Wives, appearing in two episodes. He directed, produced and wrote a 2009 movie, Play Dead. He had a small part in the 2007 movie Zodiac. He appeared in 2009's horror thriller remake of The Stepfather. In the summer of 2010, he co-starred in the NBC drama-suspense miniseries, Persons Unknown.

Wiles appeared twice in the TV series Criminal Minds as a guest. He appears in "Psychodrama" (S2E4) as a bank robber, and in "The Fight" (S5E18) as a father who is held captive along with his daughter.

Wiles appeared in the Law & Order: Special Victims Unit episode "Branded" on October 20, 2010, as serial rapist Alexander Gammon.

In 2015, Wiles was part of the main cast for the MTV series Scream in the role of Sheriff Clark Hudson.

He also appeared in episode 4 of the sixth season of The Rookie.

== Filmography ==
=== Film ===
Year	Title	Role	Notes
1994	Windrunner	Greg Cima	
1994	Road Racers	Teddy Leather	
1995	Higher Learning	Wayne	
1995	Angel's Tide		
1995	Kicking and Screaming	Skippy	
1997	Kitchen Party	Steve	
1999	Matters of Consequence	Jake	
2005	Heart of the Beholder	Deetz	
2007	Zodiac	Lab Tech Dagitz	
2009	The Stepfather	Dylan Bennet	
2012	MoniKa	Reagan	
2013	The Jogger	Malcolm	
2019	Sunny Daze	Sunny	
2023	Your Lucky Day	Dick	

=== Television ===
Year	Title	Role	Notes
1995–1996	Beverly Hills, 90210	Colin Robbins	Recurring role
1998	To Have & to Hold	Michael McGrail	Main role
1999–2005	Third Watch	Maurice "Bosco" Boscorelli	Main role
2002	ER	Maurice "Bosco" Boscorelli	Episode: "Brothers and Sisters"
2005	Commander in Chief	Alex Williams	4 episodes
2006	Criminal Minds	Caleb Dale Sheppard	Episode: "Psychodrama"
2007	Army Wives	SGT Peter Belgrad	Episode: "One of Our Own"
2008	In Plain Sight	Detective Robert Patrone	Episode: Good Cop, Dead Cop
2010	Persons Unknown	Joe Tucker	Main role
2011	No Ordinary Family	Mike Powell	Episode: "No Ordinary Brother"
2011	Castle	Damian Westlake	Episode: "The Final Nail"
2011	CSI: NY	John Curtis	3 episodes
2013	The Bridge	Paul	2 episodes
2014	Stalker	Tom Wade	Episode: "Tell All"
2015	Scream	Sheriff Clark Hudson	Main role
2017	Escaping Dad	Darren Lattimer	Television film; originally titled Amber Alert
2017	In the Rough	Larry McCracken	Main role
2018	S.W.A.T.	Sergeant Vandelli	Episode: "Patrol"
2020	Deputy	David Browder	Episode: "10-8 Do No Harm"
2021	NCIS	Paul LeMere	Episodes: "Nearly Departed" and "Road to Nowhere"
2022	9-1-1: Lone Star	Ron Bettancourt	Episode: "Red vs. Blue"
2023	Will Trent	Officer Tate Grillo	Episode: "Manhunt"
