= Seth Warshavsky =

American internet pornographer (1973–2024)

Seth Warshavsky (1973–2024) was an American businessman and pornography entrepreneur who was the founder of the Internet Entertainment Group (IEG). During the dot-com bubble, Warshavsky's welcome of media attention made him the face of the online pornography industry to a public fascinated with what was then virtually the only segment of the dot-com industry operating at a profit. On February 10, 1998, he testified at a hearing on Internet Indecency before the US Senate Committee on Commerce, Science and Transportation.

Seth Warshavsky died in October 2024 from unknown causes.

Beginning in 1996, with the profits from a phone-sex operation he started while living in the Oregon building in Seattle, Washington, he had friends at AT&T who would find him sex-related numbers.

Warshavsky converted a warehouse in Seattle into the studios of IEG's flagship website, Clublove.com. The website used computer technology that was cutting edge for its day. The business model was similar to that of a live peep show. For a monthly membership fee plus an hourly charge, customers could watch postcard-sized, low-resolution images of women strip and touch themselves in real time. For more money, they could talk to the camgirls over the phone and direct them.

Warshavsky was featured on the front page of the Wall Street Journal in 1997.

In 1999, Warshavsky was rated number 40 on Time Magazine's list of 50 "most important figures in technology."

The series finale of Pam & Tommy depicted Warshavsky and IEG.

== Early Internet pornography scandals ==
Warshavsky was involved in many of the early Internet's porn-related media controversies, including:

- a 1996 lawsuit by Hasbro, publisher of the board game Candy Land, over the porn site candyland.com
- a 1997 lawsuit over the distribution of a homemade pornographic video starring Pamela Anderson and Tommy Lee
- a 1998 lawsuit over a sex video of Pamela Anderson and Bret Michaels (never aired by IEG)
- a 1998 lawsuit by actor Kelsey Grammer over another sex video (also never aired)
- a lawsuit over the Our First Time hoax
- a lawsuit over the published nude photographs of Laura Schlessinger in 1998
- a lawsuit over papalvisit.com, a website with information about the 1999 visit to the U.S. by Pope John Paul II that also featured salacious stories and links to pornographic websites
- a website related to the investment and creation, with David Marshlack, of voyeurdorm.com

== IEG collapse ==
At IEG's peak, Warshavsky claimed to have 100,000 subscribers and $100 million annual revenue, although subsequent events cast doubt on the veracity of this earnings claim.

In 1998, Pamela Anderson and Tommy Lee filed a $90 million copyright-infringement suit against IEG to claim a share of the profits of the video of them. A U.S. district court judge dismissed the case, ruling that the duo gave up their rights when they agreed to let IEG webcast the footage. Following appeals, Anderson and Lee were awarded a $1.5 million judgment plus court costs and attorney fees in December 2002.
