= Ken Tipton =

American actor

- Born: October 23, 1952 (age 73); El Paso, Texas, U.S.

Ken Tipton (born October 23, 1952) is an American entrepreneur and Internet hoaxster who has worked as a film actor since 1978. He is a member of the Screen Actors Guild (SAG), and he has also worked as director, screenplay writer, film producer and editor.

His first major film was Heart of the Beholder (2005), an independent low-budget project, which was based on his own life. He wrote the film's screenplay, co-produced and co-directed it and also acted in one of the supporting roles.

Tipton first came to the notice of the general public because of his creation of the hoax website ourfirsttime.com.
