= Jane Jenkins =

American casting director

- Born: Queens, New York City, U.S.
- Occupations: Film and television casting director
- Years active: 1979–2017
- Known for: Jurassic Park; A Few Good Men; The Princess Bride; Ghost

Jane Jenkins is an American casting director best known for her feature film work on Jurassic Park, Harry Potter and the Philosopher's Stone, A Few Good Men, Apollo 13, The Princess Bride, Ghost, and Home Alone. She has cast more than 190 film and television projects, primarily with her longtime casting partner, Janet Hirshenson.

Jenkins' first project as a casting director was for the 1980 independent feature film On The Nickel, written and directed by her then-boyfriend Ralph Waite.

Jenkins' and Hirshenson's work was instrumental in launching the careers of River Phoenix, Joaquin Phoenix, Robin Wright, Michael Keaton, Emma Watson, Daniel Radcliffe, Rupert Grint, John Cusack, Leonardo DiCaprio, Matt Damon, Winona Ryder, Jennifer Connelly, Brendan Fraser, Virginia Madsen, Meg Ryan, Benicio Del Toro, Jennifer Grey, Lea Thompson, Charlie Sheen, Tom Cruise, Ralph Macchio, Rob Lowe and Emilio Estevez.

Jenkins' and Hirshenson's last project together was the 2017 Rob Reiner film Shock and Awe.

== Awards ==
Fourteen feature films cast by Jenkins and Hirshenson were Oscar-nominated in the Best Actor and Best Actress categories, with three actors winning the award.

Year	Award	Category	Nominee(s)	Result	Ref.
1987	Artios Award	Outstanding Achievement in Casting for Feature Film, Drama	Stand By Me	Nominated	
1988	Artios Award	Outstanding Achievement in Casting for Feature Film, Comedy	The Princess Bride	Nominated	
1989	Artios Award	Outstanding Achievement in Casting for Feature Film, Drama	Tucker: The Man and His Dream	Nominated	
1989	Artios Award	Outstanding Achievement in Casting for Feature Film, Drama	Mystic Pizza	Nominated	
1990	Artios Award	Outstanding Achievement in Casting for Feature Film, Comedy	When Harry Met Sally...	Nominated	
1990	Artios Award	Outstanding Achievement in Casting for Feature Film, Comedy	Parenthood	Won	
1991	Artios Award	Outstanding Achievement in Casting for Feature Film, Comedy	Home Alone	Won	
1994	Artios Award	Outstanding Achievement in Casting for Feature Film, Comedy	Mrs. Doubtfire	Nominated	
1995	Artios Award	Outstanding Achievement in Casting for Feature Film, Drama	My Family	Nominated	
1996	Artios Award	Outstanding Achievement in Casting for Feature Film, Drama	Apollo 13	Nominated	
1999	Artios Award	Hoyt Bowers Award	Outstanding Contribution to the Casting Profession	Won	
2002	Artios Award	Outstanding Achievement in Casting for Feature Film, Comedy	Harry Potter and the Philosopher's Stone	Won	
2002	Artios Award	Outstanding Achievement in Casting for Feature Film, Drama	A Beautiful Mind	Nominated	
2004	Emmy Award	Outstanding Casting for a Miniseries, Movie, or a Special	Iron Jawed Angels	Nominated	
2004	Artios Award	Outstanding Achievement in Casting for Feature Film, Comedy	Something's Gotta Give	Nominated	
2009	Artios Award	Outstanding Achievement in Casting for Feature Film - Studio or Independent Drama/Comedy	Frost/Nixon	Nominated	
