= Mark Christopher Lawrence =

American actor (born 1964)

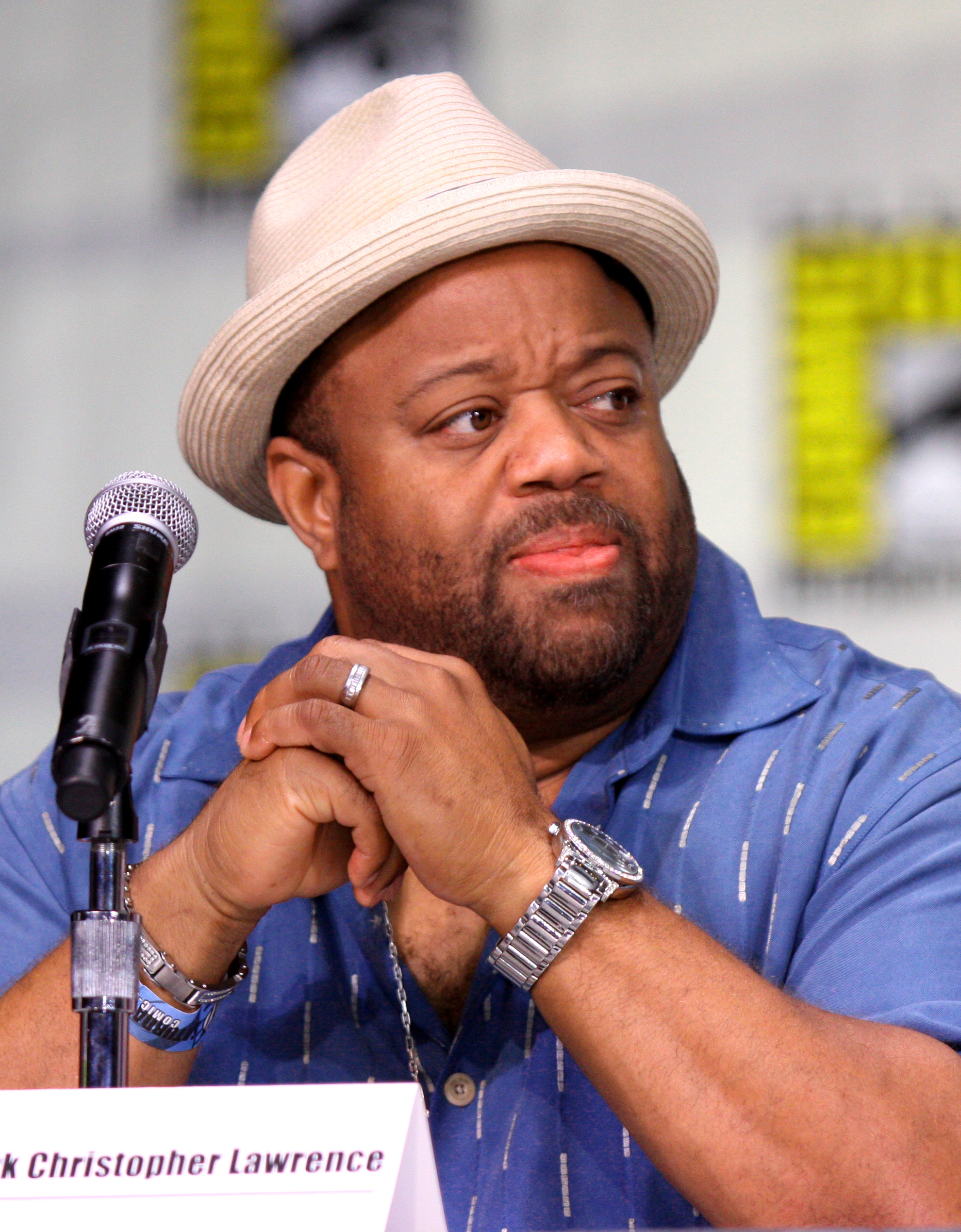
- Lawrence at the 2011 San Diego Comic-Con
- Born: May 22, 1964 (age 62); Los Angeles, California, U.S.
- Occupations: Actor, stand-up comedian, voice-over artist
- Years active: 1987–present
- Website: markchristopherlawrence.com

Mark Christopher Lawrence (born May 22, 1964) is an American character actor, stand-up comedian and voice-over artist. He is known for his role as esoteric D.J. Tone Def in the 1994 satirical rap mockumentary Fear of a Black Hat. He has appeared in popular films such as Child's Play 3 (1991), Crimson Tide (1995), Sprung (1997), Garfield: The Movie (2004) and The Island (2005).

Lawrence is best known for his role as Big Mike on the series Chuck. He has made guest appearances on many television programs, most notably Heroes, My Name Is Earl, Crossing Jordan, Dharma & Greg, Malcolm in the Middle, Touched by an Angel, Malcolm & Eddie, Men Behaving Badly, Seinfeld, Murphy Brown, Good Luck Charlie and Martin. He is also featured on the radio series Adventures in Odyssey as "Ed Washington".

== Early life and education ==
Lawrence grew up in Compton, California. He and his two siblings were raised by a single mother. In tenth grade, he became involved with his high school's debate team—immersing himself in forensics competitions and theater. After winning his school district's Literary Olympiad competition, Lawrence went on to compete at the state and national levels as a member of the Cerritos Community College forensics squad. There he went on to capture the collegiate Bovero-Tabor Award, awarded to the top community college speaker in the country. Lawrence gained the attention of the University of Southern California’s debate team coaches, and was awarded a full scholarship to attend the university. While at USC, he traveled the nation competing in tournaments. Meanwhile, he was gaining valuable experience in his craft by moonlighting at the Los Angeles Theater Center. There, a Hollywood talent agent noticed his skill and landed Lawrence his first job in television, a role on Hill Street Blues.

After graduation from USC with a degree in theatre acting, he worked with the San Francisco Mime Troupe while also performing standup comedy throughout the United States, Australia, and Canada, opening for major acts, such as Jerry Seinfeld and Rodney Dangerfield. Lawrence's work in live theater led to a Dramalogue Award for his performance in Reza Abdoh’s, Minimanta. He won an NAACP award for his work in Ken Davis' The Glass House in 1990. It was this role which attracted the attention of director, James Cameron, who then cast him as the "burly insane asylum attendant" in Terminator 2: Judgment Day.

== Filmography ==
=== Film ===
Year	Title	Role	Notes
1988	Caddyshack II	Construction Worker #4	
1989	Listen to Me	Attila	
1991	Terminator 2: Judgment Day	Burly Attendant	
1991	Child's Play 3	Cop	
1993	Fear of a Black Hat	"Tone Def"	
1993	12:01	Jack Spays	TV movie
1995	Crimson Tide	Rono, Chief Culinary Specialist	
1995	Tales from the Hood	Prison Guard	
1997	That Darn Cat	Rollo	
1997	Sprung	Brotha #3	
1997	The Rockford Files: Shoot-Out at the Golden Pagoda	Pagoda DJ	TV movie
1998	Senseless	Wig Shop Owner	
1998	Caught in the Spray	"Lil' Ass Gee"	Short
1999	Molly	Angels' Manager	
1999	Shake, Rattle and Roll: An American Love Story	Fats Domino	TV movie
2000	Retiring Tatiana	E.J.	
2001	Go with the Fro	-	Short
2001	Planet of the Apes	Friend At Leo's Party	
2001	Two Can Play That Game	Lying Man #4	
2001	K-PAX	Simms	
2003	Lost Treasure	Danny G.	
2004	Garfield: The Movie	Christopher Mello	
2004	Tiger Cruise	Pop	TV movie
2004	Christmas with the Kranks	Wes Trogden	
2005	Fair Game	Wesley	
2005	The Island	Construction Worker	
2005	Life Is Ruff	Calvin's Dad	TV movie
2005	Ordinary Miracles	Duty Sergeant	TV movie
2006	The Pursuit of Happyness	Wayne	
2008	Shout!	-	
2008	The Club	Donovan	Short
2009	Halloween II	Deputy Fred King	
2010	Speed-Dating	Dr. Petesmith	
2010	Sudden Death!	Jim	Short
2010	Uncle Matin's Sword Trick	Azeem	Short
2010	Silverlake Video: The Movie	Landlord	
2011	Sock Babies	Dad	Short
2014	Cooties	Mr. Pederson	
2014	Blood Lake: Attack of the Killer Lampreys	Ted	TV movie
2015	Cocked	Burt	TV movie
2015	Always Watching: A Marble Hornets Story	Gary Rockwell	
2015	When I Wake Up	Ronnie Williams	Short
2016	The Death of Rasputin	Detective Reynolds	Short
2016	Moving On	Detective Weston Dempsey	Short
2017	Stage Fright	-	TV movie
2017	Conflict of Interest	Rich	
2017	Circus Kane	Billy	
2018	West of Hell	Abram	
2018	Mr. Malevolent	Borris	
2019	Maybe I'm Fine	Detective Greene	
2019	The Flourish	Dennis	Short
2019	One Fine Christmas	Al	TV movie
2019	2nd Chance for Christmas	Spoken Word Poet	
2020	Skin: The Movie	Marvin	
2020	$TACK$	Hector	Short
2020	Sleeper Agent	Mike	
2020	Leave 'em Laughing	Soup Guy Fan	Short
2021	Nothing Is Impossible	Pastor Lawrence	
2021	Romeo and Juliet: A Covid Trajedy	Father Lawrence	Short
2022	3 Little Kungpoo Goats	Hyena	
2022	Family Camp	Pastor Dave	

=== Television ===
Television appearances by Lyric Bent
Year	Title	Role	Notes
1987	Ohara	Carl	Episode: "The Sparrow"
1991	Roc	Husband	Episode: "A Home, a Loan"
1992	Designing Women	Black Gentleman	Episode: "Driving My Mama Back Home"
1992	Evening Shade	Mr. Powell	Episode: "Hasta la Vista"
1992	Seinfeld	Skycap	Episode: "The Airport"
1993	In Living Color	-	Episode: "The Info Group"
1993	Martin	Security Guard	Episode: "Hollywood Swinging: Part 2"
1994	Murphy Brown	Trekker	Episode: "Where Have You Gone, Joe DiMaggio?"
1994	Seinfeld	Boss	Episode: "The Race"
1995	The George Wendt Show	Fletcher Williams	Main Cast
1996	The Show	Chris	Recurring cast
1996	3rd Rock from the Sun	The Bartender	Episode: "Gobble, Gobble, Dick, Dick"
1997	Coach	Dave "Big Dave"	Episode: "A Boy and His Doll"
1997	High Incident	-	Episode: "Excessive Force"
1997	Sister, Sister	Mr. Kirkpatrick	Episode: "Child's Play"
1997	Men Behaving Badly	Russell	Recurring cast: season 2
1998	Kelly Kelly	Hank	Episode: "Episode One"
1998	Malcolm & Eddie	Squires	Episode: "A Few So-So Men"
2000	Touched by an Angel	Hank	Episode: "A Perfect Game"
2000	Malcolm in the Middle	Sheriff #1	Episode: "Traffic Jam"
2001	Yes, Dear	Tony	Episode: "The Daddies Group"
2001	Dharma & Greg	Arnold	Episode: "Do the Hustle"
2001	Emeril	Matt	Episode: "Blind Dates"
2003	The Mullets	Bill	Recurring cast
2004	American Dreams	Melvin Bishop	Episode: "Real-to-Reel"
2004	Crossing Jordan	Rob Morton	Episode: "Second Chances"
2004	Grounded for Life	Duane	Episode: "Pressure Drop"
2004	Reba	Bar Bouncer	Episode: "Girls' Night Out"
2004	Center of the Universe	Moe	Episode: "Independence Day"
2005	Hot Properties	John	Episode: "Waiting for Oprah"
2006	My Name Is Earl	Jack Knox	Episode: "Stole P's HD Cart"
2006	Weeds	Mike	Episode: "Cooking with Jesus"
2007	Heroes	Mr. Lamont	Episode: "Chapter Four 'The Kindness of Strangers'"
2007–2012	Chuck	Michael "Big Mike" Tucker	Recurring cast: season 1, main cast: seasons 2–5
2008	Chuck Versus the Webisodes	Michael "Big Mike" Tucker	Recurring cast
2008	Buy More	Michael "Big Mike" Tucker	Recurring cast
2010	Buy Hard - The Jeff and Lester Story	Michael "Big Mike" Tucker	Main Cast
2011	Retired at 35	Carl	Episode: "The Tell-Tale Cart"
2012	Glee	Rob Adams	Episode: "Glease"
2013	Lab Rats	Announcer	Episode: "Robot Fight Club"
2013	Good Luck Charlie	Bernie	Episode: "Duncan Dream House"
2014	Franklin & Bash	Henry Shae's Boss	Episode: "Honor Thy Mother"
2014-2015	Kirby Buckets	Coach Batchelder	Episode: "Killer Puppies" & "Atta Boy"
2015	Murder?	Jason	Episode: "Part 1 & 4"
2015–2016	Chain Comedy Hour	Cast Member	Main Cast
2016	Inside the Extras Studio	Will Johnson	Episode: "Famous Director"
2016	The Encounter	Sheldon	Episode: "Her Final Role"
2016	Pitch	Russell	Episode: "Unstoppable Forces & Immovable Objects"
2017	Malibu Dan the Family Man	Marty Dankles	Recurring cast
2019	The Detour	Officer Bradshawl	Episode: "The Return"
2019	Chartered	Mr. Jay Heard	Episode: "Pilot"
2019	Black Jesus	Detective Samuels	Episode: "The Compton Crusader"
2020	The Dream	Tom	Episode: "Pilot"
2020	Two Degrees	Mark	Episode: "Dr. Abigail & Me"
2021–2025	All the Queen's Men	Gene Marks	Recurring cast: season 1, 5
2022	Sprung	Hank	Episode: "Chapter Seven"
