= Joe Torry =

American actor and comedian

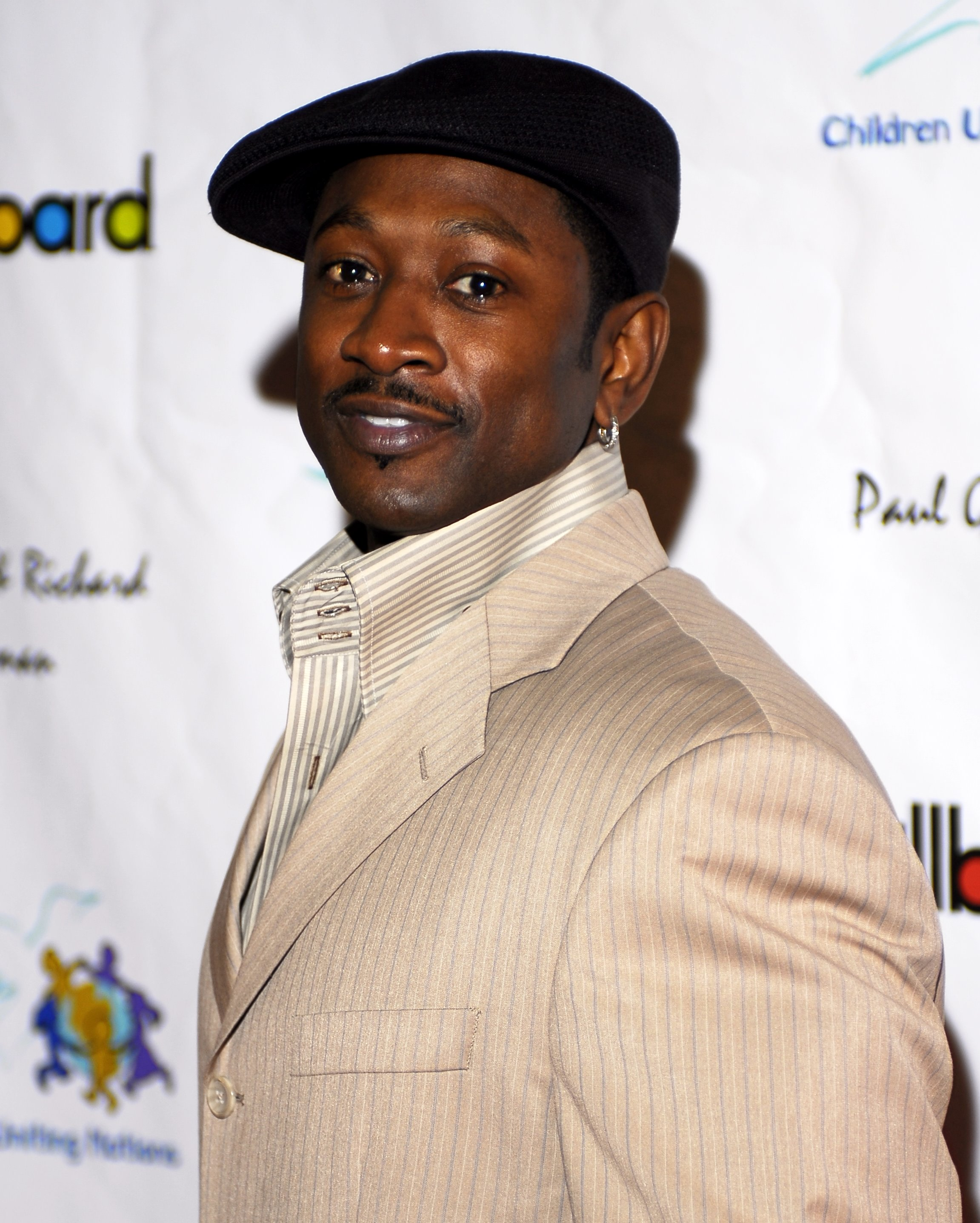
- Joe Torry at the 79th Annual Academy Awards Children Uniting Nations and Billboard afterparty
- Born: United States
- Education: Lincoln University
- Occupations: Actor, comedian, screenwriter
- Years active: 1989–present
- Known for: Poetic Justice
- Family: Guy Torry (brother)
- Website: mrjoetorry.com

Joe Torry is an American comedian, actor, and screenwriter. Torry is the older brother of comedian Guy Torry who is known for creating Phat Tuesdays a weekly stand-up comedy show launched in 1995 for African American comedians that was held at The Comedy Store in Hollywood, the live comedy show later became the focus for a 2022 Amazon television series of the same name.

== Early life and career ==
Joe Torry, and five siblings, were brought up in St. Louis, Missouri. Torry is a self-described military brat who discovered at an early age he was funny when doing classroom show and tell presentations. He later found that his future was in the world of comedy.

Growing up Sammy Davis Jr. was an idol of his and he attempted to learn comedy from such entertainers as Abbott and Costello and Dick Van Dyke.

Torry earned a Bachelor of Arts degree in broadcast journalism and communications at Lincoln University, plus a human letters honorary doctorate for his years in show business.

Before later becoming host of Def Comedy Jam, Torry made a name for himself in stand-up comedy, film and television, appearing in such projects as Dangerous Minds, House Party, Tales from the Hood, John Singleton's Poetic Justice, NYPD Blue and ER.

== Filmography ==
=== Film ===
| Year | Title | Role | Notes |
|---|---|---|---|
| 1990 | House Party | Student in Cafeteria | |
| 1991 | Talkin' Dirty After Dark | Audience Member | |
| 1991 | Strictly Business | Darryl | |
| 1991 | The Three Muscatels | Andre Squire | |
| 1993 | Poetic Justice | Chicago | |
| 1994 | House Party 3 | D-Trick | |
| 1994 | Exit to Eden | Baggage Cop | |
| 1995 | Tales from the Hood | Stack | |
| 1996 | Fled | Bo Grant | |
| 1997 | Back in Business | Tony Dunbar | |
| 1997 | Sprung | Clyde | |
| 2000 | Lockdown | Alize | |
| 2001 | The Flamingo Rising | Pete Moss | TV movie |
| 2001 | The Commitments | T-Bone | TV movie |
| 2004 | Motives | Derrick Woods | Video |
| 2004 | Hair Show | Brian | |
| 2005 | Getting Played | Josh | TV movie |
| 2006 | The Boston Strangler | Police Chief | Video |
| 2007 | Motives 2 | Derrick Woods | Video |
| 2007 | Redrum | Tyrone | |
| 2007 | The Mannsfield 12 | Trey Pound | |
| 2008 | Boston Strangler: The Untold Story | Arthur Winfield | Video |
| 2009 | Mimi's Place | Fred | Short |
| 2009 | Why Am I Doing This? | Kenny | |
| 2009 | The Dog Who Saved Christmas | Perry Winkle | TV movie |
| 2012 | Who's Watching the Kids | Daan | |
| 2012 | Pawn Shop | Pierre | |
| 2012 | Love Overboard | Angelo | Video |
| 2013 | Caught on Tape | Delivery Man | |
| 2013 | Act Like You Love Me | B Smooth | Video |
| 2013 | The Power of Love | Jamal | |
| 2014 | Act of Faith | Mann Mann | |
| 2015 | Soul Ties | Morris | |
| 2019 | Perfectly Single | Greg | |
| 2019 | The Workout Room | Teejay | |
| 2021 | City Limits | James | |
| 2022 | Unreported | Mike | |
| 2025 | Different with Me | Pastor Bryan | |

=== Television ===
| Year | Title | Role | Notes |
|---|---|---|---|
| 1991 | It's Showtime at the Apollo | Himself | Episode: "Episode #4.20" |
| 1991 | Amen | Ice Pick | Episode: "Three's a Crowd" |
| 1992 | Def Comedy Jam | Himself | Episode: "Episode #1.1" & "#2.11" |
| 1992 | Roc | Lee | Episode: "What's Up, Roc?" |
| 1994–95 | Def Comedy Jam | Himself/Host | Recurring Host: Season 4-5 |
| 1996 | Dangerous Minds | Martin | Episode: "Evolution" |
| 1997 | ER | Chris Law | Recurring Cast: Season 3–4 |
| 1999 | NYPD Blue | Willis | Episode: "Dead Girl Walking" |
| 2001 | On the Beat | Himself/Host | Main Host |
| 2003 | NCIS | Darryl Wilkins | Episode: "Seadog" |
| 2003–04 | Girlfriends | Mel | Recurring Cast: Season 4 |
| 2005 | Turn Up the Heat with G. Garvin | Himself | Episode: "Joe Torry's Chicken" |
| 2008 | 1st Amendment Stand Up | Himself | Episode: "Lavell Crawford/Joe Torry/Steve Mazan" |
| 2009 | Nite Tales | Thug #1 | Episode: "Ima Star" |
| 2012 | Uptown Comic | Himself/Host | Main Host |
| 2013 | Zane's The Jump Off | Chandler Bishop | Recurring Cast |
| 2014–17 | Unsung Hollywood | Himself | Recurring Guest |
| 2017 | Grown Folks | Earl | Episode: "Competing For Love" |
| 2019 | Unsung | Himself | Episode: "Adina Howard" |
| 2020 | Game On: A Comedy Crossover Event | Chuckie | Episode: "Family Reunion: Remember the Family's Feud?" |
| 2022 | Phat Tuesdays | Himself | Main Guest |
