= Something Wicked (2014 film) =

- Theatrical release poster
- Directed by: Darin Scott
- Screenplay by: Joe Colleran
- Story by: Joseph Mungra
- Produced by: Joe Colleran
- Starring: Shantel VanSanten; John Robinson; Brittany Murphy; Julian Morris; James Patrick Stuart; Robert Blanche
- Cinematography: Thomas L. Callaway
- Edited by: Michael Chariker
- Music by: Kyle Newmaster
- Production company: Chambers Productions
- Distributed by: Merchant Films
- Release date: April 4, 2014
- Running time: 95 minutes
- Country: United States
- Language: English
- Budget: $3 million

Something Wicked is a 2014 American psychological thriller film directed by Darin Scott and starring Shantel VanSanten, John Robinson, Brittany Murphy, Julian Morris, James Patrick Stuart, and Robert Blanche. The film follows a young woman who is tormented after a tragic accident that caused the death of her parents. It marks the last feature film appearance of Murphy, who died on December 20, 2009.

Principal photography of Something Wicked took place between April and June 2009 in Eugene, Oregon. The film remained shelved for over four years until it was given a limited regional release in the Pacific Northwest of the United States beginning April 4, 2014. Its release expanded to California and Nevada in September of that year.

== Plot ==
Christine, a virgin bride-to-be, and her fiancé, James, have a promising future ahead of them. Christine has just been accepted to Oregon State University and is excited about the prospect of her education as well as the chance to start a family of her own. However, a gruesome car crash leaves both of her parents dead and Christine is overpowered with grief. As her wedding day approaches, the terror only gets worse as she tries to convince others that she is being stalked. Her psychiatrist, Susan, feels that Christine is showing signs of PTSD as dark secrets from the past slowly emerge.

== Cast ==
- Shantel VanSanten as Christine Webb
- John Robinson as James Campbell
- Brittany Murphy as Susan Webb
- Julian Morris as Ryan Anderson
- James Patrick Stuart as Bill Webb
- Robert Blanche as John Anderson
- Angelique Perrin as Zeal Anderson
- Jerry L. Buxbaum as Ed Young
- Joe Feeney as Dave Johnson
- Betty Moyer as Ellen Webb
- Lance Rosen as Doug Webb
- October Moore as Donna Moore

== Production ==
=== Development ===
Director Darin Scott described the film as an "erotic neo-noir giallo." After the casting of Shantel VanSanten and John Robinson in the lead roles, Brittany Murphy's casting was announced in the spring of 2009.

=== Filming ===
Principal photography took place between April and June 2009 in Eugene, Oregon on a budget of $3 million. Shooting locations included the University of Oregon campus, Pioneer Cemetery, and Edison Elementary School.

Murphy died six months after completing the film, on December 20, 2009. At the time of her death, the film was reported to have recently completed post-production.

Scott Chambers, an executive producer on the film, noted that during production, Murphy seemed "ill" and "as much as 10 pounds underweight, and she’s a small person to begin with. She easily could have made an excuse not to come to work, but she didn’t. She said, ‘I’ve got to get better, but I want to do this part." Other sources reported that some sequences had to be re-written around Murphy due to her tenuous physical state. Murphy was reportedly hospitalized in April 2009 while shooting the film due to untreated diabetes.

In December 2012, a press release confirmed that the film had been finally completed after further post-production and additional shooting took place in Oregon earlier that year.

== Release ==
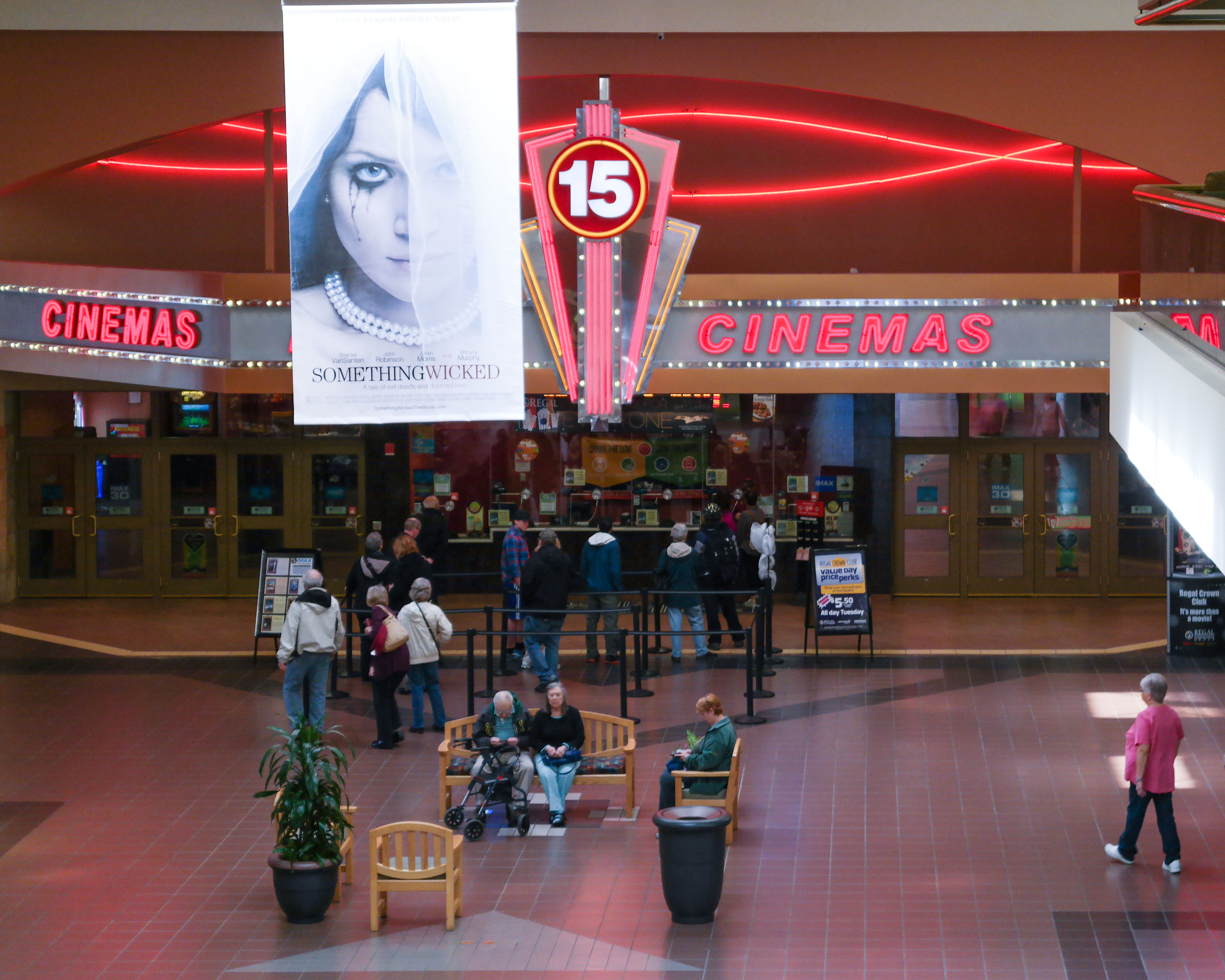
Poster for the film on its premiere date at the Regal Cinema in Valley River Center

The producers of Something Wicked noted in an interview shortly after Murphy's death that the film did not have a distributor at that time, and that Murphy's "family’s wishes on the timing could be taken into account and result in screening postponements."

An official theatrical trailer was released in April 2014. Something Wicked had its world premiere at the Valley River Center Regal Cinema in Eugene, Oregon on April 4, 2014, followed by screenings at additional Regal locations the Portland and Seattle areas beginning April 11, 2014. The film's release expanded to additional Regal locations in Southern California and Nevada on September 12, 2014.

=== Home media ===
Arc Entertainment released Something Wicked on DVD on March 17, 2015.

== Reception ==
=== Critical response ===
James McDonald of Irish Film Critic gave the film a favorable review, describing it as an "entertaining thriller."

Jake Dee of JoBlo.com disliked the film, faulting it for having an incoherent plot and lack of mystery, noting that it "is riddled with dizzying flashbacks and disjointed jump-forwards, which makes it damn near impossible to follow, never mind truly care about. The movie wants to be a sappy romantic thriller, a demonic possession movie and a vengeful slasher joint all at once, but never fully commits to or executes either facet to satisfying ends." J. M. Willis of Shockya gave the film an overall C rating, summarizing: "Fans of Lifetime movies about “true story” murders will dig this because it was made for them."
