= Tales from the Hood 2 =

2018 film directed by Rusty Cundieff

- Directed by: Rusty Cundieff; Darin Scott
- Written by: Rusty Cundieff; Darin Scott
- Produced by: Rusty Cundieff; Darin Scott; Elaine Dysinger; Griff Furst; Jim Steele
- Starring: Keith David; Bryan Batt; Lou Beatty Jr.; Alexandria DeBerry; Bill Martin Wililams; Martin Bradford; Kendrick Cross
- Cinematography: Keith L. Smith
- Edited by: Miriam L. Preissel; John Quinn
- Music by: Frederik Wiedmann
- Production companies: Universal 1440 Entertainment; 40 Acres and a Mule Filmworks; Hood Productions, inc.
- Distributed by: Universal Pictures Home Entertainment
- Release dates: July 13, 2018 (Fantasia Fest); October 2, 2018
- Running time: 111 minutes
- Country: United States
- Language: English

Tales from the Hood 2 is a 2018 American black horror anthology film written and directed by Rusty Cundieff and Darin Scott, executive-produced by Spike Lee, and starring Keith David, Bryan Batt, Lou Beatty Jr., Alexandria DeBerry, Bill Martin Wililams, Martin Bradford, and Kendrick Cross. The film is the sequel to Cundieff and Scott's 1995 horror anthology Tales from the Hood and tells the story of Mr. Simms acting as a consultant to a prison operator who's developing "Robo-Patriots" as he hears different stories from Mr. Simms to help determine which criminals they should go after. The segments "Good Golly", "The Sacrifice", and "Robo Hell" were directed by Rusty Cundieff. The segments "The Medium" and "Date Night" were directed by Darin Scott. The film met with positive reviews.

== Plot ==
=== "Robo Hell" (beginning) ===
At some time in the not too distant future, a racist and sleazy prison operator named Dumass Beach (Bill Martin Williams), is working with his aides Grant (Jay Huguley) and Kelly to lead a team to construct an army of AI "Robo-Patriots", which can learn from firsthand experience as well as from secondhand stories and function as law enforcement officers. He recruits the great storyteller Mr. Simms (Keith David) to fill their heads with information from his stories to help them better determine who is a criminal and thereby fill his prisons, suggesting "Black Lives Matter" as the theme. With that in mind, Simms tells the first story that he calls "Good Golly".

=== "Good Golly" ===
White siblings Audrey (Alexandria DeBerry) and Philip (Andy Cohen) and their black friend Zoe (Jasmine Akakpo) take a vacation together. While Philip is hiking, Audrey takes Zoe to visit a place called the Museum of Negrosity. Inside, the two discover that the museum houses an assortment of racist propaganda such as posters, books, and dolls (including the doll from the "KKK Comeuppance" segment of the first film). Meeting with the curator Floyd (Lou Beatty Jr.), Audrey explains that she wants to buy a golliwog doll named "Golly Gee" for her collection. Floyd informs them that nothing in the museum is for sale and that the doll is a tool of racial propaganda that carries over 100 years of racism inside it.

That night, the girls return with Philip, who also happens to be Zoe's boyfriend, and break into the museum to steal the doll. They end up breaking its glass display case when they knock over a whipping post. The three of them find a book titled Golliwog Goes to Hell, but notice that all of the pages after the first page are blank. The Golliwog (Kenneth Kynt Brown) comes to life and grows to human size. It kills Zoe by using the doorway of a Coon Chicken Inn as a guillotine and Philip by whipping him with a bullwhip until he is disemboweled. Audrey tells Golly Gee that she loves him and expresses her desire to simply stay with him and ends up having sex with the doll.

Months later, Audrey is ready to give birth and tells Floyd, dressed in surgical apparel, that she wishes to go to a hospital for the delivery for the sake of the child. Floyd says that he would not be able to explain the situation. Multiple miniature golliwog dolls then burst out of her stomach. Floyd commiserates with Golly Gee, back to doll size and in his repaired display case, telling him "How dare they call you a stereotype? You're just the creation they designed you to be!" As more golliwogs are born, Audrey dies.

=== "Robo Hell" (wraparound #1) ===
Dumass enjoys the story, but questions Mr. Simms if he has any stories from a more criminal standpoint. He offers to tell a story about gangsters to honor Beach's request that he calls "The Medium".

=== "The Medium" ===
Cliff Bettis (Creighton Thomas), a notorious pimp-turned-legitimate businessman, is kidnapped and tortured by Brian (Martin Bats Bradford), Booze (Kedrick Brown), and Gore (Chad L. Chambers), a trio of thugs who seek to take the five-million-dollar fortune he possesses. Cliff refuses to surrender the money, explaining that he has used it to establish two magnet schools and several workplaces, to help give jobs and sponsor scholarships to improve life for the next generation. Unfortunately, Cliff is beaten to death by one of the thugs for insulting him, jeopardizing their plans.

Meanwhile, phony TV psychic John Lloyd (Bryan Batt) records the chatter among his studio audience before the show and uses the notes provided by his staff to present the illusion of channeling spirits. The robbers see the show and hatch a new plan. They kidnap Cliff's girlfriend, singer Sandra Blake (Sandra Gutierrez), and bring her to Lloyd's house. Under their orders, she seduces him into opening the door for them to enter. They tell him to channel Cliff, using Sandra as a bargaining chip for him to tell them where the money is. When John rhetorically asks what would happen if he explains that he isn't actually psychic, the thugs say that they would kill him and rob his house so that their mission isn't a complete loss. Terrified for his life, John agrees to channel Cliff.

When John begins to act out a séance, he finds himself actually possessed by a series of different spirits accusing the robbers of unjustly killing them. Ultimately, Cliff begins to speak through John to the robbers and they threaten to kill Sandra if Cliff doesn't tell them where the money is. Cliff telekinetically jams their guns and kills Booze by twisting his neck, kills Gore by shooting broken glass into his mouth, and kills Brian by electrocuting him with 500 volts from wires attached to the chandelier. Permanently possessed by the spirit of Cliff, John goes on to be even more successful as a true psychic.

=== "Robo Hell" (wraparound #2) ===
Dumass likes "The Medium" even better, stating that it's something the Robo-Patriot could learn from. While excusing himself, Simms notices Beach sexually harass the women on the design team. Kelly mentions that he does it to her as well, but she has learned to ignore it. Inspired by this fact, Mr. Simms proceeds to tell the next story that he calls "Date Night".

=== "Date Night" ===
Ty (Alexander Biglane) drives with his friend Kahad (Greg Tarzan Davis) for a date with Carmen (Alexandria Ponce) and Liz (Cat Limket), two aspiring actresses he hooked up with on Tinder. Wondering how he managed to get dates with such good looking girls, Kahad asks what Ty told them. He admits to lying about them being an agent and casting director. When they arrive at the luxurious house, they assume Carmen and Liz are trust fund babies and not aspiring actresses. They meet and party with Carmen and Liz for a while, playing Cards Against Humanity with the girls. Afterwards, Ty drugs the girls' drinks and carry them upstairs, revealing that the two are sexual predators who are implied to have done this sort of thing many times.

As they set up a scene to film themselves having sex with the unconscious girls, Kahad finds that Carmen and Liz's bodies cannot be seen in the viewfinder. The girls wake up and reveal themselves to be vampires who proceed to chase and bite their attackers. When Ty and Kahad finally wake up, they find themselves locked in a makeshift prison with ravenous fanged men attempting to reach through the bars. Greeting the boys through a monitor in their cell, Carmen and Liz explain that the men on the other side of the bars are also Internet predators who, instead of being killed, have been accidentally turned into vampires themselves and left to starve. They beg to be let go, but Carmen and Liz decline and release the starved predators on the duo who devour them as the girls laugh.

=== "Robo Hell" (wraparound #3) ===
Dumass also likes "Date Night", but excuses Ty and Kahad's actions by saying "boys will be boys". Mr. Simms asks if they have time for one more story.

=== "The Sacrifice" ===
In 1955, young Emmett Till (Christopher Paul Horne) is brutally beaten and lynched for speaking with a white girl in Money, Mississippi.

In the present day, an interracial couple is expecting a child, following a miscarriage in the previous year. The white mother Emily Bradley (Jillian Batherson) keeps having dreams where Emmett tells her that he is not sure if they deserve the child, and she fears he may be trying to take their baby away. She runs to the window and yells to someone unseen to leave her alone. The black father, councilman Henry Bradley (Kendrick Cross), is visited by his mother Mama Bradley (Greta Glenn) who insists that Emily does not need the stress of him being involved in an election campaign. Henry says that his mother is only saying that because he is supporting Republican gubernatorial candidate William Cotton (Cotton Yancey), whom she believes is targeting voting locations in predominantly black districts for closure. Dr. Martin Gwinnett (David Dahlgren) examines Emily and says that she is fine, but that she should stay in bed and think good thoughts.

Henry holds a fundraiser at the house where William Cotton states that his mission is to take Mississippi back to its core values, joking that Henry would have been serving them in those days. As he is collecting campaign contributions, William appraises Henry for the event, where it is revealed that Henry is supporting William because he has promised to make Henry mayor if he becomes governor. Emily comes downstairs and announces that Emmett is choosing to live, meaning that her child will have to die. She grabs a knife, runs out into the yard, throws it at the ghost of Emmett, which her husband and the fundraiser guests cannot see. Mama Bradley brings an elderly man named Mr. Winters (Wayne Dehart) who was with Emmett on the night of the lynching and can see his ghost. Winters says that Henry must change his vote so that the voting locations are not closed, but Henry accuses his mother of concocting the story in order to get him to change his vote.

Gwinnett returns and determines that the fetus is indeed shrinking. When Henry says that he is the father, Gwinnett insists that he will not work for an interracial couple. Emily suddenly insists that Henry kidnapped her and isn't her husband before she hits him with a lamp and Gwinnett drives her away. After being confronted by his mother and touched by Winters, Henry finally sees the ghost of Emmett, who mentions that he has been "blessed with a chance to see the future." However, Emmett laments that Henry is voting against the interests of his people, deciding that the horrific death he endured was all for nothing.

Henry is also visited by the ghost of Carol Denise McNair (Jayla McDonald) and her friends from Sunday school who were killed in the 16th Street Baptist Church bombing. This is followed by a visit from the ghosts of James Chaney (Brandon J Williams), Andrew Goodman, and Michael Schwerner (Stephen Doerfler), as well as Medgar Evers and Martin Luther King Jr. (Terrance Sims). The final visitor is Emmett's mother Mamie Till who insisted on a public funeral service with an open casket so that her son's beaten face could be photographed and seen by the public, sparking the Civil Rights Movement. Henry refuses to believe any of this is happening or respect the sacrifices and refuses to change his vote, leaving Emmett to decide to go back and do things differently, apologizing to his killers for speaking to the white woman he spoke to. Winters explains that if Emmett chooses to live instead of die, then his sacrifice will never occur, resulting in the Civil Rights Movement grinding to a halt, explaining that this is the reason why history has inexplicably altered.

William Cotton arrives in SUVs labelled "Klan Patrol" as Emily accuses Henry of rape. Cotton and his men beat Mama Bradley and attempt to abduct Henry. He quickly promises to Emmett that he will vote against the closure of the voting locations. Emmett informs him that that is no longer an option, mentioning that Henry will have to go the extra mile and sacrifice his life. Henry agrees to do it and allows himself to be beaten to death by the Klan Patrol. As history returns to normal, Henry's spirit senses that his child will now live. He and Emmett disappear with Mama Bradley expressing her pride in her son.

=== "Robo Hell" (ending) ===
After expressing his dislike for "The Sacrifice", Beach presents the "Robo-Patriot" at a press conference, claiming that it can predict who will commit crimes against lawful citizens. When activated, the Robo-Patriot identifies potential thieves and illegal immigrants in the audience. Analyzing the stories that have been stored into its memory, the Robo-Patriot identifies Beach and his team (who, after each story, have shown themselves to be greedy, racist, and misogynistic) as an immediate threat to American civilization. The robot kills Grant and Kelly, viewing them as accomplices of Beach for their inaction toward his behavior, while Beach himself flees, pursued by the robot.

As he runs away, Mr. Simms arrives, driving an SUV, and offers to rescue him. Beach discovers that he has been wounded by the robot and begins to verbally abuse Simms, but Simms simply tells him that they are not in a car. The car transforms into a hearse, Beach turns around and sees his own corpse inside a coffin behind him. Simms then reveals that Beach died from his injury, that Simms is Satan, and that they are in Hell as the hearse becomes surrounded by flames. Demons then drag the screaming Beach out of the car while Simms cackles maniacally.

In a post-credits scene, Mr. Simms turns to the audience and proclaims "Now that was some shit"! Then he walks off into Hell.

== Cast ==
Robo Hell:

- Keith David as Portifoy Simms; he was portrayed by Clarence Williams III in the last film
- Bill Martin Williams as Dumass Beach
- Jay Huguley as Grant Measpine
- Jeffrey Bryant Moss as Press Conference Crowd
- Toney Chapman Steele as Press member
- Rusty Cundieff as Reporter
- Leslie Castay as Reporter

Good Golly:

- Alexandria DeBerry as Audrey
- Jasmine Akakpo as Zoe
- Andy Cohen as Philip
- Lou Beatty Jr. as Floyd
- Kenneth Kynt Bryan as Golliwog

The Medium:

- Bryan Batt as John Lloyd
- Creighton Thomas as Cliff Bettis
- Martin Bats Bradford as Brian
- Kedrick Brown as Booze
- Chad L. Chambers as Gore
- Sandra Gutierrez as Sandra

Date Night:

- Alexander Biglane as Ty
- Greg Tarzan Davis as Kahad
- Alexandria Ponche as Carmen
- Cat Limket as Liz
- Zakery Jones as Vampire

The Sacrifice:

- Kendrick Cross as Henry Bradley
- Jillian Batherson as Emily Bradley
- Greta Glenn as Mama Bradley
- David Dahlgren as Dr. Martin Gwinette
- Wayne Dehart as Mr. Winters
- Cotton Yancey as William Cotton
- Christopher Paul Horne as Emmett Till
- Jayla McDonald as Carol Denise McNair
- Brandon J Williams as James Earl Chaney (uncredited)
- Stephen Doerfler as Michael Schwerner
- Terrance Sims as Martin Luther King Jr.
- John C. Coffman as Political Fundraiser / Klan Cop
- Cynthia LeBlanc as Political Fundraiser
- Elton LeBlanc as Political Fundraiser / Klan Cop
- Patrick Kearns as Klan Cop

== Production ==
Co-director Rusty Cundieff had wanted to make a sequel to Tales from the Hood ever since the films release, but had struggled to garner studio support until the success of Get Out in 2017.

In January 2018, Cundieff announced on Twitter the sequel was going into production within the year and that he was scouting locations in Louisiana. In April 2018, it was announced that actor Keith David would portray Mr. Simms, the storyteller role originally played by Clarence Williams III in the original film. Williams turned down the offer to reprise the role due to his retirement from acting. The film was shot in Louisiana throughout April 2018.

== Release ==
The film had its world premiere at the Fantasia International Film Festival in Canada on July 13, 2018.

The film was released direct-to-video on October 2, 2018.

The film received mostly positive critic reviews. On review-aggregation website Rotten Tomatoes, the film holds a "fresh" score of 78% based on reviews from 9 critics.

== Sequel ==
In October 2018, Cundieff expressed interest in continuing the series as an anthology show, potentially for a streaming service or television, with each episode featuring a different story in the style of The Twilight Zone and Night Gallery.

A sequel, Tales from the Hood 3, was released on October 16, 2020, on Syfy.

== See also ==
- List of black films of the 2010s
- List of hood films
