= Darin Scott =

American film and TV writer, director, producer

Darin Scott is an American film and TV writer, director and producer. He also co-directed the film Tales from the Hood 2. He initially studied to be a chemical engineer at USC. He won an MTV Movie & TV Award for Best Movie of the Year, for his 1993 effort Menace II Society.

== Filmography ==
=== Film ===
Year	Film	Credited as			Ref.
Year	Film	Director	Producer	Writer	Ref.
1987	From a Whisper to a Scream	No	No	Yes	
1989	Stepfather II	No	Yes	No	
1990	To Sleep with Anger	No	Yes	No	
1993	Fear of a Black Hat	No	Yes	No	
1993	Menace II Society	No	Yes	No	
1994	Love and a .45	No	Yes	No	
1995	Tales from the Hood	No	Yes	No	
1997	Sprung	No	Yes	No	
1998	Caught Up	Yes	No	Yes	
2001	The Brothers	No	Yes	No	
2014	Something Wicked	Yes	No	No	
2018	American Nightmares	Yes	Yes	Yes	
2018	Deep Blue Sea 2	Yes	No	No	
2018	Tales from the Hood 2	Yes	Yes	No	
2020	Tales from the Hood 3	Yes	Yes	No	
2023	Every Breath She Takes	Yes	No	No	

=== Television ===
Year	Film	Credited as			Notes
Year	Film	Director	Producer	Writer	Notes
2008–2012	Femme Fatales	Yes	Yes	No	8 episodes
2012	The Failing Man	No	Yes	No	4 episodes
2014	The Kill Corporation	No	Yes	No	1 episode
