= Caught Up (film) =

1998 American crime-drama film directed by Darin Scott

- Theatrical release poster
- Directed by: Darin Scott
- Written by: Darin Scott
- Produced by: Elaine Dysinger; Peter Heller
- Starring: Bokeem Woodbine; Cynda Williams; Clifton Powell; Tony Todd; Basil Wallace; Jeffrey Combs; Snoop Dogg; LL Cool J
- Cinematography: Thomas L. Callaway
- Edited by: Charles Bornstein
- Music by: Marc Bonilla
- Distributed by: LIVE Entertainment
- Release date: February 27, 1998
- Running time: 97 minutes
- Country: United States
- Language: English
- Box office: $6,754,958

Caught Up is a 1998 American crime-drama film written and directed by Darin Scott. The film stars Bokeem Woodbine and Cynda Williams.

== Plot ==
Daryl Allen is an ex-con who has been serving time for drug charges. Now he plans to get his life straight, open up a nightclub and be a part of his son Jerome's life. His friend Trip offers to give him the $10,000 for his club. Daryl drives Trip to the bank, unaware he's taking part in a robbery. During a police chase, they get into a car accident. Trip is killed and Daryl is sent back to prison. During that period, his girlfriend Trish gets married and moves away with their son. Five years later, Daryl is released from prison. His parole officer, Jake, informs him that if he gets into trouble again, he will serve 25 years to life in prison. Daryl meets a psychic named Vanessa Dietrich, who looks exactly like his ex-girlfriend. When a masked gunman shoots at them, Vanessa gives Daryl a gun with which he scares the man away. The two of them spend the night together.

The next morning, Daryl wakes up with a gun pointed at his head. The man holding the gun introduces himself as Vanessa's friend, Billy. He tells Daryl the gun is empty and that he was just testing him. Vanessa walks in and tells Daryl that she's gotten him work as a limo driver. After initially refusing to work for Billy, he eventually takes the job. Daryl becomes friends with Herbert, who also works for Billy. Later, Vanessa does a tarot card reading for Daryl which seems eerily accurate to his life.

The gunman shoots at Daryl and Vanessa again as they're leaving a club. Daryl suspects that Vanessa is the reason they're being targeted. Vanessa says she thinks her ex-lover Ahmad, a Jamaican mobster, is after her. Daryl subsequently decides to stay away from Vanessa. One night, Billy asks Daryl to deliver a car for a client. When the car gets a flat tire, Daryl goes to retrieve the spare and finds a dead body in the trunk. Daryl heads to Billy's office, beats him up and quits the job. On the way back to his apartment, Daryl is arrested. Herbert walks in and reveals that he is really a cop named Frank Lowden, who has been investigating Billy for months. He insists that Daryl must keep his job.

Daryl goes to Vanessa and demands that she tell the truth about what's going on. She reveals that Ahmad gave her a diamond worth half a million dollars. Daryl doesn't want to get involved, but spends the night with her. The next morning, Daryl wakes up with blood on his hands and discovers that Vanessa has been murdered. Daryl buys a gun and questions Billy about Ahmad. Billy claims to know nothing and orders his bodyguard to hurt Daryl, who hides in a closet. Suddenly, Ahmad shows up and kills Billy's bodyguard. His men tie Billy to a chair and question him about how to find Daryl, as he is now wanted for murdering Vanessa. Ahmad discloses that Vanessa helped him steal a case of diamonds, but she betrayed him by taking the diamonds and disappearing. One of Ahmad's bodyguards pours sulfuric acid on Billy's head as an intimidation tactic, but pours too much and accidentally kills him.

Daryl decides to leave town, but first calls Trish's husband, Roger, who says he hasn't seen her in a week after they had a fight. Daryl then speaks to his son, Jerome and tells him to stay out of trouble. While driving, Daryl realizes something isn't right and heads back to Los Angeles, where he digs up Vanessa's grave and finds Trish's body instead. Daryl follows Lowden to a house and waits for him to leave. Inside, Daryl finds Vanessa, who faked her own death by killing Trish to escape from Ahmad. Daryl wants to take Vanessa to the police, but he is knocked out and handcuffed by Lowden, who had partnered with Vanessa and planned to sell the stolen diamonds. Ahmad arrives to confront Vanessa and Lowden, and orders Vanessa to give him the diamonds. As a shootout begins, Daryl knocks a lamp over and breaks it. In the darkness, everyone is killed except Daryl. Before Vanessa dies, she tells Daryl that she loves him. Daryl takes a bag of money and calls Jake from a payphone, where he explains that Ahmad and his crew were the ones who shot at him and Vanessa. However, Jake tells Daryl that Ahmad was unaware of Vanessa's whereabouts until he heard that she was dead. Daryl is knocked out again when a vehicle crashes into his car.

Daryl awakens to find himself being held at gunpoint by a former security guard from the bank that Trip robbed. The guard was shot by Trip in the genitals during the robbery and has been stalking Daryl to get revenge. Daryl realizes the guard's actions are what led to Trish's death and attacks him, but gets shot and falls into the water, while the guard commits suicide. Daryl survives as he was wearing a bulletproof vest. Later, he uses the money he took from Vanessa to open his own club, and reunites with his son, Jerome.

== Cast ==
- Bokeem Woodbine as Daryl Allen
- Cynda Williams as Trish Harlin / Vanessa
- Jason Carmichael as Rob
- Jeffrey Combs as Security Guard
- Michael Clarke Duncan as "Big Black"
- Shedric Hunter, Jr. as Jerome
- Marcus Johnson as "Strap"
- Joseph Lindsey as Billy Grimm
- LL Cool J as Roger
- Courtney McLean as Bob
- Jeris Poindexter as Larry
- Clifton Powell as Herbert / Frank Lowden
- Damon Saleem as Trip
- Snoop Dogg as "Kool Kitty Kat"
- Tony Todd as Jake Samples
- Basil Wallace as Ahmad
- Chris Brown as Sonny

== Release ==
"Caught Up" was one of the final film credits of LIVE Entertainment, which became Artisan Entertainment in July 1998 (and was in turn swallowed up by Lionsgate.)

=== Box office ===
The film opened in 713 theatres on February 27, 1998. Its opening weekend the film was able to gross $2,422,631, ranking number ten for the weekend box office. The following weekend, although opening in nine more theaters, the film was only able to pull in $1,024,103, dropping to sixteen in the ranks. By the end of its theatrical run, the film acquired a total of $6,754,958.

== Critical reception ==
On the review aggregator website Rotten Tomatoes, 0% of 8 critics' reviews are positive.

== Soundtrack ==
A soundtrack containing hip hop music was released on February 24, 1998, by Noo Trybe/Virgin Records. It peaked at #30 on the Billboard 200 and #6 on the Top R&B/Hip-Hop Albums.

== See also ==
- List of hood films
