= Fear of a Black Hat =

1994 film directed by Rusty Cundieff

- Theatrical release poster
- Directed by: Rusty Cundieff
- Written by: Rusty Cundieff
- Produced by: Darin Scott
- Starring: Rusty Cundieff; Larry B. Scott; Mark Christopher Lawrence
- Cinematography: John Demps Jr.
- Edited by: Karen Horn
- Music by: Jim Manzie; Larry Robinson; N.W.H.
- Production company: ITC Entertainment
- Distributed by: The Samuel Goldwyn Company
- Release dates: January 24, 1993 (Sundance); June 3, 1994 (United States)
- Running time: 89 minutes
- Country: United States
- Language: English
- Budget: $1 million
- Box office: $233,824

Fear of a Black Hat is a 1993 American mockumentary film on the evolution and state of American hip hop music. Written and directed by Rusty Cundieff in his directorial debut, the film stars Cundieff, Larry B. Scott and Mark Christopher Lawrence. Fear of a Black Hat is similar in format to the satirical film about early 1980s heavy metal, This Is Spinal Tap. It is told from the point of view of a graduate student who is documenting the hip hop group N.W.H. (which stands for "Niggaz With Hats", a reference to N.W.A.) for a year as part of her thesis.

The title is derived from the 1990 Public Enemy album Fear of a Black Planet. The film premiered at the Sundance Film Festival on January 24, 1993, and was later theatrically released on June 3, 1994. While critically acclaimed, it was a box office bomb. Its stature has grown in the years since its release and the film has acquired a cult following.

== Plot ==
Nina Blackburn, a sociologist who analyzes hip hop as a form of communication, chooses to make a documentary on the hardcore gangsta rap group called N.W.H. ("Niggaz With Hats") for her graduate thesis. The N.W.H. members are Ice Cold, the main rapper and the intelligent and vulgar backbone of the group; Tasty Taste, the ultra-violent secondary rapper who always seems to be armed with a variety of dangerous assault weaponry; and Tone Def, an esoteric DJ who is talented enough to scratch with his buttocks and his penis (the latter is not shown directly, but humorously implied).

As Nina documents N.W.H. for a year, she becomes familiar with the band members, their beliefs, and their often strange behavior. The members wear outrageous headwear during their performances, because according to N.W.H., hats are a symbol of resistance and revolution since their hatless slave ancestors were too tired from working all day in the sun to revolt. This is a typical example of the bizarre logic the group uses to explain the deeper meanings behind their otherwise crude and base music and images.

A running joke is N.W.H.'s use of over-the-top graphic language (e.g. sex, violence and rantings against the police), which their detractors see as a cheap means to sell records, but in their eyes is essential to conveying a "socially relevant message". They offer jaw-dropping explanations on why songs such as "Booty Juice" and "Come and Pet the P.U.S.S.Y." are in fact deep and socially significant, and that critics obviously do not truly understand the "real meaning". Throughout the movie, it is difficult to tell if the members of N.W.H. truly believe what they are saying, or are just portraying an image.

A lot of time also goes into describing N.W.H.'s feud with another rap group, the Jam Boys. The groups constantly insult and discredit each other, sometimes resulting in the brandishing of weapons. At one point, N.W.H. brings to light evidence that the Jam Boys' lead rapper attended a prep school, directly threatening his street credibility. A macabre running gag involves their white managers dying under mysterious circumstances (the group originally insist that they "wasn't in town when the shit happened"). They explain to Nina that their first few managers were black—in fact, were their relatives—and that they decided switching to white managers would be better for their families and the black community.

N.W.H.'s internal matters turn sour when Ice Cold wants to break away from the group because of his desire to participate in a film, and Cheryl C., a groupie, hooks up with Tasty-Taste. Although she is clearly more interested in his money than in him, Tasty lets her take over his life. When Tasty finds Cheryl and Ice Cold in bed, the group has an argument that leads to the dissolution of N.W.H., with each member launching a solo career. Ice dedicates himself to house music; Tasty makes a diss track in which he curses Ice; and Tone Def becomes a hippie (with obvious references to "flower rappers", such as P.M. Dawn). None of the guys sees much success until they ultimately reunite for a triumphant comeback in which their differences have been set aside, at least for the time being.

== Cast ==
- Rusty Cundieff as "Ice Cold"
- Larry B. Scott as "Tasty Taste"
- Mark Christopher Lawrence as "Tone Def"
- Kasi Lemmons as Nina Blackburn
- Howie Gold as Guy Friesch
- Barry Heins as Marty Rabinow
- G. Smokey Campbell as Backstage Manager #1
- Bobby Mardis as Promoter #1
- Brad Sanders as Promoter #2
- Faizon Love as "Jam Boy"
- Darin Scott as Security Head
- Kurt Loder as Himself
- Rose Jackson as Cheryl C.

== Characters ==
Along with the film's title and its central characters, there are other characters seen briefly who are parodies of real-life prominent figures in hip-hop:

- Jike Spingleton: a portmanteau of filmmakers John Singleton and Spike Lee (the character criticizes both filmmakers for "stealing" his look and cinematic styles)
- M.C. Slammer: M.C. Hammer
- Parsley, Sage, Rosemary and Thyme: Salt-N-Pepa
- Vanilla Sherbet: Vanilla Ice
- Yo Highness: Queen Latifah
- Ice Tray, Ice Box, Ice Coffee, Ice Berg, etc.: variations of the name "Ice" and the overuse of it in general in the rap industry.
- The Jam Boys: The Fat Boys
- Touch and Groove: Krush Groove
- Marty Rabinow: N.W.H.'s manager; his name is similar to Rainbow, which is a joke on Jewish names containing colors (e.g. Goldman, Goldberg, Greenberg, Silverberg); he is also a parody of stereotypical Jewish managers of African-American performers, such as N.W.A's manager Jerry Heller. Rabinow is portrayed as a decent man whom N.W.H. likes and who provides them with sound, honest management. However, like those who preceded him, Marty dies—as a result of a self-inflicted gunshot under very bizarre comedic circumstances.

== Music ==
=== Songs ===
- "Booty Juice": The song's video spoofs the prototypical hip hop "pool scene" found in many videos, with N.W.H. surrounded by a bevy of scantily clad girls.
- "Come and Pet the P.U.S.S.Y.": A solo track from Ice Cold's post-N.W.H. group, The Ice Plant. It is a spoof on "Gonna Make You Sweat (Everybody Dance Now)" by C+C Music Factory. The main joke is that a Japanese woman lip-syncs the powerful voice of a heavy-set African-American woman without the latter getting credit for it, also in reference to the real-life conflict Martha Wash had with C+CMF regarding the same track.
- "Fuck the Security Guards": A send-up of "Fuck tha Police" by N.W.A.
- "A Gangsta's Life Ain't Fun": Based on "New Jack Hustler (Nino's Theme)" by Ice-T, spoofing its thinly veiled admiration for sex, crime, and drugs. This is also mirrored in the title, because the video implies that a gangsta's life is fun. The song is not found on the soundtrack album, as the "Gangsta's Life" segment was only inserted into the VHS and DVD releases of the film.
- "Guerillas in the Midst": Based on "Guerillas in tha Mist" by Da Lench Mob, the song's backdrop is centered on the 1992 Los Angeles riots.
- "Grab Yo Stuff": The episode draws upon the 1990 arrest of three members of 2 Live Crew in Broward County, Florida for performing songs from their album As Nasty as They Wanna Be; the group had been warned that performances of certain songs would lead to arrest. N.W.H. sacrifices its artistic integrity/gangsta attitude in order to avoid trouble, changing the song "Grab Yo Dick" into "Grab Yo Stuff" when police threaten to arrest N.W.H. The group is arrested after Ice Cold accidentally hits himself in the groin while on stage and blurts out "My dick!"
- "Granny Said Kick Yo Ass": Tasty Taste's solo single, a parody based on "Mama Said Knock You Out" by LL Cool J.
- "Ice Froggy Frog": A parody of "Who Am I (What's My Name)?" by Snoop Dogg.
- "I'm Just a Human": Performed by Tone Def's post-N.W.H. group New Human Formantics, and based on "Set Adrift on Memory Bliss" by P.M. Dawn.
- "Kill Whitey": Not actually played in the movie, but discussed with Nina Blackburn in an interview regarding N.W.H.'s highly controversial lyrics. The group explains that the title "Kill Whitey" does not actually refer to violence against whites, but instead is a reference to their former manager Whitey DeLuca, who allegedly scammed the band out of a sum of money. He later ended up dead, but the group "wasn't in town when the shit happened." Whitey DeLuca was not actually white, he was "olive-complected", according to Ice Cold.
- "My Peanuts"': An early Ice Cold solo song based on "My Penis" by Ice Cube and Dr. Dre, which itself is a parody of "My Adidas" by Run-D.M.C.
- "Wear Yo Hat (Buried and Bald)": Based on Public Enemy songs such as "Don't Believe the Hype" and "Bring the Noise", with Ice Cold and Tasty Taste vocally mimicking Public Enemy's Chuck D. and Flavor Flav.
- "White Cops on Dope": Only available on the motion picture soundtrack and DVD bonus features. The song is a musical parody of the Tubes' "White Punks on Dope", and is based on the trend of rappers working with rock bands (such as the Run-D.M.C./Aerosmith version of "Walk This Way") in an effort to cross over to mainstream audiences. Ric Ocasek of the Cars is featured on the track.
- "Santa Claus Is Coming": The only song title mentioned from the group's Christmas album Ho Ho Hoe's. It is intimated that the title is a sexual double entendre rather than a cover of "Santa Claus Is Comin' to Town".

=== Albums ===
- P.U.S.S. Why?
- Straight Outta Da Butt - A parody of N.W.A's Straight Outta Compton
- Kill Whitey
- Garden Hoe's
- Ho Ho Hoe's - a Christmas album
- Guerillas in the Midst - A parody of Da Lench Mob's Guerillas in tha Mist
- Fear of a Black Hat - A parody of Public Enemy's Fear of a Black Planet
- The Black in the Hat Comes Back - the planned reunion album

=== Soundtrack ===
The original soundtrack was released by Avatar Records on June 1, 1994. The soundtrack has eleven songs; however, the song from the film A Gangsta's Life Ain't Fun was not included in the soundtrack.

1. Wear Yo Hat - N.W.H.
2. My Peanuts - Ice Cold
3. Guerrillas in the Midst - N.W.H.
4. Booty Juice - N.W.H.
5. F**k the Security Guards - N.W.H.
6. A Gangsta's Life Ain't Fun - N.W.H.
7. Come Pet the P.U.S.S.Y. - The Ice Plant
8. I'm Just a Human Being - New Human Formantics
9. Granny Said Kick Yo Ass - Extreme Use of Force
10. Grab Yo Stuff - N.W.H.
11. White Cops On Dope - N.W.H. feat. Ric Ocasek
12. Ice Froggy Frog - N.W.H.

== Release ==
Fear of a Black Hat debuted at the 1993 Sundance Film Festival to strong critical reception. However, CB4, a film that similarly parodies the hip hop world and starred Chris Rock, was released in March of that year to moderate box office success. A deal to distribute Fear of a Black Hat fell through, delaying the film's release. The film premiered in limited theatrical release on June 3, 1994, more than a year after its Sundance debut. Its worldwide box office take totaled $233,824, making the film a financial flop.

== Critical reception ==
Despite the film's poor box office performance, it was lauded by critics. On Rotten Tomatoes, the film holds a rating of 83% based on 24 reviews, with an average rating of 6.9/10. On Metacritic, the film has a score of 62 out of 100 based on 20 critics, indicating "generally favorable" reviews.

Janet Maslin of The New York Times wrote:

Flattering the daylights out of Rob Reiner and his "Spinal Tap" crew, Rusty Cundieff turns "Fear of a Black Hat" into an unapologetic "Spinal Tap" imitation. And there's no point in faulting Mr. Cundieff for such derivativeness, because "Fear of a Black Hat" is too savvy and cheerful to warrant complaints. Anyway, the more the merrier: what "Spinal Tap" did for heavy metal certainly deserves to be done for rap, which is the target this time. If Mr. Cundieff doesn't match the satirical genius of Mr. Reiner's film, he does understand the rules of the game.

Owen Gleiberman of Entertainment Weekly gave the film a B− grade, opining that although it "never achieves the dizzying cinema verite swirl that made Spinal Tap such a timeless satire [...] Cundieff has what nearly every commentator on the rap scene has lacked: a first-class bull detector."

In a three-star review, Roger Ebert wrote the film "is not as fearless and sharp-edged as it could be—but it provides a lot of laughs, and barbecues a few sacred cows." He added:

A truly uncompromising satire on this subject could probably not be filmed at this time, I suppose. You can almost feel "Fear of a Black Hat" pulling back in sensitive areas; going so far and no further. Nor does the movie really have much to say about the music itself - music which, like the heavy metal of "Spinal Tap", takes itself more seriously than anyone with common sense is likely to take it (rap and heavy metal are both more about attitudes than about melody). But the movie is funny and fresh, and filled with wicked little moments like the uneasy meeting of five or six rappers who all have "Ice" in their names.

A decidedly more mixed review came from Peter Rainer of the Los Angeles Times, who wrote that "the idea is so funny that for a long time the film coasts on our good will. But it should be funnier than it is. Writer-director Rusty Cundieff, who also stars, along with Larry B. Scott and Mark Christopher Lawrence, as one of the three members of the rap group N.W.H., has a loose-limbed comic sense, and there are hilarious bits poking through the tedium. What the movie lacks is any kind of smart, sociological sense. It's a defanged spoof."

The film's reputation has grown since its release, and it has gained a cult following. In August 2023, The Criterion Channel included Fear of a Black Hat as part of its film series celebrating 50 years of hip hop.

== Year-end lists ==
- Honorable mention – Glenn Lovell, San Jose Mercury News
- Honorable mention – Howie Movshovitz, The Denver Post
- Honorable mention – Michael MacCambridge, Austin American-Statesman

== See also ==
- CB4
- List of hood films
