= Guy Torry =

American actor and comedian

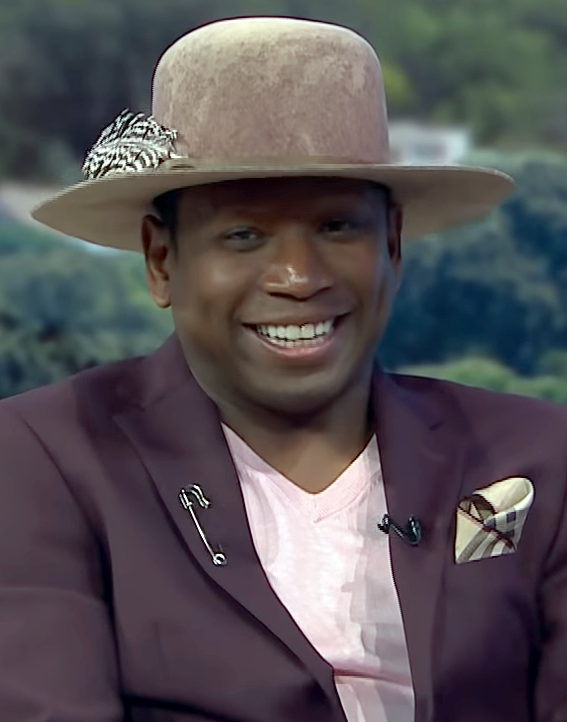
- Guy Torry in 2019
- Born: St. Louis, Missouri, United States
- Education: Southeast Missouri State University
- Occupations: Actor; comedian
- Years active: 1991–present
- Known for: Phat Tuesdays; American History X
- Family: Joe Torry (brother)
- Website: guytorry.com

Guy Torry is an American actor and comedian.

He is the younger brother of actor and comedian Joe Torry.

== Life and career ==
Guy Torry is a native of St. Louis, Missouri and enrollee of Southeast Missouri State University. Torry moved to Los Angeles after his brother, Joe Torry, had done the same. Guy Torry came to Los Angeles to finish his marketing degree yet later chose to seek a comedy career after seeing the Russell Simmons HBO show Def Comedy Jam, circa 1992.

Nearly after two years of practicing comedy, he landed his debut on national television on Def Comedy Jam. Following this he did stand-up comedy for the Def Comedy Jam Tour throughout the United States.

Torry has since been featured in such television series and films as Premium Blend, Comic View, Showtime at the Apollo, Runaway Jury and Don't Say a Word.

One of Torry's best known film roles was that of the prisoner Lamont in American History X.

== Phat Tuesdays ==
Torry created and hosted a weekly stand-up comedy show called Phat Tuesdays. Launched in 1995 for African American comedians, Phat Tuesdays was held at The Comedy Store in Hollywood. Phat Tuesdays ended in 2005 and became the focus for a 2022 Amazon television program of the same name.

In the 1990s, audiences were shocked when Jewish comedian and Full House actor Bob Saget performed at Phat Tuesdays. Torry had booked Saget for the night's show.

== Filmography ==
=== Film ===
Year	Title	Role	Notes
1996	Don't Be a Menace to South Central While Drinking Your Juice in the Hood	Doo Rag's Father	
1996	Sunset Park	Boo Man	
1997	Back in Business	Little Train	
1997	One Eight Seven	Voice in Crowd	
1998	Ride	Indigo	
1998	American History X	Lamont	
1999	Life	Radio	
1999	Trippin'	Fish	
1999	Introducing Dorothy Dandridge	First Actor	TV movie
2001	The Animal	Miles	
2001	Tara	Courtney	Video
2001	Pearl Harbor	Teeny Mayfield	
2001	Don't Say a Word	Dolen	
2003	With or Without You	Greg	
2003	Jonah	The Demon	Short
2003	Runaway Jury	Eddie Weese	
2005	Slow Burn	Chet Price	
2005	Midnight Clear	Michael Pressmore	Short
2006	Funny Money	Angel	
2006	The Last Stand	Reg	
2006	Dead and Deader	Judson	TV movie
2010	Screwball: The Ted Whitfield Story	Reverend Cash	
2010	Darnell Dawkins: Mouth Guitar Legend	Quentin	
2013	Chocolate Coins	Plen T Ful	Short
2015	Axe to Grind	Eddie Wilcox	
2015	Civilian Life	Dr. Miles Jackson	
2023	Hope Street Holiday	Walter Johnson	

=== Television ===
Year	Title	Role	Notes
1993	Family Matters	Student	Episode: "Hell Toupee"
1995	Martin	Martin Look-a-Like	Episode: "High Noon"
1996	Sparks	Rapper	Episode: "Goode for the Gander"
1997–98	Good News	Little T	Main Cast
1999–2000	The Strip	Jesse Weir	Main Cast
2000	Happily Ever After: Fairy Tales for Every Child	Huge (voice)	Episode: "The Steadfast Tin Soldier"
2000	The X-Files	Shorty	Episode: "Redrum"
2000–04	As Told By Ginger	Will Patterson (voice)	Recurring Cast: Season 1–2, Guest: Season 3
2001	NYPD Blue	Tory Jameson	Episode: "Franco, My Dear, I Don't Give a Damn"
2002	The Shield	Marlon Demeral	Episode: "Our Gang"
2002	One on One	Flim-Flam	Episode: "I Believe I Can Fly: Part 1"
2005	Blind Justice	Eddie	Episode: "Pilot"
2014	Married, for Real?!	Sonny	Episode: "The Issue"
2024	Mind Your Business	Date #2	Episode: "A Little White Lie"
