= Sprung (film) =

- Theatrical release poster
- Directed by: Rusty Cundieff
- Written by: Rusty Cundieff; Darin Scott
- Produced by: Darin Scott
- Starring: Tisha Campbell; Rusty Cundieff; Paula Jai Parker; Joe Torry
- Cinematography: João Fernandes
- Edited by: Lisa Bromwell
- Music by: Stanley Clarke
- Distributed by: Trimark Pictures
- Release date: May 14, 1997
- Running time: 105 minutes
- Country: United States
- Language: English
- Box office: $7,575,028

Sprung is a 1997 comedy film written by Rusty Cundieff and Darin Scott, directed by Cundieff and starring Tisha Campbell, Cundieff, Paula Jai Parker and Joe Torry.

== Plot ==
In the 1990s Pittsburgh, Montel (Rusty Cundieff) and Clyde (Joe Torry) are friends who could not be less alike. An introverted photographer, Montel wants to meet the one right girl for him and settle down to build a family, while Clyde is a flamboyant womanizer just out for a good time.

At a party, they meet Adina (Paula Jai Parker), a sexy golddigger seeking a wealthy husband with robotic determination, and her shy law clerk friend Brandy (Tisha Campbell). The couples pair off in predictable combinations, but while the brief encounter between Clyde and Adina quickly implodes when she discovers that Clyde's success is an act and his Porsche is borrowed, the relationship between Montel and Brandy blooms into a true romance. Eventually, they decide to move in together, motivating Clyde and Adina to reunite in a selfish scheme to break their best friends up, using whatever treacherous means they can employ.

== Cast ==
- Tisha Campbell as Brandy
- Rusty Cundieff as Montel
- Paula Jai Parker as Adina
- Joe Torry as Clyde
- Moon Jones as Godzilla Nuts Suspect
- Bobby Mardis as Foreign Suspect
- John Witherspoon as Detective
- Jennifer Lee as Veronica
- Clarence Williams III as Grand Daddy
- Loretta Jean as Bride's Mother
- Ronnie Willis as Party Guard
- John Ganun as Patrol Officer #1
- David McKnight as Patrol Officer #2
- Ron Brooks as Watch Commander
- Nick LaTour as Dancing Older Man
- Darin Scott as Inconsiderate Husband
- Isabel Sanford as Sista #1
- Angela Means as Sista #2
- Yolanda "Yo-Yo" Whitaker as Sista #3
- Homeselle Joy as Sista #4 (as Homselle Joy)
- Sherman Hemsley as Brotha #1
- Reynaldo Rey as Brotha #2
- Mark Christopher Lawrence as Brotha #3
- Tim Hutchinson as Brotha #4
- Freda Payne as Vocalist

== Reception ==
On the review aggregator website Rotten Tomatoes, 20% of 10 critics' reviews are positive, with an average rating of 4.2/10. Roger Ebert gave Sprung a negative review of 1 and a half stars out of four, praising the characters of Montel and Brandy as well-written and charming, but criticizing the rest of the film as tonally inconsistent and existing "only in the terms of screenplay cliches."
