= Wayne Dehart =

American film, stage and television actor

- Occupations: Film, stage and television actor
- Years active: 1987–present

Wayne Dehart is an American film, stage and television actor. He is best known for playing Mack in the 1993 film A Perfect World.

Dehart appeared in films such as RoboCop 2, They Still Call Me Bruce, Dark Angel, The Stars Fell on Henrietta, The Peanut Butter Falcon and Looper. He also guest-starred in television programs including Walker, Texas Ranger, Tropical Cop Tales (8 episodes), Hap and Leonard, Houston Knights, Prison Break and Breaking Bad (in the episode "Blood Money"). In 1991, he appeared in the stage play Driving Miss Daisy.

== Filmography ==
Film
Year(s)	Title	Role	Notes
1987	They Still Call Me Bruce	Pimp #1	
1990	I Come in Peace	Market Customer	
1990	Black Snow	Maurice Childress	
1990	RoboCop 2	Vendor	
1992	Rich in Love	Sam Poole	
1993	A Perfect World	Mack, the Farmer	
1994	Jason's Lyric	Street Preacher	
1995	The Stars Fell on Henrietta	Robert	
1995	Once Upon a Time...When We Were Colored	Brother Stanley	
1996	A Time to Kill	Claude	
1997	The Apostle	Liquor Store Preacher	
2003	Road Kings	Voodoo Man	
2003	Gang of Roses	Willyum	
2004	Street Tales of Terror	Homeless Man - The Storyteller	
2008	The Longshots	Mr. Peppers	
2010	The Great American Moon Rock Caper	Robbie	
2012	Looper	Seth Vagrant	
2014	The Bag Lady	Papo	
2018	Tales from the Hood 2	Mr. Winters	
2019	The Peanut Butter Falcon	Blind Jasper John	

Television
Year(s)	Title	Role	Notes
1987	Houston Knights	Bookie	Episode: "Mirrors"
1990	Elvis	Moody Williams	Episode: "Moody's Blues"
1993	American Experience	Rev Rovey	Episode: "Simple Justice"
1995	American Gothic	Bertie	Episodes: "Inhumanitas" and "The Buck Stops Here"
1995–96	Walker, Texas Ranger	Doc, Clarkson	Episodes: "Lucky" and "Collision Course"
2006–07	Prison Break	Vagrant	Episode: "Wash" and "Scan"
2013	Breaking Bad	Homeless Man	Episode: "Blood Money"
