= Rusty Cundieff =

American actor and filmmaker (born 1960)

- Born: George Arthur Cundieff; December 13, 1960 (age 65); Pittsburgh, Pennsylvania, U.S.
- Occupations: Actor, film director, producer, writer
- Years active: 1984–present
- Known for: Fear of a Black Hat; Tales from the Hood; Sprung; Chappelle's Show

George Arthur "Rusty" Cundieff (born December 13, 1960) is an American film and television director, actor, and writer known for his work on Fear of a Black Hat (1993), Tales from the Hood (1995), and Chappelle's Show (2003–2006).

== Biography ==
Cundieff was born in Pittsburgh, Pennsylvania to Christina and John A. Cundieff. He had an interest in the entertainment business from a young age, and he started doing standup comedy in his junior year of high school. He studied his freshman year at Loyola University in New Orleans before transferring to the University of Southern California. He wanted to attend USC for the film department but found it "actually pretty crappy" and thus took filmmaking classes while not being a film major. He graduated with degrees in philosophy of religion, journalism, and drama. While at USC, Cundieff became a member of Alpha Phi Alpha, a historically African American fraternity.

He is married to Trina Davis Cundieff, with whom he has two children: Simone Christina and Thelonious Jon Davis.

== Film career ==
After graduating from USC in 1982, Cundieff performed stand-up comedy in Los Angeles while looking for opportunities to act. His first major role was a year-long run as Theo Carver on Days of Our Lives in 1985. In 1988, he played Big Brother Chucky in Spike Lee's School Daze. Cundieff was inspired by his experience working with Lee on the film to pursue writing and directing in addition to acting, and at age 29 he wrote, directed, and starred in the well-received 1993 rap parody Fear of a Black Hat.

He directed and co-wrote the 1995 horror anthology Tales from the Hood. He directed sequels in 2018 and 2020, Tales from the Hood 2 and Tales from the Hood 3, projects that he said he had been trying to make for 20 years, but that the success of Get Out had opened the door for.

Cundieff was also a correspondent on Michael Moore's comic TV magazine show TV Nation in the mid-1990s.

In 2013, along with 12 others he received a Razzie Award for Worst Director for directing a segment in the anthology comedy film Movie 43.

== Filmography ==
=== Actor ===
Film credits
Year	Film	Role	Notes
1984	Welcome to the Fun Zone	Host	TV movie
1986	3:15	M-16's	
1987	Hollywood Shuffle	Audition Actor / Slave #1 / Zombie Pimp	
1988	School Daze	Big Brother Chucky	
1992	Eddie Presley	Guard	
1993	Fear of a Black Hat	Ice Cold	Also writer and director.
1995	Tales from the Hood	Richard	Also writer and director.
1997	Sprung	Montel	Also writer and director.
2003	The Devon Taylor Show	Ice Cold	TV movie
2018	Tales from the Hood 2	Press Conference Reporter	Also writer and director.

Television credits
Year	Show	Role	Notes
1985	Days of Our Lives	Theo Carver	
1985	What's Happening Now!	J.B. Whitney	1 episode
1985	MacGruder and Loud	Perry	1 episode
1990	thirtysomething	Student #5	1 episode
2003	Chappelle's Show	Ystur Feidnuc D.D.S. / Richard Pryor	2 episodes

=== Director ===
Film and television director
Year	Film	Notes
1993	Fear of a Black Hat	
1995	Tales from the Hood	
1996	Clueless	1 episode
1997	Sprung	
2000	The New Adventures of Spin and Marty: Suspect Behavior	TV movie
2005	Bitch House	
2006	The Bernie Mac Show	1 episode
2006	So Notorious	1 episode
2003-2006	Chappelle's Show	25 episodes
2006	The Brandon T. Jackson Show	TV movie
2006	Campus Ladies	1 episode
2007	Human Giant	3 episodes
2008	Somebodies	4 episodes
2008	Chocolate News	Segment director, 12 episodes
2009-2010	The Wanda Sykes Show	Segment director, 21 episodes
2013	Movie 43	Segment director, "Victory's Glory"
2013	Second Generation Wayans	3 episodes
2013	The Devon Taylor Show	TV movie
2013	The Hustle	2 episodes
2018	Tales from the Hood 2	director
2019	Black Jesus	2 episodes
2020	Tales from the Hood 3	director
2021	Creepshow	2 episodes
2023	57 Seconds	director
2024	Meet Me Next Christmas	director
