= Aleksey Mitrofanov =

Russian politician (born 1962)

- Алексей Митрофанов
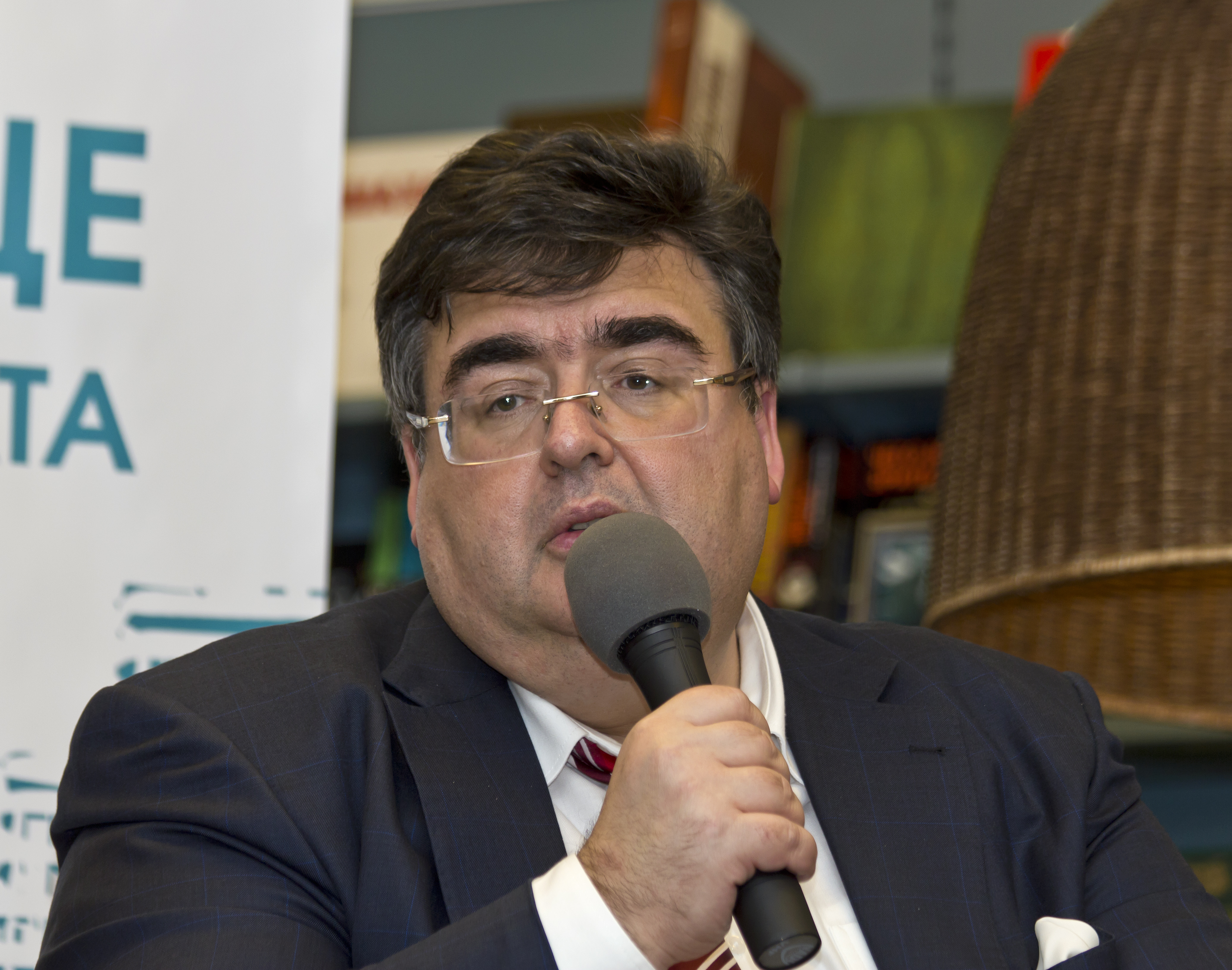
- Mitrofanov in 2013

Member of the State Duma
- In office 1993–2016

Personal details
- Born: 16 March 1962 (age 64) Moscow, Russian SFSR, Soviet Union
- Party: Independent (since 2012)
- Other political affiliations: LDPR (until 2007); A Just Russia (2007–2012)
- Spouse: Marina Lillevyali (m. 1993)
- Education: Moscow State Institute of International Relations; Institute for US and Canadian Studies
- Occupation: Politician
- Website: alexeymitrofanov.ru
- Mitrofanov's voice Mitrofanov discussing his academic career Recorded 13 December 2007

Aleksey Valentinovich Mitrofanov (Russian: Алексе́й Валенти́нович Митрофа́нов, transliterated as Alexei Mitrofanov; born 16 March 1962) is a Russian far-right politician who served as a member of the State Duma from 1993 to 2016. He was a high-ranking member of the Liberal Democratic Party of Russia and was the party's primary intellectual figure on geopolitics until he left in 2007, joining A Just Russia. He was expelled from that party in 2012 for voting in favour of the First Medvedev cabinet, and he subsequently sat as an independent. He was stripped of his parliamentary immunity and fled Russia in 2014 after being accused of extortion.

Mitrofanov is a co-author of the Dima Yakovlev Law and the Russian foreign agent law, and he professes a foreign policy based on the thinking of Karl Haushofer, advocating for an alliance between Russia, Germany, and Japan against the United States, United Kingdom, and Turkey. He supported the Taliban following the US invasion of Afghanistan and advocated for the usage of nuclear weapons to prevent American military interventions during the prelude to the Iraq War. He voted in favour of the 2014 Russian annexation of Crimea and has advocated for the reformation of Russia into a unitary state centred around the concept of Moscow, Third Rome.

== Early life and education ==
Aleksey Valentinovich Mitrofanov was born on 16 March 1962 in Moscow. His parentage has been subject to conspiracy theories: Eduard Limonov, leader of the National Bolshevik Party, has claimed that Mitrofanov was the illegitimate son of Yuri Andropov. Mitrofanov himself encouraged this, proposing the erection of a monument to Andropov at the Lubyanka Building in 2002 and claiming that he had received Andropov's "support and help". Other rumours published in the Russian tabloid press have claimed that he was the grandson of Andrei Gromyko. Mitrofanov was active in the Komsomol in his youth.

He holds degrees in international relations from the Moscow State Institute of International Relations and from the Institute for US and Canadian Studies of the Soviet Academy of Sciences.

== Political career ==
Mitrofanov unsuccessfully ran in the 1999 Moscow mayoral election as a candidate of the Liberal Democratic Party of Russia (LDPR). His running mate was Andrey Brezhnev, the nephew of the Soviet leader Leonid Brezhnev. He also ran in the 2003 mayoral election, again unsuccessfully.

In 2005, co-wrote the script for a pornographic film titled Yuliya, which portrayed two politicians, named Yulia and Mikhail, having sex in a helicopter near the Georgia–Russia border. Mitrofanov stated that the figures in the film were based on the prime minister of Ukraine Yulia Tymoshenko and the president of Georgia Mikheil Saakashvili, both of whom are unpopular among Russian nationalists for their support of Atlanticism. In November 2008, he claimed that the 2008–2009 Ukrainian financial crisis would shut down Ukraine's industry and that this collapse would make Ukraine become a part of Russia.

Mitrofanov left the LDPR in August 2007 to join A Just Russia, led by Sergei Mironov. Opinion polls at the time suggested that the LDPR would fail to gain representation in the Duma following the December 2007 election, while A Just Russia was expected to gain seats. LDPR leader Vladimir Zhirinovsky said Mitrofanov's departure would actually improve Mitrofanov's former party image.

Mitrofanov stood as the top candidate for the Just Russia federal list in Penza during the 2007 Russian legislative election; he was not re-elected. In 2011, he was elected to the State Duma of the Russian Federation.

Mitrofanov, alongside Nikolai Lakutin, Leonid Levin, Dzhamaladin Gasanov, and Igor Zotov, voted to confirm the First Medvedev cabinet on 8 May 2012, in contradiction of a statement by A Just Russia leader Sergey Mironov urging party members not to do so. In response, Mitrofanov and Lakutin were expelled from the party; Levin, Gasanov, and Zotov, who were independent members of the A Just Russia faction, were likewise suspended from the faction. After his removal, Mitrofanov was the leader of a group (comprising members of A Just Russia) that attempted to form a parliamentary group of independents in favour of United Russia and president Vladimir Putin.

=== Political positions ===
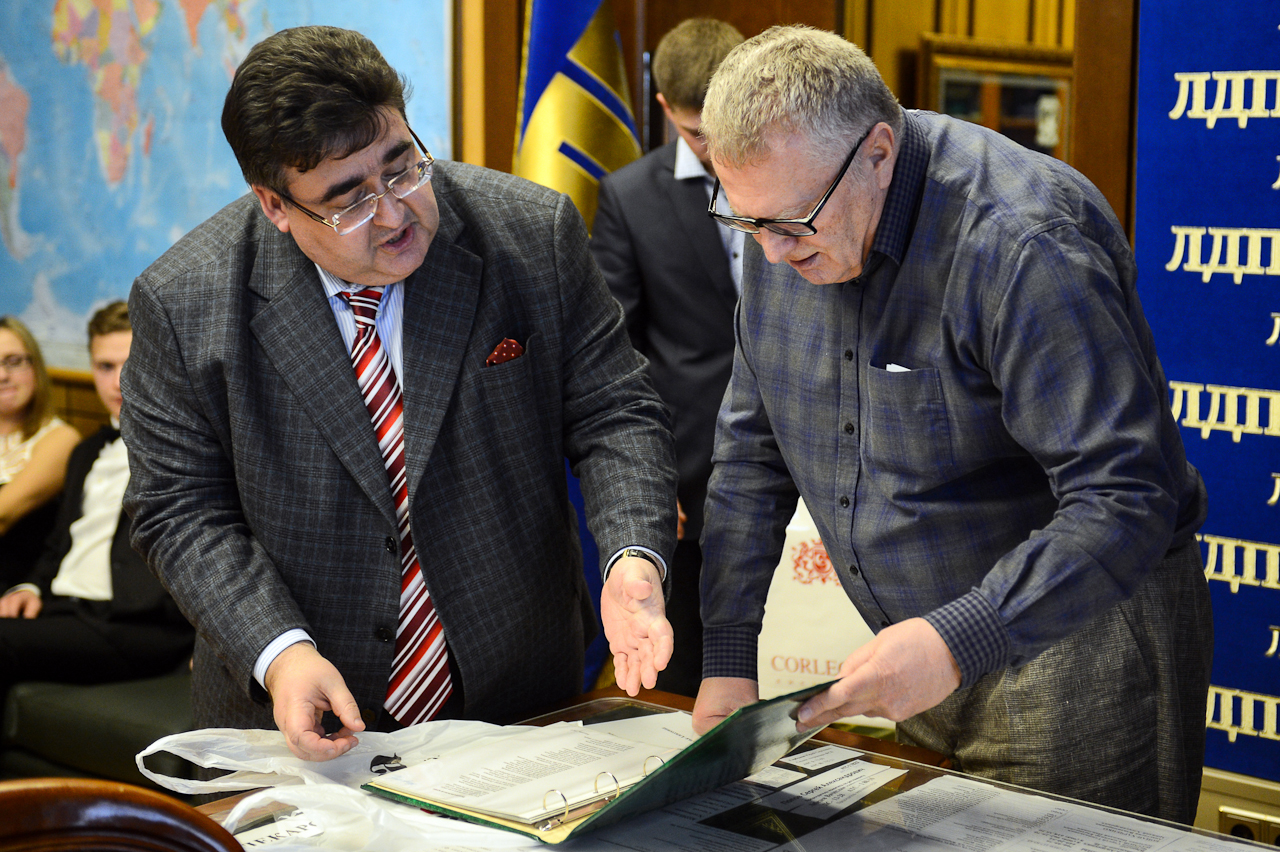
Prior to leaving the party, Mitrofanov was the "leading expert on geopolitics" in the Liberal Democratic Party of Russia

Mitrofanov was a co-author of the Dima Yakovlev Law and the Russian foreign agent law. He has supported abolishing the autonomous okrugs and republics, advocating for constitutional reforms to replace the federal government with a unitary state in April 2006. He has additionally criticised the usage of migrant workers in Russia, arguing for the restriction of migration from Central Asia, the South Caucasus, and China, in favour of increased usage of North Korean migrant workers.

As a member of the LDPR, Mitrofanov was the party's "leading expert on geopolitics", according to the academic John O'Loughlin, and he was chairman of the Duma's geopolitics committee. In the 1999 Russian legislative election, he advocated for the immediate annexation of Belarus, the partially recognised states of Abkhazia and South Ossetia, and northern Kazakhstan, into Russia. He advocated for an alliance between Russia, Germany, and Japan with support from China and India against NATO, which he believed was led by the United States, the United Kingdom, and Turkey. O'Loughlin has identified Mitrofanov's foreign policy views as based on Karl Haushofer's Geopolitik. Mitrofanov believes in the concept of Moscow, Third Rome, as central to establishing a unitary Russian state which, through joining the European Union, would create a "super-civilisation". Mitrofanov opposes the enlargement of NATO.

Mitrofanov has alleged that the First Chechen War was the result of a conspiracy between the bureaucracy and Russian oligarchs, who sought to prevent Chechens from benefiting from the privatisation process. Following the September 11 attacks and subsequent United States invasion of Afghanistan, Mitrofanov expressed support for the Taliban and argued that the Russian government should provide assistance to them, accusing the U.S. of orchestrating a humanitarian crisis. During the prelude to the Iraq War, he further advocated for the usage of nuclear weapons to prevent American attacks on Middle Eastern countries, and he was supportive of Saddam Hussein to the point that Israeli political scientist Ariel Cohen accused him and Zhirinovsky of being "on the payroll of Saddam Hussein and the Iraqi lobby". Mitrofanov voted for the 2014 Russian annexation of Crimea; Ilya Ponomarev, the only member of the Duma to vote against it, has claimed that Mitrofanov grabbed his hand and attempted to prevent him from voting.

Mitrofanov endorsed Moscow Pride on 11 May 2007, becoming the only major politician to do so, according to Human Rights Watch.

=== Accusations of extortion, exile ===
Mitrofanov was detained on 12 May 2013 at a hotel in Moscow, alongside two of his aides. His aides were arrested, while he was released due to parliamentary immunity. The Investigative Committee of Russia accused him of extorting US$200,000 from the Moscow businessman Vyacheslav Zharov. According to prosecutors, Zharov, who was engaged in a legal dispute over the construction of a skyscraper in Moscow, was approached by Mitrofanov's aides, who offered to use Mitrofanov's political status to ensure Zharov would win his court case. Zharov, believing that Mitrofanov intended to pocket the money, contacted the police, who arrested Mitrofanov's aides with evidence from a wiretap. Mitrofanov alleged that legal proceedings against him were politically motivated, arguing that he had never agreed to take a bribe from Zharov and that both Zharov and the Investigative Committee had acted illegally by recording the meeting through wiretaps and video. 431 members of the Duma voted in favour of stripping him of his parliamentary immunity; Vladimir Zhirinovsky was the only member of the Duma to speak against the vote, alleging that the claims of extortion were a conspiracy by A Just Russia in response to Mitrofanov's support for Dmitry Medvedev.

Mitrofanov was not present at the vote on the removal of his parliamentary immunity, citing illness. He later claimed that he was undergoing medical treatment abroad. Echo of Moscow stated that he had fled to Croatia, while Mitrofanov claimed to the Russian state news agency TASS that he would return to the Duma in late 2014. As of 2016, Mitrofanov remained in Croatia.

== t.A.T.u. Come Back ==
In 2006, Mitrofanov's book t.A.T.u. Come Back (Russian: ТАТУ КАМ БЭК) was published, a text message collection inspired by the band t.A.T.u. The novel was later made into a movie titled You and I, starring Mischa Barton, Anton Yelchin, and the two members of t.A.T.u., Lena Katina and Julia Volkova.
