= Anthony Griffith (actor) =

American actor and comedian

- Born: Anthony Griffith; November 3, 1962 (age 63); Chicago, Illinois
- Spouse: Dr. Brigitte Travis-Griffin

Comedy career
- Years active: 1980s-present
- Medium: stand-up; television; film

Anthony Griffith is an American actor and comedian from Chicago, Illinois. He gained popularity in the 1990s after appearing on The Tonight Show Starring Johnny Carson (1962-1992) several times. He also appears in Charlie’s Angels: Full Throttle (2003), The Curve (1998), and Panther (1995).

Griffith was born to a religious family in Chicago, Illinois, where he lived until he went to college in the 1980s. While in college he took up stand-up comedy.

While performing through the Los Angeles comedy club circuit, he was asked to perform for The Tonight Show Starring Johnny Carson a number of times. At the same time, his 2-year-old daughter's cancer had returned, eventually claiming her life, as tearfully recounted by Griffith in a deeply emotional episode of The Moth.

As an actor, he has had a number of roles, such as Tales from the Hood, Mario Van Peebles' Panther, The Curve and the television drama Our Father as well as a number of others. He received an Emmy for his performance in "Our Father".

He resides in Los Angeles, California.

He has multiple sclerosis.
