= You and I (2008 film) =

2008 drama film

- Theatrical release poster
- Directed by: Roland Joffé
- Screenplay by: Shawn Schepps; Luke Goltz; Andrew Cullen
- Based on: t.A.T.u. Come Back by Aleksey Mitrofanov and Anastasiya Moiseeva
- Produced by: Sergei Konov; Leonid Minkovski; Stephen Nemeth
- Starring: Mischa Barton; Anton Yelchin; Lena Katina; Julia Volkova; Charlie Creed-Miles; Helena Mattsson; Alexander Kaluzhsky; Bronson Pinchot; Shantel VanSanten
- Cinematography: Philip Robertson
- Edited by: Richard Nord
- Music by: Jeff Cardoni
- Production companies: Angels Kiss; RAMCO
- Distributed by: Central Partnership (Russia); Grindstone Entertainment Group (United States)
- Release dates: 16 May 2008 (Cannes Film Festival); 25 January 2011 (Russia); 31 January 2012 (United States)
- Running time: 100 minutes
- Countries: United States; Russia
- Languages: English; Russian
- Budget: $12 million
- Box office: $908,578

You and I (Russian: Ты и я; also known by its working title, Finding t.A.T.u.) is a 2008 drama film directed by Roland Joffé depicting a fictionalised version of real events adapted from the novel t.A.T.u. Come Back. The film features Mischa Barton, Anton Yelchin, Charlie Creed-Miles, Helena Mattsson, Alexander Kaluzhsky, Bronson Pinchot and Shantel VanSanten in her feature film debut. The film is about a teenage girl, Lana, who moves from a rural town in Russia to Moscow, completely unaware that meeting an internet girlfriend, Janie, will result in a string of adventures.

Casting and filming began in May 2007, and it premiered at the Cannes Film Festival in May 2008. The film was released in the United States on 31 January 2012. Despite the film not being released to mainstream film critics, You and I received mixed reviews from film critics.

== Plot ==
Janie Sawyer, an American teenager, is forced to live in Moscow because of her father's job. Janie is trying to escape her lonely life in Moscow through her deep love of music and the internet. Janie and Lana Starkova meet on a fansite for the pop-band t.A.T.u. Trapped in a small Russian town, Lana wants desperately nothing more than to flee her mundane life causing the two girls to develop an instant connection through their love of t.A.T.u.'s music. The two girls adapt one of Lana's poems into a song and post it on the internet. t.A.T.u.'s manager hears the song being played by a corrupt music producer and he loves it. He later contacts the girls, instead of the producer, hoping they will allow t.A.T.u. to record the song without the producer. Janie and Lana's relationship then becomes the catalyst for a series of adventures through both the rock bottom and highlights of Moscow's society.

== Cast ==
- Mischa Barton as Lana Starkova
- Anton Yelchin as Edvard Nikitin
- Charlie Creed-Miles as Ian
- Helena Mattsson as Kira
- Alexander Kaluzhsky as Dima
- Bronson Pinchot as Torrino
- Shantel VanSanten as Janie Sawyer
- Lena Katina as herself
- Julia Volkova as herself
- Alika Smekhova as Mrs. Starkova

== Production ==
The film was first announced in October 2006 by Yulia Volkova during a press conference in Paris, who said at the time: "The script has already been written and now some questions on shooting are being considered." Aleksey Mitrofanov, the author of the novel on which the film is based, is playing a large part in the production of the film, as are t.A.T.u. The group will not be playing Janie and Lana in the film, but will play themselves. Prior to its release, Lena Katina and Julia Volkova (t.A.T.u.) stated that they believed You and I to be "scandalous". The girls continued on to say that the film did not deal with the "love and roses" (over-sentimentality, "cheesiness") often found in romantic dramas, and instead, it focused on the real scandal and hardships that come along with relationships.

Mitrofanov has mentioned that in selecting a director, they looked for one who knew the international market well, as they planned to release the film internationally. They turned to American production companies, and an English director, Roland Joffé, was chosen because of his Oscar-winning credentials. Principal photography began in the summer of 2007. The film was shot in Moscow (stage nine of the Mosfilm building), Yaroslavl, and in Los Angeles, California..

== Reception ==
=== Release and marketing ===
You And I had been pushed-back severely, but was eventually announced for releases. The film premiered at the 61st Cannes Film Festival in May 2008. On 25 January 2011 You And I premiered in Moscow, Russia. Mischa Barton, the lead actress of the film, decided to show up alongside t.A.T.u. to promote the film. The other lead, Shantel VanSanten, was reported to have been too busy to make an appearance at the premiere. On 16 October 2007, the official t.A.T.u. blog released a preview featuring clips from the film.

On 31 January 2012, You and I was released direct-to-dvd in the United States. Then in June 2012, You and I was released on DVD in Australia and New Zealand.

=== Critical response ===
You and I was not screened for most mainstream film critics, however overall, You and I received mixed reviews from most film critics. Josh Bell from Filmcritic.com gave it a mixed review, as he said "Already a somewhat fascinating (if also tiresome) time capsule of forgotten pop culture less than five years after it finished production." DvdVerdict gave it a mixed review, as he felt "You and I may flirt with some saucy, scandalous issues, but it ends up being as provocative as a revue at a retirement home. One imagines the elderly being more entertaining, however" and concluded saying "Guilty. Pop culture claptrap disguised as dramatic relevance."

World-L.com gave it a more detailed, yet mixed review. He praised the actors, describing them as "good". However, he felt the storyline and production was unusual, as he said "In itself, the movie is not bad and lay, no, it's more complicated." He praised Barton and VanSanten, whom he described as "very good", but described the screenplay: "what is present in their memories but rather the very rough draft screenplay that talks about everything and nothing is wrong and the bottom of things."
