= Nick LaTour =

American actor (1928–2011)

- Born: Edgar Daniel Nixon Jr. August 1, 1928; Montgomery, Alabama, U.S.
- Died: February 28, 2011 (aged 82); Los Angeles, California, U.S.
- Other name: Nick La Tour
- Occupation: Actor
- Years active: 1976–2011

Edgar Daniel Nixon Jr. (August 1, 1928 – February 28, 2011), better known by his stage name Nick LaTour, was an American television, film, and stage actor. LaTour was the son of African American civil rights leader Edgar Daniel Nixon and his wife, Alease Curry Nixon. On February 28, 2011, LaTour died of cancer at the age of 82.

== Filmography ==
Year	Title	Role	Notes
1976	The Jeffersons	Reverend Perry	1 episode
1976	Good Times	Reverend Gordon	1 episode
1977	Quincy, M.E.	Wilson	1 episode
1977	What's Happening!!	Reverend Bailey	1 episode
1978	King	Man #1	Miniseries
1978	Baby, I'm Back	Justice of the Peace; Minister	3 episodes
1979	The White Shadow	Skycap	1 episode
1985	Berrenger's	Janitor	1 episode
1986	Highway to Heaven	Bill/Janitor	1 episode
1987	Big Bad Mama II	Doc Robey	
1987–1990	227	New Guard; Reverend Pinckney; Guard	3 episodes
1988	Fatal Judgment	Eddie	Television movie
1989	In the Heat of the Night	Travis Hawnwell	1 episode
1989	Homer and Eddie	Bar Customer	
1990	Beauty and the Beast	Clarence	1 episode
1990	Tales from the Crypt	Doctor	1 episode
1990	Good Grief		1 episode
1990	Cold Dog Soup	The Bokor	
1992	Deep Cover	Republican Congressman	
1993	Martin	Man in Audience #1	1 episode
1994	Seinfeld	Anna's grandfather	1 episode
1994	Lois & Clark: The New Adventures of Superman	Ferris Wheel Operator	1 episode
1994	Don Juan DeMarco	Nicholas, the Doorman	
1995	Murder, She Wrote	Charlie	1 episode
1996	ER	Old Man at Fire	1 episode
1996	Hangin' with Mr. Cooper	Milkbone	1 episode
1996	Married... with Children	Old Man	1 episode
1996	Jingle All the Way	Counterman	Credited as Nick La Tour
1997	Sprung	Dancing Older Man	
1997	Living Single	Church Man	1 episode
1997	NYPD Blue	Lee	1 episode
1998	The Gregory Hines Show	Junior	1 episode
1998	The Steve Harvey Show	Mr. Austin	1 episode
1998	The Jamie Foxx Show	Santa Claus	1 episode
1999	Clueless	Reverend Mayo	1 episode
1999	The Parent 'Hood	Old Man	1 episode
2000	Touched by an Angel	Pepper	1 episode
2000	The District	Baptist Minister	1 episode
2002	The Rosa Parks Story	Old Boycott Man	Television movie
2002	Any Day Now		1 episode
2003	A.U.S.A.	Fitzie	1 episode
2004	The Tracy Morgan Show	Mr. Rooney	1 episode
2008	The Sarah Silverman Program	Mr. Ivy	1 episode
2010	Elevator Girl	Harry	Television movie
2011	Eagleheart	Homeless Man	1 episode
