= Samuel Monroe Jr. =

American actor (1973–2026)

- Born: November 28, 1973; Los Angeles, California, U.S.
- Died: August 26, 2026 (aged 52); Burbank, California, U.S.
- Occupation: Actor
- Years active: 1992–2026

Samuel Monroe Jr. (November 28, 1973 – August 26, 2026) was an American actor and rapper under the name Caffeine.

== Career ==
Monroe acted in numerous films including Menace II Society (1993), Tales from the Hood (1995), Set It Off (1996), and The Players Club (1998), and appeared in television series including Out All Night (1993), and NYPD Blue (1996).

Monroe was also a rapper and performed as Caffeine. He was a part of the group Da Hoodstas alongside Drano and Lil D with whom he released an album called "Hoodsta Madness" in 1994 under Strictly Lethal Records. In 2000, he released his only solo album Things In The Game Done Changed, under Jive Records, Zomba Records and Goodfellas Entertainment. The album featured many notable artists including Kurupt, Noreaga and Too Short, as well as production from Battlecat and Jazze Pha among others.

== Death ==
On April 27, 2026, Monroe's family reported he was on life support due to meningitis. On August 27, his mother, Joyce Patton, announced that he died the previous day after being hospitalized at the Providence Saint Joseph Burbank Medical Center. He was 52.

== Filmography ==
=== Film ===
Year	Title	Role	Notes
1993	Menace II Society	Ilena's Cousin	
1995	Tales from the Hood	Bulldog	
1996	Don't Be a Menace to South Central While Drinking Your Juice in the Hood	Sam	
1996	Set It Off	Lorenz	
1998	The Players Club	Junior	
2004	Choices 2	AC	
2005	County General	T-Bone	
2006	Detroit G Code	Ray	
2012	What Goes Around Comes Around	Stan	
2014	Behind De Pole	James	
2017	The Fighters Prayer	Johnson	
2017	Hogan	Johnson	
2019	7th and Westlake: Nino's Revenge	AK	
2019	I Got the Hook Up 2	Poncho	
2019	The Lick Movie	Kilo	
2019	Payment Received	White Masked Killer / Cashier	
2020	She Ball	Kill Bill	
2021	Lockdown 2025	The Intruder	
2021	Blood Sacrifice	Trusted	
2022	Shine Kings	Zero	

=== Television ===
Year	Title	Role	Notes
1992, 1993	Out All Night	Dion	2 episodes
1995	Murder One	Trey	Episode: "Chapter Seven"
1996	NYPD Blue	Brother #3 / Punk #2	2 episodes
1997	Smart Guy	Warren	Episode: "Lab Rats"
1998	The Steve Harvey Show	Backup singer	Episode: "White Men Can Funk"
2003	The Lyon's Den	Man	Episode: "Hubris"
2012	Southland	Tank	Episode: "God's Work"
2015	Mann and Wife	Slim Sauce	Episode: "Mann's Payback"
2019	Black Jesus	Parolee #3 / Nutty	2 episodes

== Discography ==
Studio Albums

- Hoodstas Madness with Da Hoodstas (1994)
- Things In The Game Done Changed (2000)
