= Shantel VanSanten =

American actress and model (born 1985)

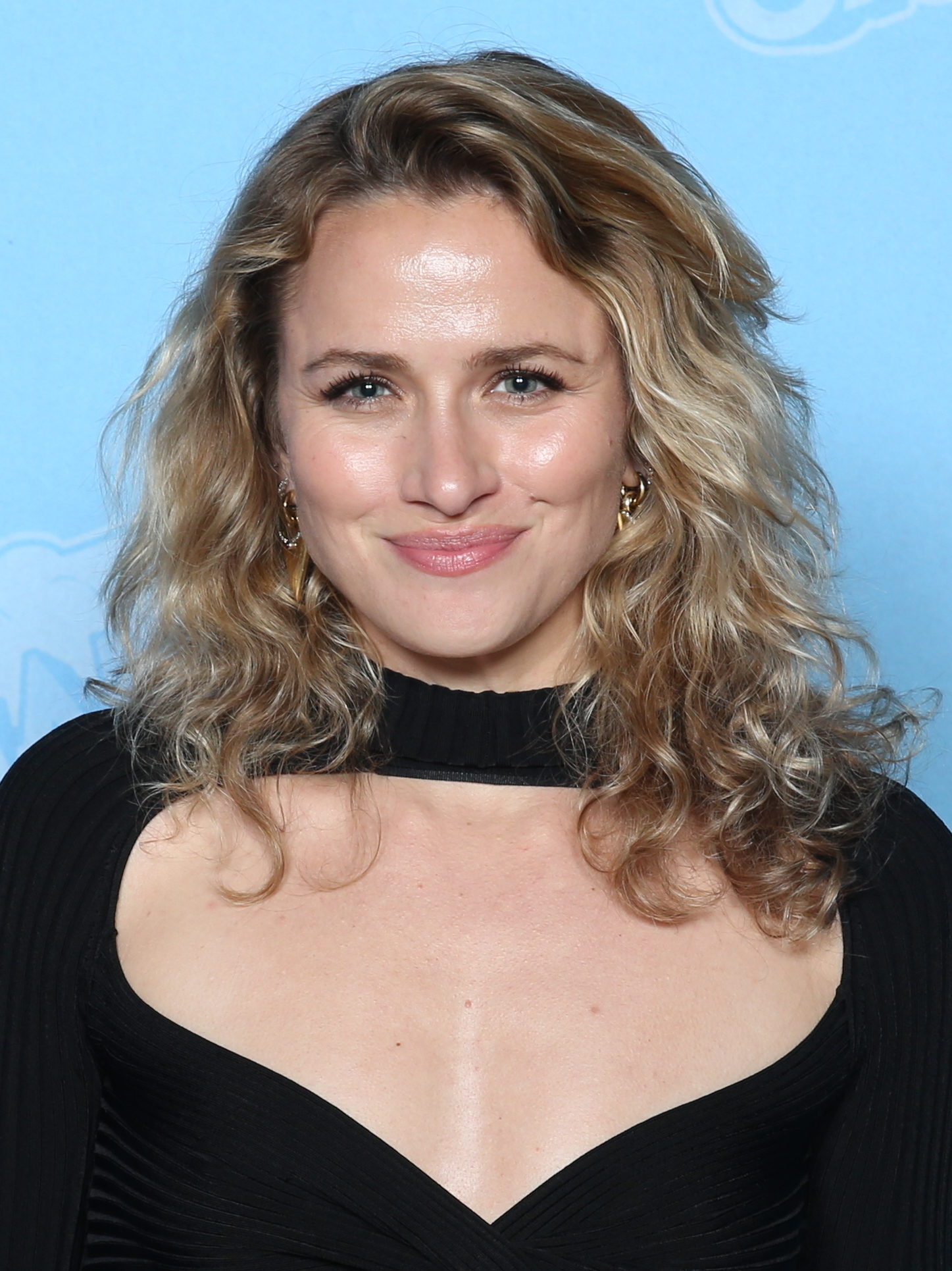
- VanSanten in 2022
- Born: July 25, 1985 (age 41); Luverne, Minnesota, U.S.
- Occupations: Actress; model
- Years active: 1999–present
- Spouse: Victor Webster (m. 2021; div. 2024)

Shantel VanSanten (born July 25, 1985) is an American actress and model. On television, she played Quinn James in the CW teen drama series One Tree Hill; recurred as Becca Butcher in the Amazon Prime Original The Boys; and starred as Julie Swagger, the wife of lead character Bob Lee Swagger on the USA Network series Shooter. On film, she has appeared in The Final Destination, You and I, and Something Wicked. From 2019 to 2026, VanSanten starred as Karen Baldwin in the Apple TV+ science fiction space drama series For All Mankind.

== Early life ==
VanSanten was born in Luverne, Minnesota. She is of Dutch and Norwegian descent. VanSanten was raised in Spring, Texas, where she attended Incarnate Word Academy, an all-girls college prep school in Houston; and Texas Christian University in Fort Worth, Texas. VanSanten started her career as a model at the age of 15 for the Page Parkes Management.

== Career ==
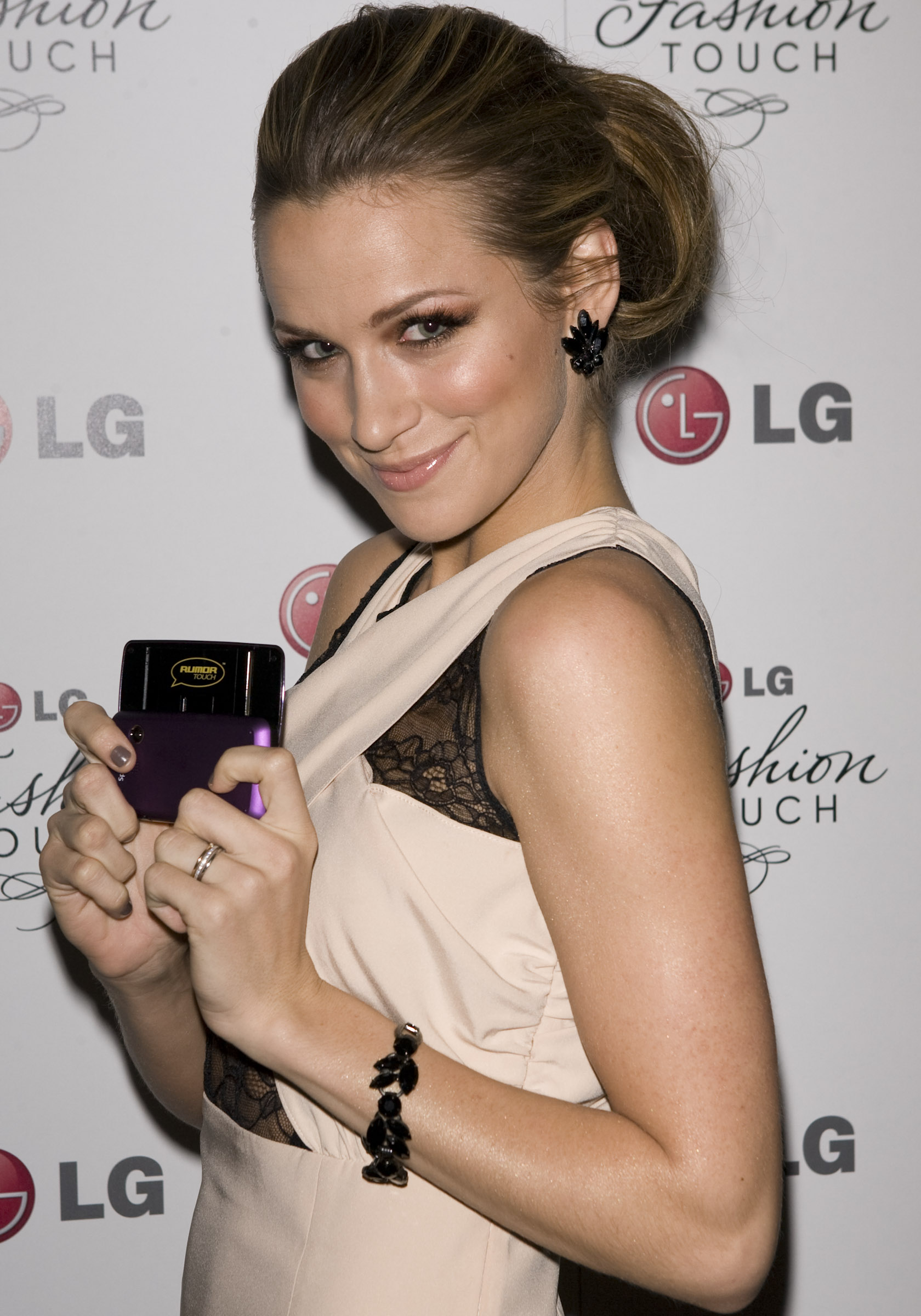
VanSanten in 2010

VanSanten appeared as a finalist on NBC's reality television series Sports Illustrated: Swimsuit Model Search but was eliminated in the series' first episode. In 2007, she signed onto a film adaptation of the novel t.A.T.u. Come Back. Filming took place that year in Los Angeles and Moscow. She starred alongside Mischa Barton in the film, which premiered in Russia on January 25, 2011, and as You and I in the United States a year later.

In 2009, VanSanten appeared as Lori Milligan in The Final Destination, the fourth installment of the eponymous horror film franchise. That same year, VanSanten was cast as a series regular on The CW television drama series One Tree Hill in the show's seventh season. She portrayed photographer Quinn James and the on-screen sibling to Bethany Joy Lenz's character. VanSanten's work on the series continued until the series' ninth and final season; her final appearance was in the series' 187th and final episode. BuddyTV ranked her #24 on its "TV's 100 Sexiest Women of 2010" list, and #21 in 2011.

VanSanten starred as Christine in Something Wicked, the last film to feature actress Brittany Murphy, who portrays VanSanten's sister-in-law Susan. In spring 2012, VanSanten shot Golden Christmas 3—a family-oriented holiday romantic comedy directed by Michael Feifer—opposite Rob Mayes, Mark Famiglietti, Nikki DeLoach and Orson Bean. She portrayed Vera Buckley on the television series The Messengers, which was cancelled after one season. VanSanten portrayed Patty Spivot in the second season of The CW Arrowverse TV series The Flash, based on the DC Comics character of the same name. She was Detective Joe West's (Jesse L. Martin) new protégée, the only member of his new metahuman task force at the Central City Police Department besides Cisco Ramon (Carlos Valdes), and a brief love interest of Barry Allen (Grant Gustin).

From 2016 to 2018, VanSanten co-starred in the USA Network drama series Shooter, playing Julie Swagger, the wife of lead character Bob Lee Swagger. She guest-starred as Amy in the final season of the CBS television Scorpion in 2017. VanSanten played the role of Rebecca Butcher in the first two seasons of the Amazon Prime Video series The Boys. From 2019 to 2023, VanSanten has starred as Karen Baldwin in the Apple TV+ original science fiction space drama series For All Mankind. Also in 2019, she provided the voice of the character Wraith in the video game Apex Legends. From 2022 to 2023, VanSanten recurred in the role of Special Agent Nina Chase during the fourth and fifth seasons of the CBS procedural series FBI, while series star Missy Peregrym was on maternity leave.

== Personal life ==
On February 9, 2021, VanSanten became engaged to actor Victor Webster after meeting on the set of Love Blossoms in 2016. They married in October 2021. In January 2023, Webster filed for divorce after less than two years of marriage. The divorce was finalized on July 2, 2024.

== Filmography ==
=== Film ===
Year	Title	Role	Notes
2006	Savage Spirit	Lori	Direct-to-video film
2008	You and I	Janie Sawyer	
2008	The Open Door	Opening scene daughter	
2009	The Final Destination	Lori Milligan	
2011	In My Pocket	Sophie	
2011	Remembrance	Rebecca Levine	
2014	Something Wicked	Christine	Filmed in 2009
2022	American Murderer	Jamie Brown	

=== Television ===
Year	Title	Role	Notes
1999	Steel Angel Kurumi	Kaori	Voice role (English version)
2005	Three Wise Guys	Beautiful girl	Television film
2009	CSI: NY	Tara Habis	Episode: "She's Not There"
2009–2012	One Tree Hill	Quinn James	Main role (seasons 7–9)
2012	A Golden Christmas 3	Heather Hartly	Television film
2013	Beauty & the Beast	Tyler	3 episodes
2013	The Glades	Jackie	Episode: "Yankee Dan"
2014	Gang Related	Jessica Chapel	Main role
2015	The Night Shift	Chloe	Episode: "Eyes Look Your Last"
2015	The Messengers	Vera Buckley	Main role
2015–2016	The Flash	Patty Spivot	Recurring role (season 2); 10 episodes
2016	Rush Hour	Victoria	Episode: "Familee Ties"
2016	Timeless	Kate Drummond	Episode: Pilot
2016–2018	Shooter	Julie Swagger	Main role
2017	Love Blossoms	Violet Chappel	Television film
2018	Scorpion	Amy Berkstead	Episodes: "The Bunker Games", "Wave Goodbye"
2019–2020; 2024	The Boys	Becca Butcher	Recurring role (seasons 1–2, 4)
2019–2026	For All Mankind	Karen Baldwin	Main role (seasons 1–3), guest (seasons 4–5)
2022-2026	FBI	Special Agent Nina Chase	Recurring role (seasons 4–8)
2023	FBI: International	Special Agent Nina Chase	Episode: "Imminent Threat: Part One"
2023–2025	FBI: Most Wanted	Special Agent Nina Chase	Guest star (season 4), Main role (seasons 5–6)
2024–present	Invincible	Anissa, Viltrumites	Recurring voice role (seasons 2 & 4), 3 episodes
2026–present	R.J. Decker	Gertrude "Trudy" Harris	Recurring role (Season 2)

=== Music videos ===
Year	Title	Artist	Role
2011	"Fragile Bird"	City and Colour	Distressed woman
2014	"Amy"	Goodie Mob	Amy Anderson

=== Video games ===
Year	Title	Role	Notes
2019	Apex Legends	Wraith	Voice; playable character
2026	Invincible VS	Anissa	Voice; playable character
