= Patty Spivot =

- Patty Spivot as depicted in The Flash (vol. 4) #1 (November 2011). Art by Francis Manapul and Brian Buccellato.

Publication information
- Publisher: DC Comics
- First appearance: DC Special Series #1 "5-Star Super-Hero Spectacular" (September 1977)
- Created by: Cary Bates (writer); Irv Novick (artist)

In-story information
- Full name: Patricia "Patty" Spivot
- Team affiliations: Central City Police Department
- Notable aliases: Ms. Flash, Hot Pursuit
- Abilities: Superspeed through Cosmic Motorcycle; Proficient forensic scientist and investigator

Patricia "Patty" Spivot is a fictional character who appears in various DC Comics publications and was created by writer Cary Bates and artist Irv Novick. She is a friend and partner of the second Flash, Barry Allen. She first appeared in "Five-Star Super-Hero Spectacular" (DC Special Series #1, September 1977).

Spivot appeared as a recurring cast member on The CW television series second season of The Flash played by Shantel VanSanten. This version is a detective of the Central City Police Department. The character made her cinematic debut in the DC Extended Universe film The Flash, played by Saoirse-Monica Jackson.

== Fictional character biography ==
Patricia 'Patty' Spivot is the part-time lab assistant to police scientist Barry Allen in the Central City Police Department. She later becomes the police department's full-time forensic blood analyst.

After David Singh takes over the crime lab as director and begins to emphasize the quantity of the cases solved over quality, Patty decides to leave Central City for Blue Valley, Nebraska. However, she is called back into action by Barry Allen to investigate the death of Elongated Kid. At the crime scene, Barry and Patty find a young boy hiding in a shipping container and intend to interview him as a witness, but he refuses to open up to anyone but Patty. Shortly thereafter, the boy reveals himself to be Eobard Thawne. Thawne had been responsible for the death of Elongated Kid and threatens to kill Patty, but is thwarted by Flash, Kid Flash, and Hot Pursuit (an alternate version of Barry Allen).

=== Flashpoint ===
Patty, wanting to do something bigger with her life, steals Hot Pursuit's gear from the Central City Police Department. As Patty is fleeing on her motorcycle, her vehicle detects a timestorm and initiates an emergency chronal-evac that transports her to the year 3011. Patty is captured by Brainiac's forces and placed in a hibernation chamber, but manages to escape. Patty later encounters Kid Flash, who tells her that he was born in the 31st century. The future he and Patty are in is nothing like his time, meaning that something must have changed in the timeline. Patty tells him that her bike can travel through time but only if it has the Speed Force tank, so Kid Flash agrees to find it.

Bart lets himself be captured by Brainiac, who places him in a virtual reality chamber. Inside the chamber, Bart manages to rewrite several of Brainiac's programs, including his security systems. This allows Patty to enter the citadel and rescue Kid Flash. They manage to find the Speed Force tank, but Patty is impaled by Brainiac. Before dying, Patty smashes the tank, allowing Bart to regain his speed and escape to the past.

=== The New 52 ===
Patty Spivot was resurrected following the events of the "Flashpoint" storyline, which rebooted the continuity of the DC universe. In this new reality, Barry never marries with Iris West and enters a relationship with Patty. After the Future Flash incident, Barry and Patty break up.

== In other media ==
Patty Spivot (portrayed by Shantel VanSanten) as depicted in The Flash (2014)

- Patty Spivot appears in the second season of The Flash (2014), portrayed by Shantel VanSanten. This version is a uniformed police officer who intended to become a CSI, but joined the police force to seek revenge on Mark Mardon for murdering her father when she was a teenager. Over the course of the season, she helps Barry Allen / Flash and the Central City Police Department (CCPD) capture metahumans, enters a relationship with him, and forgoes her revenge, though she disagrees with his overprotective tendencies in the face of various enemies. After discovering Barry's secret identity, she breaks up with him, resolves to remain friends with him, and transfers to Midway City to become a CSI.
- Patty Spivot appears in The Flash (2023), portrayed by Saoirse-Monica Jackson. This version is a co-worker of Barry Allen and Albert Desmond. Additionally, an alternate reality version of Spivot who became Allen and Desmond's roommate makes a minor appearance.
