= Phat Tuesdays =

American television documentary series

- Genre: Docuseries
- Directed by: Reginald Hudlin
- Starring: Guy Torry; Tiffany Haddish; Steve Harvey; Snoop Dogg
- Country of origin: United States
- Original language: English
- No. of seasons: 1
- No. of episodes: 3

Production
- Executive producers: Jeff Bumgarner; Kelsey Grammer; Jeff Hasler; Reginald Hudlin; Brian Lovett; Byron Phillips; Jordan McMahon; Tom Russo; Guy Torry
- Production companies: Amazon Studios; Grammnet Productions; Original Productions; Phat Tuesday Productions

Original release
- Network: Amazon Prime Video
- Release: February 4, 2022

Phat Tuesdays: The Era of Hip Hop Comedy is an American television documentary series about the 1990s comedy showcase hosted and created by Guy Torry. It premiered on Amazon Prime Video on February 4, 2022.

== Summary ==
The series tells the story of Phat Tuesdays at The Comedy Store in Los Angeles. The event was founded and hosted by comedian Guy Torry from 1995 to 2005, to spotlight Black performers, and helped launch the careers of comedians including Steve Harvey, Chris Rock, and Martin Lawrence. It includes interviews with comedians and celebrities who were there, and previously unreleased footage of comedy sets. All three episodes are directed by Reginald Hudlin.

== Cast ==
- Guy Torry
- Regina King
- Tiffany Haddish
- Chris Tucker
- Anthony Anderson
- J. B. Smoove
- Snoop Dogg
- Steve Harvey
- Dave Chappelle
- Lil Rel Howery
- Pauly Shore
- Nick Cannon
- Cedric the Entertainer
- Tommy Davidson
- Bob Saget
- Marsha Warfield
- Jay Pharoah

== Episodes ==
No.	Title	Original release date
1	"Hood to Hollywood"	4 February 2022
After being shut out of white comedy clubs in the 1990s, Black comedians find a place at the Comedy Store after Guy Torry launches the weekly Phat Tuesdays event there.
2	"This Is How We Do It"	4 February 2022
The success of Phat Tuesdays increases the tension between Torry and his brother Joe.
3	"Who Got Next?"	4 February 2022
Phat Tuesdays becomes a beacon for female comedians. Legendary comedians break down what it takes to be funny.

== Release ==
The official trailer was released on January 20, 2022. The series premiered on Prime Video on February 4, 2022.
