= Tales from the Hood =

1995 American black horror anthology film

- Theatrical release poster
- Directed by: Rusty Cundieff
- Written by: Rusty Cundieff; Darin Scott
- Produced by: Darin Scott
- Starring: Corbin Bernsen; Rosalind Cash; Rusty Cundieff; David Alan Grier; Anthony Griffith; Wings Hauser; Paula Jai Parker; Joe Torry; Clarence Williams III
- Cinematography: Anthony B. Richmond
- Edited by: Charles Bornstein
- Music by: Christopher Young
- Production company: 40 Acres and a Mule Filmworks
- Distributed by: Savoy Pictures
- Release date: May 24, 1995
- Running time: 98 minutes
- Country: United States
- Language: English
- Budget: $6 million
- Box office: $11.8 million

Tales from the Hood is a 1995 American black horror anthology film directed by Rusty Cundieff (who also wrote the film with Darin Scott) and starring Corbin Bernsen, Rosalind Cash, Rusty Cundieff, David Alan Grier, Anthony Griffith, Wings Hauser, Paula Jai Parker, Joe Torry, and Clarence Williams III. The film presents four short horror stories based on problems that affect the African-American community: police corruption, domestic abuse, racism, and gang violence. These are presented within a frame story of three drug dealers buying some "found" drugs from an eccentric and story-prone funeral director.

The film was met with mixed reviews upon release but has since gained a cult following.

== Plot ==
=== "Welcome to My Mortuary" (Prologue) ===
Bulldog, Ball, and Stack are street criminals who have arrived at a local mortuary to purchase a stash of drugs from the eccentric and frantic director, Mr. Simms. He claims that he found the drugs in an alley, and has safely stored them in his mortuary. He asks the trio to help him get the stash, and as the four make their way through the building, he relates stories about some of the dead bodies in the funeral home.

=== "Rogue Cop Revelation" ===
During his first night on the job, rookie police officer Clarence Smith is taken by his partner, Newton Hauser, to the scene of what initially appears to be a routine traffic stop. When Smith runs the car's license plates, he learns that the man is Martin Ezekiel Moorehouse, a city councilman who has recently been on a crusade to eliminate local police corruption, specifically against officers who have initiated a rogue unit of narcotics trafficking. Smith attempts to intervene as Hauser and his fellow police officers Billy Crumfield and Richmond Strom beat Moorehouse with their nightsticks and vandalize his car. When Smith insists that Moorehouse should be taken to a hospital, the officers appear to agree. Smith tells Hauser that Crumfield and Richmond should be reported for what they did, but Hauser warns him against whistleblowing on fellow officers. Billy and Stromm drive Moorehouse's car to the docks, where they inject the battered Moorehouse with heroin. They plant a stash in his trunk, then push the car into the water with Moorehouse still inside. Moorehouse is posthumously labeled a hypocrite.

One year later, Smith has left the police force and is now a guilt-consumed alcoholic. On a walk in his neighborhood, he sees a mural of Moorehouse, and then has a vision of the crucified activist haunting him with the words "Bring them to me!" In response, Smith convinces the three police officers to meet him at Moorehouse's grave on the anniversary of the murder. Once there, Smith denounces the officers for killing Moorehouse and destroying his reputation. The officers begin to insult Moorehouse, with Richmond urinating on Moorehouse's grave and then ordering Crumfield to do the same thing. As Hauser and Richmond prepare to kill Smith to maintain their secrecy, an undead Moorehouse bursts from the grave to drag Crumfield beneath the ground by his genitals. Moorehouse's coffin bursts from the ground, opening to reveal Crumfield's mutilated corpse, with Moorehouse's resurrected form standing above the grave, clutching Crumfield's still-beating heart in his hand.

Richmond and Hauser open fire on Moorehouse, but the bullets have no effect, prompting them to flee in horror. A lengthy chase ensues, with the two cops fleeing by patrol car. As Hauser is driving the vehicle, Moorehouse jumps on top of the vehicle and decapitates Richmond. Terrified, Hauser exits his vehicle and shoots its gas tank, though the ensuing explosion doesn't rid him of Moorehouse. Moorehouse then chases Hauser into an alley, where he telekinetically throws used hypodermic needles into the cop's body, pinning him to Moorehouse's wall mural. Hauser melts into the mural, becoming a painting of himself crucified.

His vengeance nearly complete, Moorehouse accosts Smith, asking him why he did not help him when he was being beaten. The story ends with Smith in a mental hospital. Two orderlies outside his cell mention that he killed the officers and that he used to be a police officer himself. Moorehouse is never mentioned.

=== "Welcome to My Mortuary" (wraparound #1) ===
Stack, Ball, and Bulldog think Mr. Simms is crazy after hearing the story. They look into another casket. The contents are not seen but the gangsters recoil in shock and ask what happened to him. Mr. Simms tells them a story about a boy named Walter.

=== "Boys Do Get Bruised" ===
Walter Johnson is a quiet and sensitive boy who transfers to a new school one day with bruises around his cheek and eye. Walter's caring teacher Richard Garvey notices the bruises and talks to Walter. He initially thinks that the school bully Tyrone gave him the bruises. Although Tyrone has bullied Walter, Walter claims that the bruises came after he was attacked by a monster. A few days later, he shows up with a bruised arm. While the other children play, Walter sits inside and draws pictures of Tyrone and the monster. Walter explains to Garvey that he can overcome something he doesn't like, such as the monster he keeps talking about, by destroying an image of it. After Garvey leaves, Walter crumples up the drawing of Tyrone, causing the real Tyrone to suffer spontaneous injuries, which are blamed on fragile bones and a fall down some stairs.

Later that night, Garvey visits Walter's home and asks Walter's mother Sissy about the monster. Sissy claims that Walter's injuries are the result of his own clumsiness. She then tells Walter not to reveal anything about the monster to anyone else. Sissy's domineering boyfriend Carl comes home. Mr. Garvey eventually leaves. Seen through Walter's imagination, it is revealed that Carl is – in actuality – the "monster". Thinking that Walter is mocking him by drawing him as a monster, Carl begins to attack Walter and then hits and whips Sissy with a belt when she intervenes.

Garvey turns around to check on Walter and sees Carl beating Sissy through the window. Garvey runs into the house and begins to fight Carl. Carl badly injures Garvey and almost kills Sissy when she attempts to intervene. With Carl's attention elsewhere, Walter grabs the drawing he made of the monster, and begins to fold and crumple it. Carl's body crumples and collapses in a similar fashion. Sissy then stomps on the wadded-up paper to kill Carl. Knowing they will never be believed, Garvey gives the paper to Walter, who burns it. Sissy and Walter look on, relieved, as Carl's body burns.

=== "Welcome to My Mortuary" (wraparound #2) ===
Back in Simms's Funeral Home, Carl's burnt and mangled corpse is revealed to be inside the coffin. The gangsters close the casket, causing a doll to fall off a nearby shelf. For his next story, Mr. Simms shows them the doll, mentioning that he originally found it in a home in the Southern United States. Simms explains that it is not an ordinary doll, but a vessel for a lost soul.

=== "KKK Comeuppance" ===
Duke Metger is an obnoxious and highly racist Southern senator and a one-time member of the Ku Klux Klan who is currently running for governor. The senator is in his office filming a campaign commercial when he sees protesters outside the office. Jewish and African-American groups have teamed up to protest against Metger for being a racist, a former Klansman, and for setting up his office at an old slave plantation previously owned by his ancestor, Nathan Wilkes. One individual, Eli, tells the reporter that the plantation is haunted by dolls animated by the souls of Wilkes's previously tortured slaves, warning the news crews and everyone else at the scene that it is not a myth.

Meanwhile, Metger also discusses the myth of the tortured slaves with his African-American "image-maker" assistant Rhodie Willis. Metger explains how Wilkes, upon hearing that his slaves would be freed at the end of the Civil War, flew into a murderous rage and massacred all of them. The two notice a large painting of Miss Cobbs, the hoodoo witch who transferred the slaves' souls inside a number of small dolls that she created, surrounded by the dolls themselves, which Metger refers to as "Negro dolls". According to legend, the dolls are supposedly still in the house. One of the dolls is seen under the floorboard as Rhodie leaves. While Metger and Rhodie are working on Metger's media skills, Rhodie suddenly stumbles and falls down the stairs to his death. At the funeral, Eli warns Metger to leave the house before he ends up like Rhodie. In the limo after Rhodie's funeral, Metger notices the doll and orders his driver to pull over so he can throw the doll out the window and into the street.

Later, Metger re-watches Rhodie's footage and realizes that he died because he tripped over the doll. After noticing a blank spot on the painting, Metger comes in contact with the little doll itself, now animated, and has a fight with it. Metger is injured, but he manages to stop the doll by beating it with an American Flag. He also damages the painting with the flag, which starts to bleed. Metger takes the doll outside to his porch and ties it to a dart board. He then blasts the doll with his shotgun, and goes back inside to rant at the painting.

In the midst of his latest racist rant, Metger realizes more doll images in the painting have faded to white. Metger finds the previously blasted doll in the hallway, which attacks again and chases Metger into his office. Metger manages to lock the doll outside but sees that all of the dolls in the painting have faded to white. Terrified, Metger turns around to see an army of dolls, led by the same doll he blasted. He covers himself in the American flag as the dolls converge and devour him. Miss Cobbs then disappears from the painting and manifests herself in the room, holding the first doll in her arms, satisfied at the carnage taking place before them.

=== "Welcome to My Mortuary" (wraparound #3) ===
The dealers have grown impatient and ready for the drugs, not wanting to listen to any more of Mr. Simms's strange stories. Ball notices a corpse in another room, and alerts the others to come and see it. When Simms asks them if they knew the man inside the casket, Bulldog says that he was just someone they had seen around their neighborhood. Mr. Simms proceeds to explain the final moments of the man known as Crazy K.

=== "Hard-Core Convert" ===
Jerome "Crazy K" Johns is a hardened gangster who has killed many people mercilessly. He is driving down the streets when he encounters his rival Lil' Deke, whom he pursues and guns down. In retaliation, Lil' Deke's associates shoot at Crazy K, wounding him. Before they can finish him off, the police arrive at the scene and shoot the attackers. Crazy K, badly injured but still alive, is arrested and sent to prison, serving a life sentence without parole.

Four years later, Dr. Cushing arrives at Crazy K's prison cell and transfers him to her facility for an experimental trial, mentioning that he'll be released from prison if he agrees to it and completes it. Crazy K meets an inmate who happens to be a homicidal white supremacist that raves about killing black people and the end of days for blacks. This angers Crazy K and causes him to punch him in the face. The man then asks Crazy K the race of the victims he killed, silencing Crazy K. The man grows fond of him and he tells him that there will be a few black people who will be spared and kept as slaves as long as they think like him. Crazy K is told by Dr. Cushing that she purposely put him there to meet someone who is just like him. She then tells him that she has been hired by the government to administer a rehabilitation process on Crazy K, in hopes that he will change his ways. If he fails to redeem himself, he is told that he will rot in solitary confinement for the rest of his life. She admits that she ultimately doesn't care if he fails, seeing him as scum.

Crazy K is put through a process of torture to make him learn the consequences of his actions. First, his hair (with a "K" cut into the front) is shaved off. He is then loaded onto a gyroscopic modulator, forced to visualize images involving KKK members and actual photographs of lynching victims, interspersed with grisly, stylized footage of gang violence and his own actions. Dr. Cushing expounds on the fact that Crazy K killed many innocent black people without remorse or second thought.

For the next part of the trial, Crazy K is put into a sensory deprivation chamber, where he is confronted by the souls of the people he has killed, intentionally or otherwise, including his friends and an innocent little girl. Despite hinting at his own personal abuse in his childhood, Crazy K refuses to accept any responsibility for his crimes, and an illusion of Dr. Cushing tearfully warns him that he won't get another chance for forgiveness. Having refused the one opportunity to redeem himself, Crazy K is transported back to the moment when he was shot (revealing the whole sequence to have been a dream or hallucination). This time, he is finished off by the three gunmen, who leave his corpse abandoned in the street.

=== "Welcome to My Mortuary" (epilogue) ===
Following the telling of Crazy K's story, Stack, Ball, and Bulldog are revealed to be Crazy K's killers: in a heated turn of events, the dealers, having grown hostile to Simms and unnerved by the revelation that he knows their crime, threaten Simms, telling him he will be killed unless he gives them their drugs. Simms leads them deeper into the funeral home and tells them their "reward" is in three closed caskets. Each opens a casket to find his own corpse lying within, revealing that they have been dead the entire time.

After disarming them, Simms explains that after the murder of Crazy K, they were killed by Crazy K's associates in retaliation. Bulldog asks Simms how they can be dead when they are all seemingly alive, together in the same funeral home: Simms tells them that the funeral home is actually Hell and he morphs into a demonic creature, revealing himself to be Satan. The drug dealers scream in horror as the walls of the funeral home crumble to reveal an infernal hellscape that consumes them, left to burn with all the tortured souls while Satan laughs.

== Cast ==
Welcome to My Mortuary (framing segments)

- Clarence Williams III as Mr. Simms
- Joe Torry as "Stack"
- Samuel Monroe, Jr. as "Bulldog"
- De'Aundre Bonds as "Ball"

Rogue Cop Revelation

- Tom Wright as Martin Ezekiel Moorehouse
- Anthony Griffith as Officer Clarence Smith
- Wings Hauser as Officer Strom Richmond
- Michael Massee as Officer Newton Hauser
- Duane Whitaker as Officer Billy Crumfield

Boys Do Get Bruised

- Brandon Hammond as Walter Johnson
- Rusty Cundieff as Richard Garvey
- Paula Jai Parker as Sissy Johnson
- David Alan Grier as Carl

KKK Comeuppance

- Corbin Bernsen as Duke Metger
- Roger Guenveur Smith as Rhodie Willis
- Art Evans as Eli
- Tim Hutchinson as Councilman Rogers
- Christina Cundieff as Miss Cobbs
- John A. Cundieff as Funeral Priest
- Erika Hansen as Anchorwoman

Hard-Core Convert

- Lamont Bentley as Jerome "Crazy K" Johns
- Rosalind Cash as Dr. Cushing
- Ricky Harris as "Lil' Deke"
- Rick Dean as Racist Inmate

== Soundtrack ==
Year	Album	Peak chart positions		Certifications
Year	Album	U.S.	U.S. R&B	Certifications
1995	Tales from the Hood: The Soundtrack: Released: May 9, 1995; Label: 40 Acres and a Mule Musicworks/MCA Soundtracks	16	1	US: Gold

== Production ==
According to Cundieff, the idea for Tales from the Hood came from a one-act play he performed a few times in L.A. called The Black Horror Show: Blackanthropy. Shortly after the play wrapped, Cundieff said Darin Scott suggested they collaborate on a horror movie. "It has to be about something. It can't just be, 'We're scaring you'", Cundieff said.

The Tales from the Hood story "Boys Do Get Bruised" is loosely based on an incident from Cundieff's childhood. He remembered visiting a friend's house, who lived down the block from his childhood home in Pittsburgh, and seeing his friend's younger sister "gagged and hogtied" in the basement. Cundieff said he went home and told his dad, who was a detective in the juvenile division of the Pittsburgh police: "He said, 'I can't mess with those whites.' And he's probably right. He just felt that even with his badge and with his position, he wasn't in a position to deal with that", Cundieff told Jordan Gass-Pooré, host of the podcast Pod of Madness. "I've always had an interest, kind of in, I don't know if it was because of that moment, but child abuse, domestic violence is always, kind of had some weird place in my head."

Cundieff's parents appear in the story "KKK Comeuppance". His father is the preacher who gives the eulogy to Rhodie, and his mother portrays Miss Cobbs. Of his father's performance, Cundieff said, "He had written a sermon. I'm, like, 'You can't say all this.' ... And then, of course, when I called 'Action!' he, like, got all nervous." Cundieff noted that his mother had the opposite reaction, stating, "My mom was an introvert, but she was great. She had no problem. ... She didn't have any lines, but I told her, like, 'You know, look mad, like, you know, when you were angry at me', or something like that."

== Release ==
The film was released theatrically on May 24, 1995. Later that year, the film was released on VHS and LaserDisc by HBO. In 1998, HBO Home Video released the film on DVD, which has since gone out of print. According to Cundieff, Universal Pictures currently holds the rights to the film, but there were no prints available to reissue the film on the Blu-ray format in 2015. In 2016, a remastered version of the film was released to Amazon.com, iTunes and Crackle. In November 2016, it was announced that the film was to be made available on Blu-ray from Scream Factory, which was released on April 18, 2017.

== Reception ==
Critical reception for Tales from the Hood has been mixed. Film review aggregator Rotten Tomatoes reported an approval rating of 60%, based on 25 reviews, with a rating average of 5.3/10.

== Sequels ==
A sequel entitled Tales from the Hood 2 premiered at the Fantasia International Film Festival in July 2018, also written by Rusty Cundieff and Darin Scott, who shared directorial duties for the film. Keith David replaced Clarence Williams III as Mr. Simms due to Williams's retirement from acting. It was released on home video on October 2, 2018. Another sequel, Tales from the Hood 3, was released on October 6, 2020.

Tales from the Hood 3 stars Tony Todd and was filmed in Winnipeg. It features four stories, including the wraparound story. "The stories, you know, they're not as big as the first Tales," Cundieff told the podcast Pod of Madness. "But I do think that the stories are stronger, overall, than the second one, and the look of the film is better, a lot to do with the locations that we found."

== See also ==
- List of hood films
