= Cookers =

2001 film by Dan Mintz

- Directed by: Dan Mintz
- Written by: Jack Moore; Jeff Ritchie
- Starring: Brad Hunt; Cyia Batten; Patrick McGaw; Frankie Ray
- Cinematography: Dan Mintz
- Edited by: Jim May; Dan Mintz
- Music by: Billy White Acre; Ennio Di Berardo
- Release dates: April 23, 2001 (Los Angeles Film Festival); February 25, 2005 (U.S.)
- Running time: 96 minutes
- Country: United States
- Language: English

Cookers is an American horror film directed by Dan Mintz which was released in 2001. The film is about two drug users who hide out in an abandoned farmhouse to prepare a huge batch of crystal meth, only to be tormented by terrifying visions.

== Synopsis ==
After stealing the precursor chemicals needed to illicitly produce crystal meth from bikers, a young couple decides to set up a temporary drug lab and make a large batch of the drug, in hopes of making a large profit. The man is a meth addict with extensive experience taking the drug; his girlfriend is an expert in illegal drug preparation. On the advice of friends, they set up their production in an old abandoned house in the middle of a forest. However, they cannot prepare the drug without trying some of it. The couple is already stressed about the risk of being found by the bikers they stole the raw drug materials from, so taking meth only increases their anxiety.

The two drug-makers, nicknamed "cookers" in drug subculture slang, end up getting increasingly paranoid in the dark, isolated house. When a friend (who visits to bring supplies) tells them an urban legend about a horrible murder of a little girl in the old house, the couple gets increasingly afraid. While taking meth, the couple think that they might be seeing glimpses of the dead girl; or it might just be paranoia and drug-fuelled hallucinations. Is there really a ghostly presence in the house, or are the pair just tripping on their newly-cooked drugs?

== Production ==
Cookers was shot in Oxnard, California and was director Dan Mintz's first film. Mintz worked with Jack Moore and Jeff Ritchie again in 2004 on American Crime.

== Awards ==
- Prizes for best film, best photography, best editing and best music at the Festival international du film de Milan 2001.
