= Donald Fullilove =

American actor (born 1958)

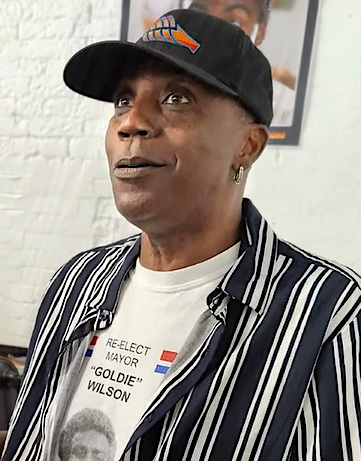
- Fullilove at London Film and Comic Con 2022
- Born: May 16, 1958 (age 68); Dallas, Texas, U.S.
- Other name: Don Fullilove
- Occupation: Actor
- Years active: 1971–present

Donald Fullilove (born May 16, 1958) is an American actor focusing mainly on voice roles. His credits include Back to the Future (1985), Back to the Future Part II (1989), White Men Can't Jump (1992), Mulan (1998), Monsters, Inc. (2001), Spirit: Stallion of the Cimarron (2002), WALL-E (2008), The Hustle (2008), American Dad! (2009), Up (2009), Kung Fu Panda: Secrets of the Masters (2011), Partysaurus Rex (2012), and Monsters University (2013).

== Early life ==
Fullilove was born on May 16, 1958, in Dallas, Texas. He graduated in 1976 from Crenshaw High School in Los Angeles.

== Career ==
Fullilove began his career as a child actor, his first role aged 13, providing the voice of Michael Jackson in the animated ABC-TV Saturday Morning series Jackson 5ive (1971–73). Fullilove voiced Randy in Kid Power, based on the comic strip Wee Pals by Morrie Turner. The following year, he gave voice to Jason Phillips on Emergency +4, an animated adaptation of Emergency!.

In 1980, Fullilove appeared as Smash in Scared Straight! Another Story. He portrayed Hill Valley, California Mayor Goldie Wilson in the first Back to the Future movie in 1985, and his hovermobile salesman grandson Goldie Wilson III in Back to the Future Part II (1989). He made a cameo appearance as the elder Wilson's father in an October 2024 performance of Back to the Future: The Musical on Broadway.

Fullilove portrayed a train foreman in Spirit: Stallion of the Cimarron (2002). He voiced Nurse George, a character in Pixar's Up (2009). He appeared in Partysaurus Rex as Chuck E. Duck, a Toy Story short film. From 2009, Fullilove had a recurring role as Reginald the Koala in American Dad!.

== Personal life ==
Fullilove was married to Tuluv Price-Fullilove, but filed for divorce in 2023. He is an aircraft pilot.

== Filmography ==
Film
Year	Film	Role	Other notes
1980	Scared Straight! Another Story	Smash	Television movie
1981	Homeroom	Billy Coe	Television movie
1985	Tuff Turf	Howard	
1985	Back to the Future	Goldie Wilson	
1985	Basic Training	Typewriter Man	
1988	Cadillac Dreams	Snake	Short film
1989	Back to the Future Part II	Goldie Wilson III	Billed as Don Fullilove
1990	Penny Ante: The Motion Picture	RJ Wallis	Billed as Don Fullilove
1992	White Men Can't Jump	Jake	Billed as Don Fullilove
1998	Mulan	Hun Army	Billed as Don Fullilove
2001	Osmosis Jones	Doughnut	Billed as Don Fullilove
2001	Monsters, Inc.	CDA agent (voice)	Billed as Don Fullilove
2002	Spirit: Stallion of the Cimarron	Train Pull Foreman (voice)	
2006	Domestic Import	Jamaican Shop Keeper	
2006	Curious George	Animal Control Man (voice)	
2007	Transformers: The Game	Walla	Video game; billed as Don Fullilove
2008	WALL-E	Axiom Passenger #7 (voice)	
2008	Tres caminos	Thomas	segment "Los Angeles"
2008	The Hustle	Hose Man	
2009	Up	Nurse George	Voice
2010	A Turtle's Tale: Sammy's Adventures	Green Turtle	Voice
2010	Camp Rock 2: The Final Jam	John White	
2011	Kung Fu Panda: Secrets of the Masters	Gorilla Guard #1	Voice
2012	Partysaurus Rex	Chuck E. Duck (calmer voice)	Voice
2013	Monsters University	Phil (voice)	
2018	Fastest Delorean in the World	Himself	Docu-Drama
Television
Year	Series	Role	Other notes
1971	Jackson 5ive	Michael Jackson (voice)	
1972	Kid Power	Diz/Randy (voice)	
1973–1974	Emergency +4	Jason Phillips	Main role; 23 episodes
1984	High Street Blues	Blood/Junkie	"The End of Logan's Run" (Season 4, Episode 17) (as Junkie) "Lucky Ducks" (Season 4, Episode 21) (as Blood)
1985	The Fall Guy	Guard	"Dead Ringer" (Season 5, Episode 1)
1986	What's Happening Now!!	Junior	"Goodbye, Mr. Ripps" (Season 1, Episode 17)
1990	Mancuso, FBI	John Gubbins	"Death and Taxes" (Season 1, Episode 16)
1990	Major Dad	2nd Lt. Ned Nicholas	"Wetting Down" (Season 2, Episode 16)
1993	Johnny Bago	Redwood	"Spotting Elvis" (Season 1, Episode 6)
1996	Martin	Street Neighbor	"Kicked to the Curb" (Season 4, Episode 17)
2003	What's New, Scooby-Doo?	Passenger #3 (voice)	"The San Franpsycho" (Season 2, Episode 8)
2006	All of Us		"Robert and Neesee Get Real" (Season 3, Episode 14)
2009	American Dad!	Reginald/Tortoise/Cop (voices)	"Family Affair" (Season 4, Episode 10) (as Reginald) "Wife Insurance" (Season 4, Episode 15) (as Reginald) "Delorean Story-An" (Season 4, Episode 16) (as Tortoise) "Stan's Night Out" (Season 4, Episode 20) (as Cop)
2021	Expedition : Back to the Future	Goldie Wilson	Serie
