= Brooklyn South =

Television series

- Genre: Police drama
- Created by: Steven Bochco; Bill Clark; William M. Finkelstein; David Milch
- Starring: Jon Tenney; Michael DeLuise; Gary Basaraba; James B. Sikking; Yancy Butler; Titus Welliver; Klea Scott; Patrick McGaw; Richard T. Jones; Adam Rodriguez; Dylan Walsh
- Composer: Mike Post
- Country of origin: United States
- Original language: English
- No. of seasons: 1
- No. of episodes: 22

Production
- Executive producers: Steven Bochco; Michael S. Chernuchin; William Finkelstein; David Milch; Michael Watkins
- Producer: Mark Tinker
- Production locations: Brooklyn, New York City (exteriors only); Los Angeles, California (interiors)
- Running time: 60 minutes (including commercials)
- Production companies: Steven Bochco Productions; CBS Productions

Original release
- Network: CBS
- Release: September 22, 1997 – April 27, 1998

Brooklyn South is an American ensemble police drama television series that aired on CBS for one season from September 22, 1997, to April 27, 1998. It was aired during the 1997–98 television season. The series was co-created by Steven Bochco, Bill Clark, David Milch, and William M. Finkelstein.

The series attempted to create a setting of a gritty, realistic police station similar to NYPD Blue, but focusing on the uniformed police officers rather than the detectives. The pilot was rated TV-MA for violence, and received attention and controversy as the first broadcast television episode to receive the classification, airing the same year the rating system was introduced.

== Synopsis ==
The focus for Brooklyn South was the 74th Precinct in Brooklyn. Francis "Frank" Donovan (Jon Tenney) was the patrol sergeant who presided every day over the morning shift assignments he gave to the uniformed officers. Donovan was an informant for the hated Internal Affairs Bureau (IAB), and secretly reported to Lt. Stan Jonas (James B. Sikking), who, early in the series, transferred from being an IAB officer to the precinct captain after the officious Captain Lou Zerola (Bradford English) transferred to precinct maintenance. It was later revealed in the season that Donovan became an undercover informant 15 years earlier for IAB to protect his father, a retired cop living in Florida, from indictment for corruption.

In the pilot episode, a psychotic gunman named Hopkins went on a shooting rampage outside the police station, killing a number of policemen and innocent bystanders. He was wounded in the shootout and disarmed and handcuffed by Officer Doyle, who later stopped the other cops from beating Hopkins to death and left his barely breathing self in the interview room alone. It was later revealed that Ann-Marie Kersey (Yancy Butler), a policewoman whose boyfriend was one of the victims of the shooting spree, slipped into the room where Hopkins was and kicked him several times in the chest, leading to Hopkins suffering a fatal heart attack. The killer's family pressured the city to launch an Internal Affairs investigation as they were convinced that he was murdered by cops in retaliation for his killing rampage. Eventually, everyone was exonerated for the suspect's death and Kersey completely got away with it, though her guilt over murdering a critically wounded criminal would haunt her off-and-on for the duration of the series. She wanted to confess at one point to protect a cop who was wrongly indicted for Hopkins' death but was persuaded to wait, and when that cop was rightly cleared by a grand jury she lost any interest in giving herself up. Kersey then had a romantic affair with Donovan, but it did not last. Kersey and Donovan later got back together. Later in the series, Kersey was promoted to detective.

Also in the pilot episode, Phil Roussakoff (Michael DeLuise), a burly officer, transferred to the 74th Precinct and was partnered with Jimmy Doyle (Dylan Walsh), a well liked and respected street cop whose younger brother, Terry (Patrick McGaw), was trying to become a police officer to follow in their late father's footsteps. Terry left the police academy to take an undercover assignment to infiltrate an Irish street gang planning a bank robbery. Roussakoff briefly dated Jimmy and Terry's younger sister, Kathleen (A. J. Langer), but was awkward and uncomfortable to dating. Terry helped foil the Irish gang's robbery, and he ended up joining the police vice squad anti-crime unit.

Jack Lowery (Titus Welliver) was a tough street cop coping with personal demons which included his selfish and nagging wife, Yvonne, who died early in the season. Lowery later started an affair with his female partner, Nona Valentine (Klea Scott), which did not sit well with Clement Johnson (Richard T. Jones), Nona's former boyfriend and the station's traffic cop. Eventually Nona and Clem got back together, then broke up, and by the series end, Nona got back together again with Lowery. Hector Villaneuva (Adam Rodriguez) was a young rookie cop who was tutored by the rest of the officers how to do his job the best be could.

Richard Santoro (Gary Basaraba) was the station's desk sergeant, a police veteran who had seen it all and was the voice of reason in the station house, keeping things calm. Santoro later stuck up for Donovan when he came out as an informant for Internal Affairs Bureau to save Santoro from a corrupt IAB officer who was trying to ruin Santoro's reputation. Ray MacElwaine (John Finn) was a 50-year-old veteran police officer who transferred to the 74th Precinct late in the series and soon proved himself to everyone that despite his age, he could still "walk the beat" and take down criminals. MacElwaine also stuck up for Donovan after finding out Donovan's work with IAB. In the series final episode, MacElwaine decided to retire from the police force, and Santoro was promoted to Lieutenant. So, Captain Jonas threw a double-party for the entire police station in celebrating Santoro's promotion and MacElwaine's retirement. In his speech, MacElwaine changes his mind and decides not to retire, to great celebration.

Other secondary characters included Kevin Patrick (Mark Kiely), a police officer wounded in the opening shooting spree in the pilot episode, which made him a paraplegic, and his wife Noreen (Star Jasper), both of whom were friends with Jimmy, Terry, and the Doyle family. Also, Emily Flannagan (Brigid Brannagh) was a local barmaid and the daughter of Irish mobster Paddy Flannagan who was the leader of the small Irish gang that Terry had infiltrated. After Terry's undercover work was done, he and Emily got romantically together, but the series ended before their romance could go any further.

== Cancellation ==
The series was scheduled opposite ABC's Monday Night Football and NBC's Dateline Monday, and struggled in the ratings, averaging 10.5 million viewers and ranking 74th for the season. The series underwent retooling in an attempt to boost ratings, but despite the changes, the series was canceled in May 1998 shortly after the first season wrapped. In his autobiography, Steven Bochco says personal issues kept him from inputting as much as usual into this show's production, and that this contributed to weak scripts after the first few episodes. He then took more control in the later episodes and ratings began to stabilize, but CBS chairman Les Moonves cancelled the show anyway, a decision Bochco adamantly disagreed with, and a season after extreme tinkering by CBS canceled his comedy Public Morals after one episode.

== Cast ==
=== Main ===
- Jon Tenney as Patrol Sgt. Francis 'Frank' Xavier Donovan
- Michael DeLuise as Officer Phil Roussakoff
- Dylan Walsh as Officer Jimmy Doyle
- James B. Sikking as Lt./Capt. Stan Jonas
- Yancy Butler as Officer/Detective Anne-Marie Kersey
- Gary Basaraba as Sgt./Lt. Richard 'Dicky' Santoro
- Titus Welliver as Officer Jack Lowery
- Klea Scott as Officer Nona Valentine
- Richard T. Jones as Officer Clement 'Clem' Johnson
- Adam Rodriguez as Officer Hector Villaneuva
- Patrick McGaw as Terry Doyle

=== Recurring ===
- A. J. Langer as Kathleen Doyle
- Mark Kiely as Officer Kevin Patrick
- Star Jasper as Noreen Patrick
- Brigid Brannagh as Emmeline 'Emily' Flannagan
- Bradford English as Capt. Lou Zerola (1997)
- John Finn as Officer Ray MacElwaine (1998)

== Crew ==
The series was created by Steven Bochco, Bill Clark, William M. Finkelstein and David Milch. Bochco and Milch had worked together on the previous police drama series Hill Street Blues and NYPD Blue. Bochco and Finkelstein worked together on both L.A. Law and Cop Rock. Clark served as a supervising producer, writer and technical advisor on NYPD Blue and is a retired police officer. Bochco, Clark and Milch served as executive producers for the series alongside writer Michael S. Chernuchin and director Michael Watkins. Chernuchin had previously worked as a producer and writer on Law & Order. Watkins had worked with Bochco as a director for NYPD Blue. Clark worked as a supervising producer and regular writer for Brooklyn South. Marc Buckland was the series other supervising producer and a regular director.

Retired Chicago police officer Edward Allen Bernero was a regular writer for the series. Scott Williams and Matt Olmstead were the series other regular writers. During the 1997–1998 television season, Bochco premiered another new series titled Total Security, which was canceled prior to the mid-season break. Writers Doug Palau and Nicholas Wootton moved from Total Security to Brooklyn South in January 1998 and were regular writers for the seasons second half.

== Episodes ==
No.	Title	Directed by	Written by	Original release date	Prod. code	U.S. viewers (millions)
1	"Pilot"	Mark Tinker	S : Steven Bochco, Bill Clark; S/T : William M. Finkelstein, David Milch	September 22, 1997	C101	16.67
At the 74th Precinct in South Brooklyn, a typical day begins with a sudden bloodbath when a deranged gunman named Dawshawn Hopkins opens fire on policemen and random civilians outside the station. After killing and wounding several people, he is wounded in the gunfight and is taken into custody where he dies from his wounds. Dawshaun's sister Mavis accuses the white officers of murdering her brother because he was black and teams up with a local civil rights activist and preacher, Basil Matheson, to insist that an investigation be launched. Patrol Sergeant Francis Donovan (Jon Tenney) tries to keep the situation together while consulting Officer Ann-Marie Kersey (Yancy Butler), whose detective fiance was one of the victims. Unknown to everyone, Donovan is revealed to be an informant for the hated Internal Affairs Bureau over some past issues involving his father. Phil Roussakoff (Michael DeLuise) is a new transfer and he is partnered with Jimmy Doyle (Dylan Walsh) to find a sniper who intervened during the shootout. At the same time, Doyle, who lives with his younger sister Kathleen (A.J. Langer) and brother Terry (Patrick McGaw), is overjoyed with Terry's announcement that he is joining the police academy to follow in his brother's and their late father's footsteps. Kevin Patrick (Mark Kiely), another officer who was shot in the back during the opening shootout, is comforted by Jimmy Doyle at the hospital when it appears that he might end up paralyzed below the waist. Elsewhere, Officer Jake Lowery (Titus Welliver) deals with his difficult job and his troubled home life involving his contemptuous, highly strung-out wife Yvonne (guest star Jana Marie Hupp). Officer Nona Valentine (Klea Scott) is also affected by events as well as her former boyfriend, traffic cop Clement Johnson (Richard T. Jones), while rookie newcomer Hector Villaneuva (Adam Rodriguez) is assisted by Donovan during his first week on the job. Note – This episode won the 1998 Primetime Emmy Award for Outstanding Directing - Drama Series for director Mark Tinker.
2	"Life Under Castro"	Michael Watkins	S : Bill Clark, David Milch; T : William M. Finkelstein, Michael S. Chernuchin	September 29, 1997	C102	13.60
The repercussions of Hopkins' death in the station continue as Internal Affairs investigates when a dubious witness comes forward who claims that he saw the wounded Hopkins being beaten while in police custody. While both Donovan (Jon Tenney) and Santoro (Gary Basaraba) deal with the wary Captain Lou Sorella (Bradford English), who does not want bad publicity because of the incident, Hopkins' sister Mavis returns with her own lawyer, Wendell Ford (guest star John Cothran), to find out who "murdered" her brother. Lt. Stan Jonas (James B. Sikking) from the hated Internal Affairs Bureau (IAB) arrives again at the 74th Precinct to interview all the participants of the gun battle where Nona (Klea Scott) thinks she incriminated her partner, Lowery (Titus Welliver), over a slip she made about witnessing him slapping Hopkins. Lowery continues dealing with his greedy and selfish wife, Yvonne (guest star Jana Marie Hupp), who tries to persuade him to give her more spending money. Donovan is wary about Jonas presence because Jonas happens to be Donovan's secret contact and handler for IAB. Meanwhile, Doyle (Dylan Walsh) and Roussakoff (Michael DeLuise) try to help out a young boy who is working on the streets as a drug runner. Also, Kersey (Yancy Butler) and Donovan investigate the death of an elderly woman who was smothered in her sofa bed and her husband is the most likely suspect.
3	"Why Can't Even a Couple of Us Get Along?"	Matthew Penn	S : Stephen Bocho, David Milch; T : Edward Allen Bernero	October 6, 1997	C103	TBA
When a Hasidic Jew (guest star Theodore Bikel) and his granddaughter are mugged, a militant Hasidic rabbi, named Aaron Geller (guest star Joel Brooks), organizes a vigilante group to find and punish the assailant, believing the police cannot be counted on to find the culprit. But when the granddaughter points out the wrong suspect, and he turns out to be innocent, Santoro (Gary Basaraba), Donovan (Jon Tenney), and the rest of the squad deal with the backlash from the Hasidic community. Doyle (Dylan Walsh) and Roussakoff (Michael DeLuise) investigate a family dispute between the O'Donnells and the Westbrooks over property rights. Meanwhile, Lt. Jonas (James B. Sikking) interrogates Lowery (Titus Welliver) over the death of Hopkins in custody where Jonas orders Donovan to go along with him to obtain incriminating evidence against Lowery. Also, Santoro deals with his personal home life when his nine-year-old son, Charlie, gets into trouble at his elementary school for mouthing off to his stern teacher. Roussakoff asks Doyle for advice when he plans to go on a date with Kathleen (A.J. Langer), while Kersey (Yancy Butler) goes on a date with Donovan. Here, the county coroner, Dr. Vanderluke (guest star Michael Fairman), confides in Kersey about a find he never entered into evidence involving Hopkins death.
4	"Touched by a Checkered Cab"	Marc Buckland	Michael S. Chernuchin	October 13, 1997	C104	TBA
Lowery (Titus Welliver) has to go to a grand jury over his alleged participation in Hopkins' death and has to wait to see whether he still has a career or not, while his wife, Yvonne (guest star Jana Marie Hupp), plots to leave him afterward, but she has a fatal encounter with a runaway taxi. Having confided in Donovan (Jon Tenney) that she was the one who murdered Hopkins by kicking him to death as he lay fatally wounded on the roll-call room floor, Kersey (Yancy Butler) wants to confess to the incident. But Donovan refuses to let her come forward on speculation for he's confident that Lowery will be cleared of all the charges. Meanwhile, Doyle (Dylan Walsh) and Roussakoff (Michael DeLuise) are once again called to the home of the O'Donnells when their father is found murdered. The eldest son, Kevin (Mark Kiely), thinks he was killed by one of the Westbrook boys, their next-door neighbors and constant adversaries. Also, Donovan deals with his very first partner, the elderly officer Gus Steiger (guest star William G. Schilling), who finds his mental faculties slowly leaving him during his court testimony on a separate murder investigation.
5	"Clown Without Pity"	Michael Watkins	S:Bill Clark, David Milch T:Scott A. Williams	October 20, 1997	C105	TBA
Santoro (Gary Basaraba) deals with an eccentric woman coming into the station to report that she is being harassed by a group of clowns living next door to her who have been participating in illegal sex acts. Soon, the whole precinct becomes a freak show as Hector (Adam Rodriguez) and Clem (Richard T. Jones) haul the clowns into the holding cells to decide what to do with them. Meanwhile, Lowery (Titus Welliver) and Nona (Klea Scott) help out a disabled man who was beaten up and robbed in his own apartment, and to help him recover his precious stamp collection. Lowery continues to deal with life without Yvonne (guest star Jana Marie Hupp) as well as dealing with his acquittal by the grand jury over the Hopkins incident, while Donovan (Jon Tenney) and Kersey (Yancy Butler) continue to spend more time together on and off the job, and Roussakoff (Michael DeLuise) asks Doyle (Dylan Walsh)'s permission to take Kathleen (A.J. Langer) out to dinner.
6	"A Reverend Runs Through It"	Paris Barclay	S : Bill Clark, Steven Bochco; T : Edward Allen Bernero, Michael S. Chernuchin	November 3, 1997	C106	TBA
While visiting an apartment on official business, Clem (Richard T. Jones), Lowery (Titus Welliver), Doyle (Dylan Walsh), and Hector (Adam Rodriguez) hear shots coming from the floor above and chase two Hispanic perpetrators to the roof. One is killed, but the other gets away. They killed a black family because drugs were being dealt from their apartment. The view of the officers is that it was more than a random occurrence and that a recently paroled drug lord, Jerome McFee, was involved in some way. But the local Reverend Basil Matheson returns with the lawyer, Wendell Ford (guest star John Cothran), where they put more pressure on Clem to find the killer, and then make the investigation their business to stir up more tensions between the African American community and the police. Meanwhile, Santoro (Gary Basaraba)'s brother-in-law is arrested for possession of stolen goods kept in a locker that has Santoro's name on the lease, which could cause problems for Santoro when Lt. Jonas (James B. Sikking) from Internal Affairs pays another visit to the station. Also, Roussakoff (Michael DeLuise) and Doyle investigate an abusive husband and decide to teach him a lesson about the results of domestic abuse. Elsewhere, Santoro and Donovan commence their plans to remove Captain Sorela as their boss by playing on his paranoia to make him think that he's under investigation which leads to the officious captain quitting as the station's chief.
7	"Love Hurts"	Marc Buckland	S : Bill Clark, David Milch, Steven Bochco; T : William M. Finkelstein, Scott Williams	November 10, 1997	C107	TBA
Roussakoff (Michael DeLuise) and Hector (Adam Rodriguez) arrest two gay men for brawling in the street outside a gay bar. Two of the precinct's beat cops, Heagan and Pittorino, are assigned to escort them to the station. But by the time they reach the station house, the gay men's injuries are much worse and one of them accuses the two officers who brought them in of police brutality. Roussakoff and Hector find themselves as witnesses to the event as Santoro tries to find out which party is telling the truth. Meanwhile, Terry Doyle (Patrick McGaw) finds himself doing some driving, to earn some extra money, for a businessman. He informs his brother Jimmy (Dylan Walsh), and then Lt. Jonas (James B. Sikking) of Internal Affairs, when he discovers that the man, Paddy Flannagan (guest star Bill Bolender), is a major criminal. Terry is asked to go undercover, even though he hasn't even finished at the academy yet. Elsewhere, Lowery (Titus Welliver) and Nona (Klea Scott) investigate a shop owner who claims that is he being harassed by an Arab hot dog vendor who is stealing business from his store. Also, Jonas surprises everyone when he arrives at the station and announces that he's the new captain of the 74th Precinct.
8	"Wild Irish Woes"	Jean de Segonzac	S : Steven Bochco, William M. Finkelstein, Bill Clark, David Milch; T : Michael S. Chernuchin	November 17, 1997	C108	TBA
Terry Doyle (Patrick McGaw) begins his undercover assignment to infiltrate Paddy Flannagan's (guest star Bill Bolender) Irish street gang and enjoys his new work in getting close to the gang's leader, Bobby Quinn, and his girlfriend and co-conspirator, Emily (Brigid Brannagh), who is Flannagan's daughter. Santoro (Gary Basaraba) comes to the aid of Kevin Patrick (Mark Kiely) (one of the officers shot during the Dashawn Hopkins shooting spree in the pilot episode) who is having trouble coming to terms with his disabling injury. After Patrick's wife, Noreen (Star Jasper), expresses concern about his mental health, Santoro offers Patrick a desk job at the station. Captain Jonas (James B. Sikking) sets up shop as he officially takes over as precinct commander and agrees to make it handicapped accessible for Patrick. Meanwhile, a badly wounded woman leads Nona (Klea Scott), Doyle (Dylan Walsh), Lowery (Titus Welliver), and the other cops to a house with six dead bodies, all tied up with their throats cut. The investigation starts to find those who committed this crime. Nona and Lowery try to find leads from a junkie named Honeydew, while Doyle and Roussakoff see that the lead detective, Conroy, may have a drug problem himself, and Donovan (Jon Tenney) ends up saving Kersey (Yancy Butler)'s life during the police bust of the suspects.
9	"McMurder One"	Elodie Keene	David Milch, William M. Finkelstein	November 24, 1997	C109	8.90
Kersey (Yancy Butler) begins having nightmares stemming from her guilt over killing Hopkins and getting away with it, which puts a strain on Donovan (Jon Tenney) which leads to them deciding to take a break with their relationship. When the ex-wife of William 'Woody' McKenzie (guest star Richard McGonagle) (the prosecutor who helped clear Lowery (Titus Welliver) from the Hopkins murder charges) is found dead in her Manhattan apartment, Woody becomes the main suspect. Looking for help, he calls Donovan to help him. Although Donovan wants to believe in McKenzie's innocence, mounting circumstantial evidence in the investigation led by Detective Stuart Morrissey (guest star Conor O'Farrell; a recurring guest star from the series NYPD Blue) points that Woody may have hired a hit man to do the deed for him. Meanwhile, Terry (Patrick McGaw) gets deeper into his undercover role with the illegal actives with the Irish mob when he learns that Patty Flannigan (guest star Bill Bolender) along with Bobby, and Joe (guest star Christopher Meloni) are setting up a deal with some street rappers to buy automatic weapons for a bank robbery. But Terry's problems multiply when he soon clashes with the leader, Joe, who holds a grudge against Terry's brother, Jimmy (Dylan Walsh), who arrested him years before. Jimmy, worried about Terry, asks a street informant, named Darius, to keep an eye on Terry. Also, Santoro leads Lowery, Roussakoff (Michael DeLuise), and the rest of the station to renovate itself to make it handicap accessible in preparation for Kevin Patrick (Mark Kiely)'s return to work in his wheelchair.
10	"Dublin or Nothin"	Michael Watkins	S : Bill Clark, Steven Bochco; T : William M. Finkelstein; S/T : David Milch	December 8, 1997	C110	8.40
Terry (Patrick McGaw)'s undercover work is beginning to worry Jimmy (Dylan Walsh), as Joe's grudge against Terry intensifies. When Paddy (guest star Bill Bolender) falls ill from a terminal heart condition, Joe insists that the robbery be carried out soon as possible, while Emily also begins to worry about Terry's well-being. The gang's bank robbery finally goes down where Terry does his own investigation to try to stop Joe and Bobby. But Joe begins to suspect that Terry cannot be trusted in which he feeds Terry false information about the hold-up that puts everyone's lives at risk, while he plans to kill Terry afterward as his twisted final revenge against Jimmy Doyle. Meanwhile, Kevin Patrick (Mark Kiely) comes back to work, trying to adjust to the fact that he is going to spend the rest of his life in a wheelchair at a desk while the rest of his colleagues hit the streets. Also, Clem (Richard T. Jones) offers to spend some time with Nora (Klea Scott) to rekindle their romance.
11	"Gay Avec"	Lesli Linka Glatter	John Chambers	January 12, 1998	C112	TBA
Officer Heagan's disciplinary hearing over the gay beating takes place and Roussakoff (Michael DeLuise) has to testify against him. But when Officer Pittorino changes his testimony, it looks like Heagan could go free. Meanwhile, Officer Anthony Fiano (guest star Jack Blessing) shoots and kills an armed robber while in a gay bar. When he comes in, he is questioned by Detective Hayes and I.A.B. Lieutenant Gordon Denton (Donovan (Jon Tenney)'s new contact and handler) who seems determined to take Fiano down, or at least get him to admit that he is gay. Santoro (Gary Basaraba) investigates the robbery and learns the identity of Fiano and tries to get Donovan to help protect Fiano from the investigation. Elsewhere, Jimmy Doyle (Dylan Walsh) is teamed with the rookie Christine Bannon (guest star Erika Eleniak) to nab a narcotics dealer and his suppliers. Also, Lowery (Titus Welliver) becomes smitten with a foreign immigrant, named Elena (guest star Elena Maddalo), who was robbed by a purse snatcher.
12	"Exposing Johnson"	Christopher Misiano	Edward Allen Bernero, Michael S. Chernuchin	January 19, 1998	C111	8.20
Kersey (Yancy Butler) and Lowery (Titus Welliver) investigate an incident when a man exposed himself to a teenage girl near her school. The girl Melissa (guest star Jessica Alba), happens to be the daughter of George Hauer (guest star Don Stark), a court officer and an old friend of Captain Jonas (James B. Sikking). But following the man's arrest, the traumatized teenage girl cannot positively identify the man. Without any evidence the man is freed, much to Hauer's disgust. Not long after this, Jonas is personally called to a crime scene where Hauer is found... with the dead body of the released suspect. Meanwhile, Terry Doyle (Patrick McGaw) starts work in the anti-crime unit, partnering up with the attractive Christine Bannon (guest star Erika Eleniak), while he also starts a possible romance with Emily Flannagan (Brigid Brannagh) off the job. Santoro (Gary Basaraba) fires Kevin Patrick (Mark Kiely) for his rash and suicidal attempt to stop the bank robbery after his heroism ceremony. Also, Nona (Klea Scott) discovers a secret about Clem (Richard T. Jones) and his past while tracking the illegal activities of a Japanese street gang which brings them more romantically together, while Kersey and Donovan (Jon Tenney) continue to be uncomfortable around each other over their now-ended affair.
13	"Tears on My Willow"	James Whitmore, Jr.	S : Steven Bochco, David Milch; T : Doug Palau, Nicholas Wootton	January 26, 1998	C113	TBA
Clem (Richard T. Jones) and Hector (Adam Rodriguez) arrest a prostitute for possession of drugs after pulling her over in her car. Hector recognizes her as Willow Mortner (guest star Danielle Harris), one of the clowns arrested previously (in episode 'Clown Without Pity') and he wants to help her, against Clem's advice. Willow wants to give up the name and address of her drug supplier for her freedom. No one is quite sure whether she is telling is the truth, but agree to look into it. Meanwhile, Jimmy Doyle (Dylan Walsh) is reluctantly partnered with Officer Ray MacElwaine (John Finn), a middle-aged widower and 24-year veteran of the force who transfers from another precinct, to help investigate a number of robberies involving the theft of collection jars for a home for recovering alcoholics. Terry Doyle (Patrick McGaw) continues working with Christine Bannon (guest star Erika Eleniak) to catch the 'Jarman'.
14	"Violet Inviolate"	Marc Buckland	S : William M. Finkelstein, Bill Clark, David Milch; T : Ted Mann	February 2, 1998	C114	TBA
Lowery (Titus Welliver) plans to marry Elena, the Russian woman he met a short time ago, to help her with her immigration problems. Nona (Klea Scott) begins to suspect something more going on and asks Clem (Richard T. Jones) to investigate her. But when Clem begins tailing Elena, he begins to suspect that she is not who she appears to be. Meanwhile, members of an opposing gang raid a hospital to kill an already wounded member of another gang. To stop an all out war between the two gangs, Doyle (Dylan Walsh), MacElwaine, Donovan (Jon Tenney), make arrests and then have Captain Jonas (James B. Sikking) arrange a sit down talk between the two gang heads right at the station. Elsewhere, a greedy and sleazy lawyer sues Roussakoff (Michael DeLuise) and Kersey (Yancy Butler) for, among other things, allowing an overweight, suicidal woman to leap from a building onto his car.
15	"Fisticuffs"	Michael Watkins	S : William M. Finkelstein, Bill Clark, David Milch; T : Edward Allen Bernero, Scott Williams	February 23, 1998	C115	TBA
When Santoro (Gary Basaraba) helps his gambler brother-in-law out of debt with a local bookie, a taped conversation between the bookie and Santoro lands in the hands of the corrupt IAB Lt. Denton (guest star Bryan Cranston) who thinks that Santoro is involved in illegal extortion activities. Donovan (Jon Tenney) investigates Santoro's case and finds out that Santoro is innocent, but Denton wants to nail Santoro anyway to take credit for the bust to advance his career. But Donovan realizes that by exposing Denton setting up Santoro could jeopardize his own relationship with his fellow officers should they find out that he's been an informant for Internal Affairs. Meanwhile, the insanely jealous Clem (Richard T. Jones) and Lowery (Titus Welliver) finally come to physical blows over Nona Valentine (Klea Scott) when Lowery finally admits that he has had romantic feelings for her which leads to a climatic ally fistfight between the two officers.
16	"Don't You Be My Valentine"	Lesli Linka Glatter	S : Bill Clark, William M. Finkelstein, Steven Bochco; T : Matt Olmstead	March 2, 1998	C116	TBA
Donovan (Jon Tenney) is forced to reveal his secret work about working with Internal Affairs for the last 15 years to the rest of the precinct before it becomes common knowledge. His fellow officers have differing reactions to this news. While Santoro (Gary Basaraba) and Kersey (Yancy Butler) are supportive, most of them, including Clem (Richard T. Jones), Nona (Klea Scott), Lowery (Titus Welliver), and Roussakoff (Michael DeLuise), feeling betrayed and angry, plot their next move against Donovan. Donovan refuses to give a reason for his involvement for IAB despite Jonas (James B. Sikking) advice as well as Santoro's questioning on why, while he also tells Kersey to keep her distance to him in light of this revelation. Meanwhile, Doyle (Dylan Walsh) and MacElwaine (John Finn) are called to the scene of a homicide when an apartment building tenant is founded murdered. Their prime suspect becomes the building landlord who was working with the precinct to evict his tenants to turn his building into expensive lawyer apartments. Also, Nona ends her relationship with Clem for his bad temper and his continuing grudge against Lowery.
17	"Dead Man Sleeping"	Marc Buckland	Doug Palau, Nicholas Wootton	March 9, 1998	C117	TBA
Roussakoff (Michael DeLuise) has trouble staying awake during his shift after working nights as a security guard at a mortuary so that he can buy his mother a car, which leads to an amusing twist when he falls asleep inside a coffin, and he later wakes up during a funeral service for a slain policeman with him at the center of attention. Meanwhile, Donovan (Jon Tenney)'s retired policeman father, Gene, returns to town for a visit and to undergo heart surgery, having not even told his son that he had a heart attack. Gene Donovan is disgusted and angry when his son admits that he was an informant for the hated Internal Affairs. However, Gene is ultimately forced to learn why Francis Donovan was forced to agree to work for the so-called "rat squad". Eventually, the sympathetic Officer MacElwaine (John Finn) sticks up for Donovan in front of rest of the officers still ostracizing him. Meanwhile, Nona then goes undercover as a prostitute, eliciting a number of comments about the way she looks from her colleagues. Afterward, Nona (Klea Scott) helps a young prostitute who's in custody when she realizes that the woman, although denying it, has an unsupervised infant at home.
18	"Fools Russian"	Michael Watkins	Allen Edwards, Matt Olmstead, Scott Williams	March 16, 1998	C118	TBA
Lowery (Titus Welliver) takes an interest in the murder of Elena, his former girlfriend, who is found dead in an alley, shot three times. The prime suspect is a Latvian businessman who she had often been seen with in a coffee shop and Clem (Richard T. Jones) reluctantly agrees to help Lowery investigate since he was the one who had seen Elena in the company of the suspect. Meanwhile, Santoro (Gary Basaraba) is asked to help out his trouble-making nephew, Johnny Mancuso (guest star Milo Ventimiglia), with a few speeding tickets and he ends up losing his temper with the highway cops. Also, Doyle (Dylan Walsh) and MacElwaine (John Finn) keep being called to the apartment of a couple who are continuously fighting, where the wife, Gerri (guest star Carrie Hamilton), is clearly being beaten and abused, but refuses to press charges against her husband. When Doyle and MacElwaine return for another complaint, they find the woman with another man... and her husband murdered. Elsewhere, Roussakoff (Michael DeLuise) deals with problems he has with Kathleen (A.J. Langer) and feels awkward at where they stand in their relationship.
19	"Doggonit"	Christopher Misiano	Doug Palau, Nicholas Wootton	April 13, 1998	C119	TBA
Roussakoff (Michael DeLuise) and Doyle (Dylan Walsh) interview a man who comes into the precinct station to tell Santoro (Gary Basaraba) that his gay lover has a gun to his dog's head and is threatening to go on a rampage. Meanwhile, Kersey (Yancy Butler) is asked by Donovan (Jon Tenney) and Captain Jonas (James B. Sikking) to go undercover as a rich widow trying to buy drugs from a local dealer... a supposedly easy job that goes badly wrong when the guy tries to rip her off and Kersey ends up killing him. When Lowery (Titus Welliver) learns that Nona (Klea Scott) has no plans for her birthday, he plans to get the day off to spend it with her. But away from the job, their day culminates into a romantic evening, forcing them to acknowledge their ardent feelings for each other.
20	"Cinnamon Buns"	James Whitmore, Jr.	S : Steven Bochco, William M. Finkelstein, Bill Clark, David Milch; T : Matt Olmstead	April 14, 1998	C120	TBA
Kersey (Yancy Butler) is promoted from patrolwoman to detective and begins work on the second floor of the building in the detectives squad, but she is not accepted by her new co-workers, until she earns their respect by organizing a raid on an apartment where an informant has told her two men, part of a right-wing militant group, are making bombs to blow up a subway station. Meanwhile, the precinct gets a new administrative aide, Dee Williams (guest star Miriam Flynn), someone Roussakoff remembers from his old precinct. But he tells Santoro (Gary Basaraba) that Dee has an obsessive-compulsive disorder that involves cleanliness and having to do everything four times. Also, Lowery (Titus Welliver) and Nora (Klea Scott) finally begin a steamy affair, which does not go unnoticed by Clem (Richard T. Jones) who becomes unbearably bitter and aloof which leads to him taking out his frustrations on an arrested prostitute that he and Hector (Adam Rodriguez) arrest.
21	"Skel in a Cell"	Marc Buckland	S : Steven Bochco, William M. Finkelstein, Bill Clark, David Milch; T : Doug Palau, Nicholas Wootton	April 20, 1998	C121	TBA
After an arrested drug dealer dies in a cell in the station house, the coroner determines that he died from a self-strangulation suicide, which puts Jimmy Doyle (Dylan Walsh) in a jam as he was the arresting officer and was supposed to have kept an eye on his prisoner. Doyle finds himself unwillingly covering for a night shift officer who was looking after the prisoner. Meanwhile, Clem (Richard T. Jones), while off the job, is approached outside a supermarket by a con man, named Steve Richards (guest star Paul Ben-Victor; a recurring guest star from the series NYPD Blue), who has a plan to scam the business owners. A sting is set up to arrest the man, but things do not go according to plan when drug runners with ties to the con artist arrive on the scene, provoking a deadly shooting spree in the middle of the sting operation, in which Clem gets shot. Kersey (Yancy Butler), Terry (Patrick McGaw), and the other detectives team up try to force Steve Richards to set up a big-shot lawyer (guest star George Wyner) who may be after him. Also, MacElwaine (John Finn) confides in Jimmy (Dylan Walsh) that he thinks it may be time for him to retire from the police force.
22	"Queens for a Day"	Michael Watkins	S : Stephen Bocho, Bill Clark; T : William M. Finkelstein, David Milch, Matt Olmstead	April 27, 1998	C122	TBA
Lowery (Titus Welliver) is assigned to watch over a smart-mouthed group of female gang members, called the Latin Queens, when one of them is found murdered in her apartment. Suspects are brought in where Detective Kersey (Yancy Butler) interrogates them and discovers that one of the gang members is a cop who has been working undercover for over two years to bring down the gang. Meanwhile, MacElwaine (John Finn) arrests a bitter ex-cop at a bar who assaults Hector (Adam Rodriguez), and he injures the man's ribs while doing so. They take him to hospital where the suspect escapes and it leads to a hostage situation back at the bar and only MacElwaine can try to defuse it. The precinct prepares for a new era as MacElwaine announces that he is going to retire after 25 years on the force, and Santoro (Gary Basaraba) is promoted to Lieutenant. Although, everyone in the precinct accepts MacEwaine's decision to retire, his ability to defuse the hostage crisis gives him confidence that he may still have a few more good years on the force. Santoro's wife, Vicky, tells him that she may be pregnant again. Captain Jonas (James B. Sikking) throws a double-party for the entire precinct to celebrate Santoro's promotion and MacEwaine's retirement. With Clem (Richard T. Jones) still in the hospital, Nona (Klea Scott) visits him where he tells her that she is free to get back together with Lowery. At the party, Kathleen Doyle (A.J. Langer) and Roussakoff (Michael DeLuise) talk about getting back together, while romantic glances between Donovan (Jon Tenney) and Kersey implies hope that they will get back together as well for the first time in months, and for the first since Kersey was promoted to detective. During his retirement speech, MacElwaine changes his mind and decides not to retire for the time being... to great celebration. The series ends with a police bagpipe orchestra playing 'Amazing Grace' for the party attendees, while Nona leaves the party with Lowery to go someplace so they can romantically spend the night together.

== Home media ==
DVD name	Ep #	Release date	Additional information
Brooklyn South: The Complete Series	22	October 28, 2003	Commentary with Co-Creator David Milch on the Pilot Episode; Interview with Creator Steven Bochco; Cast and Crew biographies; List of police radio response "Ten Codes"
Brooklyn South: The Complete Series	22	January 25, 2017	Manufacture-on-demand release.

== Awards and nominations ==
Year	Award	Category	Recipient	Result	Refs
1998	Art Directors Guild	Excellence in Production Design – Television Series	Paul Eads and Lee Mayman	Won	
1998	Casting Society of America	Best Casting for TV, Dramatic Pilot	Junie Lowry-Johnson	Nominated	
1998	Directors Guild of America Award	Outstanding Directorial Achievement in Dramatic Series' – Night	Mark Tinker (for pilot episode)	Nominated	
1998	Emmy Award	Outstanding Directing for a Drama Series	Mark Tinker (for pilot episode)	Won	
1998	People's Choice Awards	Favorite Television New Dramatic Series	Brooklyn South	Won	
1999	Edgar Award	Best Television Episode	Steven Bochco, Bill Clark, Allen Edwards, William M. Finkelstein, David Milch, Matt Olmstead, and Scott A. Williams (for "Fools Russian")	Nominated	
1999	Edgar Award	Best Television Episode	Steven Bochco, Bill Clark, William M. Finkelstein, David Milch, Doug Palau, and Nicholas Wootton (for "Skel in a Cell")	Nominated	
