= American Crime =

American Crime may refer to:

- American Crime (film), 2004 film
- American Crime (TV series), 2015 ABC TV series

== See also ==
- An American Crime, 2007 film
- American Crime Story, 2016 FX TV series
- Crime in the United States
