= Bradford English =

American character actor (1942–2024)

- Born: James Bradford English; January 16, 1942; South Orange, New Jersey, U.S.
- Died: October 25, 2024 (aged 82); Pasadena, California, U.S.
- Occupation: Actor
- Years active: 1971–2010

James Bradford English Sr. (January 16, 1942 – October 25, 2024) was an American character actor known for his roles in film and television. He was best known in the horror film community for his role in the 1995 horror movie Halloween: The Curse of Michael Myers as John Strode. His first movie role was in the 1971 movie The Anderson Tapes, he also starred in the 1979 movie The Onion Field.

English made guest appearances on many television shows. His appearances ranged from Kojak, Diff'rent Strokes, The A-Team, Hunter, Seinfeld, Alien Nation, NYPD Blue, 21 Jump Street, Brooklyn South, and Crossing Jordan and Mad Men.

English died in Pasadena, California on October 25, 2024 at the age of 82.

== Filmography ==
=== Film ===
| Year | Title | Role | Notes |
|---|---|---|---|
| 1971 | The Anderson Tapes | T.V. Watcher | |
| 1979 | The Onion Field | Red Haired Cop | |
| 1982 | Hanky Panky | Guard #1 | |
| 1982 | Waltz Across Texas | Billy Pepperberg | |
| 1983 | Deal of the Century | Man from McDonnell Douglas | |
| 1986 | The Malibu Bikini Shop | Marshal #1 | |
| 1989 | The Fabulous Baker Boys | Earl | |
| 1992 | Basic Instinct | Campus Policeman | |
| 1994 | Wolf | Keyes | |
| 1995 | Higher Learning | Officer Bradley | |
| 1995 | Halloween: The Curse of Michael Myers | John Strode | |
| 1999 | Thick as Thieves | Kendall | |
| 2001 | Determination of Death | Col. Black | |
| 2005 | Whigmaleerie | Mark the Boss Man | |
| 2006 | Karla | Kaitlyn's Father | |
| 2007 | Lucky You | Tommy the Poker Host | |

=== Television ===
| Year | Title | Role | Notes |
|---|---|---|---|
| 1976–1977 | Kojak | Patrolman Seymour / Cop at the Church / Royce | 3 episodes |
| 1978 | The Eddie Capra Mysteries | Cliff | Episode: "The Two Million Dollar Stowaway" |
| 1979 | Family | Mr. Bremmer | Episode: "The Competition" |
| 1980 | Mother and Daughter: The Loving War | Don | Television film |
| 1980 | Fun and Games | Tex Landers | Television film |
| 1980 | Alcatraz: The Whole Shocking Story | Thompkins | Television film |
| 1981 | Diff'rent Strokes | Mr. Moore | Episode: "Where There's Hope" |
| 1982 | Gavilan | Tim McGann | Episode: "Destination Hero" |
| 1983 | M.A.D.D.: Mothers Against Drunk Drivers | Officer Sternhagen | Television film |
| 1984 | The A-Team | Casey | Episode: "Fire" |
| 1984 | Hill Street Blues | Uniform Cop | Episode: "Fuched Again" |
| 1985 | T. J. Hooker | Deputy D.A. Paul Clay | Episode: "Sanctuary" |
| 1985 | Riptide | Silverman's Henchman | Episode: "Arrivederci, Baby" |
| 1985 | Dallas | Matt | Episode: "Curiosity Killed the Cat" |
| 1986 | Hunter | Singer | Episode: "Blow-Up" |
| 1986 | 21 Jump Street | Officer Charlie Rosemont | Episode: "Chapel of Love" |
| 1988 | Cagney & Lacey | Sgt. Marren | Episode: "Amends" |
| 1989 | Capone Behind Bars | Warden Johnson | Television film |
| 1989 | Alien Nation | John Macy | Episode: "The Night of the Screams" |
| 1990 | Knots Landing | Priest | Episode: "The Grim Reaper" |
| 1990 | Last Flight Out | Jerry | Television film |
| 1990 | Seinfeld | Cop | Episode: "The Robbery" |
| 1991 | Jake and the Fatman | Ron Destry | Episode: "I'm Gonna Live Till I Die" |
| 1991 | Life Goes On | Mr. Simon | Episode: "Thanks a Bunch, Dr. Lamaze" |
| 1991 | The New Adam 12 | Officer Hardy | Episode: "Bad Blood" |
| 1992 | Cheers | Chuck | Episode: "The King of Beers" |
| 1993 | Dying to Love You | Detective #1 | Television film |
| 1993 | Sex, Love and Cold Hard Cash | Warden Harris | Television film |
| 1993 | Grace Under Fire | Fred Atkins | Episode: "Keeping Faith" |
| 1994 | Chicago Hope | Desk Sergeant | Episode: "With the Greatest of Ease" |
| 1995 | Party of Five | Coach | Episode: "Have No Fear" |
| 1996 | Frasier | Frank | Episode: "Where There's Smoke, There's Fired" |
| 1996 | L.A. Firefighters | Porter | Episode: "Till Death Do Us Part" |
| 1996, 2001 | NYPD Blue | Tommy Feely / Stanley Superczynski | 2 episodes |
| 1997 | Murder One | Mr. Sweeney | Episode: "Chapter Ten, Year Two" |
| 1997 | Dark Skies | General Brown | 2 episodes |
| 1997 | The Naked Truth | Trucker | Episode: "The Spa" |
| 1997 | Brooklyn South | Captain Lou Zerola | 6 epidodes |
| 1998 | Pensacola: Wings of Gold | Shelby Hunt | Episode: "We Are Not Alone" |
| 1998 | DiResta | Van Peltz | Episode: "John Kisses Some Ass" |
| 1999 | Popular | Mr. Ford | Episode: "Mo' Menace, Mo' Problems" |
| 2000 | The X-Files | Detective Abbott | Episode: "Patience" |
| 2001 | Boston Public | Mr. Hobson | Episode: "Chapter Sixteen" |
| 2001 | Touched by an Angel | Felix | Episode: "The Perfect Game" |
| 2002 | Ally McBeal | Marshall Polk | Episode: "Woman" |
| 2002 | The Practice | Roland Monroe | Episode: "Bad to Worse" |
| 2003 | Dragnet | Det. Bart McKay | Episode: "Let's Make a Deal" |
| 2003 | Line of Fire | Agent Stu Dillard | Episode: "Mockingbird" |
| 2004 | Crossing Jordan | Frank Givens | Episode: "All the News Fit to Print" |
| 2006 | Murder 101 | Max Arnholdt | Episode: "Murder 101" |
| 2008 | Sweet Nothing in My Ear | Henry Miller | Television film |
| 2008 | Boston Legal | CEO Michael Ryder | Episode: "Guardians and Gatekeepers" |
| 2010 | Mad Men | Jim Crosby | Episode: "Chinese Wall" |
