= The Hustle (TV series) =

American comedy-drama television series

- Created by: Prentice Penny
- Starring: Y'lan Noel; London Brown
- Country of origin: United States
- Original language: English
- No. of seasons: 1

Production
- Production company: Generate

Original release
- Network: Fuse
- Release: June 19 – July 17, 2013

The Hustle is an American comedy drama television series that ran for one season on Fuse. The series premiered on June 19, 2013. The series focuses on the experiences of two aspiring hip hop artists. It was produced by Generate, and created and executive produced by Prentice Penny.

== Synopsis ==
The Hustle follows underground rap duo Kutta and D, also known as “Brooklyn’s Finest,” as they rise through the ranks of the music elite and struggle to keep their friendship intact. Ya-Ya, a childhood friend and A&R representative, advises them and works to get them signed by a major record label. Series regulars include Y'lan Noel and London Brown as rap duo Kutta and D respectively, along with Erica Dickerson as Ya-Ya and Clinton Lowe as Rashad, the duo's sidekick.

== Cast ==
- Y'lan Noel as Kutta. Half of rap duo “Brooklyn’s Finest,” Kutta is the producer, focused and spending every minute he can in the studio. Although he wants the fame, he's also trying to provide the best he can for his son.
- London Brown as D. Half of rap duo, “Brooklyn’s Finest,” D is loyal to his boy Kutta, doing whatever it takes to get signed. Without any commitments tying him down, when he's not in the studio, D is definitely down for getting into the high life of glitz and girls.
- Erica Dickerson as Ya-Ya. Although the boys are putting in the work in the studio, she is the one holding it all together. She manages to find the time to balance her job working as an A&R rep at Flatbush Records and working to help the guys get a record deal and rise to fame. She will do anything it takes to help out her childhood friends and to have a successful career in the industry.
- Clinton Lowe as Rashad. A man of many talents, Rashad, is the sidekick and hype man to the duo, Brooklyn's Finest. When he is not out hustling the group's music, he's keeping the guys in line.
- Davetta Sherwood as Cecile. Mostly known to us as Kutta's baby momma. She is strong, but a very emotional woman, balancing being a single mother and her career as a stylist in the industry. Although Kutta seems to still be concerned with her personal life, she doesn’t let that stop her from her hustle.

== Episodes ==
- "Rule 4080"
- "Anything for a Klondike"
- "Hi, Hater"
- "Worst Comes to Worst My Peoples Come First"
- "Going Back to Cali"
- "Don't Get Mad, UPS Is Hiring"

== Reception ==
The Hustle was favorably reviewed by The Denver Post, the New York Post, the Los Angeles Times and RedEye.
