= DMG Entertainment =

Media and entertainment company

- Industry: Entertainment; Media
- Founded: 1994
- Founder: Dan Mintz; Wu Bing; Peter Xiao
- Headquarters: Beverly Hills, California, United States
- Products: Motion pictures; TV shows; Virtual reality; Books; Comics; Video games
- Owner: Dan Mintz
- Divisions: DMG Film; DMG TV; DMG Interactive; Live Entertainment
- Website: dmg-entertainment.com

DMG Entertainment is an American entertainment and media company, specializing in the co-production and distribution of American films for the Chinese market. The studio's most recognizable films include Looper (2012), Iron Man 3 (2013) and Bloodshot (2020).

== History ==
DMG Entertainment began as a film production company that was founded by Dan Mintz, Wu Bing, and Peter Xiao.

In 2012, DMG started co-producing and financing major motion pictures. Their first picture Looper generated 177 million dollars on a 30 million dollar budget.

After Looper, DMG would go on to produce Iron Man 3 with Marvel Studios, which would later become the most successful of all the Iron Man movies grossing over $1.2 billion in worldwide box office revenue.

== DMG Interactive ==
In 2017, DMG Entertainment launched DMG VR, a new division focused on immersive storytelling. As part of a new project, DMG introduced Arcturus, a DMG subsidiary firm developing interactive VR technologies.

In 2016, DMG also acquired the VR rights to Hasbro's Transformers franchise, a live-action attraction and a theme park for Transformers Universe featuring its most notable characters Optimus Prime and Bumble Bee in an interactive environment using VR technologies. The first "digital theme park" opened in spring 2017 in Shanghai.

== Valiant Entertainment ==
DMG Entertainment was majority shareholder of the books and comics publisher Valiant Comics since 2014, allowing it to have a significant impact on the company's recent development. Following the full acquisition of comic publisher Valiant Entertainment in 2018, DMG added two new divisions: "Books & Comics" and "Video Games".

In 2020, DMG's Valiant Entertainment produced Bloodshot with Columbia Pictures.

== Filmography ==
- Twilight (2008) – theatrical distribution (China)
- The Founding of a Republic (2009) – co-production
- Knowing (2009) – theatrical distribution (China)
- Go Lala Go! (2010) – co-production
- Killers (2010) – theatrical distribution (China)
- Red (2010) – theatrical distribution (China)
- Resident Evil: Afterlife (2011) – theatrical distribution (China)
- The Eagle (2011) – theatrical distribution (China)
- Beginning of the Great Revival (2011) – co-production
- Love You You (2011) – co-production
- Priest (2011) – theatrical distribution (China)
- Repeat I Love You (2012) – co-production
- Looper (2012) – co-production, theatrical distribution (China)
- Iron Man 3 (2013) – co-production
- No Man's Land (2013) – co-production
- Transcendence (2014) – co-production, theatrical distribution (China)
- Point Break (2015) – co-production, theatrical distribution (China)
- Collide (2015) – co-production
- Terminator 2 3D (2016) – theatrical distribution (China)
- Father Figures (2017) – co-production
- Blockers (2018) – co-production
- Playmobil: The Movie (2019) – co-production
- Bloodshot (2020) – co-production
