= Cyia Batten =

American actress (born 1972)

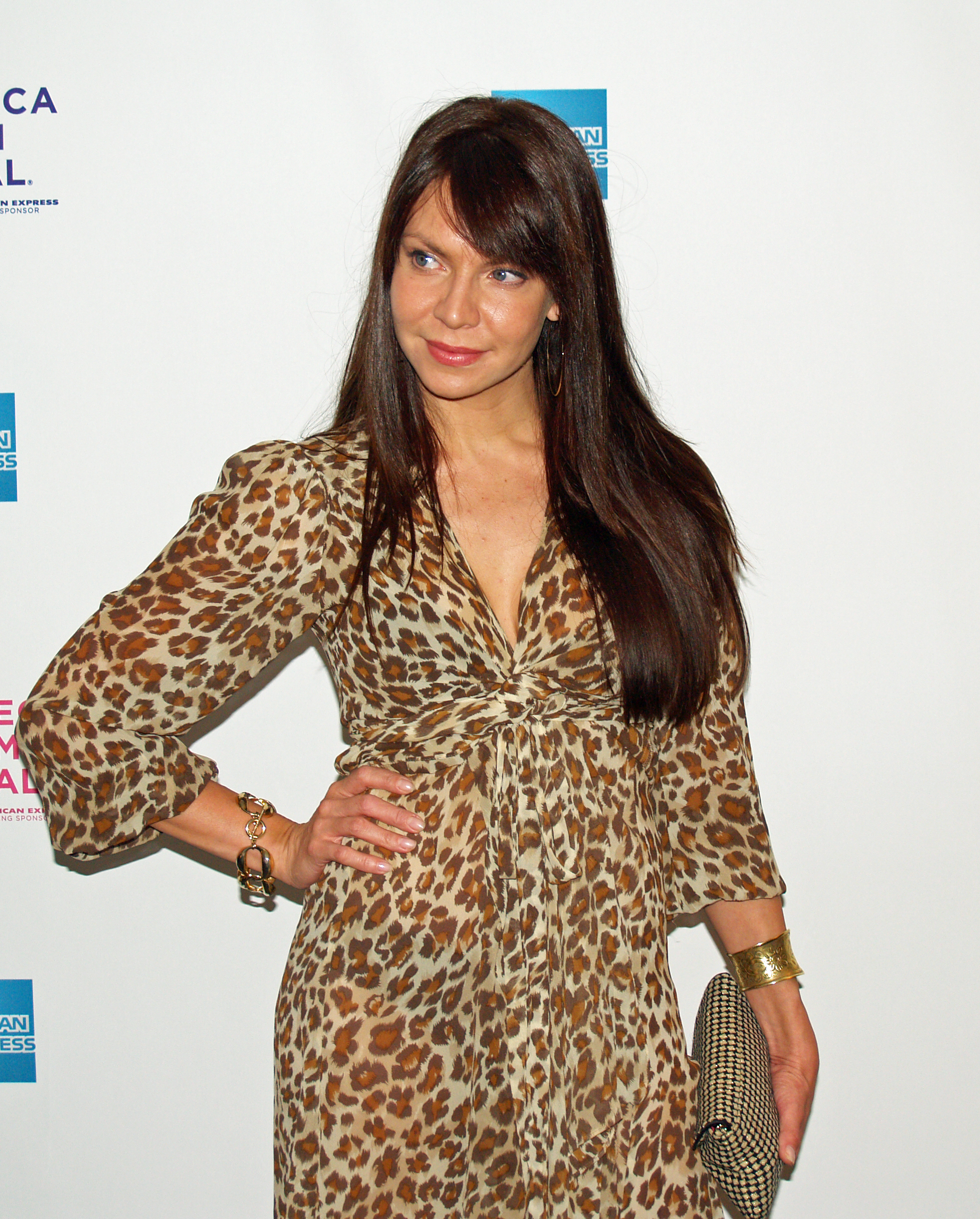
- Batten in 2008
- Born: January 26, 1972 (age 53); Locust Valley, New York, U.S.
- Occupation(s): Interior designer, actress, dancer, model, vedette, showgirl
- Children: 1
- Website: www.cyiabatten.com

Cyia Batten (born January 26, 1972) is an American interior designer and formerly a dancer, model, actress, and Pussycat Dolls dance troupe member.

== Career ==
She has worked as a professional dancer all over the world for various projects including The Pussycat Dolls and Carmen Electra, Teatro Comunale di Firenze and others.

She has had roles in Charlie Wilson's War, The Texas Chainsaw Massacre: The Beginning, Sins of the Mind, Charlie's Angels: Full Throttle, The Sweetest Thing and Killer Movie and on such TV shows as CSI, CSI: NY, CSI: Miami and Crossing Jordan as well as guest appearances on episodes of Star Trek: Deep Space Nine (2 episodes), Star Trek: Voyager, Star Trek: Enterprise, and Studio 60 on the Sunset Strip (2 episodes).

Batten was awarded Best Actress at Screamfest LA 2005 for her role in Cookers in which she played a crystal meth addict. She replaced actress Kelly Carlson in the 2007 horror film Killer Movie.

== Filmography ==
=== Film ===
Year	Title	Role	Notes
1998	Senseless	Punk Waitress	
1999	Black and White	New Woman Cop	
2001	Cookers	Dorena	
2001	Bubble Boy	Dancer	Uncredited
2002	The Sweetest Thing	Go-Go Dancer in Club	Uncredited
2003	Charlie's Angels: Full Throttle	Treasure Chest Dancer	
2004	American Crime	Alice Prescott	
2006	Glass House: The Good Mother	Diane	
2006	The Texas Chainsaw Massacre: The Beginning	Alex	
2007	Charlie Wilson's War	Stacey	
2008	Killer Movie	Lee Tyson	

=== Television ===
Year	Title	Role	Notes
1995	W.E.I.R.D. World	Catherine Lane, Noah's Ex	Television film
1995, 1996	Red Shoe Diaries	Woman #1 / Angel	2 episodes
1995, 1996	Star Trek: Deep Space Nine	Tora Ziyal	2 episodes
1996	Marshal Law	Petal	Television film
1997	Sins of the Mind	Allegra	Television film
1997	Soldier of Fortune, Inc.	Gabrielle	Episode: "Alpha Dogs"
1997	The Pretender	Erica Green	Episode: "Exposed"
1998	Silk Stalkings	Sally Hutchenson	Episode: "The Party"
1999	Profiler	Kate	Episode: "Three Carat Crisis"
1999	Beyond Belief: Fact or Fiction	Vicki Austin	Episode: "E-Mail II"
1999	The Strip	Skylar	Episode: "Send Me an Angel"
1999	Rude Awakening	Alex	Episode: "Bad Will Hunting"
1999	Popular	Marley Jacob	Episode: "Fall on Your Knees"
2000	At Any Cost	Rebecca	Television film
2000	Star Trek: Voyager	Irina	Episode: "Drive"
2000	Nash Bridges	Sherry	Episode: "Grave Robbers"
2001	The Lone Gunmen	Agent Blythe	Episode: "The 'Cap'n Toby' Show"
2002	NYPD Blue	Betty Anne Clancy	Episode: "Hand Job"
2002	Robbery Homicide Division	Maureen Wyler	Episode: "Wild Ride"
2003	The Guardian	Amy Heckt	Episode: "Understand Your Man"
2003	CSI: Crime Scene Investigation	Kelly Goodson	Episode: "A Night at the Movies"
2003	Strong Medicine	Trina	Episode: "Temperatures Rising"
2005	CSI: NY	Ariana Lee	Episode: "Tanglewood"
2005	Star Trek: Enterprise	Navaar	Episode: "Bound"
2006	CSI: Miami	Rebecca Lamar	Episode: "Death Pool 100"
2006, 2007	Studio 60 on the Sunset Strip	Wendy	2 episodes
2007	Eyes	Corrina Markham	Episode: "Investigator"
2007	Crossing Jordan	Debra Scott	Episode: "Hubris"
2007	Suspects	Rachel Fisher	Television film
2008	Swingtown	Daphne	Episode: "Swingus Interruptus"
2009	Nip/Tuck	Girl in Bar	Episode: "Ronnie Chase"
2013	NCIS: Los Angeles	Jenny Radler	Episode: "Drive"
2013	Killer Reality	Delores Robinson	Television film
