= Tales from the Hood 3 =

- Official release poster
- Directed by: Rusty Cundieff; Darin Scott
- Written by: Rusty Cundieff; Darin Scott
- Produced by: Rusty Cundieff; Darin Scott; Griff Furst
- Starring: Tony Todd; London Brown; Cooper Huckabee; Patrick Emmanuel Abellard; Sage Arrindell; Lynn Whitfield; Jaime M. Callica
- Cinematography: Thomas L. Callaway
- Edited by: John Quinn
- Music by: Frederik Wiedmann
- Production companies: Universal 1440 Entertainment; 40 Acres and a Mule Filmworks; Curmudgeon Films
- Distributed by: Universal Pictures Home Entertainment; Syfy
- Release date: October 6, 2020
- Running time: 102 minutes
- Country: United States
- Language: English

Tales from the Hood 3 is a 2020 American black horror anthology film written and directed by Rusty Cundieff and Darin Scott, executive-produced by Spike Lee, and starring Tony Todd, London Brown, Cooper Huckabee, Patrick Emmanuel Abellard, Sage Arrindell, and Lynn Whitfield. The film is the sequel to Cundieff and Scott's 2018 horror anthology Tales from the Hood 2 and tells the story of a lumbering man and a young girl on the run from "bad things" as the young girl tells him different stories to distract him from the impending danger.

The wraparound story is "The Mouths of Babes and Demons" while the segments are "Ruby Gates", "The Bunker", "Operatic" and "Dope Kicks". "The Mouths of Babes and Demons", "The Bunker" and "Dope Kicks" were written and directed by Rusty Cundieff while "Ruby Gates" and "Operatic" were written and directed by Darin Scott.

== Story ==
=== "The Mouths of Babes and Demons" (beginning) ===
A lumbering man named William (Tony Todd) escorts a young child named Brooklyn (Sage Arrindelle) through the woods and into an abandoned building, as they are both on the run from the "bad things", an evil force that is pursuing them. To distract William from the impending danger, Brooklyn tells him stories.

=== "Ruby Gates" ===
Slumlord David Burr (London Brown), owner of the Ruby Gates apartment complex, plans to bulldoze it and replace it with high-rent condos. A wrench is thrown in his plans by Paul and Staci Bradford (Donny Lucas and Rachael McLaren) who refuse to move so as not to aggravate the cancer of their son Ethan (Jahron Wilson). With his boss Joe (John B. Lowe) threatening to sue him for fraud and time running out, Burr hires his disturbed arsonist associate named Mickey (Arne MacPherson) to start a fire to scare the Bradfords out of their apartment. Unfortunately, it goes wrong and results in them burning to death, and their ghosts begin to haunt Burr and the arsonist, seeking revenge on them.

=== "The Bunker" ===
Denton Wilbury (Cooper Huckabee), an absolute bigot, spends his days living like a hermit in an isolated bunker in the middle of nowhere. He runs his own radio show to broadcast various rants of white supremacy, and occasionally comes out to threaten people who seem to congregate outside his bunker, apparently being in a standoff with them. As Denton grows increasingly unstable and unhinged, things build up. When one of the children outside provokes him against the broadcast orders, Denton fires his gun at the child and a forcefield appears deflecting the bullet back at Denton enough to kill him. It is then revealed that Denton's bunker is an exhibit of a high-tech human zoo for different faults of humanity and he was labeled as an endangered species known as the American racist. One kid asks if they have time to visit the misogynist exhibit before the zoo closes.

=== "Operatic" ===
Aspiring pop music singer Chela Simpson (Savannah Basley) works as a backup singer for the pop music singer E-Lips (Natasha Burnett) and wants to break out. After getting reprimanded by E-Lips for trying to upstage and getting thrown out of the recording session, Chela is approached by a man named Parks (Jaime M. Callica). He hires Chela as a caretaker by Marie Benoit (Lynn Whitfield), an elderly and wealthy former opera singer. Marie only had one role in her career: the lead in Carmen. In spite of her talent, her career was destroyed by backlash against a black woman playing the lead. Though the two singers seem to come to a bond, Chela and Park conspire to murder her and steal her fortune. But not everything is as it seems, as Marie may or may not have ulterior motives.

=== "Dope Kicks" ===
Percy Woodhouse (Patrick Abellard) is a criminal nicknamed the Punch & Run Bandit. He is known for brutally assaulting and then robbing his victims, whether they be children, adults, or in the case of his latest target, an elderly grandmother, not knowing that she is a voodoo practitioner. The old woman's granddaughter, in a furious rage, curses the person responsible during a news interview to "walk a mile in their victim's shoes". After beating a man to death and stealing his gold shoes, Percy finds that the shoes won't come off, and he seems to be exhibiting various symptoms related to death, almost as if the curse is making him literally walk in his victim's shoes. This also causes him to be attacked by a bird-like demon (Brianna Ray Ferguson). Percy then confronts the grandmother and his granddaughter at the hospital who inform him how he can break the curse. Percy attempts to apologize to the owner's shoes as it is the only way to break the curse, but the morgue collects the victim's body and begin cutting into it, killing Percy and trapping his soul in his body as the bird-like demon constantly tries to remove his soul to no avail as the gold shoes are keeping his soul anchored to the living world while causing Percy immeasurable pain from the demon's attempts to remove his soul.

=== "The Mouths of Babes and Demons" (ending) ===
It's revealed that William is a child murderer who was about to make Brooklyn his next victim until he was surrounded by the ghosts of his past child victims who dismember him with axes. Brooklyn reveals that she's a form of the devil and is there to claim William's soul and the "Bad Things" were her escorts. The souls of William's victims fly to heaven while Brooklyn claims William's head/soul for herself. At the end of the film, Brooklyn turns to the camera and asks the viewers "Do you want to hear a story?" with flaming eyes and laughs maniacally.

== Cast ==
The Mouths of Babes and Demons:

- Tony Todd as William
- Sage Arrindell as Brooklyn

Ruby Gates:

- London Brown as David Burr
- Donny Lucas as Paul Bradford
- Rachael McLaren as Staci Bradford
- Jahron Wilson as Ethan Bradford
- John B. Lowe as Joe
- Arne MacPherson as Mickey
- Ernie Pitts as Det. Powers
- Dennis Scullard as Creepy Clown

The Bunker:

- Cooper Huckabee as Delton Wilbury
- Tim Nhlazane as Zoo Worker Clyde
- Stephanie Sy as Anna
- Jayden Sharpe as Miles

Operatic:

- Savannah Basley as Chela Simpson
- Lynn Whitfield as Marie Benoit
  - Charity Sanderson as Young Marie
- Jaime M. Callica as Park
- Natasha Burnett as E-Lips
- Manny Sylvester as Old Black Man
- Veronica Ternopolski as Carmen Female Wraith
- Costa Ginakes as Carmen Male Wraith
- Kevin Klassen as Opera Director

Dope Kicks:

- Patrick Emmanuel Abellard as Percy Woodhouse
- Eugene Baffoe as Big Mike
- Ese Atawo as Connie Conjure
- Djouliet Amara as Newscaster / Angel / Grace / Coroner Rasta Russ
- Alec Carlos as Victor
- Brianna Ray Ferguson as Demon
- Solange Sookram as Baby Girl
- Cherissa Richards as Kelly
- Ayo Solanke as Teen #1
- Matthew Lupu as Teen #2
- Ernesto Griffith as Police Officer
- Moses Suzuki as Doctor #1
- Kevin Harris as Doctor #2
- Rita Deverell as Momma Conjure
- Graham Ashmore as Coroner Phil

== Production ==
Describing the film, Cundieff told the podcast Pod of Madness, "The stories, you know, they're not as big as the first Tales. But I do think that the stories are stronger, overall, than the second one, and the look of the film is better, a lot to do with the locations that we found." The film was shot in Winnipeg, Canada.

== Reception ==
Tales from the Hood 3 received mixed critical reception, being seen as an improvement over its predecessor but falling short of the first installment. Rotten Tomatoes reported a 41% approval rating.

== Future ==
On October 29, 2020, in an interview with Indie Wire, Cundieff and Scott expressed interest in a fourth movie as well as a TV show based on the series, revealing that they had been trying to produce one for several years.

== See also ==
- List of hood films
