= How to Make It in America =

Television series

- Created by: Ian Edelman
- Starring: Bryan Greenberg; Victor Rasuk; Scott Mescudi; Lake Bell; Luis Guzmán; Eddie Kaye Thomas; Shannyn Sossamon
- Opening theme: "I Need a Dollar" by Aloe Blacc
- Country of origin: United States
- Original language: English
- No. of seasons: 2
- No. of episodes: 16

Production
- Executive producers: Mark Wahlberg; Stephen Levinson; Rob Weiss; Julian Farino; Jada Miranda; Ian Edelman
- Producer: Joseph Zolfo
- Running time: 24–30 minutes
- Production companies: HBO Entertainment; Leverage Entertainment; Closest to the Hole Productions; Big Meyer

Original release
- Network: HBO
- Release: February 14, 2010 – November 20, 2011

How to Make It in America is an American comedy-drama television series that ran on HBO from February 14, 2010, to November 20, 2011. The series follows the lives of Ben Epstein (Bryan Greenberg) and his friend Cam Calderon (Victor Rasuk) as they try to succeed in New York City's fashion scene. The show's second season premiered on October 2, 2011.

On December 20, 2011, HBO announced the cancellation of the show citing failure to generate a large audience and buzz. Executive producer Mark Wahlberg expressed hope in an interview for GQ magazine in January 2012 that the show would return on another network.

== Synopsis ==
How to Make it in America followed two enterprising twenty year olds hustling their way through New York City, determined to achieve their vision of the American dream. Trying to make a name for themselves in New York's competitive fashion scene, Ben Epstein (Greenberg) and his friend and business partner Cam Calderon (Rasuk) use their street knowledge and connections to bring their ambitions to fruition. With the help of Cam's cousin Rene (Guzman), who is trying to market his own energy drink, and their well-connected friend Domingo (Kid Cudi), the entrepreneurs set out to make it big, encountering obstacles along the way that will require all their ingenuity to overcome.

== Cast and characters ==
=== Main cast ===
- Bryan Greenberg as Ben Epstein
- Victor Rasuk as Cam Calderon
- Lake Bell as Rachel Chapman
- Eddie Kaye Thomas as David "Kappo" Kaplan
- Scott 'Kid Cudi' Mescudi as Domingo Brown
- Luis Guzmán as Rene Calderon
- Margarita Levieva as Julie
- James Ransone as Tim
- Martha Plimpton as Edie Weitz
- Shannyn Sossamon as Gingy Wu (Season 1)
- Gina Gershon as Nancy Frankenburg (Season 2)
- Nicole LaLiberte as Lulu (Season 2)
- Julie Claire as Robin (Season 2)
- Joe Pantoliano as Felix De Florio (Season 2)
- Eriq La Salle as Everton Thompson (Season 2)
- Andrea Navedo as Debbie Dominguez (Season 2)

=== Recurring cast ===
- Joy Suprano as Christen (Season 2)

== Production ==
Ian Edelman wrote the pilot, which the Entourage crew of Mark Wahlberg, Stephen Levinson, Rob Weiss and Julian Farino executive produced. Edelman and Jada Miranda were also executive producers. "This show is a fun ride through the downtown scene, examining the cross section of people and how they relate to the relevant subcultures in NYC," Weiss, who was executive producing the pilot, told the Hollywood Reporter.

HBO made a free early online-only premiere available on various video sites including iTunes and YouTube. Season 2 premiered on HBO on October 2, 2011.

=== Title sequence ===
The opening title sequence was created by Isaac Lobe and directing duo Josh & Xander and produced by @radical.media. The theme song, "I Need a Dollar", was performed by Aloe Blacc of Stones Throw Records. Shot in New York City, the sequence comprises a video and photography montage, bringing together the show's underlying themes of "grit, hunger, ambition, the multicultural whirl of New York and the culture-transcending pursuit of the almighty dollar".

== Episodes ==
=== Season 1 (2010) ===
No. overall	No. in season	Title	Directed by	Written by	Original release date	US viewers (millions)
1	1	"Pilot"	Julian Farino	Story by : Ian Edelman; Teleplay by : Ian Edelman and Rob Weiss	February 14, 2010	N/A
When his skateboard-deck business venture hits the wall, 20-something graphic designer Ben agrees to fund a "sure thing" leather jacket hustle proposed by his good-times best friend, Cam. The partner's scheme morphs into downright desperation when Cam's cousin Rene gets out of jail, looking for payback of an old loan. Meanwhile, Ben is bummed to discover that his ex-girlfriend Rachel is now dating a hot hotelier named Darren, and finds little comfort in his horny pursuit of a sexy Jane during her late-night party. With Rene threatening bodily injury if Cam and Ben don't pay back the loan, a schoolmate-turned hedge-fund millionaire named David Kaplan ends up saving the day at least for the moment.
2	2	"Crisp"	Julian Farino	Rob Weiss	February 21, 2010	N/A
Using $3,000 they got via yet another (very) high-interest loan from Rene, Ben and Cam buy up a roll of (hot) premium-denim material, then hit a series of dead ends in their search to find a manufacturer to make samples of their "Crisp" brand of retro-70s jeans. Along the way they parlay a crashed late-night dinner with a top fashion designer into a brainstorming meeting that may, or may not, hold the key to their entrepreneurial success. Meanwhile, both Ben and Rachel realize that they haven't totally moved on and vow to try harder in the future.
3	3	"Paper, Denim + Dollars"	Julian Farino	Ian Edelman	February 28, 2010	N/A
Rene tries to buy out his marketing partners. Rachel rethinks her future after reconnecting with a friend, who returned from Africa. Ben and Cam work on finding a tailor and money to make a sample of their designed jeans.
4	4	"Unhappy Birthday"	Julian Farino	Ian Edelman & Norman Morril	March 7, 2010	N/A
Edie, Rachel's boss, is throwing her a birthday party, and Ben is upset to learn that Rachel's new boyfriend Darren is going to attend it. Ben tries to occupy his time by hanging out with Kaplan, Cam, and Domingo.
5	5	"Big in Japan"	Joshua Marston	Arty Nelson & Donal Lardner Ward & Rob Weiss	March 14, 2010	N/A
Ben and Cam meet with Haraki, a Japanese buyer, but their sample jean didn't turn out the way they had wanted. But Haraki likes Ben's tee that he designed back in high school and Haraki orders 300 pieces for Wednesday. Rene has trouble locating a huge pile of cash. Rachel and Darren experiment with Ecstasy, which results in Darren kissing men, dogs and other women. Darren loses some of Rachel's respect and she starts to fancy Ben again.
6	6	"Good Vintage"	Jonathan Levine	Seth Zvi Rosenfeld & Ian Edelman	March 21, 2010	0.83
Ben and Cam worry about filling their quota for Haraki, but a retail employee Julie helps them out. After a ride together, Darren asks Rachel to move in with him. Also, Rene wants to confront the man who stole his money.
7	7	"Keep On Truck'n"	Danny Leiner	Sarah Treem & Rob Weiss	March 28, 2010	0.57
Ben and Julie get closer. Ben and Cam agree to help Rene out with handing out the drink and Rene works on getting more distributing rights for the drink. Rachel starts to miss Ben.
8	8	"Never Say Die"	Julian Farino	Ian Edelman & Rob Weiss	April 4, 2010	0.64
Cam suspects Rene of having something to do with the theft of the truck. Rachel makes a life-changing decision.

=== Season 2 (2011) ===
No. overall	No. in season	Title	Directed by	Written by	Original release date	US viewers (millions)
9	1	"I'm Good"	Julian Farino	Ian Edelman	October 2, 2011	0.47
Ben and Cam return to New York City from their trip to Japan and start organizing a pop-up shop party to advertise Crisp. Things take a turn for the worse when Ben gets intoxicated after unwittingly smoking marijuana laced with PCP and the duo end up missing their big show. Rachel comes back to NYC from Africa.
10	2	"In or Out"	Julian Farino	Joey Soloway	October 9, 2011	0.46
Ben and Cam try to find a more experienced sales representative for their clothing brand. Rachel gets a new job but the post unnerves her. Rene gets hooked on the idea of launching a promotional campaign for his drink with a skateboarding stunt performance and soon chooses the suitable stuntman.
11	3	"Money, Power, Private School"	Simon Cellan Jones	Vince Calandra	October 16, 2011	0.63
Cam meets Lulu's father, Felix, a well-known artist who invites Cam to taste his pasta. Rene sets up his video shoot that will feature Debbie in short shorts, focusing of her behind; she brings her daughter to watch. Ben asks Julie the ultimate question, "Are we cool?" Rachel and Domingo go a few steps down the road to romance, and Nancy asks Ben and Cam to design the class T-shirt for a private middle-school graduation.
12	4	"It's Not Even Like That"	Julian Farino	Seth Zvi Rosenfeld	October 23, 2011	0.48
Relationships: a wedding, romances, a breakup, and an upset stomach. Kappo worries about a wedding toast he's to give. Rachel gives Ben a gift she's brought from Paris; he makes it clear he wants a platonic relationship. They go to a wedding together on Long Island and have great time. Where does that leave Domingo? Rene's video has gone viral so he needs cash to pay for a large order of the drink — but he's spent his stash on a gift for Debbie. Nancy comes through for CRISP but she wants newer photos of their line, so Cam approaches Felix, looking for a big favour.
13	5	"Mofongo"	Miguel Arteta	Arty Nelson & Donal Lardner Ward	October 30, 2011	0.57
Ben and Cam charm two young out-of-towners; Rene tries to make amends with Debbie; Rachel goes from lost to alive in a single day.
14	6	"I'm Sorry, Who's Yosi?"	Simon Cellan Jones	Ariel Schrag	November 6, 2011	0.58
Nancy sets Ben and Cam up with a manufacturer; Rachel pursues an edgy story;
15	7	"The Friction"	Danny Leiner	Joey Soloway	November 13, 2011	0.56
Ben and Cam debate CRISP's future; Rene tracks down the origin of the drink tincture; Rachel celebrates a setback.
16	8	"What's in a Name?"	Simon Cellan Jones	Ian Edelman	November 20, 2011	0.56
Ben looks to stitch CRISP back together. Domingo and Cam try to clear the drinks name; Rachel gets advice from Edie.

== Reception ==
The first season received mixed reviews. On Metacritic it has a score of 60% based on reviews from 26 critics. David Hinkley of the New York Daily News gave the show a positive review, giving the show 4/5 stars, and calling it a "winner". Brian Lowry of Variety was doubtful of the series, stating "barring a dramatic leap in quality" it probably wouldn't last on pay cable. Mark Perigard of the Boston Herald wrote critically, saying "this sad sack of a show plays like an East Coast, economically challenged version of his HBO hit Entourage." Randee Dawn of The Hollywood Reporter said the show "isn't as textured and riveting as it thinks it is". Other reviews favored the show in comparison to Entourage.

The second season did not get much positive reception. On Metacritic only two reviews are listed but both reviews are positive. Maureen Ryan of Huffington Post wrote the show has "a little more discipline and focus than they did in season 1." Phillip Maciak of Slant Magazine also added that the show is "anchored by gorgeous production design and the pop naturalism of its performances, How to Make It in America dramatizes this particular cultural moment with uncommon style and a little grace as well."
