= Patrick McGaw =

American actor (born 1967)

- Born: September 13, 1967 (age 58); United States
- Occupation: Actor
- Years active: 1993–2008

Patrick McGaw (born September 13, 1967) is an American actor. He is best known for his role as Neutron in the 1995 film The Basketball Diaries and as Doug Gordon in the 1996 film Malicious.

McGaw appeared in the films Amongst Friends (1993) (his first acting credit), Scorpion Spring (1996) and Dream with the Fishes (1997). From 1997 to 1998, he was a regular cast member on the Steven Bochco-produced police drama Brooklyn South, playing Terry Doyle. He then guest starred in the series CSI: Crime Scene Investigation in 2008, which is his last acting credit to date.

== Filmography ==
=== Film ===
Year	Title	Role	Notes
1993	Amongst Friends	Trevor	
1994	The Beans of Egypt, Maine	Beal	
1995	The Basketball Diaries	Neutron	
1995	Scorpion Spring	Zac Cross	
1995	Malicious	Doug Gordon	
1996	The Funeral	The Mechanic	
1997	Dream with the Fishes	Don	
2001	Cookers	Merle	

=== Television ===
Year	Title	Role	Notes
1997–1998	Brooklyn South	Terry Doyle	16 episodes
2000	Chicken Soup for the Soul	Jack Doyle	Episode: "Thinking of You/Mama's Soup Pot/The Letter"
2008	CSI: Crime Scene Investigation	Cody Latshaw	Episode: "Bull"

=== Video games ===
Year	Title	Role
2007	CSI: Hard Evidence	Cody
