= Dan Mintz (executive) =

American film director

- Occupations: Film executive, film director, film producer
- Years active: 1989 – present
- Organization: DMG Entertainment

Dan Mintz (born 1965) is an American film executive, film director, film editor, cinematographer, and film producer. He is the founder and CEO of DMG Entertainment. Mintz has also directed independent films such as Cookers (2001) and American Crime (2004).

== Career ==
Mintz went to China for the first time in 1989 to shoot part of a TV commercial. He co-founded DMG Entertainment in 1993 with Bing Wu and Peter Xiao. The company started doing shoots for TV commercials in the early 1990s. By the early 2000s, DMG developed into a major marketing and advertising company in China, and it had offices in five cities. When Mintz arrived in China, he was a "...freelance commercial director with no contacts, no advertising experience, and no Mandarin". Initially, he flew between New York City and Beijing, but in 1993, he moved to China full time. As few Chinese directors had his US experience, Mintz was able to win commercial shooting contracts for Budweiser, Unilever, Sony, Nabisco, Audi, and Kraft, with a big success being winning the Volkswagen brand campaign for 2004 in China.

Through DMG Mintz has acquired several intellectual properties such as Valiant Comics (founded in 1989 by Jim Shooter) and The Stormlight Archive (a series of novels written by Brandon Sanderson).
