= Malicious (1995 film) =

- Video release poster
- Directed by: Ian Corson
- Written by: Raul Inglis; George Saunders
- Produced by: Robert Vince; William Vince; Michael Strange
- Starring: Molly Ringwald; John Vernon; Patrick McGaw; Mimi Kuzyk; Sarah Lassez
- Cinematography: Michael Slovis
- Edited by: Richard Martin
- Music by: Graeme Coleman
- Production company: Keystone Entertainment
- Distributed by: Republic Pictures
- Release date: November 7, 1995
- Running time: 92 minutes
- Countries: Canada; United States
- Language: English

Malicious is a 1995 erotic thriller film starring Molly Ringwald and Patrick McGaw.

The film's main villain has been discussed by psychiatrists and film experts, and has been used as a film illustration for the psychiatric entity known as borderline personality disorder.

== Plot ==
A star college baseball player has an affair with a disturbed medical student who begins stalking him.

== Cast ==
- Molly Ringwald as Melissa Nelson
- Patrick McGaw as Doug Gordon
- John Vernon as Detective Pronzini
- Mimi Kuzyk as Mrs. Gordon
- Sarah Lassez as Laura
- Rick Henrickson as Rich
- Jennifer Copping as Judy
- Stephen E. Miller as Coach
- Joe Maffei as Professor Lesher
- Michael Ryan as Mitchell James
- Jerry Wasserman as Detective #1
- Jay Brazeau as Orderly
- Marlene Worrall as Mrs. Nelson
- Paul Anthony McLean as Patrolman
- Judith Maxie as Doctor
- Philip Maurice Hayes as Detective #2
- Will Sasso as Heavy Guy
