= Sins of the Mind =

1997 television drama film

- Original Paramount Television poster
- Genre: Drama; Psychological drama
- Written by: Sharon Elizabeth Doyle
- Directed by: James Frawley
- Starring: Jill Clayburgh; Mike Farrell; Cyia Batten; Missy Crider; Robert Pine
- Music by: David Bergeaud; Jennifer Warnes
- Country of origin: United States
- Original language: English

Production
- Executive producers: Mike Farrell; Marvin Minoff
- Producer: Chip Masamitsu
- Production locations: San Diego, California, USA
- Cinematography: Billy Dickson
- Editor: Chip Masamitsu
- Running time: 93 minutes
- Production companies: Paramount Television; USA Pictures; Wilshire Court Productions; Digital Magic Company

Original release
- Release: June 11, 1997

Sins of the Mind is a 1997 American psychological drama made-for-television film directed by James Frawley for Paramount Television, featuring the topics of sex addiction and neurotrauma. Starring Mike Farrell (who also served as executive producer), Jill Clayburgh and Missy Crider as the main characters, the film follows the story of a young girl from an artistically gifted but pretentious family who ends up in a car crash on the way home from a renaissance fair, suffering psychological issues and brain damage as a result. Sins of the Mind heavily featured the song "Up Where We Belong" by Joe Cocker and Jennifer Warnes, while surrounding soundtracks were created by David Bergeaud.

== Plot ==
The Wideners are an upper-middle-class family of artistically gifted individuals, consisting of photographer father William Widener (Farrell), socialite mother Eve Widener (Clayburgh), and daughters Michelle and Allegra Widener (Crider and co-actress Cyia Batten, respectively). Michelle is a successful commercial artist who chooses to live at home with her parents, but still earns money. Allegra often feels like she is living in Michelle's shadow, and that her parents are pretentious and have constantly fawned over Michelle's prodigious abilities since childhood. The family enjoys a renaissance fair one afternoon. Michelle stays later, getting a ride with friends when the car crashes and Michelle is left comatose. Her family, horrified, wait day and night for her to regain consciousness. While singing "Up Where We Belong" by Jennifer Warnes (a favourite family song), the Wideners are surprised and delighted to find out that Michelle has awoken.

Michelle seems normal, and a brain scan reveals no lasting damage, but she exhibits extremely childlike behaviours and noticeable sexual promiscuity. While in the hospital, she hits on a male nurse, French kissing him and fondling him. Her parents, none the wiser, take her home and have a pool party in her honour, but Eve is shocked when Michelle eats a whole bowl of strawberries and then asks for whipped cream, as well.

Michelle is sexually frustrated at the party, upset when boys she likes are seen with other girls. Sneaking out at night, she bumps into a neighbour, Edward, walking his dog in the forest; the two begin a sexual affair that they make minimal effort to conceal. Allegra is disgusted when she walks in on Michelle later initiating sex with an uncle, and when Edward's wife finds out about his infidelity, she calls Michelle a slut and breaks off her friendship with the Wideners. Allegra moves out, and Eve and William discover that Michelle has been shoplifting and stealing family heirlooms.

Michelle is distraught when her parents try to take her to a brain damage clinic, where it is revealed that her initial CAT scan may have missed an undetected lesion or head trauma from the car crash that affects her impulse control. Michelle is especially bothered by the "freaks" she sees in the clinic, people who are physically debilitated by brain damage and unable to cognitively function. Losing employment after inappropriate behaviour, and tired of her family's rules, Michelle moves out of the house and finds solace in sex work as a prostitute, where she is taken advantage of by a physically abusive pimp.

William misses Michelle and learns from Edward that she is living in a room at a brothel. At the brothel, the pimp assaults William, and Michelle flees, returning home out of guilt for what happened to her father. She enters unconventional treatment for sex offenders exhibiting impulse control; all of them are male and former convicts from lower-class upbringings, something that the Wideners object to, but Michelle, the lone female nymphomaniac of the group, finds that she and the other members of the therapy group are kindred spirits. She helps one man in particular who has the impulse to rape women who refuse a relationship with him, teaching him how to respect the wishes of others and earn respect from women.

Despite her progress, Michelle's expensive psychiatric drugs and therapy will be cut off by her insurance provider, leading her to run away from home again. William and Eve later find her living in a homeless shelter, filthy, panicked and covered in dirt. She is brought back home, where she is able to receive therapy again. Allegra returns home after William apologizes for ignoring her while Michelle gives a speech to her family and fellow therapy group members, explaining how her brain damage has changed her as a person.

== Cast ==
- Mike Farrell as William Widener
- Jill Clayburgh as Eve Widener
- Missy Crider as Michelle Widener
- Cyia Batten as Allegra Widener
- Robert Pine as Edward
- Grayson McCouch as Roger
- Louise Fletcher as Dr. Anna Bingham
- Chris Conrad as Peter
- David Grant Wright as Bob Richter
- Douglas Rowe as Dr. Kessler
- Jason Shutliff as Andy
- William Francis McGuire as Dr. Slater
- Carl Gilliard as Dylan Seidner
- Sandra Phillips as Aunt Sally
- Silas Weir Mitchell as Anderson

== Production ==
Sins of the Mind was filmed on location in San Diego, California. Despite receiving an R rating from the Motion Picture Association of America, the film was aired on television, advertised in magazines with a poster that featured an image of Missy Crider as Michelle Widener, with the caption, "if her addiction to sex offends you, you don't have to watch. (Her family didn't have that option)".

== Reception ==
Sins of the Mind was unfavourably received by critics and reviewers, who saw the film's explicit sexual tones and erotic scenes as inappropriate in light of the story's serious subject matter. Maj Canton of Radio Times felt that the actors, most of whom were from critically acclaimed media already, had not been given the opportunity to stand out, and called the film a "trashy TV movie, a tawdry exercise in cheap thrills." Amanda By Night of Made for TV Mayhem also criticized the film's overt sexuality in a story about brain damage awareness, adding, "at first Michelle just seems less censored and spunkier (keyword: spunk) and perhaps she is now a girl with a good appetite. But that appetite hungers for more than food and before you can say, “What’s the number to Nymphos Anonymous?” Michelle is having sex with almost any man who doesn't seem to mind taking advantage of a girl with brain damage. And that, my friends, turns out to be a lot of guys!" She praised Missy Crider's acting, however, commenting of the Michelle character, "the acting is fantastic, and Crider is phenomenal in the lead role. She is childish, vampy and confused all at once. The bigger her hair gets, the worse off she is (thank you, nineties TV). Aside from a few questionable moments (hey, is that a nymphomaniac sitting on her daddy’s lap?), she remains a captivating and sympathetic character." The film was not popular with viewers and was never released on DVD, although it was released in the United States and Argentina on VHS.
