= Ballers =

American comedy-drama series

- Genre: Comedy-drama; Sports
- Created by: Stephen Levinson
- Starring: Dwayne Johnson; Rob Corddry; John David Washington; Omar Miller; Donovan W. Carter; Troy Garity; London Brown; Arielle Kebbel
- Opening theme: "Right Above It" by Lil Wayne featuring Drake
- Country of origin: United States
- Original language: English
- No. of seasons: 5
- No. of episodes: 47

Production
- Executive producers: Dwayne Johnson; Dany Garcia; Mark Wahlberg; Peter Berg; Evan Reilly; Stephen Levinson; Rob Weiss; Denis Biggs; Julian Farino
- Producers: Bret Slater; Peter Sussman; David Levinson; Lori Jo Nemhauser; Karyn McKarthy; Neena Beber; Janace Tashjian
- Production locations: Los Angeles; New York; Miami; San Francisco
- Cinematography: Tobias Schliessler; Jamie Reynoso; Rodney Taylor
- Editors: Colby Parker Jr.; Jeffrey M. Werner
- Camera setup: Single
- Running time: 27 minutes
- Production companies: Closest to the Hole Productions; Leverage Entertainment; Seven Bucks Entertainment; Film 44; HBO Entertainment

Original release
- Network: HBO
- Release: June 21, 2015 – October 13, 2019

Ballers is an American sports comedy-drama series created by Stephen Levinson that aired for five seasons on HBO from June 21, 2015, to October 13, 2019. It stars Dwayne Johnson as a retired NFL player who must navigate his new career as the financial manager of other NFL players.

== Cast ==
=== Main ===
- Dwayne Johnson as Spencer Strasmore, an NFL player who is forced into retirement due to injury and embarks upon a new career as the financial manager of other NFL players
- Rob Corddry as Joe Krutel, a financial advisor at Anderson Financial who helps Spencer navigate his new life at the company
- John David Washington as Ricky Jerret, a highly competitive and spiritual NFL player
- Omar Miller as Charles Greane, an affable former NFL player who is searching for his next career
- Donovan W. Carter as Vernon Littlefield, a deeply family-oriented defensive end for the Dallas Cowboys
- Troy Garity as Jason Antolotti, a top-tier sports agent
- London Brown as Reggie, Vernon's childhood friend who handles his money
- Jazmyn Simon as Julie Greane, Charles' wife
- Arielle Kebbel as Tracy Legette (season 2; recurring seasons 1 & 5), a sportscaster for a local TV station who is intimately involved with Spencer
- Brittany S. Hall as Amber (seasons 4–5; recurring season 3), Ricky's past fling who later becomes his girlfriend and mother of his child

=== Recurring ===
- Carl McDowell as TTD, Ricky's friend, confidant, and assistant
- Dulé Hill as Larry Siefert, the GM for the Miami Dolphins
- Christopher McDonald as "Boss Man", an owner of the Dallas Cowboys
- Anabelle Acosta as Annabella Ruiz, Ricky's girlfriend
- Taylor Cole as Stephanie Michaels, an ESPN sideline reporter who is romantically involved with Spencer
- LeToya Luckett as Tina, the widow of one of Spencer's closest friends
- Ella Thomas as Kara Cooley, Alonzo's mother and an interior decorator who is also involved with Ricky
- Emayatzy Corinealdi as Candace Brewer, a high-powered sports executive who goes toe to toe with Spencer
- Antoine Harris as Alonzo Cooley, Ricky's passive-aggressive teammate
- Taylour Paige as Theresa, Julie's sister
- Sanai L. Johnson as Bey, Theresa's daughter
- Richard Schiff as Brett Anderson, the owner of Anderson Financial Management
- Clifton Collins, Jr. as Maximo Gomez, Angela's lawyer
- Angelina Assereto as Angela Lee, Maximo's client who was briefly involved with Spencer
- Robert Wisdom as Dennis Jerret, Ricky's estranged father who was a tight end during the 1985 Chicago Bears season
- Michael Cudlitz as Dan Balsamo, owner of Dan's Auto Collision and former Buffalo Bills running back who was injured by Spencer during a game
- Christine Allocca as Kerri Balsamo, Dan's wife
- Carmelo "Q" Oquendo as an NFL prospect
- Stephanie Sandri as herself
- Robert Crayton as Nick Kovack, a player cut from the team
- Terrell Suggs as himself
- Larry Csonka as himself
- Jay Glazer as himself
- Mark Schlereth as himself
- Katelyn Tarver as Jesse
- Serinda Swan as Chloe Day, a smart hotel management executive
- Andy García as Andre Allen, a high-ranking money manager who has a feud with Spencer
- Steve Guttenberg as Wayne Hastings Jr.
- Lisa Arturo as Nancy
- Peter Berg as the head coach of the Miami Dolphins
- Kristopher Lofton as Kisan Teague, a talented NFL running back whose off-field antics and entourage keep getting him in trouble
- Russell Brand as Lance Klians, the CEO of SportsX
- Catherine Haena Kim as Kate, the creative director of SportsX and Joe's love interest
- Amanda Rea as Donna, Jason's love interest and later fiancee

=== Athlete guest stars ===
Several of the athletes in the series are fictional. However, multiple real life athletes make appearances as themselves. Additionally, actor John Amos played a retired fictional player. Amos had a brief stint with the Kansas City Chiefs in the 1960s. Athletes who made appearances include:

- Stephen Curry
- Antonio Brown
- Alvin Kamara
- Von Miller
- Julian Edelman
- DeSean Jackson
- Jarvis Landry
- Jason Taylor
- Ndamukong Suh
- Eddie George
- Giancarlo Stanton
- Caroline Wozniacki
- Khalil Mack
- Danny Amendola
- Jared Goff
- Wes Welker
- Jeremy Shockey
- Odell Beckham Jr.
- Kelly Slater
- Tony Hawk
- Randy Couture
- Melvin Gordon
- DeAndre Hopkins
- Steven Jackson
- Dannell Ellerbe
- Rashard Mendenhall (also wrote 3 episodes)
- Jared Odrick
- Jon Beason
- Eric Hosmer
- LaMarr Woodley
- Victor Cruz
- Jason Pierre-Paul
- Chris Long
- Duke Johnson
- NaVorro Bowman
- Laquon Treadwell
- Vonn Bell
- Cris Carter
- Tim Brown
- Kemba Walker
- Nick Diaz
- Marcellus Wiley
- Calais Campbell
- Rodney Peete
- Rick Fox
- Dante Fowler
- Derwin James
- Malcolm Jenkins

== Episodes ==
Season	Episodes	Originally released	
Season	Episodes	First released	Last released
1	10	June 21, 2015	August 23, 2015
2	10	July 17, 2016	September 25, 2016
3	10	July 23, 2017	September 24, 2017
4	9	August 12, 2018	October 7, 2018
5	8	August 25, 2019	October 13, 2019

=== Season 1 (2015) ===
No. overall	No. in season	Title	Directed by	Written by	Original release date	U.S. viewers (millions)
1	1	"Pilot"	Peter Berg	Stephen Levinson	June 21, 2015	2.16
Former Miami Dolphins standout Spencer Strasmore and his friend Charles Greane must cope with the realities of life after football. Spencer starts working for a financial advisor, helping sign and mentor his younger friends still in the NFL, while Charles gets a job at a car dealership. Meanwhile, a mistake may cost Green Bay Packers wide receiver Ricky Jerret his roster spot when he's involved in an altercation at a nightclub.
2	2	"Raise Up"	Julian Farino	Evan Reilly	June 28, 2015	1.85
Spencer struggles to sign Vernon Littlefield as a client when he clashes with his childhood friend Reggie who handles all his money. Meanwhile, Jason works to renegotiate a contract extension for Vernon with the Dallas Cowboys, but has difficulties. During practice with his new Dolphins team, Ricky discovers that a teammate is not only unfriendly with him but is wearing his number. Now a struggling car salesman, Charles begins to wonder if he retired too early.
3	3	"Move the Chains"	Julian Farino	Evan Reilly	July 5, 2015	1.70
Spencer and Joe ask their boss, Mr. Anderson for permission to use his yacht to host a corporate event to entice potential clients. After a locker room prank goes too far, Ricky discovers the real reason his teammate, Alonzo, has it out for him. Charles grows bored with retirement and remembers his gridiron glory days. Meanwhile, at the party, Spencer and Reggie's rivalry reaches a boiling point when he tries to ruin his hospitality by insulting Spencer's adoptive upbringing.
4	4	"Heads Will Roll"	Julian Farino	Rob Weiss	July 12, 2015	1.59
In the aftermath of the corporate party, Joe struggles with a hangover and attempting to woo new clients on Mr. Anderson's yacht. Spencer is pressured to see a neurologist regarding his recurrent episodes from a TBI, while handling the conflict Reggie generates around Vernon's contract negotiations. Jason's dealings with the Dallas Cowboys bring in impressive figures that aren't enough for Reggie, and Vernon's inflated ego, and this puts Spencer on the line with their business and personal relationships. Also, Charles is bombarded by constant "sexting" from a woman he doesn't remember from the party.
5	5	"Machete Charge"	Seith Mann	Steve Sharlet	July 19, 2015	1.64
Spencer begrudgingly comes to Vernon's aid when he is targeted by a woman looking to blackmail him with some incriminating photos during the corporate event. However, her lawyer Maximo Gomez tells Joe his client wants a half million dollar pay-off. Meanwhile, Charles' marriage is on the rocks after Julie finds a picture of a nude woman on his cell phone, which he emailed to himself. On the advice of Annabella, Ricky tries to find common ground with Alonzo by taking him and his brothers to a strip club—his treat. But their spending gets out of hand and he comes up with a crazy plan to put a stop to it.
6	6	"Everything Is Everything"	John Fortenberry	Evan Reilly	July 26, 2015	1.81
Dealing with his own mental and financial problems, Spencer tries to balance Vernon and Ricky's issues, while Charles goes to Ricky's "funhouse" to escape the stress of his marriage. In order to drive Maximo's client, Angela Lee's price down, Joe negotiates with him on common ground at a horseracing track. Also, Ricky bares it all about the story behind his jersey number and his non-existent father during an interview with TV host Jay Glazer. Later, Spencer finally gives in to Tracy's concerns and gets an MRI.
7	7	"Ends"	Simon Cellan Jones	Rob Weiss	August 2, 2015	1.56
Spencer decides to take the hit for Vernon by offering up his own money to pay off Angela Lee into not releasing the photos. But when he and Joe meet Maximo to hand him the money, there's a catch. Life without Annabella is hard on Ricky, who flies off the handle in public again. Jason meets his mother's new young golfer boyfriend and thinks he is scamming her in order to represent him as his agent. Later, Spencer and Charles say goodbye to Rodney and spread his ashes onto his high school's football field.
8	8	"Gaslighting"	Simon Cellan Jones	Evan Reilly	August 9, 2015	1.71
Spencer must face up to his past with Angela Lee in order to save Vernon's future, and agrees to meet with her. Seeing the error of his promiscuous ways, Ricky tries to win back Bella, thinking a $400,000 "I'm sorry" ring will do it. Meanwhile, Charles puts his football skills to work at the car dealership when co-workers and customers bet he can't move an SUV in neutral. Also, Mr. Anderson gets a hold of the corporate event video and suspends Joe, who makes a permanent commitment to start his own financial firm.
9	9	"Head-On"	Julian Farino	Steve Sharlet	August 16, 2015	1.57
As Vernon's scandal gets cleared up, he learns about a negative incident involving Reggie. Joe reaches out to Mr. Anderson in vain and thinks he and Spencer should walk out on him. Spencer wrecks his car to try to make amends with a former player from his past. Ricky has a motivational video made for Charles, causing him to get back into football.
10	10	"Flamingos"	Julian Farino	Stephen Levinson & Evan Reilly	August 23, 2015	1.40
Spencer has to make an important decision for himself when Joe offers him a fresh start. Charles gets a second chance at getting back into the game. Jason and Spencer try to talk some sense into a confused Vernon.

=== Season 2 (2016) ===
No. overall	No. in season	Title	Directed by	Written by	Original release date	U.S. viewers (millions)
11	1	"Face of the Franchise"	Julian Farino	Evan Reilly	July 17, 2016	1.59
Convinced to appear on a talk show, Spencer ends up facing off with an old adversary, which puts his company and reputation in jeopardy. A reformed Ricky gets bad news in advance of his 30th birthday party. Charles relishes his new status as a fan favorite, but may face changes on the field.
12	2	"Enter the Temple"	Julian Farino	Evan Reilly	July 24, 2016	1.28
Spencer makes a play to poach a big client from Andre, his business rival, while struggling to find a quick fix for his physical ailments. Ricky considers where to head to next. Reggie fights for what he believes Vernon owes him. Feeling underpaid and undervalued, Tracy takes a stand with her boss. Charles gets insights from his coach.
13	3	"Elidee"	Julian Farino	Steve Sharlet	July 31, 2016	1.27
Spencer advises a reluctant Vernon to stay quiet when the truth behind his injury threatens his career. Trying to stave off Andre's attacks on their business, Spencer and Joe butt heads over how best to advise a client. Charles worries whether he's up for a challenge. A hard-to-impress Ricky takes a trip to tour a potential new home.
14	4	"World of Hurt"	Julian Farino	Rob Weiss	August 7, 2016	1.14
Spencer and Joe search for Andre's weakness; Vernon anxiously awaits news; Jason woos a client; Ricky attempts to understand his father; Charles gets the truth from Siefert.
15	5	"Most Guys"	Simon Cellan Jones	Neena Beber & Evan Reilly	August 14, 2016	1.21
Spencer tries to mentor Travis while dodging unwelcome medical news; Reggie and Joe buy a wild gift in an attempt to cheer up Vernon; Ricky encourages Charles to stand up for himself.
16	6	"Saturdaze"	Simon Cellan Jones	Rob Weiss	August 21, 2016	1.32
Spencer tries to broker peace between Travis and a critic; Charles is forced to deliver bad news; Joe attends a party at Andre's; Ricky is thrown for a loop by his dad.
17	7	"Everybody Knows"	Simon Cellan Jones	Rashard Mendenhall & Zach Robbins	August 28, 2016	1.01
Andre's surprise visit to the office sends Spencer scrambling to stay one step ahead of his rival. Meanwhile, Joe learns some unsavory secrets about his partner; Ricky tries to make up with his dad; and Charles schemes to keep a friend nearby.
18	8	"Laying in the Weeds"	Simon Cellan Jones	Steve Sharlet	September 11, 2016	0.87
As Spencer tries to move forward, Joe works to keep things together. Charles and Ricky clash. Travis faces tough questions and worries about his prospects. At his Draft Day party, Spencer asks for help while trying to keep ASM's latest developments quiet.
19	9	"Million Bucks in a Bag"	Julian Farino	Evan Reilly & Steve Sharlet	September 18, 2016	1.00
Spencer gets a surprising offer from Andre and asks Vernon for 5 million dollars; Ricky mulls where to put down roots; Vernon works overtime to return to the field; Charles and Julie clash over his busy schedule.
20	10	"Game Day"	Julian Farino	Evan Reilly & Steve Sharlet	September 25, 2016	1.10
Spencer makes a last-ditch effort to get back what he's lost. Ricky awaits a call that could define his future. Vernon takes a road trip. Siefert offers Charles a big opportunity, but it comes at a cost.

=== Season 3 (2017) ===
No. overall	No. in season	Title	Directed by	Written by	Original release date	U.S. viewers (millions)
21	1	"Seeds of Expansion"	Julian Farino	Rob Weiss	July 23, 2017	2.48
Spencer and Mr. Anderson cozy up to a Las Vegas bigwig; Ricky ponders fatherhood.
22	2	"Bull Rush"	David Katzenberg	Evan Reilly	July 30, 2017	2.58
Spencer pitches expansion in Las Vegas; Ricky rolls the dice; Vernon makes a risky endorsement deal.
23	3	"In the Teeth"	David Katzenberg	Carter Harris	August 6, 2017	2.28
Spencer takes his pitch on the road; Charles bristles over a slight; Ricky jumps to conclusions.
24	4	"Ride and Die"	David Katzenberg	Rob Weiss	August 13, 2017	2.48
Spencer looks to score a key owner's blessing for a Las Vegas team; tensions rise between Charles and Larry.
25	5	"Make Believe"	Chloe Domont	Evan Reilly	August 20, 2017	2.36
Spencer faces new worries over his expansion dream; Julie looks to end a feud with a home-cooked meal.
26	6	"I Hate New York"	Millicent Shelton	Steve Sharlet	August 27, 2017	2.85
Spencer, Joe and Mr. Anderson take a trip; Larry tests Charles' loyalty; Ricky presses Jason to close a deal.
27	7	"Ricky-leaks"	Rob Weiss	Rob Weiss	September 3, 2017	0.99
Spencer tries to limit the damage from Ricky's latest transgression and finds himself at odds with Anderson.
28	8	"Alley-Oops"	David Katzenberg	Rashard Mendenhall	September 10, 2017	0.93
Spencer reassesses his priorities; Charles takes matters into his own hands.
29	9	"Crackback"	Julian Farino	Evan Reilly & Steve Sharlet	September 17, 2017	0.93
Spencer's Las Vegas dream is jeopardized; Ricky arrives at a crossroads; Charles gets his wish.
30	10	"Yay Area"	Julian Farino	Evan Reilly	September 24, 2017	0.99
Spencer makes his pitch; Ricky maps out his future; Charles gets one more crack at a top job.

=== Season 4 (2018) ===
No. overall	No. in season	Title	Directed by	Written by	Original release date	U.S. viewers (millions)
31	1	"Rough Ride"	Julian Farino	Stephen Levinson & Rob Weiss	August 12, 2018	1.05
Spencer and Joe weigh the pros and cons of acquiring an extreme-sport agency. Ricky sets down roots in LA with Amber and their daughter, but finds himself yearning for something else. Charles rallies a group of disgruntled employees as he begins his new tenure with the Rams.
32	2	"Don't You Wanna Be Obama?"	Julian Farino	Stephen Levinson & Rob Weiss	August 19, 2018	0.91
Spencer becomes immersed in a marketing controversy. Still smarting from their feud in Miami, Charles agrees to give Ricky a chance despite his better
33	3	"This Is Not Our World"	Julian Farino	Stephen Levinson & Rob Weiss	August 26, 2018	0.99
Spencer looks to rein in Lance's excesses. Vernon gets carried away at a ceremony retiring his number at his LA high school, to Reggie's dismay.
34	4	"Forgiving Is Living"	Rob Weiss	Rob Weiss & Stephen Levinson	September 2, 2018	0.87
Spencer and Joe find themselves in a crisis at Sports X. Ricky considers his motivations in ending his retirement. Jason turns to Donna for help.
35	5	"Doink"	Rob Weiss	Chloe Domont & Zach Robbins	September 9, 2018	0.73
Spencer looks to elevate the Sports X TV brand, while Joe weighs a new offer. At Jayda's insistence, Spencer meets Quincy. Ricky tries to prove to Kisan he's still got the goods, while Charles is encouraged by Julie to bring more flair to his job.
36	6	"No Small Talk"	Simon Cellan Jones	Rashard Mendenhall	September 16, 2018	0.87
Spencer recruits Q to help him leverage a deal. With Reggie in tow, Joe talks business with some extreme skateboarders, collectively known as Illegal Civilization. Charles hosts a pre-free-agent reception.
37	7	"The Kids Are Aight"	Chloe Domont	Jason Lew	September 23, 2018	0.72
Spencer calls on the Anderson brothers for help. Joe pitches Illegal Civilization to a major shoe brand. Ricky loses his cool at a neighbor's pool party. Julie accuses an overworked Charles of being afraid to succeed.
38	8	"The Devil You Know"	Chloe Domont	Jason Lew	September 30, 2018	0.77
Spencer takes a big risk with the potential to blow the deal. After a heart-to-heart with Ricky, Charles spells out his vision for the team. Joe and Reggie enlist Vernon and Terrell Suggs to persuade Illegal Civilization.
39	9	"There's No Place Like Home, Baby"	Simon Cellan Jones	Stephen Levinson & Rob Weiss	October 7, 2018	0.60
Spencer takes his fight to the next level. Ricky jeopardizes his comeback.

=== Season 5 (2019) ===
No. overall	No. in season	Title	Directed by	Written by	Original release date	U.S. viewers (millions)
40	1	"Protocol Is for Losers"	Chloe Domont	Stephen Levinson & Rob Weiss	August 25, 2019	0.59
41	2	"Must Be the Shoes"	Chloe Domont	Rob Weiss & Stephen Levinson	August 30, 2019 (online); September 1, 2019 (HBO)	0.54
42	3	"Copernicursed"	Chloe Domont	Stephen Levinson & Rob Weiss	September 8, 2019	0.53
43	4	"Municipal"	Rob Weiss	Rob Weiss & Stephen Levinson	September 15, 2019	0.41
44	5	"Crumbs"	Rob Weiss	Stephen Levinson & Rob Weiss	September 22, 2019	0.45
45	6	"Edutainment"	Simon Cellan Jones	Jason Lew	September 29, 2019	0.46
46	7	"Who Wants a Lollipop"	Simon Cellan Jones	Rob Weiss & Stephen Levinson	October 6, 2019	0.46
47	8	"Players Only"	Chloe Domont	Stephen Levinson & Rob Weiss	October 13, 2019	0.50

== Ratings ==
Ballers : U.S. viewers per episode (millions)

Season	Episode number										Average
Season	1	2	3	4	5	6	7	8	9	10	Average
1	2.16	1.85	1.70	1.59	1.64	1.81	1.56	1.71	1.57	1.40	1.70
2	1.59	1.28	1.27	1.14	1.21	1.32	1.01	0.87	1.00	1.10	1.18
3	2.48	2.58	2.28	2.48	2.36	2.85	0.99	0.93	0.93	0.99	1.89
4	1.05	0.91	0.99	0.87	0.73	0.87	0.72	0.77	0.60	–	0.84
5	0.59	0.54	0.53	0.41	0.45	0.46	0.46	0.50	–		0.49

Audience measurement performed by Nielsen Media Research

== Broadcast ==
The series premiered in the United States on HBO on June 21, 2015, in Canada on June 21, 2015 on HBO Canada, in India on June 22, 2015 on HBO Defined, in the United Kingdom on September 8, 2015 on Sky Atlantic, and in Australia on September 15, 2015 on Showcase.

The second season premiered on July 17, 2016 and a third on July 23, 2017. On August 8, 2017, HBO picked up Ballers for a fourth season, which premiered on August 12, 2018. On September 6, 2018, HBO renewed the series for a fifth season.

== Reception ==
On Rotten Tomatoes, the first season has an approval rating of 81% based on 47 reviews, with an average rating of 6.43/10. The site's critical consensus reads, "Ballers may not be a game-changer, but it scores points with Dwayne 'The Rock' Johnson, who brings charm and depth to the NFL version of Entourage." On Metacritic, the season has a score of 65 out of 100, based on 35 critics, indicating "generally favorable reviews".

On Rotten Tomatoes season 2 has a rating of 70% based on 10 reviews, with an average rating of 6.65/10. On Metacritic, the season has a score of 63 out of 100, based on 4 critics, indicating "generally favorable reviews".

On Rotten Tomatoes, the third season has a rating of 67%, based on 6 reviews, with an average rating of 5/10.

== Home media ==
The series has been released on Blu-ray and DVD; season 1 on June 14, 2016, Season 2 on January 31, 2017, Season 3 on April 3, 2018, and Season 4 on January 29, 2019. Season 5's DVD and manufacture on demand Blu-ray was released on January 28, 2020 by Warner Home Entertainment and Warner Archive Collection respectively. In addition, the complete series box set was released on DVD the same day. In the United States, the series was added on August 15, 2023 on Netflix.
