= London Brown =

American actor

- Born: Los Angeles, California, U.S.
- Occupations: Actor, comedian

London Brown is an American actor, dancer, comedian, radio host, and impressionist. Born in Los Angeles, California, Brown is best known for his appearance on the HBO series Ballers (2015–2019). Brown also starred in the Starz television drama, Power Book III: Raising Kanan as Marvin Thomas.

== Career ==
At the 2013 Black Comedy Awards in the UK, Brown won Best International Comedian.

Brown started his television career as "D" on Fuse's The Hustle.

As a stand-up comedian, Brown has shared the stage with various artists.

== Filmography ==
=== Television ===
Year	Title	Role	Notes
2013	The Hustle	D	
2015-2019	Ballers	Reggie	
2021	Bronzeville	Ace Snyder	
2021–2026	Power Book III: Raising Kanan	Marvin Thomas	Main cast

Film

2019	Back to the Goode Life	Bobby	Notes
2016	Merry Ex-Mas	DeMarco	
2020	Tales from the Hood 3	David Burr	
