= Jana Marie Hupp =

American actress (born 1964)

- Born: April 2, 1964 (age 62); Spokane, Washington, U.S.
- Years active: 1985-2016
- Known for: Ed; Independence Day; Wild Oats; Galaxy's Child; Disaster; Public Morals
- Spouse: Brad Weston

Jana Marie Hupp (born April 2, 1964) is an American actress.

Hupp was born in Spokane, Washington. She studied at the North Carolina School of the Arts and Western Washington University and worked on stage in theatre productions in Seattle. She later relocated to Los Angeles and in 1985 made her feature debut in Vision Quest. She has been married to Brad Weston since April 18, 1992.

Her early television roles were on Scarecrow and Mrs King and My Sister Sam.

She had roles in Knots Landing, Brooklyn South and Public Morals. She appeared twice in Star Trek: The Next Generation, playing different characters. She appeared as Mindy Hunter-Farber in the TV sitcom Friends. She has also featured in the films Splash, Too, In the Line of Duty: Smoke Jumpers, The Devil Takes a Holiday and Independence Day. She is best known for her role on the NBC television program Ed as Nancy Burton, the friend of the protagonist, Ed Stevens. She had a guest appearance on Seinfeld as Sasha in The Conversion episode which was the 11th episode of the fifth season.

== Filmography ==
Film and television
Year	Title	Role	Notes
1985	Vision Quest	Sally	
1987	Hunter	Todd's Ex-Girlfriend	Episode: "A Child Is Born"
1988	Splash, Too	Buffy	
1991	Knots Landing	Susie Richfield	4 episodes
1991	Barton Fink	USO Girl	
1991	Star Trek: The Next Generation	Ensign Pavlik	Episode: "Galaxy's Child"
1991	Star Trek: The Next Generation	Lieutenant Monroe	Episode: "Disaster"
1992	A Different World	Lennox Baylor	Episode: "Sellmates"
1993	Seinfeld	Sasha	Episode: "The Conversion"
1995	Dave's World	Mother	
1994	Wild Oats	Liz Bradford	6 episodes
1995	Dave's World	Mother	Episode: "A Cut Above the Rest"
1995	All-American Girl	Lisa	Episode: "A Night at the Oprah"
1996	Friends	Mindy	Episode: "The One with Barry and Mindy's Wedding"
1996	Independence Day	SETI Technician #3	
1996	Public Morals	Val Vandergroot	12 episodes
1997	Brooklyn South	Yvonne Lowery	4 episodes
1998	Nash Bridges	Charlotte Ford	Episode: "Hot Prowler"
1998	The Drew Carey Show	Margaret	Episode: "Nicki's Wedding"
2000	Providence	Karen Potter	Episode: "Sibling Rivalry"
2000–2004	Ed	Nancy Burton	82 episodes
2012	Bones	Lisa Milner	Episode: "The Bod in the Pod"
