= Prentice Penny =

American director and producer

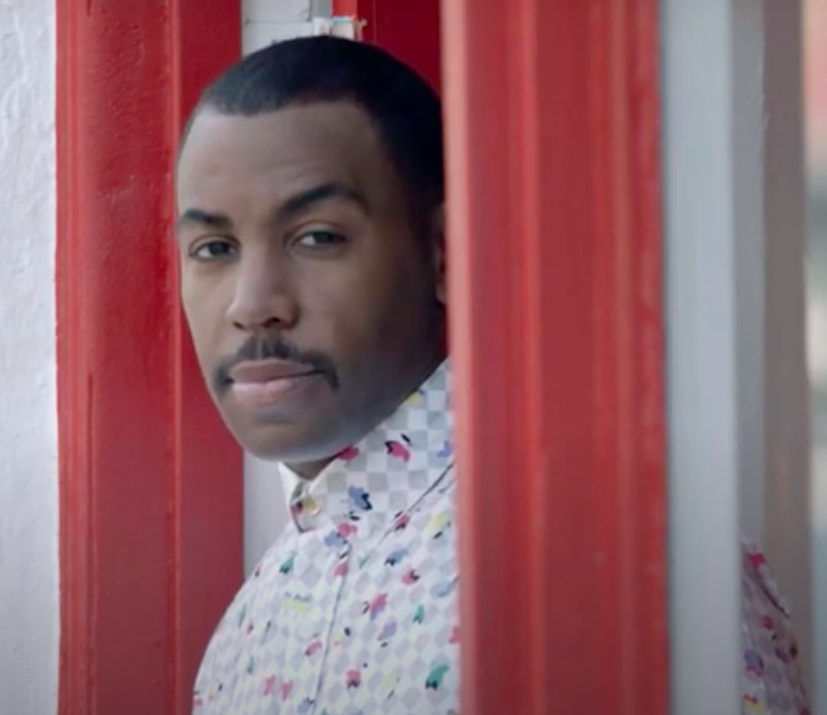
- Prentice Penny in 2017
- Born: December 1, 1973 (age 52); Los Angeles, California, U.S.
- Education: University of Southern California
- Occupations: Television producer; screenwriter; director
- Years active: 2005 - Present
- Parent: Brenda J. Penny

Prentice Penny (born December 1, 1973) is an American producer, writer and director. He is best known as the showrunner for the HBO series Insecure. He is the writer and director of the Netflix film Uncorked, and the creator and host of Upscale with Prentice Penny. He is also known as a writer and producer of the series Brooklyn Nine-Nine, Happy Endings, The Hustle, and Scrubs.

== Early life ==
Penny grew up in the Windsor Hill neighborhood of Los Angeles. His father ran a furniture business started by his grandfather in Compton. His mother, Brenda J. Penny, is a judge for the Los Angeles County Superior Court. He graduated in 1995 from the University of Southern California's screenwriting program, where he was a member of the African American Cinema Association. He worked as a substitute teacher before getting his first writing job in television.

== Career ==
Penny began his professional career as a writer's trainee on the show Girlfriends where he eventually became a staff writer. He moved on to work as a writer and co-producer on the series Do Not Disturb, where he was the only Black writer. He co-produced the series Scrubs before gaining his first producer credit on the series Breaking In. In 2013 he joined The Hustle as executive producer, then joined Brooklyn Nine-Nine as a co-executive producer and writer. In 2017 he created, produced and starred in the series Upscale with Prentice Penny, a lifestyle series focusing on conscious consumption. In 2016 he became the showrunner for HBO's Insecure, a role he has maintained for all of its seasons. In 2020 Insecure was nominated for eight Emmy Awards for its fourth season, including for Outstanding Comedy Series.

In March 2020, his first feature film Uncorked, a father/son story of an African-American man attempting to become a sommelier, premiered on Netflix.

As of July 2020, Penny had several new projects in the works. He will be partnering with Chernin Entertainment and Netflix to direct a holiday film, the idea for which came from Penny and his wife. He said, "When my wife Tasha and I came up with the idea, we felt that African-American movies centered around Christmas never got to play in the same ‘magical’ sandbox that traditionally white movies do, like The Santa Clause or Elf. We wanted to see images of ourselves portrayed in this genre and create a movie that black families could enjoy having themselves represented in for generations." He is also working with HBO to develop two new series: The Untamed, a culturally diverse epic fantasy based on a series of comic books set in the Asunda universe; and queens, a show set in New York City and focusing on the lives of immigrant women.

In 2021, Penny partnered with comedian Sam Jay to create PAUSE with Sam Jay for HBO, where he serves as executive producer. It was renewed in 2021 for a second season. It is confirmed that Penny will have an overall deal with Onyx Collective.

== Filmography ==
=== Film ===
Year	Title	Role	Notes
2020	Uncorked	Director/Writer	

=== Television ===
Year	Title	Role	Notes
2023	See It Loud: The History Of Black Television	commentator	
2021	PAUSE with Sam Jay	Executive Producer	
2016–2021	Insecure	Executive Producer	
2017	Upscale with Prentice Penny	Executive Producer	
2013–2015	Brooklyn Nine-Nine	Consulting Producer	co-executive producer - 21 episodes, 2013 - 2014
2013	The Hustle	Executive Producer	writer - 1 episode
2011–2013	Happy Endings	Producer	writer - 6 episodes
2009–2010	Scrubs	Co-Producer	writer - 2 episodes
2008	Do Not Disturb	Co-Producer	writer - 1 episode
2005–2008	Girlfriends	Writer	writer - 6 episodes

== Personal life ==
Penny is married to attorney Tasha Penny, whom he met in college at the University of Southern California. They have three children.
