= Wild Oats (TV series) =

American television sitcom

- Genre: Sitcom
- Created by: Lon Diamond
- Starring: Tim Conlon; Paul Stephen Rudd; Paula Marshall; Jana Marie Hupp; Christine Cavanaugh
- Composer: Ed Alton
- Country of origin: United States
- Original language: English
- No. of seasons: 1
- No. of episodes: 6

Production
- Executive producer: Lon Diamond
- Producer: Tim Steele
- Production companies: K-Rule Productions; 20th Television

Original release
- Network: Fox
- Release: September 4 – October 9, 1994

Wild Oats is an American television sitcom that aired Sunday nights on Fox in 1994.

== Overview ==
The series focuses on a group of twenty-something friends in Chicago: Jack, a photographer; Brian, a social worker; Shelly, a fifth-grade teacher; and Liz, a hairdresser.

Wild Oats aired on Fox at 9:30 ET on Sunday nights. Despite having the aging but still-popular Married... with Children as a lead-in, the new show drew small audiences against the other networks, who all ran highly-rated movies from 9pm onward. The comedy was canceled after only four episodes, leaving two others unaired.

== Cast ==
- Tim Conlon as Jack Slayton
- Paul Rudd as Brian Grant
- Paula Marshall as Shelly Thomas
- Jana Marie Hupp as Liz Bradford
- Christine Cavanaugh as Kathee

== Episodes ==
| No. | Title | Directed by | Written by | Original release date | Prod. code |
|---|---|---|---|---|---|
| 1 | "Pilot" | James Widdoes | Lon Diamond | September 4, 1994 | 2W79 |
| 2 | "Dream Date" | Stan Lathan | Tom Straw | September 11, 1994 | 2W01 |
| 3 | "Tickets" | Stan Lathan | Barbara Wallace & Thomas R. Wolfe | September 18, 1994 | 2W02 |
| 4 | "Slice o' Life" | Stan Lathan | Mark Nutter | September 25, 1994 | 2W03 |
| 5 | "Renaissance Woman" | Stan Lathan | Lon Diamond & Tom Straw | UNAIRED | 2W04 |
| 6 | "Move-In" | Stan Lathan | Mark Nutter | UNAIRED | 2W05 |
