= Rob Weiss =

American television producer

- Born: Baldwin, New York
- Occupations: Television and film producer; screenwriter; director; actor
- Years active: 1993–present
- Notable work: Ballers; Entourage; American Psycho; Amongst Friends

Rob Weiss is an American television and film producer, screenwriter, director, and actor. His break came in 1993 when he wrote and directed Amongst Friends. The film was well received, and Weiss was nominated for the Grand Jury Prize at the Sundance Film Festival.

== Life and career ==
Weiss, the eldest son of Lydia and Carl Weiss, was born in Baldwin, New York. He studied fashion and film at the Parsons School of Design but never graduated. Unemployed, he ended up living with his father in Lawrence in the Five Towns. He worked briefly as a nightclub promoter on Long Island.

Weiss attended Woodmere Academy with Doug Ellin, creator of the HBO series Entourage, and wrote for the show. He wrote or co-wrote episodes, including "Aquamansion", "The Bat Mitzvah", and "The Sundance Kids". He served as an executive producer or co-executive producer on 67 episodes.

In an August 2007 New York Observer interview with Ellin, he confirms that Weiss was the basis for the character of Billy Walsh, a perfectionist filmmaker who was a recurring character on the series. Ellin even asked Weiss if he'd play Walsh, but Weiss declined. Instead, the role went to Rhys Coiro, who looks similar to Weiss.

Weiss was an executive producer on the HBO series How to Make It in America.

In 2014, Weiss partnered with Davidoff to create the signature cigar line BG Meyer Cigar Co.; its launch was lauded by Cigar Aficionado. Deadline also reported that Weiss was tapped by Sonny Barger and Fox 2000 to write and direct the feature film Hells Angels.

Weiss wrote the story and produced the 2015 film adaptation of Entourage. He also served as an executive producer on 47 episodes of the HBO series Ballers from 2015 to 2019.

== Filmography ==
Film
Year	Title	Credit	Role	Notes
1993	Amongst Friends	Writer, Director, and Executive producer	Bobby	
1994	Jimmy Hollywood		Himself	
2000	American Psycho	Co-producer		
2006	Farce of the Penguins		Pissed Penguin	Voice role; direct-to-video
2015	Entourage	Writer and Producer		
Television
Year	Title	Credit	Episodes	Notes
2000	Hendrix	Writer		TV movie
2003	Punk'd	Producer	17 episodes	Season 1 and 2 only
2004-2011	Entourage	Writer: 20 episodes Executive producer: 44 episodes Co-executive producer: 20 episodes Producer: 15 episodes Co-producer: 7 episodes	96 episodes	Role: Audition producer (season 1, episode 8)
2010-2011	How to Make It in America	Writer: 4 episodes Executive producer: 13 episodes	16 episodes	
2015-2019	Ballers	Executive producer	47 episodes	
