= Public Morals (1996 TV series) =

1996 American television series

- Genre: Sitcom
- Created by: Steven Bochco; Jay Tarses
- Starring: Peter Gerety; Donal Logue; Bill Brochtrup; Julianne Christie; Jana Marie Hupp; Joseph Latimore; Justin Louis; Larry Romano
- Composers: Ben Decter; Mike Post
- Country of origin: United States
- Original language: English
- No. of seasons: 1
- No. of episodes: 13 (12 unaired)

Production
- Executive producers: Steven Bochco; Jay Tarses
- Producers: Dayna Flanagan; Stephen C. Grossman
- Production locations: Los Angeles, California
- Running time: 22–24 minutes
- Production companies: Steven Bochco Productions; 20th Century Fox Television

Original release
- Network: CBS
- Release: October 30, 1996

Related
- NYPD Blue

Public Morals is an American sitcom that aired its sole episode on CBS in October 30, 1996. Created and executive produced by Steven Bochco and Jay Tarses, the series was poorly received and was canceled after airing only one episode.

== Synopsis ==
The show is based around a group of mismatched detectives and others in New York City's vice squad. Among the actors who appear in the series are Peter Gerety and Donal Logue. Bill Brochtrup's character John Irvin, an administrative assistant, had been imported into the show from the drama NYPD Blue, and would return to NYPD Blue after the cancellation of Public Morals. Both Public Morals and NYPD Blue were produced by Steven Bochco.

== Cast ==
- Peter Gerety as Lieutenant Neil Fogarty
- Donal Logue as Detective Ken Schuler
- Bill Brochtrup as John Irvin
- Julianne Christie as Detective Corinne O'Boyle
- Jana Marie Hupp as Sergeant Val Vandergoodt
- Joseph Latimore as Officer Darnell "Shag" Ruggs
- Justin Louis as Detective Mickey Crawford
- Larry Romano as Detective Richie Biondi

== Reception ==
The original pilot episode of Public Morals was scrapped because critics and some CBS affiliates believed the language was too vulgar. However, the episode that did air was also poorly received. Critics argued that the characters were one-dimensional and that some of the humor involved racial stereotypes.

== Episodes ==
The fifth episode, "The White Cover", was originally the pilot.

No.	Title	Directed by	Written by	Original release date	Prod. code
1	"The Blue Cover"	Don Scardino	Jay Tarses	October 30, 1996	002
2	"The Yellow Cover"	Don Scardino	Lisa Albert	Unaired	003
3	"The Aqua Cover"	Don Scardino	Matt Tarses	Unaired	004
4	"The Red Cover"	Don Scardino	Beth Fieger Falkenstein	Unaired	006
5	"The White Cover"	Andy Ackerman	Jay Tarses	Unaired	001
6	"The Green Cover"	Don Scardino	Richard Dresser	Unaired	005
7	"The Purple Cover"	Don Scardino	Dan Greenberger	Unaired	007
8	"The Orange Cover"	Don Scardino	Alan R. Cohen & Alan Freedland	Unaired	008
9	"The Shrimp Cover"	Don Scardino	Richard Dresser	Unaired	009
10	"The Cornflower Cover"	John Ferraro	Lisa Albert	Unaired	010
11	"The Goldenrod Cover"	John Ferraro	Matt Tarses	Unaired	011
12	"The Camel Cover"	John Ferraro	Lisa Albert & Marc Flanagan	Unaired	012
13	"The Tuna Cover"	Jay Tarses	Richard Dresser	Unaired	013
