= Generate LA-NY =

Entertainment studio

Generate is a Los Angeles–based entertainment studio that produces content for distribution across media, including the Internet, television, web television, film, video games, mobile devices and books. The company completed a $6 million Series A round of funding backed by Velocity Interactive Group and MK Capital in March 2008, in addition to naming co-founding partner Jordan Levin CEO. Levin was formerly CEO of The WB. Generate opened an office in New York City in June 2008.

According to Levin Generate's business model is "about trying to syndicate [content] out to as many sites as possible and at the same time allow an advertiser or sponsor to travel with that content as it migrates across platforms."

Generate also has a management arm that represents entertainers including Patton Oswalt, Brian Posehn, Al Madrigal, Adam Rifkin, Arj Barker, Nat Coombs and Jon Reep.

On August 19, 2008, Generate debuted "Republicrats" in partnership with MSN. The Web series "follows the comedic presidential aspirations of Sean Masterson. Masterson’s political platform is his lack of one. His character doesn’t harbor any of those pesky strong opinions on topics of the day. There will be 24 episodes of Republicrats with new episodes launching twice a week" until Election Day 2008. Generate produced "Republicrats," which is hosted on MSN.

Other projects include "Chocolate News" with David Alan Grier which premiered on Comedy Central in October 2008, as well as Pink: The Series , a Web series about a female assassin played by Natalie Raitano.
