= American Crime (film) =

- Directed by: Dan Mintz
- Written by: Jack Moore; Jeff Ritchie
- Starring: Annabella Sciorra; Cary Elwes; Cyia Batten; Rachael Leigh Cook; Michael O'Neill; Kip Pardue; Frankie Ray
- Cinematography: Dan Mintz
- Edited by: Todd E. Miller
- Music by: Kurt Oldman
- Release date: 2004
- Running time: 96 minutes
- Country: United States
- Language: English

American Crime is a 2004 thriller film directed by Dan Mintz and starring Annabella Sciorra, Cary Elwes, Cyia Batten, Rachael Leigh Cook, Michael O'Neill, Kip Pardue and Frankie Ray.

It was produced by Jeff Ritchie. The film is presented in a documentary program style, taking off the style of series such as The FBI Files and The Young Detectives, both shows showcasing stories on crimes in America. The film is about reporters who try to solve a murder case that the police refuse to take on.

== Plot ==
After two female strip club workers disappear and are found dead later on, a team of reporters including Jesse St. Clair (Rachael Leigh Cook) and her camera operator Rob Latrobe (Kip Pardue) unearth a mysterious tape which shows the women being followed and later murdered by the cameraman. After investigating the cases further, the pair's producer Jane Berger (Annabella Sciorra) notifies the police but the sheriff refuses to help. The reporters on the team become targeted by the murderer and have other chilling tapes sent to them. The team are joined by the host of the hit television show American Crime, who assists them on their journey to uncover the true murderer, as a man was already sent to jail for the killings. With a disbelieving sheriff ignoring the case, the reporters must solve the crime themselves before they themselves are killed.
