= Sportin' Life (2020 film) =

2020 documentary film directed by Abel Ferrara

- Directed by: Abel Ferrara
- Produced by: Anthony Vaccarello; Gary Farkas; Clément Lepoutre; Olivier Muller; Diana Phillips
- Starring: Abel Ferrara; Willem Dafoe; Cristina Chiriac; Anna Ferrara; Paul Hipp; Joe Delia
- Cinematography: Sean Price Williams
- Edited by: Leonardo Daniel Bianchi; Stephen Gurewitz
- Music by: Joe Delia
- Production companies: Yves Saint Laurent; Vixens; Rimsky Productions
- Release date: 4 September 2020 (Venice)
- Running time: 65 minutes
- Countries: Italy; France; United Kingdom
- Language: English

Sportin' Life is a 2020 documentary film directed by Abel Ferrara. An Italian-French-British co-production, the film features Ferrara, Willem Dafoe, Cristina Chiriac, Anna Ferrara, Paul Hipp and Joe Delia.

It had its world premiere at the Venice Film Festival on 4 September 2020.

== Production ==
In June 2020, it was announced Ferrara had directed a documentary film titled Sportin' Life.

== Release ==
The film had its world premiere at the Venice Film Festival on 4 September 2020.
