= The Projectionist =

The Projectionist may refer to:

- The Projectionist (1970 film), an American comedy film
- The Projectionist (2019 documentary film), a Greek-American documentary film
- The Projectionist (2019 drama film), a Dominican drama film
- The Projectionist (2026 film), an American crime thriller film

== See also ==
- Projectionist, a person who operates a movie projector
