= Fiscella =

Fiscella is a surname of Italian origin. Notable people with the surname include:

- Andrew Fiscella (born 1966), American actor
- Nicole Fiscella (born 1979), American actress and model
