= Napoli, Napoli, Napoli =

- Directed by: Abel Ferrara
- Written by: Maurizio Braucci; Peppe Lanzetta; Gaetano Di Vaio
- Produced by: Pier Francesco Aiello; Gianluca Curti
- Starring: Luca Lionello; Salvatore Ruocco; Ernesto Mahieux; Shanyn Leigh; Giuseppe Lanzetta; Anita Pallenberg
- Cinematography: Alessandro Abate
- Edited by: Fabio Nunziata
- Release date: 8 September 2009 (Venice Film Festival)
- Running time: 102 minutes
- Country: Italy
- Languages: Italian; English

Napoli, Napoli, Napoli is a 2009 documentary film directed by Abel Ferrara about the problems in early 21st century Naples. Napoli, Napoli, Napoli depicts the city of Naples, filmed as a documentary with interspersed episodes of fiction.

== Release ==
The film premiered out of competition at the 66th Venice International Film Festival.

== Reception ==
Variety described the film as a "messy, tawdry blend of documentary and fiction" that "makes for a reasonably interesting if far from revelatory portrait of a city riddled by poverty and crime."
