= Ken Kelsch =

American cinematographer (1947–2023)

- Born: Kenneth Arthur Kelsch; July 8, 1947; New York City, New York, U.S.
- Died: December 11, 2023 (aged 76); Hackettstown, New Jersey, U.S.
- Education: Montclair State College; New York University; Rutgers University
- Occupation: Cinematographer
- Years active: 1972–2019
- Children: 4
- Military career
- Allegiance: United States
- Branch: United States Army
- Service years: 1965–69
- Rank: First lieutenant
- Units: Special Forces; Military Assistance Command, Vietnam – Studies and Observations Group
- Conflicts: Vietnam War

Kenneth Arthur Kelsch, ASC (July 8, 1947 – December 11, 2023) was an American cinematographer. He was best known for his guerilla filmmaking style and his career-spanning partnership with filmmaker Abel Ferrara, with whom he made more than a dozen films. He was nominated for the Independent Spirit Award for Best Cinematography for his work on Ferrara’s The Funeral (1996).

Prior to his filmmaking career, Kelsch served in the United States Army Special Forces during the Vietnam War, as a member of MACV-SOG.

== Early life ==
Kenneth Arthur Kelsch was born in Brooklyn on July 8, 1947, and grew up in East Newark and North Arlington, New Jersey. His mother was born in Scotland and his father was born in the Alsace region of France. He was raised Catholic. He took an early interest in photography: he had his own darkroom at 12 years old and his father showed him how to develop black and white photographs. While still in high school, his father died while Kelsch had been attending his first week of seminary and his mother was two weeks pregnant.

=== Military service ===
Kelsch enlisted in the United States Army in 1965. As a Green Beret, he was the executive officer of an A-team during the Vietnam War and participated in SLAM (Search, Locate, Annihilate, and Monitor) operations in Laos and CIA led cross-border operations in Cambodia. He was a first lieutenant within the Military Assistance Command, Vietnam – Studies and Observations Group. He was discharged in 1969.

=== Education ===
Kelsch studied photography at Montclair State College and New York University's Film & Television program, and attended Rutgers University.

After his discharge, Kelsch attended Montclair State University and worked for Johnson & Johnson making gaffer tape. He worked as a gaffer on Wes Craven's The Last House on the Left. He attended film school at New York University's Tisch School of the Arts, graduating with an M.F.A. in 1977. His cinematography professor was Beda Batka. He cited Conrad Hall, Gordon Willis, Michael Chapman, and John Cassavetes as influences.

== Film career ==
Between 1979 and 2019, Kelsch made 13 films with director Abel Ferrara, including his first mainstream film The Driller Killer, and the critically acclaimed feature films Bad Lieutenant (1992) and The Funeral (1996), for which he was nominated for an Independent Spirit Award for Best Cinematography.

On television, Kelsch was the director of photography for the pilot episode of the CBS crime drama series Hack (2002) and the first and second seasons of the NBC supernatural procedural drama series Medium (2005–06).

Kelsch also taught cinematography at Montclair State University, Hofstra and Five Towns College on Long Island.

== Personal life ==
Kelsch had four children, one of whom died before him. His second wife, Dale Denning, was his assistant at NYU.

=== Death ===
On December 11, 2023, he died of COVID-19-related pneumonia at a hospital in Hackettstown, New Jersey, at the age of 76.

== Filmography ==
=== Film ===
Year	Title	Director	Notes	Ref.
1979	The Driller Killer	Abel Ferrara		
1982	In Our Water	Meg Switzgable	Documentary	
1986	Spookies	Brendan Faulkner Thomas Doran Eugenie Joseph	with Robert Chappell	
1992	Bad Lieutenant	Abel Ferrara		
1993	Dangerous Game	Abel Ferrara		
1994	Drop Squad	David C. Johnson		
1995	The Addiction	Abel Ferrara		
1995	Condition Red	Mika Kaurismäki		
1995	Killer: A Journal of Murder	Tim Metcalfe		
1996	Big Night	Campbell Scott Stanley Tucci		
1996	The Funeral	Abel Ferrara		
1997	The Blackout	Abel Ferrara		
1998	Montana	Jennifer Leitzes		
1998	A Brooklyn State of Mind	Frank Rainone		
1998	The Impostors	Stanley Tucci		
1998	New Rose Hotel	Abel Ferrara		
1998	Susan's Plan	John Landis		
2000	It Had to Be You	Steven Feder		
2001	'R Xmas	Abel Ferrara		
2003	Testosterone	David Moreton		
2003	Asmali Konak: Hayat	Abdullah Oguz		
2003	Happy End	Amos Kollek		
2005	Missing in America	Gabrielle Savage Dockterman		
2005	Before It Had a Name	Giada Colagrande		
2008	Chelsea on the Rocks	Abel Ferrara	Documentary	
2008	100 Feet	Eric Red		
2008	Return to Sleepaway Camp	Robert Hiltzik		
2008	Sicak	Abdullah Oguz		
2009	Desert Flower	Sherry Hormann		
2011	4:44 Last Day on Earth	Abel Ferrara		
2013	House of Last Things	Michael Bartlett		
2014	Welcome to New York	Abel Ferrara		
2016	The Brooklyn Banker	Federico Castelluccio		
2019	The Projectionist	Abel Ferrara	Documentary	

=== Television ===
Year	Title	Notes
1999	Now and Again	Episode: "Origins"
2000	The $treet	3 episodes
2002	Hack	Pilot episode
2005-06	Medium	33 episodes

TV movies and miniseries

Year	Title	Director	Notes
1994	Assault at West Point: The Court-Martial of Johnson Whittaker	Harry Moses	
1996	The Prosecutors	Rod Holcomb	Unsold pilot
1996	Backroads to Vegas	Kirsten A. Bulmer	
1997	Subway Stories: Tales from the Underground	Various	
1997	Every 9 Seconds	Kenneth Fink	
1998	Rear Window	Jeff Bleckner	
1999	Invisible Child	Joan Micklin Silver	
2001	Private Lies	Sherry Hormann	

=== Music videos ===
Year	Title	Artist	Director	Ref.
1982	Betcha She Don't Love You	Evelyn "Champagne" King	Steve Kahn	
1990	King of New York	Schoolly D	Abel Ferrara	
1996	Nigger Entertainment	Schoolly D	Abel Ferrara	
1995	California	Mylène Farmer	Abel Ferrara	

== See also ==
- List of film director and cinematographer collaborations
