= Alive in France =

2017 French documentary film

- Film poster
- Directed by: Abel Ferrara
- Produced by: Nicolas Anthomé
- Starring: Abel Ferrara
- Cinematography: Emmanuel Gras
- Edited by: Leonardo Daniel Bianchi; Fabio Nunziata
- Music by: Joe Delia; Abel Ferrara; Paul Hipp
- Distributed by: Bathysphere Productions
- Release date: May 20, 2017 (Cannes)
- Running time: 79 minutes
- Country: France
- Languages: English; French

Alive in France is a 2017 French documentary film about American filmmaker Abel Ferrara touring and performing rock and roll with his band. The documentary was directed by Ferrara. It premiered as part of the 2017 Cannes Film Festival Directors' Fortnight.

== Participants ==
In addition to Ferrara, the following people appeared in the documentary:

- Joe Delia
- Paul Hipp
- Cristina Chiriac
- Dounia Sichov
- PJ Delia
- Laurent Bechad

== Production ==
The documentary was shot in Toulouse and Paris in October 2016.

== Reception ==
The film has a 20% rating on Rotten Tomatoes. Wendy Ide of The Guardian awarded the film three stars out of five.
