= Ariane Koizumi =

American model and actress

- Born: 1963–1964 (age 61–62); New York City, New York, U.S.
- Other names: Ariane
- Occupations: Actress, model
- Years active: 1983-2022
- Notable work: Year of the Dragon
- Height: 5 ft 11 in (180 cm)

Ariane Mitsuye Koizumi is an American fashion model and actress, sometimes credited as Ariane, who played the controversial lead role in the film Year of the Dragon.

== Biography ==
Koizumi was born in Riverdale, Bronx, a neighborhood in New York City. Her mother was a Dutch nurse and her father was a Japanese graphic artist. She started modeling at the age of fifteen, and in 1983 she dropped out of Parsons School of Design to pursue modeling full-time. By 1984 The New York Times, covering the Milan fashion shows, called Koizumi the "one model that none can keep their eyes off". The next year she appeared in Vogue, Harper's Bazaar, and Self, and the Sun-Sentinel noted that she had become "Giorgio Armani's favorite model".

Koizumi made her acting debut in the 1985 Michael Cimino film Year of the Dragon as Tracy Tzu, a Chinese American television reporter who falls in love with the fanatical cop Stanley White, played by Mickey Rourke. The Los Angeles Times summarized the character as "there to fulfill all Oriental-woman fantasies", and The New York Times called Koizumi "so ineffectual a part of the film's framework that she is even upstaged, in a nude scene, by a glimpse of the Brooklyn Bridge". Her performance in the film was so widely panned that it "nipped her budding film career", but she subsequently had a cameo in Abel Ferrara's King of New York and continued her modeling career with print work in Self, French Vogue, and the September 1989 cover of Mirabella, along with television commercials for Michelob, L'Eggs, and Levi's, and runway modeling for Karl Lagerfeld and Donna Karan.

Koizumi left modeling in 1989 to work as an intern for a record label, with the goal of pursuing a career in music. She later worked for the New York Prada store, and raised three children.

== Filmography ==
Year	Title	Role
1985	Year of the Dragon	Tracy Tzu
1990	King of New York	Ariane
1991	Women & Men 2	Alice
1993	Skin Art	Lin
1994	Robot in the Family	Dominatrix
