= Bad Lieutenant =

1992 crime-drama film directed by Abel Ferrara

- Theatrical release poster
- Directed by: Abel Ferrara
- Written by: Zoë Lund; Abel Ferrara
- Produced by: Edward R. Pressman; Mary Kane
- Starring: Harvey Keitel; Victor Argo; Paul Calderón; Robin Burrows; Frankie Thorn; Paul Hipp
- Cinematography: Ken Kelsch
- Edited by: Anthony Redman
- Music by: Joe Delia
- Production company: Edward R. Pressman Film Corporation
- Distributed by: Aries Films
- Release dates: May 14, 1992 (Cannes); November 20, 1992 (United States)
- Running time: 96 minutes
- Country: United States
- Languages: English; Spanish
- Box office: $2 million

Bad Lieutenant is a 1992 American neo-noir crime drama film directed by Abel Ferrara, from a screenplay co-written with Zoë Lund. It stars Harvey Keitel as the title character "bad lieutenant", an unnamed and corrupt New York police officer, who suffers a string of personal and spiritual crises.

The film premiered at the 1992 Cannes Film Festival, where it screened in the Un Certain Regard section. Due to its graphic violence and drug use, the film was released in the United States with an NC-17 rating. Despite limited theatrical distribution, it was praised by critics and has become one of Ferrara's best-known works. Martin Scorsese named this movie as one of the best movies of the entire 1990s.

A follow-up film entitled Bad Lieutenant: Port of Call New Orleans, also produced by Edward R. Pressman, was released in 2009. Despite sharing a title and a similar premise, it was described as being "not a remake".

== Plot ==
After dropping off his two young sons at Catholic school, an unnamed NYPD police lieutenant snorts cocaine before driving to the scene of a double homicide in Union Square. The lieutenant then tracks down a drug dealer and gives him a bag of cocaine from a crime scene; he has a small bag of crack cocaine fronted and smokes some while the dealer promises to give him the money he makes from selling the drugs in a few days. The lieutenant ends the day at a rundown apartment, where he gets drunk and engages in a threesome with two women. He then visits a red-haired female junkie and smokes heroin with her. In parallel events, a nun is raped inside a church by two young hoodlums.

The next morning, the lieutenant learns that he has lost a bet on a National League Championship Series baseball game between the New York Mets and the Los Angeles Dodgers. He tries to win back his money by doubling his wager on the Dodgers in the next game. At another crime scene, the lieutenant rifles through the victim's car and finds a hidden stash, which he stuffs in his coat pocket. However, the bag falls out onto the street in front of his colleagues. The lieutenant lies and says that he intended to enter the drugs into evidence, and orders them to do it on his behalf.

At a hospital, the lieutenant spies on the nun's examination and learns that she was penetrated with a crucifix. Later that evening, he pulls over two teenage girls who are using their father's car without his knowledge to go to a club. Aware that they are unlicensed, the lieutenant extorts the girls by having one of them bend over and pull up her skirt and the other to simulate oral sex while he masturbates. The following day, he eavesdrops on the nun's confession to her superior, where she says she knows who assaulted her but will not identify them.

While drinking and shooting drugs as he drives through Times Square, the lieutenant listens to the final moments of the Dodgers game and shoots out his car stereo in a drug-fueled rage when the Mets win. Despite being unable to pay the $30,000 wager, he doubles his bet for the next game. The lieutenant spends the last of his money on more drinks when the Dodgers lose again. After scoring cocaine in a nightclub, he tries to double his bet again but the runner refuses, insisting that his bookie would kill him.

The lieutenant picks up his $30,000 share from the drug dealer and calls the bookie personally to place his bet. They arrange to meet in front of Madison Square Garden. He then visits the red-haired junkie again for a final shot of heroin. At the church, he tells the nun that he will exact vengeance upon her attackers, but she repeats that she has forgiven them and leaves. In the resulting emotional breakdown, the lieutenant sees an apparition of Jesus and tearfully curses him before begging forgiveness for his crimes and sins. The figure is revealed to be a woman holding a golden chalice, which turns out to have been pawned at her husband's shop.

With the help of the woman, the lieutenant tracks the two rapists to a nearby crack den in Spanish Harlem and cuffs them together. The three men then smoke crack while watching the Mets win the pennant on a television. Instead of taking them to the station, he drives them to the Port Authority Bus Terminal and puts them on a bus with a cigar box containing the $30,000 and a promise not to return. After he leaves the terminal, he parks on the street in front of Penn Station. Another car drives up beside him, and the driver, presumably the bookie with whom the lieutenant had arranged to meet, fatally shoots the lieutenant before speeding off. A crowd begins to form as the police arrive.

== Cast ==
- Harvey Keitel as The Lieutenant
- Victor Argo as Bet Cop
- Paul Calderón as Cop One
- Leonard L. Thomas as Cop Two
- Robin Burrows as Ariane
- Eddie Daniels as Jersey Girl – Passenger
- Bianca Hunter (credited as Bianca Bakija) as Jersey Girl – Driver
- Zoë Lund as Zoe
- Vincent Laresca as J.C.
- Frankie Thorn as The Nun
- Fernando Véléz as Julio
- Joseph Micheal Cruz as Paulo
- Paul Hipp as Jesus
- Frank Adonis as Large
- Anthony Ruggiero as Lite
- Victoria Bastel as Bowtay

== Production ==
According to Zoë Lund:

There was a lot of rewriting done on the set. Two other characters were cut, and my character modulated and took on more and more. A lot of things had to be changed and improvised. The vampire speech – which is crucial to the Lieutenant – was written two minutes before it was shot. I memorized it and did it in one take. The speech is important because she is acute in knowing the journey the Lieutenant makes. She shoots him up, sends him off, knowing of his passion, she lets him go.

Lund avowed in an interview that she "co-directed" several scenes in the film. Lund also claimed that she wrote the screenplay of Bad Lieutenant alone and believed that Ferrara did not put much effort in his contributions in the film.

According to Jonas Mekas, Lund's ex-boyfriend Edouard de Laurot was reported to have written most of the film's script. David Scott Milton later vouched for this claim. Mekas even claimed he had "scribbles and notes to prove it".

Ferrara said in 2012 that he was using drugs during the making of the film:

The director of that film needed to be using, the director and the writer—not the actors.

The Special Edition DVD from Lions Gate has a special feature about the pre-, during, and post-production of the film, in which Ferrara explains the screenplay's genesis, its authorship, and its original brevity.

Christopher Walken was originally going to portray the titular character, having previously worked with Ferrara on King of New York.

== Alternate versions ==
Originally rated NC-17 and one of the few films to be rated thus on the basis of depictions of drug use and violence (the only other film being Comfortably Numb), the unedited cut's rating was described as being for "sexual violence, strong sexual situations and dialogue, graphic drug use".

Blockbuster and Hollywood Video, the largest video rental companies in the United States, had a policy prohibiting the purchase and rental of NC-17 films. An R-rated cut was created specifically so that Blockbuster and the other retailers would rent and purchase out the film. The R-rated cut was described with "drug use, language, violence, and nudity". The scene in which the Lieutenant pulls over two young girls and masturbates in front of them is almost completely absent from the Blockbuster version.

The original theatrical version featured the song "Signifying Rapper" by Schoolly D. The song was removed from some editions of the film's home video release due to the unauthorized use of a re-recorded guitar riff from Led Zeppelin's "Kashmir", which the rapper did not license.

=== Ban in Ireland ===
On January 29, 1993, the film was banned in Ireland. Sheamus Smith, who headed the Irish Film Censor's Office at the time, felt "the viewing of it would tend, by reason of the inclusion in it of obscene or indecent matter, to deprave or corrupt persons who might view it". The DVD release was banned for the same reason 10 years later.

== Reception ==
Bad Lieutenant has a 78% rating on Rotten Tomatoes based on 54 reviews, with an average rating of 7.2/10. The site's critics consensus reads: "Bad Lieutenant will challenge less desensitized viewers with its depiction of police corruption, but Harvey Keitel's committed performance makes it hard to turn away." Metacritic, which uses a weighted average, assigned the film a score of 70 out of 100, based on 19 critics, indicating "generally favorable" reviews. Writing in The New York Times, Janet Maslin praised Ferrara's talent for making "gleefully down-and-dirty films", continuing, "He has come up with his own brand of supersleaze, in a film that would seem outrageously, unforgivably lurid if it were not also somehow perfectly sincere." Desson Howe for The Washington Post called the Lieutenant "a notch nicer than Satan", and he cites Keitel's work as the film's saving grace, "It is only the strength of Keitel's performance that gives his personality human dimension."

Mark Kermode has mentioned that the film was praised as "a powerful tale of redemptive Catholicism". Roger Ebert gave the film four stars and stated that "in the Bad Lieutenant, Keitel has given us one of the great screen performances in recent years". Martin Scorsese named this movie as the fifth best movie of the 1990s.

== Followups ==
A narratively unrelated follow-up, Bad Lieutenant: Port of Call New Orleans, was released in 2009, seventeen years after the first film's release. The film was directed by Werner Herzog and stars Nicolas Cage and Eva Mendes. Herzog claimed it was "not a remake...It's like I keep saying, 'A James Bond film, the newest one, is not a remake of the previous one; it's a completely different story.'" Both films were produced by Edward R. Pressman.

In April 2025, Bad Lieutenant: Tokyo was announced to be in production by Neon with Takashi Miike directing.
