= Padre Pio (film) =

2022 film by Abel Ferrara

- US theatrical release poster
- Directed by: Abel Ferrara
- Written by: Maurizio Braucci; Abel Ferrara
- Produced by: Philipp Kreuzer; Maurizio Antonini; Diana Phillips
- Starring: Shia LaBeouf
- Cinematography: Alessandro Abate
- Edited by: Leonardo Daniel Bianchi
- Music by: Joe Delia
- Production companies: Maze Pictures; Interlinea Film; Rimsky Productions
- Distributed by: RS Productions (Italy); Dazzler Media (United Kingdom)
- Release dates: 2 September 2022 (Venice); 26 January 2024 (United Kingdom); 18 July 2024 (Italy)
- Running time: 104 minutes
- Countries: Italy; Germany; United Kingdom
- Languages: Italian; English
- Box office: $12,100

Padre Pio is a 2022 biographical drama film co-written and directed by Abel Ferrara. It stars Shia LaBeouf as the titular role of Padre Pio, a Capuchin Franciscan priest who receives the stigmata, in the background of the World War I in Italy. The film is a co-production of Italy, Germany and the United Kingdom.

During its production, LaBeouf converted to Catholicism as result of his spiritual experiences in character as Pio, who is venerated as a saint by the Catholic Church.

The film had its world premiere in the Giornate degli Autori section of the 79th Venice International Film Festival on 2 September 2022. It was released theatrically in the United Kingdom on 26 January 2024 by Dazzler Media and in Italy on 18 July 2024 by RS Productions.

== Plot ==
It is the year 1920. Italian WWI veterans have returned to their impoverished villages. Padre Pio arrives at San Giovanni Rotondo after living with his family in Pietrelcina for a number of years. While still sick, he continues to encounter Satan. Satan reveals himself as the instigator of the war and the sociopolitical problems of San Giovanni. While having little contact with the people of this town, Padre Pio learns what the poor are suffering from in the Sacrament of Confession and the Holy Mass, such as when a crippled man walks again because of Padre Pio's prayer. Besides the effects of war, such as medical inadequacy, health conditions and labourers dying from the effects of mustard gas, the people suffer from corrupt, wealthy landowners. Gerardo, a militaristic anti-socialist, threatens to kill any communal labourers tending his land. Many of them join the socialist party as a way to improve their lives. However, after they win the first free election in San Giovanni, Gerardo's forces massacre many of them. Padre Pio asks God that he may become a suffering servant for their salvation. He receives the wounds of Jesus Christ. The stigmata disrupts Satan's influence on San Giovanni Rotondo.

== Cast ==
- Shia LaBeouf as Padre Pio
- Marco Leonardi as Gerardo
- Salvatore Ruocco as Vincenzo
- Cristina Chiriac as Giovanna
- Brando Pacitto as Renato
- Luca Lionello as Silvestro
- Asia Argento as Tall Man

== Production ==
According to Abel Ferrara, actor Willem Dafoe suggested that Shia LaBeouf should be cast for the film's leading role. After Ferrara held several Zoom calls with LaBeouf, the latter agreed to join the film, even though very little money was raised (the film was almost never made) and LaBeouf did the project for free.

LaBeouf arrived at Old Mission Santa Inés in July 2021 to learn about Padre Pio with the Capuchin Franciscan friars. Thanks to Father Bobby Barbato and Brother Jude Quinto, Br. Alexander Rodriguez met LaBeouf while he attended Mass every day. He learned about the Catholic Church and the Capuchins while living in his truck or spending a few nights in the Capuchin's guest room. He was immersing himself in the Catholic faith. He enrolled in RCIA, revised the script with Rodriguez and trained to do the Latin Mass. Rodriguez traveled with LaBeouf as his spiritual adviser and catechist and was in the film as Padre Pio's companion.

Filming occurred in Apulia, Italy, in December 2021. The first place was at the Capuchin friary in San Marco la Catola. Padre Pio exchanged letters with his provincial and spiritual director while living in Pietrelcina with his family. The time was around 1909–1916. Both directors were living in San Marco during these years. Padre Pio expressed in his letters his deep and mysterious relationship with God and health difficulties. This event is in the film. While filming, LaBeouf slept in Padre Pio's bedroom.

After San Marco, filming continued outside the Sanctuary of Saint Michael the Archangel in Monte Sant'Angelo. Traditionally, St. Michael appeared here in the late 400s. LaBeouf stayed and filmed for a few weeks at the Abbey of Saint Mary of Pulsano. It is near the sanctuary. The rest of the filming took place outside the sanctuary.

Ferrara said in 2024 that he used AI for the Italian dub of this film.

== Release ==
Padre Pio had its world premiere in the Giornate degli Autori section of the 79th Venice International Film Festival on 2 September 2022. It received a four-minute ovation. It also competed at the Rio de Janeiro International Film Festival. At the Lisbon & Estoril Film Festival, it was chosen to compete for the "Best Film Award." During its North American premiere at the Mammoth Film Festival, it won the "Achievement for Filmmaking" award for cinematography. At the Taormina Film Festival, it premiered worldwide in Italian.

In March 2023, Gravitas Ventures acquired North American rights to the film. It was released in select theaters and on video on demand in the United States on 2 June 2023. The film was released in the United Kingdom and Ireland on 26 January 2024 by Dazzler Media. RS Productions released it in Italy on 18 July 2024.

== Reception ==
On the review aggregator website Rotten Tomatoes, the film holds an approval rating of 30% based on 43 reviews, with an average rating of 4.5/10. The website's critics consensus reads, "Tonally unbalanced and burdened with a distracting Shia LaBeouf performance, Padre Pio is one of Abel Ferrara's less divine works." Metacritic, which uses a weighted average, assigned the film a score of 45 out of 100, based on 6 critics, indicating "mixed or average" reviews..

Jordan Mintzer of The Hollywood Reporter gave the film a negative review, describing it as "clunky" and criticizing its political themes for possessing "the subtlety of a cartoon for preschoolers." Brian Tallerico of RogerEbert.com gave the film one and a half stars out of four, describing it as a "dull slog". Journalist Glenn Kenny of The New York Times found the film "occasionally rank" and panned LaBeouf's performance, though complimented Ferrara's "sometimes Brechtian consideration of the nodes of political history and spirituality." Film critic Armond White of National Review also criticized the film, describing it as "a work of deluded, semi-improvisational navel-gazing".

Film critic Peter Bradshaw of The Guardian gave the film a positive review, with three out of five stars, writing that it is "a weird film...with an undeveloped, improvised feel, like a fragment or shard of something else. Yet there is a background hum there...an awareness of something dark and malign. It is a minor film but interesting." Writing for The New Yorker, Richard Brody considered that "in its hectic, scattershot way, Padre Pio feels very much of the desperate present day," describing it as "a historical drama without historical distance" and "a wild effort to reach the immediate experience of the past and its furies."

Faith-based reviews for the film were generally negative. It received negative reviews from Catholic Answers, The Catholic World Report, The Catholic Weekly, The Catholic Thing, and Crisis Magazine. Conversely, it received a mixed review from The Catholic Review, as well as a positive review from America. Criticisms were generally aimed at the film's sexual content and perceived support of left-wing politics.

== See also ==
- Padre Pio: Miracle Man (2000)
- Padre Pio: Between Heaven and Earth (2000)
