= Frankie Thorn =

American actress

- Occupation: Actress

Frankie Thorn is an American actress best known for her role as "The Nun" opposite Harvey Keitel in Abel Ferrara's controversial 1992 film Bad Lieutenant.

== Filmography ==
Year	Title	Role
1989	Lisa	Judy
1990	The Flash (television)	Judith, 1 episode
1991	Liquid Dreams	Paula
1991	Babe Ruth (television)	Lady in hotel
1992	Bad Lieutenant	The Nun
1994	Viper	Rhonda
1995	Taken Alive	Angela Howard
1997	Doublecross on Costa's Island	Angela Howard
1998	Mike Hammer, Private Eye (television)	Narcissa, 1 episode
1998	Vengeance Unlimited (television)	
1999	Stigmata	Donna's customer
2000	Warm Texas Rain	Lisa
2000	Welcome to Hollywood	Girlfriend at audition #6
2007	He Was a Quiet Man	Jessica Light
