= Bitter Jester =

- The movie cover for Bitter Jester.
- Directed by: Maija DiGiorgio
- Written by: Maija DiGiorgio; D.B. Levin
- Produced by: Kenneth Simmons
- Starring: Maija DiGiorgio; Jody Delgiorno
- Music by: Joe Delia
- Release date: February 28, 2003
- Country: United States
- Language: English

Bitter Jester is a documentary film starring Maija DiGiorgio, Kenny Simmons, Jody Del Giorno, and Heather McConnell. The film includes interviews with comedians Richard Pryor and Richard Belzer, among others.

== Synopsis ==
Maija DiGiorgio is a naive New York comic whose therapist recommends a video diary as a means of examining herself. Maija's ex-boxer boyfriend, Kenny Simmons, and director of photography, Jody Del Giorno see a means to instant stardom.

Maija is searching for answers to the meaning of life and art as well as the answers for art and artifice. She allows Kenny to impose his "vision" onto her film. Before long, the three (along with a crew of misfits) are crisscrossing the country, interviewing celebrities under a parade of false pretenses. In one famous incident, Kenny makes the cover of The New York Post after a confrontation with Jerry Seinfeld.

== Critical reception ==
Dennis Harris of Variety said, "making a movie without really knowing what it's going to be about is not generally advisable, but Maija Di Giorgio's Bitter Jester makes that process quite entertaining." Harris hailed Jester as "often hilarious and always diverting" and noted "Di Giorgio may fret that 'Maybe comedy isn't the thing I should be pursuing.' Regardless, she definitely has a future as a filmmaker."

Steve Rhodes of the Online Film Critics Society praised, "Bitter Jester is much funnier and more insightful than a similar documentary, Comedian", while MetroActiv described it as "Intense, disturbing, and voyeuristic, the documentary about stand up that's not afraid to jump right into the muck." Bitter Jester had a director's cut, titled Hollywood Outlaw Movie.*

== Celebrity appearances ==
- Joy Behar
- Richard Belzer
- Peter Boyle
- George Carlin
- Chevy Chase
- Norm Crosby
- Phyllis Diller
- Whoopi Goldberg
- Gilbert Gottfried
- D.L. Hughley
- Dom Irrera
- Kevin James
- Terry Jones
- Richard Kind
- Kathy Kinney
- Robert Klein
- Barry Manilow
- Colin Mochrie
- Paul Mooney
- Richard Pryor
- Colin Quinn
- Tony Roberts
- Ray Romano
- Rita Rudner
- Vincent Schiavelli
- George Schlatter
- Paul Shaffer
- Ryan Stiles
- Jerry Stiller
- Nicole Sullivan
- Judy Tenuta
- Rich Vos
