= Tommaso (2019 film) =

2019 film by Abel Ferrara

- Italian film poster
- Directed by: Abel Ferrara
- Written by: Abel Ferrara
- Produced by: Simone Gattoni; Michael Weber; Christos V. Konstantakopoulos; Laura Buffoni
- Starring: Willem Dafoe
- Cinematography: Peter Zeitlinger
- Edited by: Fabio Nunziata
- Music by: Joe Delia
- Production companies: Faliro House Productions; Washington Square Films; Simil(ar); Vivo Film; The Match Factory
- Distributed by: Kino Lorber (United States)
- Release dates: 20 May 2019 (Cannes); 5 June 2020 (United States)
- Running time: 115 minutes
- Countries: Italy; United States; Greece
- Languages: English; Italian
- Box office: $27,136

Tommaso is a 2019 semi-autobiographical drama film written and directed by Abel Ferrara. Starring Willem Dafoe, Cristina Chiriac (Ferrara's wife) and Anna Ferrara (Ferrara's daughter), it is a semi-fictional account of the director's own life as an American artist residing in Rome.

The film had its world premiere in the Special Screenings section of the 2019 Cannes Film Festival on 20 May. It was digitally released in the United States on 5 June 2020 by Kino Lorber.

== Plot ==
The story follows an American artist living in Rome with his young European wife and their three-year-old daughter.

== Cast ==
- Willem Dafoe as Tommaso
- Cristina Chiriac as Nikki
- Anna Ferrara as Deedee

== Release ==
The film had its world premiere at the 72nd Cannes Film Festival in the Special Screenings section on 20 May 2019. In January 2020, Kino Lorber acquired U.S. distribution rights to the film. It was released in the United States on 5 June 2020.

== Reception ==
=== Box office ===
Due to the ongoing COVID-19 pandemic and Kino Lorber virtual cinema strategies, the film made $27,136 worldwide.

=== Critical response ===
The film holds an 80% approval rating on review aggregator Rotten Tomatoes, based on 74 reviews, with an average of 6.9/10. The website's critical consensus reads: "While admittedly a self-indulgent exercise, Tommaso is powerfully anchored by an outstanding central performance from Willem Dafoe." On Metacritic, it holds a rating of 66 out of 100, based on 19 critics, indicating "generally favorable reviews".
