= The Projectionist (2019 documentary film) =

- Directed by: Abel Ferrara
- Produced by: Christos V. Konstantakopoulos; Michael M. Bilandic; Joshua Blum; Bennett Elliott; Katie Stern; Michael Weber
- Starring: Nicolas Nicolaou; Abel Ferrara
- Cinematography: Ken Kelsch
- Edited by: Fabio Nunziata
- Music by: Joe Delia
- Release date: 2019 (Tribeca)
- Running time: 84 minutes
- Countries: United States; Greece
- Language: English

The Projectionist is a 2019 Greek-American documentary film about Nicolas Nicolaou, a Greek-American New York-based movie theater proprietor. The documentary was directed by Abel Ferrara.

== Participants ==
- Nicolas Nicolaou
- Abel Ferrara

== Reception ==
The film has a 92% rating on Rotten Tomatoes based on 13 reviews. Sam C. Mac of Slant Magazine awarded the film three stars out of four. Charles Bramesco of The Guardian awarded the film three stars out of five.

Brian Tallerico of RogerEbert.com gave the film a positive review and wrote, "I was worried that The Projectionist would be another dirge about the end of an era, but it's Ferrara's light touch and likable subject that make it so much more."

Todd McCarthy of The Hollywood Reporter also gave the film a positive review, calling it "A warm and inspiring immigrant story."

Wendy Ide of Screen International also gave the film a positive review and wrote, "Still, the film does convey respect and regard for Nicolaou and makes a strong case that he, and people like him, are more in tune with the soul of the city than the big businesses could ever be"
