= China Girl (1987 film) =

1987 film directed by Abel Ferrara

- Theatrical release poster
- Directed by: Abel Ferrara
- Written by: Nicholas St. John
- Produced by: Michael Nozik
- Starring: James Russo; David Caruso; Sari Chang; Richard Panebianco
- Cinematography: Bojan Bazelli
- Edited by: Anthony Redman
- Music by: Joe Delia
- Production company: Vestron Pictures
- Distributed by: Vestron Pictures
- Release date: September 25, 1987
- Running time: 89 minutes
- Country: United States
- Language: English
- Budget: $3.5 million
- Box office: $1,262,091 (USA)

China Girl is a 1987 American romantic crime drama film directed by Abel Ferrara from a screenplay by Nicholas St. John, and starring Richard Panebianco, Sari Chang, James Russo, Russell Wong, and David Caruso. The story is a contemporary take on the classic tale of Romeo and Juliet, with the star-crossed lovers portrayed as teenaged members of Italian and Chinese street gangs.

The film was released by Vestron Pictures on September 25, 1987. It received positive reviews from critics, and was nominated for the Critics Award at the 1987 Deauville American Film Festival.

== Plot ==
The plot revolves around the intimate relationship developing between Tony, a teenage boy from Little Italy, and Tye, a teenage girl from Chinatown, while both of their older brothers become engrossed in a heated gang war against each other.

== Cast ==
- Richard Panebianco as Tony
- Sari Chang as Tye
- James Russo as Alby
- Russell Wong as Yung Gan
- David Caruso as Mercury
- Joey Chin as Tsu Shin
- Judith Malina as Mrs. Monte
- James Hong as Gung Tu
- Robert Miano as Enrico Perito
- Paul Hipp as Nino
- Doreen Chan as Gau Shing
- Randy Sabusawa as Ma Fan "Cyclops"
- Keenan Leung as Ying
- Lum Chang Pan as Da Shan
- Sammy Lee as Mohawk
- Johnny Shia as Jimmy Bing
- Stephan Chen as Mr. Tang
- Raymond Moy as Tommy Chan
- Robert LaSardo as Carlo Forza
- Charles and Catherine Scorsese as Elderly couple at bar

== Production ==
The film bears some similarities to the Broadway musical West Side Story, which similarly is an adaptation of Romeo and Juliet set among rival ethnic gangs in Manhattan, and also features a male protagonist named Tony.

Filming took place entirely on-location in New York City.

== Release ==
The film was released theatrically on September 25, 1987 in 193 theaters and grossed $531,362 its opening weekend. the film grossed a domestic total of $1,262,091.

After its theatrical run, the film was released on videocassette by Vestron Video. Although a Region 2 DVD has been released, a Region 1 DVD has yet to be released, although it is currently available for digital download and streaming on Tubi in the United States. It was released on Blu-Ray in France in 2009.

== Reception ==
=== Box office ===
The film grossed $531,362 its opening weekend. Its grossed a domestic total of $1,262,091 and its widest release was to 193 theaters.

=== Critical response ===
The staff at Variety magazine said of the film, "China Girl is a masterfully directed, uncompromising drama and romance centering on gang rumbles (imaginary) between the neighboring Chinatown and Little Italy communities in New York City" and they especially praised the performances of Russell Wong and Joey Chin saying "Russell Wong (as handsome as a shirt ad model) and sidekick Joey Chin dominate their scenes as the young Chinese gang leaders."

Time Out magazine wrote that the film is a "superior exploitation picture – tough, stylish but often painfully misjudged reworking of Romeo and Juliet, with rival teenage gangs battling it out, sparked by the inter racial love affair between an Italian (Panebianco) and a Chinese girl (Chang), Ferrara makes excellent use of the Chinatown and Little Italy locations, and delivers the choreographed violence with his usual muscular panache" and that "The major strength of the script is its accommodation of three generations: the elders and their aspiring sons are seen to conspire against the warring youngsters, putting money before family."

Jonathan Rosenbaum of the Chicago Reader praised the film's photography and action scenes, writing "Bojan Bazelli's location photography is luminous and exciting, and the battle lines charted in Nicholas St. John's script are fairly complex."

=== Awards and nominations ===
Ferrara was nominated for the Critics Award at the 1987 Deauville American Film Festival.
