= Welcome to New York (2014 film) =

2014 film by Abel Ferrara

- French release poster
- Directed by: Abel Ferrara
- Written by: Abel Ferrara; Chris Zois
- Produced by: Adam Folk
- Starring: Gérard Depardieu; Jacqueline Bisset
- Cinematography: Ken Kelsch
- Edited by: Anthony Redman
- Production company: Wild Bunch
- Distributed by: Wild Bunch Distribution (France); IFC Films (United States)
- Release date: 17 May 2014 (Cannes)
- Running time: 125 minutes
- Countries: France; United States
- Languages: English; French

Welcome to New York is a 2014 crime drama film co-written and directed by Abel Ferrara. Inspired by the Dominique Strauss-Kahn affair when the French politician was accused of sexually assaulting a hotel maid, the film was released on 17 May 2014 by VOD on the Internet as the film failed to secure a place on the Official Selection at the 2014 Cannes Film Festival (where it was given a special market screening), nor was it picked up for theatrical distribution in France.

According to Vincent Maraval, one of the producers, the film faced a boycott by the French media.

== Synopsis ==
The film tells the story of a powerful man, a possible candidate for the Presidency of France, who lives a life of debauchery and is arrested after being accused of raping a maid at his hotel.

== Cast ==
- Gérard Depardieu as George Devereaux
- Jacqueline Bisset as Simone Devereaux
- Marie Mouté as Sophie Devereaux
- Drena De Niro as Executive Assistant
- Amy Ferguson as Renee
- Paul Calderón as Pierre
- Ronald Guttman as Roullot
- Paul Hipp as Guy
- Anna Lakomy as Anna
- Natasha Romanova as Russian Yelena
- Aurelie Claudel as Air France VIP Escort
- John Patrick Barry as Port Authority Chief
- Anh Duong as Livia
- Kathryn Lillecrapp as Bebe
- Jim Heaphy as Detective Fitzgerald

== Reception and lawsuit ==
On the review aggregator website Rotten Tomatoes, the film holds an approval rating of 77% based on 56 reviews. The website's critical consensus reads, "Led by a fearless performance from Gerard Depardieu, Welcome to New York is director Abel Ferrara at his most repulsive -- and most compulsively watchable."

Following its release – to mixed reviews varying from high praise to outright disgust – Strauss-Kahn said he would sue for slander. His lawyer also complained that the film's portrayal of Strauss-Kahn's then-wife, Anne Sinclair, was anti-Semitic. The film suggests Mrs. Deveraux's family profited from World War II. In fact, Sinclair's real family were French Jews who fled the country and had their property confiscated when Germany invaded. Sinclair echoed the criticism, but declined to press charges.

Ferrara, in a series of interviews with Indiewire, The Hollywood Reporter and other publications between September 2014 and March 2015, claimed that his distributor, Vincent Maraval of Wild Bunch, sold an unauthorized R-rated version of the film to IFC Films, for distribution in the US; the R-rated cut had already been released on Blu-ray and VOD in various European countries. Maraval subsequently responded that Ferrara had agreed on the R-rated cut to receive more financing for the film and had also contractually consented to lose final cut of the R-rated version if he did not deliver one by a certain date. Ferrara then stated his intent to send a cease-and-desist letter to Maraval and IFC, which issued its own statement also claiming that it had given Ferrara the chance to deliver his own R-rated cut for theatrical showings in the US, which he declined to do. As of March 27, the R-rated cut has only been shown at one American theater – the Roxie in San Francisco – though it is available in the US on VOD, and IFC has stated it intends to show it at additional theaters.
