= Victor Argo =

American actor (1934–2004)

- Born: Victor Jiménez; November 5, 1934; New York City, New York, U.S.
- Died: April 7, 2004 (aged 69); New York City, New York, U.S.
- Occupations: Actor; singer
- Years active: 1964–2004

Victor Argo (born Victor Jiménez; November 5, 1934 – April 7, 2004) was an American actor and musician. Known for his "jowly, lived-in face and a deep voice that suggested danger ahead," he was a regular in the films of directors Martin Scorsese and Abel Ferrara, often playing tough or intimidating characters.

== Early life ==
Argo was born Victor Jiménez in The Bronx, New York to Puerto Rican parents from Quebradillas. Prior to his acting career, he worked variously as a jewelry seller, a printer and a taxi driver.

Attempting to break into show business at a time when there was much prejudice against Latino performers, he professionally adopted the surname "Argo" to better his casting chances, stating in an interview that he "felt the prejudice was against the name, not even against me."

== Career ==
=== Stage ===
Argo began his acting career on-stage. While performing in an Off-Broadway play during the 1960s, Argo met Yoko Ono, with whom he participated in the Happening movement. He met Harvey Keitel during the early stages of his career; the two actors remained close friends for nearly forty years and worked together on several films, including Bad Lieutenant which Argo helped persuade Keitel to accept the lead role for. In 1977, Argo became a founding member of the Riverside Shakespeare Company on New York City's Upper West Side. As a member, he toured the parks of Manhattan playing Lord Montague.

Shortly before his death, Argo realized a lifelong dream of performing on Broadway when he was cast as Santiago, the owner of a cigar factory, in the Pulitzer Prize-winning drama Anna in the Tropics.

=== Screen ===
Argo lent his talents to nearly 70 theatrical films and 40 television films and series.

Argo made his film debut in February of 1972 in Dealing: Or the Berkeley-to-Boston Forty-Brick Lost-Bag Blues. Argo appeared later that same year in June in Boxcar Bertha, directed by Martin Scorsese, as a railroad detective. Also that year, he had a small role in Unholy Rollers (November 1972). Often playing the part of the New York City 'heavy' or mobster on film, Argo was a favorite of such directors as Scorsese, Abel Ferrara and Woody Allen.

His film credits include Taxi Driver (1976), King of New York (1990), The Rose (1979), New York Stories (1989), The Last Temptation of Christ (1988), Bad Lieutenant (1992), True Romance (1993), and Coyote Ugly (2000). He played the father of Jennifer Lopez's character in the 2001 romantic drama Angel Eyes.

On television in February of 1973 Argo appeared on The Waltons, followed by All in the Family in September that same year, and Kojak afterwards. In 1974, he appeared in the made-for-TV film Smile Jenny, You're Dead. Also in the 1970s, Argo's television guest appearances include Starsky & Hutch (1975), The Rockford Files and Wonder Woman both in 1977, and Buck Rogers in the 25th Century (1979)

In 1985, Argo appeared on The Equalizer episode "The Defector" as O'Hare, who poses as a police officer and puts Melissa Leo's character, Russian ballerina Irina Dzershinsky, into "protective" custody by order of the KGB. Other appearances in the 1980s include, Spenser: For Hire (1985), Miami Vice (1988), and episodes of Law & Order (1992, 1997) and Law & Order: Criminal Intent (2003). In one of his final roles, Argo played Chuck Manetta, a tough-talking soccer grandpa, in the independent feature, Personal Sergeant, released in 2004.

In his last screen role, in the independent film Lustre by director Art Jones, Argo portrayed a New York City loan shark who retreats from his everyday, hard-nosed rants to a deeply spiritual retreat from the world. The film was released in 2005. In a review, Jeannette Catsoulis at The New York Times writes that Argo's "fireplug body and throaty growl -- emanating from a face resembling a rather sad bulldog -- added texture and memorability to characters who might easily have disappeared in a fog of stereotype."

=== Music ===
Outside of acting on the screen and stage, another deep passion for Argo was country music, the actor at one time having traveled to Nashville to cut several song demos.

== Death ==
Argo died in New York City at Saint Vincent's Catholic Medical Center on April 7, 2004, from complications of lung cancer at age 69. His body was donated to Manhattan College for medical science. In 2005, Electronic music group Bodega System released a 12" vinyl LP which includes the track "Victor Argo".

== Filmography ==
=== Film ===
Theatrical films in which Argo had a role follow.

- Dealing (1972) as 2nd Cuban
- Boxcar Bertha (1972) as McIver #1
- Unholy Rollers (1972) as Vinnie The Trainer
- Mean Streets (1973) as Mario
- The Don Is Dead (1973) as Augie 'The Horse'
- The Terminal Man (1974) as Orderly
- Taxi Driver (1976) as Melio, Bodega Clerk
- Hot Tomorrows (1977) as Tony
- Which Way Is Up? (1977) as Angel
- The Rose (1979) as Lockerman
- Hanky Panky (1982) as Pallbearer
- Romando (1982) as Don Piri
- Falling in Love (1984) as Victor Rawlins
- The Electric Chair (1985) as Comic
- Desperately Seeking Susan (1985) as Sergeant Taskal
- After Hours (1985) as Diner Cashier
- Off Beat (1986) as Leon
- Raw Deal (1986) as Dangerous Man
- The Pick-up Artist (1987) as Harris
- The Last Temptation of Christ (1988) as Peter, Apostle
- Her Alibi (1989) as Avram
- New York Stories (1989) as Cop (segment "Life Lessons")
- Crimes and Misdemeanors (1989) as Detective
- King of New York (1990) as Lieutenant Roy Bishop
- Quick Change (1990) as Mike Skelton
- McBain (1991) as El Presidente
- Shadows and Fog (1991) as Hacker's Vigilante #2
- Bad Lieutenant (1992) as Beat Cop
- True Romance (1993) as Lenny
- Dangerous Game (1993) as Director of Photography
- Household Saints (1993) as Lino Falconetti
- Men Lie (1994) as Scott's Dad
- Monkey Trouble (1994) as Charlie
- Somebody to Love (1994) as Santa Claus
- Smoke (1995) as Vinnie
- Blue in the Face (1995) as Vinnie
- Condition Red (1995) as Victor Klein
- The Funeral (1996) as Julius
- Next Stop Wonderland (1998) as Frank
- Going Nomad (1998) as Spiro
- Lulu on the Bridge (1998) as Pierre
- Side Streets (1998) as Albani Krug
- New Rose Hotel (1998) as Portuguese Business Man
- Fast Horses (1998) as Zack
- On the Run (1999) as Man Shaving
- Coming Soon (1999) as Mr. Neipris
- Ghost Dog: The Way of the Samurai (1999) as Vinny
- Blue Moon (2000) as Tony
- The Yards (2000) as Paul Lazarides
- Fast Food Fast Women (2000) as Seymour
- Love = (Me)^3 (2000) as Mr. Carrera
- Coyote Ugly (2000) as Pete
- Double Whammy (2001) as Lieutenant Spigot
- 'R Xmas (2001) as Louie
- Angel Eyes (2001) as Carl Pogue
- Queenie in Love (2001) as Horace
- The Man Who Knew Belle Starr (2001) as Diner Owner
- Don't Say a Word (2001) as Syd Simon
- Bridget (2002) as Grant
- Anything But Love (2002) as Sal
- Dirt (2003) as El Gringo Nestor
- Personal Sergeant (2004, filmed in 2003) as Chuck Manetta
- Lustre (2005, filmed in 2003) as Hugo (final film role)

=== Television ===
Victor Argo television credits
Year	Title	Role	Notes	Ref.
1973	The Waltons	Zvelei	Episode: "The Gypsies" (S1.E19)	
1973	All in the Family	Mr. Estrada	Episode: "We're Having a Heat Wave" (S4.E1)	
1974	Smile Jenny, You're Dead	Sgt. Richard Marum	TV movie	
1974	Kojak	Joseph Crespi	Episode: "The Chinatown Murders"	
1975	Force Five	Frankie Hatcher	TV movie	
1975	Starsky & Hutch	Rudy Solenko	Episode: "Lady Blue" (S1.E11)	
1977	Wonder Woman	Jason	Episode: "Last of the Two Dollar Bills" (S1.E9)	
1977	The Rockford Files	Jud Brown	1 episode	
1979	Buck Rogers in the 25th Century	Raphael Argus	2 episodes	
1981	Dream House	Ramirez	TV movie	
1985	Spenser: For Hire	Hitman	1 episode	
1985	The Equalizer	O'Hare	Episode: "The Defector" (S1.E3)	
1986	Florida Straits	Pablo Cheruka	TV movie	
1988	Miami Vice	Commandante Salazar	2 episodes	
1990	Johnny Ryan	Frank Costello	TV movie	
1990	Vendetta: Secrets of the Mafia	Persico	TV miniseries	
1992	Law & Order	Jose Tirado	Episode: "Cradel to Grave" (S2.E18)	
1995	Dark Eyes	Rray Cedeno	1 episode	
1996	Sins of Silence	Nick DiMatteo	TV movie	
1997	Law & Order	Enrique Flores	Episode: "Barter" (S7.E12)	
2003	Law & Order: Criminal Intent	Mr. Garcia	Episode: "See Me" (S2.E13)	

== See also ==
- List of Puerto Ricans
