= Turn in the Wound =

2024 documentary film by Abel Ferrara

- Directed by: Abel Ferrara
- Produced by: Diana Phillips; Philipp Kreuzer; Maurizio Antonini; Grear Patterson
- Starring: Volodymyr Zelenskyy
- Narrated by: Patti Smith
- Cinematography: Sean Price Williams: Emmanuel Gras; Alessandro Abate
- Edited by: Leonardo Daniel Bianchi
- Music by: Patti Smith
- Production companies: Rimsky Productions; Maze Pictures; Interlinea Film; VENTANA Cinema
- Release date: 16 February 2024 (Berlinale)
- Running time: 77 minutes
- Countries: United Kingdom; Germany; Italy; United States
- Languages: Ukrainian; English

Turn in the Wound is a 2024 documentary film directed by Abel Ferrara. It follows through performances, poetry and music, the experience of people at war, focusing on life in Kyiv since the beginning of the Russian invasion of Ukraine.

The film had its world premiere in the Berlinale Special section of the 74th Berlin International Film Festival on 16 February 2024, where it was nominated for the Berlinale Documentary Award.

== Content ==
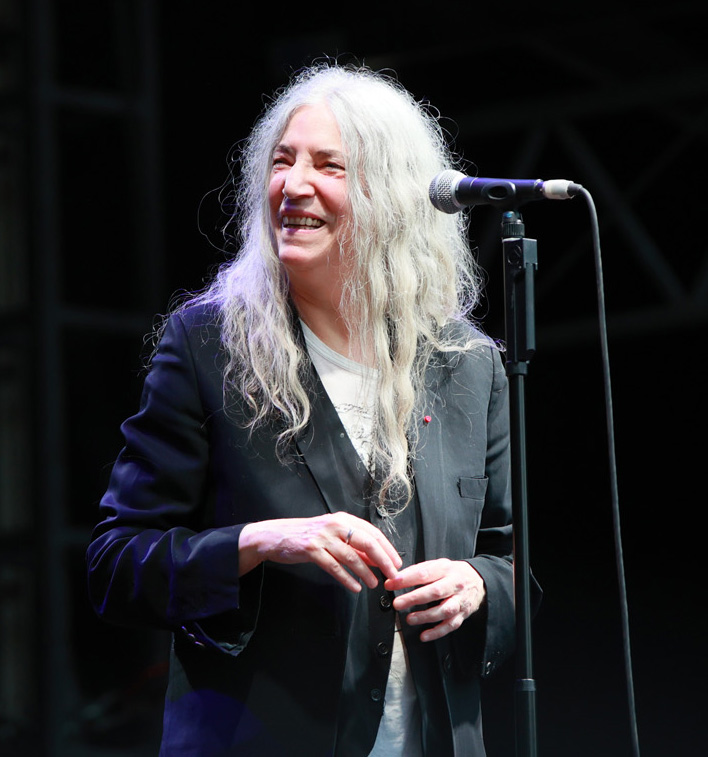
Patti Smith, in 2022

This film explores how art, music and poetry express the feelings of people who are caught in war. It examines how they cope with the endless pain and violence that remind them of their history, and how they pursue their dreams of liberation from tyranny and war. The film features Patti Smith's voice, reading poems by Antonin Artaud, René Daumal and Arthur Rimbaud, along with the testimonies of fighters and civilians in Ukraine's war zones and the words of its President Volodymyr Zelenskyy.

== Cast ==
- Volodymyr Zelenskyy
- Andriy Yermak
- Patti Smith

== Release ==
Turn in the Wound premiered on 16 February 2024, as part of the 74th Berlin International Film Festival, in Berlinale Special.

== Reception ==
Siddhant Adlakha writing in Variety said, "That Ferrara doesn’t shy away from capturing pitfalls suggests a larger and more overarching view of conflict — political and military; ethical and aesthetic — which Turn in the Wound attempts to fold into its purview." Adlakha continued, "It doesn’t always succeed, given the breadth of the topics at hand, but it does occasionally distill them into moments that prove either gut-churning or powerfully introspective."

Leslie Felperin reviewing the film for The Hollywood Reporter termed it as "A watchably odd entry in the Ukraine doc subgenre;" and opined, "I’m not sure what [Smith] and Ferrara have contributed with this film to the Ukrainian cause, but it’s watchable at least."

== Accolades ==
| Award | Date of ceremony | Category | Recipient | Result | Ref. |
|---|---|---|---|---|---|
| Berlin International Film Festival | 25 February 2024 | Berlinale Documentary Film Award | Turn in the Wound | Nominated | |
