= New Rose Hotel (film) =

1998 film by Abel Ferrara

- DVD cover
- Directed by: Abel Ferrara
- Screenplay by: Abel Ferrara; Chris Zois
- Based on: "New Rose Hotel" (1984 story) by William Gibson
- Produced by: Edward R. Pressman
- Starring: Christopher Walken; Willem Dafoe; Asia Argento; Yoshitaka Amano; Annabella Sciorra; John Lurie; Gretchen Mol; Ryuichi Sakamoto
- Cinematography: Ken Kelsch
- Edited by: Jim Mol; Anthony Redman
- Music by: Schoolly D
- Production companies: Edward R. Pressman Film Corp.; Quadra Entertainment
- Distributed by: Avalanche Releasing
- Release dates: September 9, 1998 (Venice); October 1, 1999 (U.S.)
- Running time: 93 minutes
- Country: United States
- Language: English
- Box office: $21,521

New Rose Hotel is a 1998 American science-fiction erotic thriller film co-written and directed by Abel Ferrara, based on William Gibson's 1984 cyberpunk short story. It stars Christopher Walken, Willem Dafoe, and Asia Argento.

The film premiered at the 55th Venice International Film Festival, where it was nominated for the Golden Lion.

== Plot ==
Fox and X are Tokyo-based freelance industrial spies who specialize in helping R&D scientists defect from corporations who would rather see them dead than working for competitors. Fox is obsessed with Dr. Hiroshi, a paradigm-shattering super-genius who works for Maas, the German corporation that crippled Fox. Japanese firm Hosaka hires Fox and X to help Hiroshi defect, offering a fee of $50 million. Fox and X hire Sandii, a nightclub singer and call girl in Shinjuku, to help persuade Hiroshi to defect to a newly outfitted Hosaka lab in Marrakesh.

While training her for the extraction, X falls in love with Sandii, who offers conflicting accounts of her past. Fox and X meet Hosaka representatives and negotiate their fee up to $100 million. Sandii meets Hiroshi in Vienna and persuades him to leave his wife and defect to Hosaka. Fox travels to Marrakesh to await Hiroshi, and X arranges to spend a night with Sandii in Berlin before her rendezvous in Marrakesh. Sandii proposes that she and X leave Fox and marry. X offers to discuss it after Sandii visits Marrakesh. That night, while Sandii sleeps, X rummages through her personal effects, finding cash, information about her aliases, and an unmarked computer chip.

Hosaka transfers the agreed-upon $100 million fee. Fox returns from Marrakesh, and X informs him that he will be meeting Sandii in Shinjuku to start a new life with her, a plan that Fox begrudgingly accepts. Later, Fox and X celebrate their success and newfound wealth with prostitutes. The next day, X's contact in Marrakesh informs him that Hosaka has relocated many top scientists to the new lab in Marrakesh, a move that Fox deems unsafe but potentially lucrative for him and X, despite X's insistence that he is finished with the case.

During the night, X's Marrakesh contact informs him that somebody secretly reprogrammed the lab's DNA synthesizer to spread a virus that killed everyone in the facility, including Hiroshi, and that Sandii has vanished. X discovers that the bank account holding the $100 million has been terminated. Fox deduces that Maas recruited Sandii in Vienna and ordered her to kill Hosaka's scientists in Marrakesh, and that Hosaka, presuming that Fox and X were complicit, has wiped their account and will send agents to kill them. After being surrounded by Hosaka agents in a department store, Fox leaps to his death. X flees to a shabby capsule hotel called the New Rose Hotel, where he reflects on his time with Fox and Sandii and views footage of a man removing the unmarked computer chip from the DNA synthesizer in Marrakesh. Knowing that Hosaka will hunt him wherever he goes, X contemplates suicide and masturbates to the memory of his last night with Sandii.

== Cast ==
- Christopher Walken as Fox
- Willem Dafoe as X
- Asia Argento as Sandii
- Annabella Sciorra as Madame Rosa
- John Lurie as Distinguished man
- Yoshitaka Amano as Hiroshi
- Gretchen Mol as Hiroshi's wife
- Ryuichi Sakamoto as Hosaka executive
- Victor Argo as Portuguese businessman
- Naoko "Kimmy" Suzuki as 1st Asian girl
- Miou as 2nd Asian girl
- Phil Neilson as Welshman
- Ken Kelsch as Expeditor

== Production ==
=== Writing and casting ===
Edward R. Pressman had owned the film rights to Gibson's short story since the late 1980s. Before Abel Ferrara became involved, Kathryn Bigelow was originally set to direct. Ferrara's regular collaborator Zoë Lund wrote the first draft of the script in 1996, though it went unused.

According to Ferrara, both Virginie Ledoyen and Chloë Sevigny were considered for the role of Sandii and Arnold Schwarzenegger was considered for the role of Fox.

=== Filming ===
Filming took place in Osaka and New York City.

Ferrara said that he fired many of the film's crew members, some of whom were long-time collaborators, such as composer Joe Delia.

== Release ==
The film premiered in-competition at the 55th Venice International Film Festival. It opened in the United States on October 1, 1999, at the Cinema Village Triplex in New York City.

=== Home media ===
Boutique label Vinegar Syndrome (via its sub-label Cinématographe) released the film on Blu-Ray in November 28, 2025.

== Reception ==
=== Box office ===
The film grossed $5,147 in its opening weekend and $21,521 in total.

=== Critical response ===
On the review aggregator website Rotten Tomatoes, the film holds an approval rating of 24% based on 17 reviews, with an average rating of 4.2/10. Metacritic, which uses a weighted average, assigned the film a score of 31 out of 100, based on 9 critics, indicating "generally unfavorable" reviews.

== Documentary ==
Asia Argento made a documentary about Ferrara, titled Abel/Asia (1998), during the making of the film.
