= 'R Xmas =

2001 film by Abel Ferrara

- DVD cover
- Directed by: Abel Ferrara
- Screenplay by: Abel Ferrara; Scott Pardo
- Story by: Cassandra De Jesus
- Produced by: Pierre Kalfon
- Starring: Drea de Matteo; Lillo Brancato; Ice-T; Victor Argo; Andrew Fiscella
- Cinematography: Ken Kelsch
- Edited by: Patricia Bowers; Bill Pankow; Suzanne Pillsbury
- Music by: Schooly D
- Production companies: Valence Films Inc. Barnholtz Entertainment; StudioCanal
- Distributed by: Pathfinder Pictures (U.S.); Mars Distribution (France)
- Release dates: May 9, 2001 (Cannes); December 26, 2001 (France); November 8, 2002 (U.S.)
- Running time: 85 minutes
- Countries: United States; France
- Language: English

'R Xmas is a 2001 crime film directed and co-written by Abel Ferrara and starring Drea de Matteo, Lillo Brancato, and Ice-T. The film is about an affluent married couple with a secret double life as drug dealers. When the husband is kidnapped on Christmas Eve, his wife must find enough money to pay his ransom.

This American and French co-production was filmed on-location in New York City. It was screened in the Un Certain Regard section at the 2001 Cannes Film Festival. It received a limited theatrical release in the United States, before being released on home video.

== Plot ==
An unnamed married couple outwardly lives as affluent socialites - sending their daughter to a private school, living in a high-rise with doormen - but earn their money commuting to a drab Flushing apartment where, with their relatives, they package and sell heroin. Before Christmas, one of the husband's regular associates asks him to hold a large quantity of heroin for him over the holiday.

On Christmas Eve, the husband takes an ostensibly routine meeting while the wife visits an illicit pawnshop hoping to obtain a popular sold-out "Party Girl" doll for their daughter. After buying the toy, she is accosted by a man in possession of her husband's driver's license. He informs her he has been kidnapped, and gives her 20 minutes to collect as much money as she can for ransom. After getting approximately $15,000 from her street dealers, she brings it to him, but he is dissatisfied with the low sum. Relaying his knowledge of personal information about them and their child, he demands she deliver more money and all the drugs they have on hand.

As she attempts to gather these during a time when clients and family are out of contact for the Christmas holiday, the husband is beaten by a gang whose manner of speaking suggests they are rogue police. When the wife returns, the liaison gets strangely familiar with her, asking personal questions about their marriage, and warns her to make sure he stops dealing. Come Christmas morning, the father is safely home, and their daughter happily receives her Party Girl doll.

TV coverage shortly after the incident reveals that a corrupt band of police have been arrested for activities including dealing drugs, and the wife recognizes one of the arrested officers as the man she dealt with. While they share concerns about what future troubles may arise from their business, they are not willing to give up their upscale lifestyle and ultimately continue. At a lavish party they attend, the husband is briefly diverted by some of his dealers, who reveal they have found and killed the associate who asked him to sit on the heroin, assuming that he had tipped off the cops who kidnapped him. He returns to the party and goes on stage to sing a ballad to his wife.

== Cast ==
- Drea de Matteo as the Wife
- Lillo Brancato, Jr. as the Husband
- Ice-T as the Kidnapper
- Lisa Valens as Lisa, the Daughter
- Victor Argo as Louie
- Denia Brache as Louie's Wife
- Gloria Irizarry as Aunt
- Naomi Morales as The Niece
- Nelson Vasquez as Niece's Husband
- Andrew Fiscella, Thomas Murray, and Edwin Martinez as Accomplices
- Janis Corsair and Anne Ackerman as Shoppers
- Meredith Ostrom as Elfie
- Luis Santos as Tio
- Begonya Plaza as Consuelo
- Orran Farmer as Sucio
- Jamal Simmons as Trey

== Production ==
Annabella Sciorra, John Leguizamo, and Forest Whitaker were originally attached to play the leads.

== Release ==
'R Xmas' U.S. release was delayed by StudioCanal's difficulty in finding a domestic distributor and internal financial troubles. It eventually received a small theatrical release in November 2002 from Pathfinder Pictures, before being released on DVD shortly after by Artisan Entertainment.

In 2022, the film was released on Blu-Ray by Shout! Factory.

== Reception ==
=== Critical response ===
On review aggregator website Rotten Tomatoes, 'R Xmas holds an approval rating of 62% based on 26 reviews.

Reviewing the film for The Village Voice, Amy Taubin wrote "[the film] is a vertiginous, anti-Sopranos riff on middle-class drug dealers in which not a single shot is fired. In a festival that didn’t stint on violence, Ferrara’s uncharacteristic restraint and understatement registered as a unique accomplishment."

Sean Axmaker of Stream on Demand called the film "prime Abel Ferrara territory: a New York tale rumbling with irony and ambiguity."

=== Awards and nominations ===
Institution	Year	Category	Nominee	Result
Cahiers du Cinéma	2001	Annual Top 10 List	Abel Ferrara	10th place
Cannes Film Festival	2001	Prix un certain regard	Abel Ferrara	Nominated
Chicago International Film Festival	2001	Gold Hugo	Abel Ferrara	Nominated
New York International Independent Film & Video Festival	2002	Grand Jury Prize	Abel Ferrara	Won
New York International Independent Film & Video Festival	2002	Best Actress	Drea de Matteo	Won
