= Zeros and Ones =

2021 film

- Theatrical release poster
- Directed by: Abel Ferrara
- Written by: Abel Ferrara
- Produced by: Diana Phillips; Philipp Kreuzer
- Starring: Ethan Hawke
- Cinematography: Sean Price Williams
- Edited by: Leonardo Daniel Bianchi; Stephen Gurewitz
- Music by: Joe Delia
- Production companies: Rimsky Productions; Maze Pictures; Hammerstone Studios; Macaia Film; Almost Never Films
- Distributed by: Lionsgate
- Release dates: August 12, 2021 (Locarno); November 19, 2021 (United States)
- Running time: 85 minutes
- Countries: United States; Italy
- Language: English

Zeros and Ones is a 2021 thriller film written and directed by Abel Ferrara. Starring Ethan Hawke, it follows an American mercenary attempting to uncover a plot to blow up the Vatican during the COVID-19 lockdowns in Rome.

The film had its world premiere in the main competition of the 74th Locarno Film Festival in August 12, 2021, where it won the Pardo for Best Direction. It received a limited theatrical release and a simultaneous digital release on the United States by Lionsgate on November 19, 2021.

== Cast ==
- Ethan Hawke as JJ/Justin
- Phil Neilson as Phil
- Valerio Mastandrea as Luciano
- Valeria Correale as Valeria
- Babak Karimi as Mullah
- Korlan Madi as Jiao
- Stephen Gurewitz as Stephen
- Mahmut Sifa Erkaya as Ari
- Salvatore Ruocco
- Zixuan Chen as Jiao's Son
- Sebastian Mendizabal as Mustapha

== Production ==
In November 2020, it was announced that Ethan Hawke, Cristina Chiriac, and Phil Nelson had joined the cast, with Abel Ferrara directing from his screenplay.

Principal photography began in November 2020 in Italy.

== Reception ==
On the review aggregator website Rotten Tomatoes, the film holds an approval rating of 54% based on 54 reviews, with an average rating of 5/10. The website's consensus reads, "Zeros and Ones is poorly lit and beset by narrative chaos, but Ethan Hawke's passionate performance is a solid fit for Abel Ferrara's intriguingly idiosyncratic storytelling." On Metacritic, the film has a weighted average score of 61 out of 100, based on 16 critics, indicating "generally favourable reviews".

=== Awards ===
- 2021 – 74th Locarno Film Festival: Pardo for Best Direction (Abel Ferrara).
