= Condition Red (film) =

1995 film

- Film poster
- Directed by: Mika Kaurismäki
- Written by: Andre Degas
- Produced by: Ken Schwenker
- Starring: James Russo; Cynda Williams; Paul Calderon
- Cinematography: Ken Kelsch
- Edited by: Mika Kaurismäki; Suzanne Pillsbury
- Music by: Mauri Sumén
- Production companies: Oak Island Films; Marianna Films
- Distributed by: Arrow Releasing (United States); United International Pictures (Finland)
- Release dates: 8 December 1995 (United States); 8 March 1996 (Finland)
- Running time: 83 minutes
- Countries: Finland; United States
- Language: English

Condition Red is a 1995 Finnish-American thriller film directed by Mika Kaurismäki. The premise is that a correctional officer falls in love with a female inmate who convinces him to help her escape. It was entered into the 19th Moscow International Film Festival.

== Cast ==
- James Russo as Dan Cappelli
- Cynda Williams as Gidell Ryan
- Paul Calderon as Angel Delgado
- Victor Argo as Victor Klein
- Jonathan Shaw as Tattooed Inmate
- Verrone Romeoletti as Malone
- Cedric Turner as Inmate
- Matthew Styles as Effeminate Inmate
- Richard Boes as Boyce
- Andre Degas as Bishop
- John Ashton as Deputy Warden
- Ana Ortiz as C Block Inmate
- Amanda Foster as Blondie
