= Drea de Matteo =

American actress (born 1972)

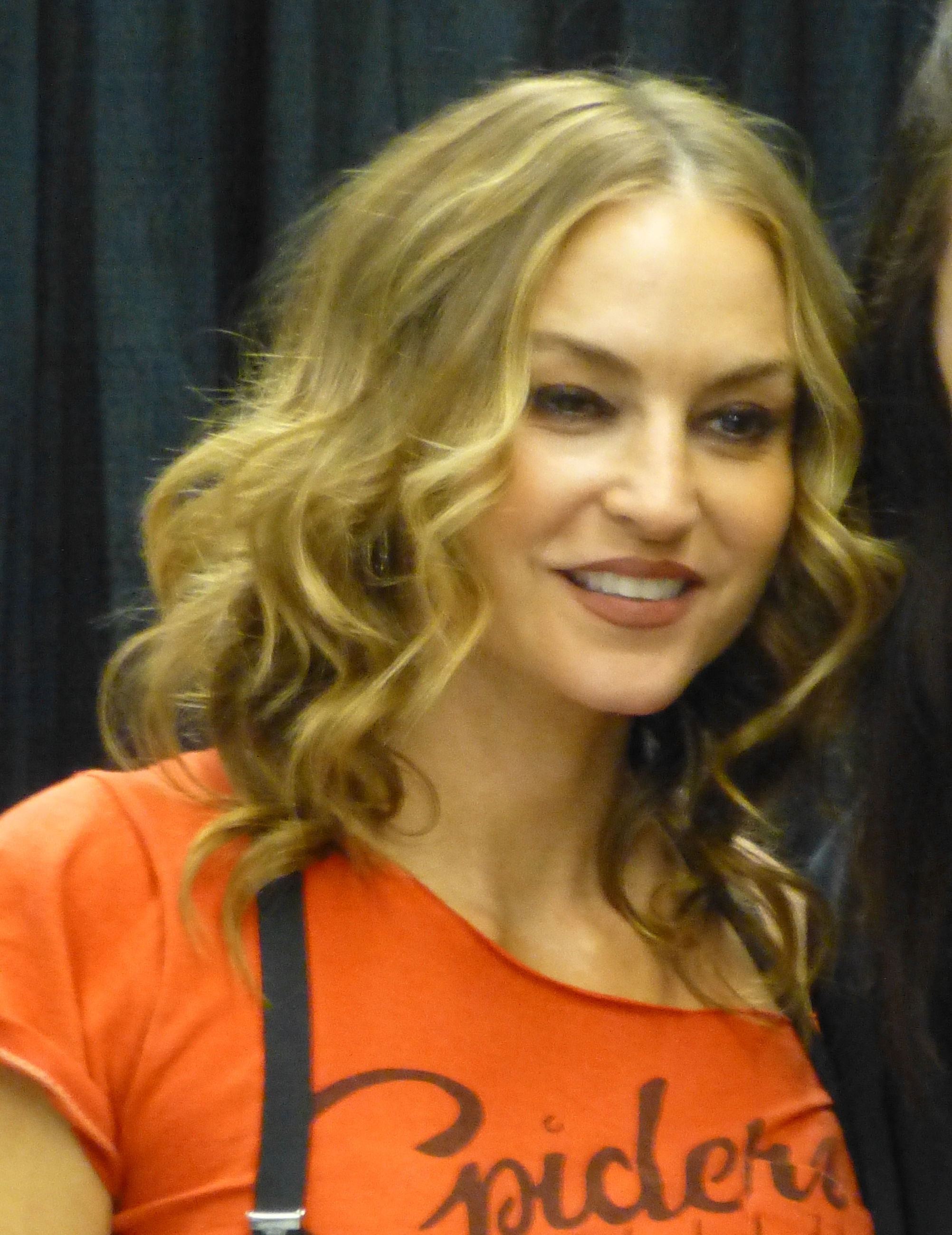
- De Matteo in 2015
- Born: Andrea Donna de Matteo; January 19, 1972 (age 54); New York City, U.S.
- Education: New York University (BFA)
- Occupation: Actress
- Years active: 1995–present
- Known for: The Sopranos
- Children: 2
- Awards: Primetime Emmy Award for Outstanding Supporting Actress in a Drama Series (The Sopranos, 2004)

Andrea Donna de Matteo (born January 19, 1972) is an American actress who is best known for her role as Adriana La Cerva on the television drama The Sopranos (1999–2006), for which she received the Primetime Emmy Award for Outstanding Supporting Actress in a Drama Series in 2004. Other notable roles include Gina Tribbiani on Joey (2004–2006), Wendy Case on Sons of Anarchy (2008–2014), Angie Bolen on Desperate Housewives (2009–2010), and Detective Tess Nazario on Shades of Blue (2016–2018).

== Early life and education ==
Andrea Donna de Matteo was born on January 19, 1972, in Queens, New York and raised in Malba, Queens. Her mother, Donna, is a playwright and playwriting teacher who has been on faculty at HB Studio, and her father, Albert, was a furniture manufacturer who was owner and CEO of Avery Boardman and Carlyle. She is of Italian descent, and grew up in a Catholic family.

After graduating from the Loyola School on the Upper East Side of Manhattan, De Matteo earned a Bachelor of Fine Arts in film production from the Tisch School of the Arts of New York University in Greenwich Village, intending to become a film director. She additionally studied acting at the HB Studio.

== Career ==
De Matteo's role in The Sopranos helped launch her career. She has appeared in several films, including Swordfish, Deuces Wild, The Perfect You, Prey for Rock & Roll and the 2005 remake of John Carpenter's 1976 action film Assault on Precinct 13. She had the starring role in Abel Ferrara's R Xmas, for which she received positive reviews.

In 2004, De Matteo won an Emmy for Best Supporting Actress (Drama) for her role as Adriana on The Sopranos (season 5) and was nominated for a Golden Globe the same year for the same role.

From 2004 to 2006, De Matteo portrayed Joey Tribbiani's sister Gina on Joey.

De Matteo played the role of Wendy Case in the series Sons of Anarchy. The pilot episode aired September 3, 2008, and De Matteo continued making regular appearances into the series' sixth season. She was promoted to a series regular for the seventh and final season.

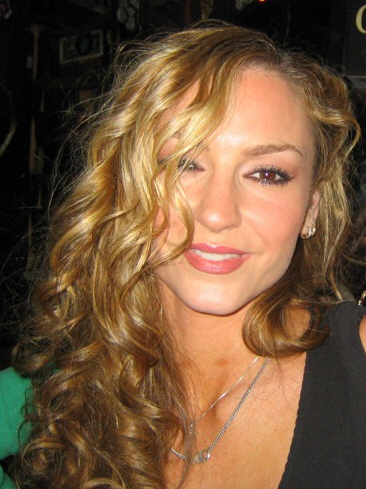
De Matteo in 2005

De Matteo played Angie Bolen, the mother of the Bolen family, on season 6 of the show Desperate Housewives. She left Desperate Housewives at the season 6 finale in 2010, for personal reasons.

In 2012, she guest-starred in Californication.

De Matteo played the stepmother of Steve Wilde, the main character of the FOX comedy Running Wilde, appearing in season 1, episode 9. De Matteo co-starred as Krissi Cates in the film adaptation of Dark Places (2015). In 2015, she was cast as Det. Tess Nazario in the NBC drama series Shades of Blue.

De Matteo and Chris Kushner began hosting a rewatch podcast of The Sopranos on March 13, 2020, called Made Women; in July, the podcast was retooled and renamed Gangster Goddess Broad-Cast.

In August 2023, De Matteo began posting photographs of herself on OnlyFans. She claimed her refusal to get the COVID-19 vaccine put her out of work and led her to join the website.

== Personal life ==
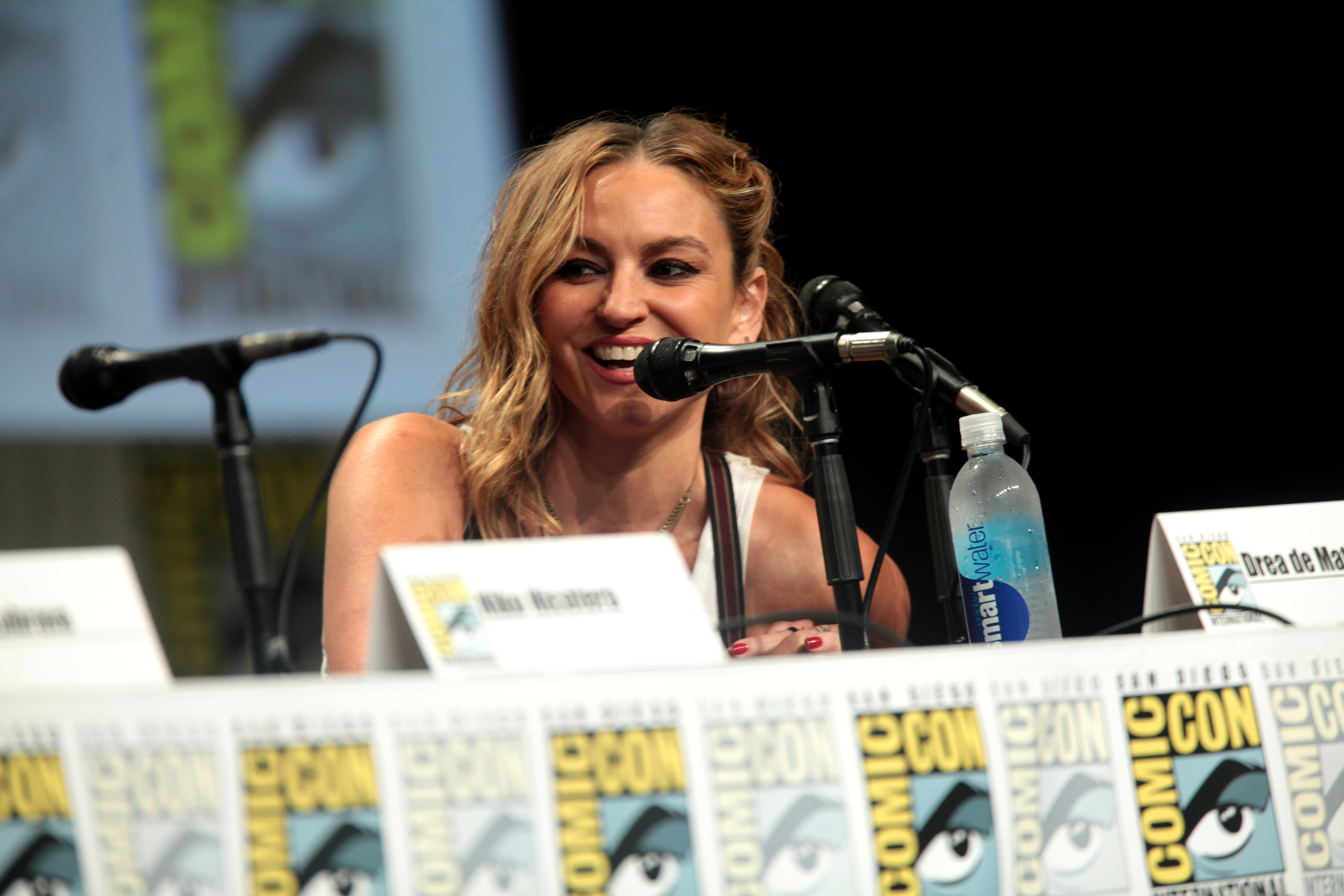
Matteo at the 2014 San Diego Comic-Con for Sons of Anarchy at the San Diego Convention Center in San Diego, California

In 1997, De Matteo opened Filth Mart, a clothing store with her boyfriend Michael Sportes. They closed the store in 2004.

De Matteo started dating musician Shooter Jennings in 2001. They became engaged on June 11, 2009, when Jennings proposed onstage at the Stanley Theater during a show in Utica, New York. They have two children together. Jennings and De Matteo eventually ended their relationship without marrying.

De Matteo lost her apartment of 22 years when a gas explosion and fire destroyed three buildings in Manhattan on March 26, 2015.

In July 2024, De Matteo revealed on a podcast that her 13-year-old son edited one picture of her in a superhero suit for her content posted on the platform OnlyFans.

De Matteo co-endorsed Robert F. Kennedy Jr. and Donald Trump in the 2024 U.S. presidential election.

== Filmography ==
=== Film ===
Year	Title	Role	Notes
1996	'M' Word	-	
1999	Meet Prince Charming	Hilary Harris	
2000	Sleepwalk	Henrieta	
2001	'R Xmas	The Wife	
2001	Swordfish	Melissa	
2001	Made	Club Girl	
2002	The Perfect You	Dee	
2002	Deuces Wild	Betsy	
2003	Prey for Rock & Roll	Tracey	
2004	Beacon Hill	Cadet Ramsey	
2004	Love Rome	Angela	
2005	Assault on Precinct 13	Iris Ferry	
2006	Walker Payne	Lou Ann	
2006	Farce of the Penguins	Ester (voice)	
2007	The Good Life	Dana	
2007	Broken English	Audrey Andrews	
2008	Lake City	Hope	
2009	New York, I Love You	Lydia	
2009	Once More with Feeling	Lana Gregorio	Video
2010	Fakers	Tanner's Mother	TV movie
2011	Mob Wives	Drita D'Avanzo	Short
2012	Mob Wives 2: The Christening	Drita D'Avanzo	Short
2013	Stalkers	Diane Harkin	TV movie
2013	Free Ride	Sandy	
2015	Dark Places	Krissi Cates	
2015	Sex, Death and Bowling	Ana	
2015	Street Level	Angela	
2017	Don't Sleep	Jo Marino	
2021	Far More	Ana	
2022	Safe Room	Rocco	
2022	Collide	Angie	
2022	One Way	Vic	
2025	Nonnas	Stella	

=== Television ===
Year	Title	Role	Notes
1996	Swift Justice	Laurie Tuco	Episode: "Stones"
1999–2006	The Sopranos	Adriana La Cerva	Recurring Cast: Season 1 & 6, Main Cast: Season 2–5
2002	VH1 Big in 2002 Awards	Herself/Host	Main Host
2003	The Greatest	Herself	Episode: "100 Greatest Songs from the Past 25 Years"
2004	Rocked with Gina Gershon	Herself	Episode: "Episode #1.2"
2004–2006	Joey	Gina Tribbiani	Main Cast
2005	HBO First Look	Herself	Episode: "Assault on Precinct 13: Caught in the Crosshairs"
2007	Aperture	Herself	Episode: "Drea de Matteo/Laurie Simmons"
2008–2014	Sons of Anarchy	Wendy Case	Recurring Cast: Season 1 & 4–6; Main Cast: Season 7
2009–2010	Desperate Housewives	Angie Bolen	Main Cast: Season 6
2010	Running Wilde	Didi	Episode: "One Step Forward"
2011	Law & Order: Special Victims Unit	Sandra Roberts	Episode: "Pop"
2011	CSI: Miami	Evelyn	Episode: "Sinner Takes All"
2012	Californication	Holly	Episode: "Here I Go Again"
2013	The Mindy Project	Kelsey	Episode: "Mindy's Minute"
2015	Agents of S.H.I.E.L.D.	Karla Faye Gideon	Episode: "One of Us"
2016–2018	Shades of Blue	Det. Tess Nazario	Main Cast
2017	Bizarre Transmissions from the Bermuda Triangle	Herself	Episode: "Space Cake: Part 2"
2019	A Million Little Things	Barbara Morgan	Recurring Cast: Season 1–2
2021	Match Game	Herself/Celebrity Panelist	Episode: "Episode #5.11"
2021	Paradise City	Maya	Main Cast
2023	Mayans M.C.	Wendy Case	Episode: "I Must Go in Now for the Fog Is Rising"
2024	Power Book II: Ghost	Melissa	Episode: "Higher Calling"
2024	Gutfeld!	Herself/Panelist	Episode: "Episode #4.29"
2024	Wise Guy: David Chase and the Sopranos	Herself	Documentary

=== Music Video ===
Year	Song Title	Artist
2012	"The Deed and the Dollar"	Shooter Jennings

=== Documentary ===
Year	Title
2018	"Wasted Talent"

== Awards and nominations ==
Year	Association	Category	Project	Result	Ref.
2000	Screen Actors Guild Award	Outstanding Ensemble in a Drama Series	The Sopranos (season 2)	Nominated	
2001	Screen Actors Guild Award	Outstanding Ensemble in a Drama Series	The Sopranos (season 3)	Nominated	
2002	Screen Actors Guild Award	Outstanding Ensemble in a Drama Series	The Sopranos (season 4)	Nominated	
2004	Screen Actors Guild Award	Outstanding Ensemble in a Drama Series	The Sopranos (season 5)	Nominated	
2004	Screen Actors Guild Award	Outstanding Actress in a Drama Series	The Sopranos (season 5)	Nominated	
2004	Primetime Emmy Awards	Outstanding Supporting Actress in a Drama Series	The Sopranos (episode: "Irregular Around the Margins" + "Long Term Parking")	Won	
2004	Golden Globe Awards	Best Supporting Actress – Series, Miniseries or Television Film	The Sopranos	Nominated	
2004	Gracie Awards	Outstanding Supporting Actress in a Drama Series	The Sopranos	Won	
