= Chelsea on the Rocks =

- Directed by: Abel Ferrara
- Written by: Abel Ferrara; David Linter; Chris Zois
- Produced by: Jen Gatien; David D. Wasserman
- Starring: Vito Acconci; Donald Baechler; Stanley Bard; Sathima Bea Benjamin; Jamie Burke; Christy Scott Cashman; Robert Crumb; Giancarlo Esposito; Abel Ferrara; Miloš Forman; Adam Goldberg; Ethan Hawke; Gaby Hoffmann; Dennis Hopper; Grace Jones; Bijou Phillips; Zaldy
- Cinematography: David Hausen; Ken Kelsch
- Edited by: Langdon Page
- Music by: Robert Burger
- Release dates: May 23, 2008 (Cannes); October 2, 2009 (United States)
- Running time: 89 minutes
- Country: United States
- Language: English

Chelsea on the Rocks is a documentary film directed by Abel Ferrara about the Hotel Chelsea. The film features Ferrara interviewing people who have and had lived at the hotel, intercut with dramatized footage of some famous events that took place there. During the film's interviews and docudrama Gaby Hoffmann, Ethan Hawke, Dennis Hopper, Robert Crumb, Adam Goldberg, Grace Jones, Miloš Forman, and Bijou Phillips make appearances.

The film premiered at the 2008 Cannes Film Festival out of competition, and opened in theatres on October 2, 2009.

== Reception ==
On review aggregator Rotten Tomatoes, the film holds an approval rating of 71% based on 28 reviews, with an average rating of 6.92/10. The website's critical consensus reads: "Abel Ferrara's loving portrait of New York's Chelsea Hotel is less interested in telling the story of its famous residents than in exploring the magic of the place that housed so many moments in rock history".
