= Siberia (2020 film) =

2020 film

- Theatrical release poster
- Directed by: Abel Ferrara
- Written by: Abel Ferrara; Christ Zois
- Produced by: Marta Donzelli; Gregorio Paonessa; Philipp Kreuzer; Jörg Schulze; Julio Chavezmontes; Diana Phillips
- Starring: Willem Dafoe; Dounia Sichov; Simon McBurney; Cristina Chiriac; Daniel Giménez Cacho
- Cinematography: Stefano Falivene
- Edited by: Fabio Nunziata; Leonardo Daniel Bianchi
- Music by: Joe Delia
- Production companies: Vivo Film; Rai Cinema; Maze Pictures; Piano; Faliro House; Rimsky Productions; Bavaria Filmproduktion
- Distributed by: Nexo Digital (Italy); Port au Prince Pictures (Germany)
- Release dates: 24 February 2020 (Berlinale); 2 July 2020 (Germany); 20 August 2020 (Italy)
- Running time: 92 minutes
- Countries: Italy; Germany; Mexico
- Language: English
- Box office: $23,645

Siberia is a 2020 psychological thriller film co-written and directed by Abel Ferrara. It stars Willem Dafoe as an outcast in a small village in Siberia.

The film had its world premiere in the main competition of the 70th Berlin International Film Festival on 24 February 2020, where it was nominated for the Golden Bear. It was released theatrically in Germany on 2 July 2020 by Port au Prince Pictures and in Pfunders (Italy) on 20 August 2020 by Nexo Digital.

== Premise ==
Clint, an English speaker, has abandoned his former life and now runs a bar in Siberia where most of the few guests do not speak English. He has hallucinations and embarks on a dog-sled journey to a nearby cave where he confronts his dreams and memories, including of his father, brother, former wife and son, trying to make sense of his life.

== Cast ==
- Willem Dafoe as Clint
- Dounia Sichov as wife
- Simon McBurney as magician
- Daniel Giménez Cacho as doctor
- Cristina Chiriac as Russian woman
- Anna Ferrara as Clint's son

== Production ==
The film is the sixth collaboration between Ferrara and Dafoe. The film also features Ferrara's wife Cristina and daughter, Anna, who plays Clint's son.

The film was inspired by Carl Jung's The Red Book.

== Release ==
The film had its world premiere at the 70th Berlin International Film Festival on 24 February 2020. It was released theatrically in Germany on 2 July 2020 by Port au Prince Pictures and in Italy on 20 August 2020 by Nexo Digital. In the United States, Siberia was released in select theaters and for digital rental on 18 June 2021 by Lionsgate.

== Reception ==
=== Box office ===
Siberia grossed $23,626 in Italy.

=== Critical response ===
On review aggregator Rotten Tomatoes, the film holds an approval rating of 62% based on 37 reviews, with an average rating of 5.2/10. The site's critics consensus states, "Willem Dafoe delivers another outstanding performance in the central role, although it's undercut by Siberia's frustratingly elliptical approach." On Metacritic, the film has a weighted average score of 56 out of 100, based on eight critics, indicating "mixed or average reviews". Guy Lodge of Variety called it a "beautiful, unhinged, sometimes hilarious trek into geographical and psychological wilderness that will delight some and mystify many others".
