= 4:44 Last Day on Earth =

2011 film by Abel Ferrara

- Theatrical release poster
- Directed by: Abel Ferrara
- Written by: Abel Ferrara
- Produced by: Juan de Dios Larraín; Pablo Larraín; Peter Danner; Vincent Maraval; Brahim Chioua
- Starring: Willem Dafoe; Shanyn Leigh; Natasha Lyonne; Paul Hipp
- Cinematography: Ken Kelsch
- Edited by: Anthony Redman
- Music by: Francis Kuipers
- Production companies: Fábula; Funny Balloons; Wild Bunch; Bullet Pictures; Off Hollywood Pictures
- Distributed by: IFC Films (United States); Capricci Films (France)
- Release dates: September 6, 2011 (Venice); March 23, 2012 (United States); December 19, 2012 (France)
- Running time: 84 minutes
- Countries: United States; France; Switzerland; Chile
- Language: English
- Box office: $70,851

4:44 Last Day on Earth is a 2011 apocalyptic drama film written and directed by Abel Ferrara and starring Willem Dafoe, Shanyn Leigh, Natasha Lyonne, and Paul Hipp. An international co-production of the United States, France, Switzerland, and Chile, the film received mixed reviews from critics upon release.

== Plot ==
Set in New York City, the film focuses on the relationship between two people as they await the end of all life on Earth. Scientists and theologians alike have predicted that, by the next morning at 4:44 a.m., deadly solar and cosmic radiation will destroy the Earth's ozone layer, and all life on the planet with it. Mixed in throughout the film are news clips of various reporters, commentators and celebrities who contemplate what the end of the world will be like.

Cisco and Skye confine themselves to a loft in the city. Cisco is a successful middle-aged actor who just wants to spend his last hours with the woman he cares about. Skye is a young artist whose latest project, a large painting on the floor, serves as an outlet for her emotions.

Cisco and Skye notice how strangely calm the city is, aside from isolated reports of looting, protests and suicides. They occasionally break away from watching the news to have sex, and, afterwards, Skye continues to work on her painting, always changing her clothes for each new layer of paint she adds.

They order Vietnamese food and give all of their US$400 to the delivery boy. They allow him to use their laptop computer to talk with his parents in Vietnam via Skype software. After the delivery boy leaves, Cisco and Skye each use the computer to talk with their families: Cisco talks with his ex-wife and his estranged teenage daughter, and Skye talks with her mother.

When the pair have an argument over their insecurities, Cisco walks out and goes to the apartment of two old friends, Noah and Tina, who are enjoying drugs in the company of a local drug dealer. After a long talk about life and being with the people they love, Cisco leaves to rejoin Skye at the loft, where they wait until 4:44 a.m. They die in each other's embrace, as Skye is reciting her marriage vows.

== Cast ==
- Willem Dafoe as Cisco
- Shanyn Leigh as Skye
- Natasha Lyonne as Tina
- Paul Hipp as Noah
- Anita Pallenberg as Diana
- Paz de la Huerta as girl on street
- Pat Kiernan as news anchor

== Production ==
Ferrara began shooting the film in April 2011 with his longtime cinematographer Ken Kelsch. 4:44 is Willem Dafoe's third collaboration with Ferrara after 1998's New Rose Hotel and his last feature film, 2007's Go Go Tales. During Montclair State University's film forum event in February 2011, Ferrara revealed that Ethan Hawke was slated to star originally. The film was shot in one location, an apartment, set during the course of the last 24 hours before the scripted end of life on Earth due to the ozone layer. This demise was attributed in the film without explanation, except for vague references to "Al Gore was right" and stock film footage featuring the former vice president as he claims that Greenland's and West Antarctica's ice cap melt-off would raise the ocean's levels between "four and 12 meters".

== Release ==
The film showed in competition at the 68th Venice International Film Festival in September 2011. It had a limited theatrical release in the United States on March 23, 2012.

== Reception ==
On Rotten Tomatoes, the film holds an approval rating of 48% based on 33 reviews, with an average rating of 5.6/10. On Metacritic, the film has a weighted average score of 54 out of 100 based on 14 reviews, indicating "mixed or average" reviews.

== Product placement ==
Such notable brands are paid attention to in the film as McDonald's, Skype, Apple, S&P Simply Delicious, and some others. Skype software plays an important role in the screenplay, being mentioned several times, and its sounds being often heard. Cisco is another well-known telecommunications brand shown as a protagonist's name, the other protagonist's name differing from Skype brand by one letter only. Footage of riots in Egypt is used in the film as an example of people's discontent of the last day coming.

== Legacy ==
There is a song by ambient musician 'reverie' titled (4:44) Last Day On Earth which serves as a direct reference to this film.
