= King of New York =

1990 film by Abel Ferrara

- Theatrical release poster
- Directed by: Abel Ferrara
- Written by: Nicholas St. John
- Produced by: Augusto Caminito; Mary Kane
- Starring: Christopher Walken; Laurence Fishburne; David Caruso; Victor Argo; Wesley Snipes; Janet Julian; Joey Chin; Giancarlo Esposito; Paul Calderon
- Cinematography: Bojan Bazelli
- Edited by: Anthony Redman
- Music by: Joe Delia
- Production companies: Reteitalia; Scena International; Penta Film
- Distributed by: Carolco Pictures (through New Line Cinema)
- Release date: September 28, 1990
- Running time: 103 minutes
- Countries: United States; Italy
- Language: English
- Budget: $5 million
- Box office: $2.6 million

King of New York is a 1990 neo-noir crime film directed by Abel Ferrara and written by Nicholas St. John. It stars Christopher Walken, Laurence Fishburne, David Caruso, Victor Argo and Wesley Snipes, with supporting roles played by Giancarlo Esposito, Steve Buscemi, Paul Calderón, Janet Julian and Theresa Randle. Walken portrays Frank White, a New York City drug kingpin rebuilding his criminal empire after his release from prison, while also attempting to go legitimate.

The film was released by Carolco Pictures (through New Line Cinema) on September 28, 1990. It received mixed reviews from critics, with several criticizing the film's violence and dark tone. Retrospective reviews have been much more positive, and the film has been described as one of Ferrara's best.

== Plot ==
Drug lord Frank White strives to control New York City's criminal underground. Shortly after his release from Sing Sing Penitentiary, White and his crew, led by his trigger-happy right-hand man Jimmy Jump, consolidate power by eliminating their rivals in the Colombian drug cartel and Triad. White personally executes a Mafia boss who refuses to cooperate with him.

White's exploits catch the attention of the NYPD's narcotics squad. Detectives Bishop, Gilley and Flanigan confront White but lack any tangible evidence to arrest him. They instead turn their attention to White's henchmen, whom they arrest after a surviving member of the Colombian drug cartel agrees to cooperate with the police.

White's lawyers intervene and free the men from jail. Gilley and Flanigan, extremely frustrated at White's use of the law to dodge justice, decide to simply murder White and his crew. They storm a night club where White is partying and kill many of his men. White and Jump survive the raid but are chased by Gilley and Flanigan. Jump ambushes and mortally wounds Flanigan. Gilley is unable to resuscitate his partner, and shoots Jump in the head in a fit of rage.

A grief-stricken Gilley attends Flanigan's funeral, where he is abruptly assassinated by White in a drive-by shooting. White then confronts detective Bishop in his own apartment. He holds him at gunpoint while explaining that he eliminated the Colombian drug cartel and Triad in New York City because he disapproved of their involvement in human trafficking and child prostitution. White restrains Bishop to a chair and leaves.

Bishop uses a gun from a nearby drawer and frees himself and chases White into the subway. Both men draw guns on each other, but White uses an innocent bystander as a human shield. The two exchange gunfire and Bishop is killed. White exits the subway and makes his way to a taxi in Times Square. He clutches a gunshot wound to his torso and watches as the police surround his taxi, as White then goes limp as the police close in on him.

== Cast ==
- Christopher Walken as Frank White
- David Caruso as Detective Dennis Gilley
- Laurence Fishburne (as Larry Fishburne) as James "Jimmy Jump" Colt
- Victor Argo as Lieutenant Roy Bishop
- Wesley Snipes as Detective Tommy Flanigan
- Janet Julian as Jennifer
- Giancarlo Esposito as Lance
- Paul Calderón as Joey Dalesio
- Steve Buscemi as "Test Tube"
- Joey Chin as Larry Wong
- Theresa Randle as Raye
- Leonard L. Thomas as "Blood"
- Roger Guenveur Smith as Tanner
- Carrie Nygren as Melanie
- Ernest Abuba as "King Tito" Salvador
- Frank Adonis as Paul Calgari
- Erica Gimpel as Dr. Shute
- Frank Gio as Arty Clay
- Robert LaSardo as Nico
- Harold Perrineau as Subway Mugger
- James Lorinz as Detective Tip Connolly
- Gary Landon Mills as "Chilly"
- Alonna Shaw as Kathleen Mulligan-Connolly
- Jay Julien as Abraham Cott
- Freddy Howard as Emilio "El Zapa"
- Lia Chang as Triad Member
- Vanessa Angel as British Woman
- Phoebe Legere as Prostitute
- David Proval as Card Player (uncredited)

The film also includes cameo appearances by Freddie Jackson, Pete Hamill and Ariane Koizumi as themselves.

== Production ==
=== Development ===
Abel Ferrara and Nicholas St. John had wanted to make King of New York since the early 1980s. Ferrara had shot test footage and begun casting calls as early as 1981, but shelved the project. Over the intervening nine years, the script was heavily rewritten.

Due to the film's controversial subject matter, Ferrara had difficulty finding an American studio willing to back the picture. The film was ultimately financed entirely by Italian companies Reteitalia and Scena International. Producer Augusto Caminito described the project as a bridge between Italian and American film industries, and likened the story to a modern-day Robin Hood.

=== Filming ===
Principal photography began on April 19 and June 14, 1989. King of New York was shot entirely in and around New York City. According to Ferrara, then-owner Donald Trump gave him permission to film at the Plaza Hotel at no charge, on the condition that Walken would pose for a photograph with Ivana Trump, who was a fan of the actor.

Filming locations included Sing Sing, the Plaza Hotel, Times Square, Times Square–42nd Street station, Williamsburg, Queensboro Bridge, Fifth Avenue, Ossining, and Saranac Lake. Silvercup Studios served as the main studio.

The film initially received an X rating from the MPAA, but was reduced to an R after an appeal.

=== Music ===
The film was scored by Ferrara's regular collaborator Joe Delia, and features two tracks by rapper Schoolly D — "Am I Black Enough for You?" and "Saturday Night".

== Reception ==
=== Critical response ===
On Rotten Tomatoes, the film has an approval rating of 72% based on 32 reviews, with an average rating of 6.8/10. The website's critics consensus reads, "King of New York covers familiar narrative ground with impressive style—and leaves plenty of room for its talented cast to deliver gripping performances." On Metacritic the film has a weighted average score of 66 out of 100 based on 20 critics, indicating "generally favorable" reviews.

Total Film rated King of New York four stars out of five. Roger Ebert awarded two stars out of four, citing Walken's "usual polished and somehow sinister ease" and the director's strong command of mood and style, marred by a sketchy screenplay and a fragmented plot. Mark Caro, writing for the Chicago Tribune, gave the movie only 1/2 star, adding that star Christopher Walken and the movie remain "just out of grasp".

=== Accolades ===
The film was featured in Steven Jay Schneider's 7th Edition of 1001 Movies You Must See Before You Die.

Bojan Bazelli was nominated for an Independent Spirit Award for Best Cinematography.

== In popular culture ==
The film has been noted for its influence on the hip-hop culture. Rapper The Notorious B.I.G. sometimes referred to himself as "The Black Frank White" and "The King Of New York" after the main character of this film. Similarly, Pop Smoke compared himself to Walken's character, including in his 2020 song "Christopher Walking". Ras Kass expressed admiration for the film.

== Home media ==
King of New York was released on a 2-Disc Special Edition DVD on April 20, 2004. The film was released on Blu-ray on October 23, 2007. Arrow Video has released this film in 4K Ultra HD disk.

== See also ==
- List of cult films
