= The Blackout (1997 film) =

- Directed by: Abel Ferrara
- Written by: Abel Ferrara; Marla Hanson; Chris Zois
- Produced by: Edward R. Pressman; Clayton Townsend
- Starring: Matthew Modine
- Cinematography: Ken Kelsch
- Edited by: Anthony Redman
- Music by: Joe Delia
- Production company: MDP Worldwide
- Distributed by: Destination Films
- Release date: June 11, 1997
- Running time: 98 minutes
- Country: United States
- Language: English
- Box office: $110.000

The Blackout is a 1997 American drama film directed by Abel Ferrara and starring Matthew Modine. It was screened out of competition at the 1997 Cannes Film Festival.

== Plot ==
Matty is an actor and popular film star who is tired of Hollywood life and moves to Miami, where he makes a marriage proposal to his French girlfriend Annie. She is not ready to marry him, and it is revealed that she had an abortion. Depressed because he lost his baby (though it was he who initially asked for abortion), Matty, together with his friend Mickey, go out for a wild night. At a nightclub, they meet a young waitress also named Annie and at the end of the night Matty passes out.

A year and a half later, Matty lives in New York, leads a clean life visiting AA meetings and has a relationship with an attractive model named Susan. He is still obsessed with his former girlfriend Annie, and about the mysterious missing part of his night back in Miami. Matty travels back to Miami to look up some old friends as well as try to find Annie 1, who vanished without a trace. Matty eventually learns that some secrets from his past are best left unrevealed.

== Cast ==
- Matthew Modine as Matty
- Claudia Schiffer as Susan
- Béatrice Dalle as Annie 1
- Sarah Lassez as Annie 2
- Dennis Hopper as Mickey Wayne
- Steven Bauer as Mickey's Studio Actor
- Laura Bailey as Mickey's Studio Actress
- Nancy Ferrara as Mickey's Studio Actress
- Andrew Fiscella as Mickey's Studio Actor (credited as Andy Fiscella)
- Vincent Lamberti as Mickey's Studio Actor
- Victoria Duffy as Script Girl
- Nicholas De Cegli as Miami Drug Dealer
- Daphne Duplaix as Daphne, Fly Girl
- Mercy Lopez as Jasmine, Fly Girl
- Lori Eastside as That Girl
- Shareef Malnik as Gold Carder
- Peter Cannold as Movie Investor
