= Andrew Fiscella =

American actor (born 1966)

Andy Fiscella
- Born: May 25, 1966 (age 60); United States of America
- Other name: Andy Fiscella
- Occupation: Actor/Producer/Publisher/BarNightclub Owner
- Years active: 1995–present
- Notable work: Quarantine; The Final Destination

Andrew "Andy" Fiscella (born May 25, 1966) is an American actor who appeared in the films Quarantine and The Final Destination. He also appeared in Ice Cube's music video "Why We Thugs".

== Filmography ==
Year	Film	Role
1995	Cousin Howard	Arthur
1996	The Funeral	Murder Witness
1997	Made Men	Sal Ponti
1997	Catherine's Grove	Nick Pirelli
1997	The Blackout	Mickey's Studio Actor
1997	Form, Space & Murder	Robert Gordon
1998	New Rose Hotel	Sex Show Man
1999	Penance	Party Boy
2001	'R Xmas	Accomplice No. 1
2004	The Deep and Dreamless Sleep	Leon
2004	After The Sunset	Popcorn Victim
2005	xXx: State of the Union	Guard
2007	Vacancy	Steven R
2007	Gardener Of Eden	Officer Bob
2008	The Alphabet Killer	Len Schafer
2008	Prom Night	Officer
2008	Fix	Harry K. Rothstein
2008	Fragments	Numbers Man
2008	Quarantine	Officer James McCreedy
2009	The Final Destination	Andy Kewzer
2009	Armored	Dispatcher # 1
2010	Rough Hustle	Vic
2010	Takers	Security Chief
2010	A Nightmare On Elm Street	Inmate

== Television ==
Year	Title	Role	Episode
1998	Sex and the City	Working Class Guy	Episode: Bay of Married Pigs
2001	Law & Order	Threat Assessment Officer	Episode: Judge Dread
2002	Law & Order: Criminal Intent	Frank Caspari	Episode: Phantom
2005	CSI: NY	Mickey D' Amato	Episode: Zoo York
2005	Meet the Barkers	Himself	Episode: Episode 7 and "Travis' Birthday Bash"
2010	House, M.D.	Niles	Episode: A Pox on Our House

== Music video ==
2006 - Why We Thugs by Ice Cube - Himself
