= Abel Ferrara =

American filmmaker and actor (born 1951)

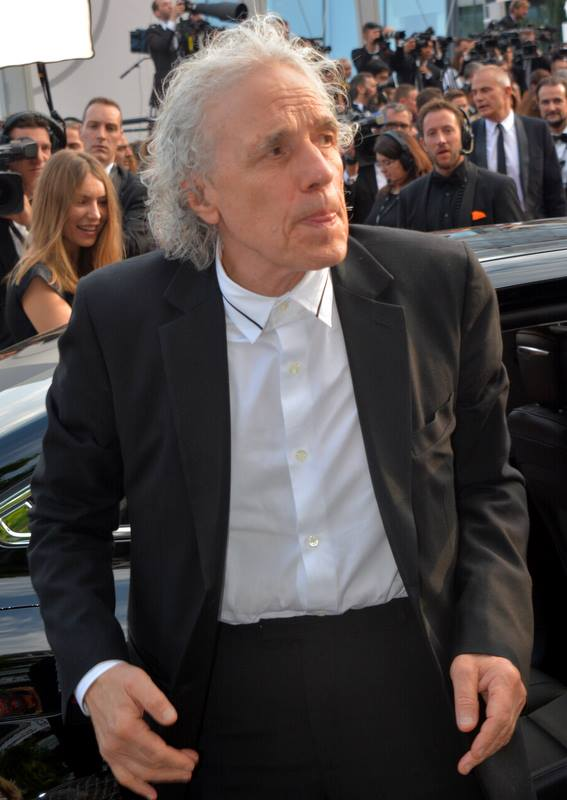
- Ferrara at the 2017 Cannes Film Festival
- Born: July 19, 1951 (age 75); New York City, New York, U.S.
- Other names: Jimmy Boy L; Jimmy Laine
- Education: Rockland Community College; SUNY Purchase; San Francisco Art Institute
- Occupations: Film director; screenwriter; actor; producer; musician; songwriter
- Years active: 1971–present
- Spouses: Nancy Ferrara (m. 1982, divorced): Cristina Chiriac
- Children: 3
- Website: abelferrara.com

Abel Ferrara (born July 19, 1951) is an American filmmaker, actor and musician. Closely associated with the independent film movement in the United States, he is known for his provocative and often-controversial films which use and redefine neo-noir imagery. His best-known works include the New York-set, gritty crime thrillers The Driller Killer (1979), Ms .45 (1981), Fear City (1984), King of New York (1990), Bad Lieutenant (1992), and The Funeral (1996), chronicling violent crime in urban settings with spiritual overtones.

He has worked in a wide array of genres, including the sci-fi horror film Body Snatchers (1993), the cyberpunk thriller New Rose Hotel (1998), the religious drama Mary (2005), the black comedy Go Go Tales (2007), and the biopics Pasolini (2014) and Padre Pio (2022), as well as several documentary projects. Since 2001, he has worked predominantly in Europe.

Ferrara has received several accolades throughout his career. He has been twice nominated for the Independent Spirit Award for Best Director. Six of his films have been nominated for the Golden Lion at the Venice Film Festival, and he has been twice nominated for the Golden Bear and once for the Palme d'Or. In 2004, Ferrara received the Premi Flaiano for Cinema.

== Early life and education ==
Ferrara was born in the Bronx of Italian and Irish descent. He was raised Catholic, which influenced much of his work. At 8 years old, he moved to Peekskill in Westchester County, New York, and he started making movies at Rockland Community College. Later, he attended the film conservatory at SUNY Purchase, where he directed several short films.

== Career ==
=== Early work (1971–1981) ===
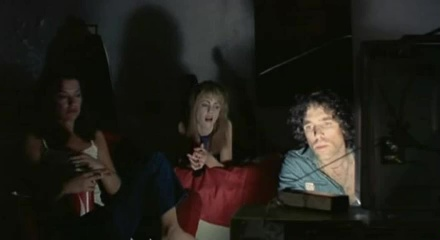
Ferrara (far right) in The Driller Killer

Ferrara studied at the San Francisco Art Institute; one of his teachers and influences there was the famous avant-garde director Rosa von Praunheim. In the early 1970s, while still in art school, Ferrara directed a number of independently produced short films which included The Hold Up and Could This Be Love. Finding himself out of work after leaving film school in 1976, Ferrara directed his first feature: a pornographic film titled 9 Lives of a Wet Pussy, using a pseudonym. Starring with his then-girlfriend, he recalled having to step in front of the camera for one scene to perform in a hardcore sex scene: "It's bad enough paying a guy $200 to fuck your girlfriend, then he can't get it up."

Ferrara first drew a cult following with his second feature film, an exploitation movie titled The Driller Killer (1979), an urban slasher film (co-starring Carolyn Marz and Baybi Day actor Pamela Bergling) about an artist (played by the director himself) who goes on a killing spree with a power drill. In the United Kingdom, the movie made it on a list of "video nasties" created by moral crusaders that led to prosecutions under the Obscene Publications Act 1959 and to the passing of new legislation which forced all video releases to appear before the British Board of Film Classification for rating.

The director's next feature was Ms .45 (1981), a "rape revenge" movie about a mute garment worker turned vigilante (Zoë Tamerlis). Reviewers called it "a provocative, disreputable movie, well worth seeing".

=== Rise to international fame (1984–1998) ===
In 1984, Ferrara was hired to direct Fear City, starring Melanie Griffith, Billy Dee Williams, Rae Dawn Chong and María Conchita Alonso. When a "kung fu slasher" stalks and murders young women who work in a seedy Times Square strip club, a disgraced boxer portrayed by Tom Berenger uses his fighting skills to defeat the killer.

Ferrara worked on two Michael Mann-produced television series, directing the two-hour pilot for Crime Story (aired September 18, 1986), starring Dennis Farina, and two episodes of the series Miami Vice.

King of New York (1990) stars Christopher Walken as gangster Frank White, Laurence Fishburne, Wesley Snipes, David Caruso and Giancarlo Esposito. The movie received overall mixed reviews, but Ferrara was praised for his strong command of mood and style. Critic Roger Ebert wrote, "What Ferrara needs for his next film is a sound screenplay."

Bad Lieutenant (1992) credits Ferrara and actress Zoë Tamerlis, who plays the woman who helps the Lieutenant freebase heroin in the movie, as co-writers of the script, but Tamerlis claimed that she wrote it alone. Bad Lieutenant received Spirit Awards nominations for Best Director and Best Actor, and despite its controversial content, the movie was lauded by critics. Director Martin Scorsese named it one of his top 10 films of the 1990s.

In 1993, Ferrara was hired for two Hollywood studio movies: another remake of Invasion of the Body Snatchers, titled Body Snatchers (1993), for Warner Bros.; and Dangerous Game (1993), starring Keitel and Madonna, for MGM.

In the mid-1990s Ferrara directed two well-received independent movies: The Addiction (1995), photographed in black-and-white, stars Lili Taylor as a philosophy student who succumbs to a vampire as she studies the problem of evil and philosophical pedagogy, represented by the most violent events of the 20th century. The movie also features Christopher Walken, Annabella Sciorra, Edie Falco, Kathryn Erbe and Michael Imperioli. It was co-produced by Russell Simmons.

The Funeral (1996), starring Walken, Sciorra, Chris Penn, Isabella Rossellini, Benicio del Toro, Vincent Gallo and Gretchen Mol, was nominated for five Independent Spirit Awards including Best Director.

Following the success of The Funeral, Ferrara had an infamous interview with Conan O'Brien on October 23, 1996. Ferrara was believed to be intoxicated and struggled through the interview, often slurring and covering his face as well as waving around a cigarette. O'Brien would later state that Ferrara was his "worst guest ever". Eventually, O'Brien revealed to Ferrara's frequent collaborator Willem Dafoe that Ferrara "ran away" and that the segment producer had to "run down the street" to catch him and bring him back to the set. Dafoe said to O'Brien, "You did your best ... and so did he!"

After making The Blackout (1997) with Matthew Modine and Dennis Hopper, he contributed to the omnibus television movie Subway Stories. Ferrara then made New Rose Hotel (1998), which reunited him with Christopher Walken.

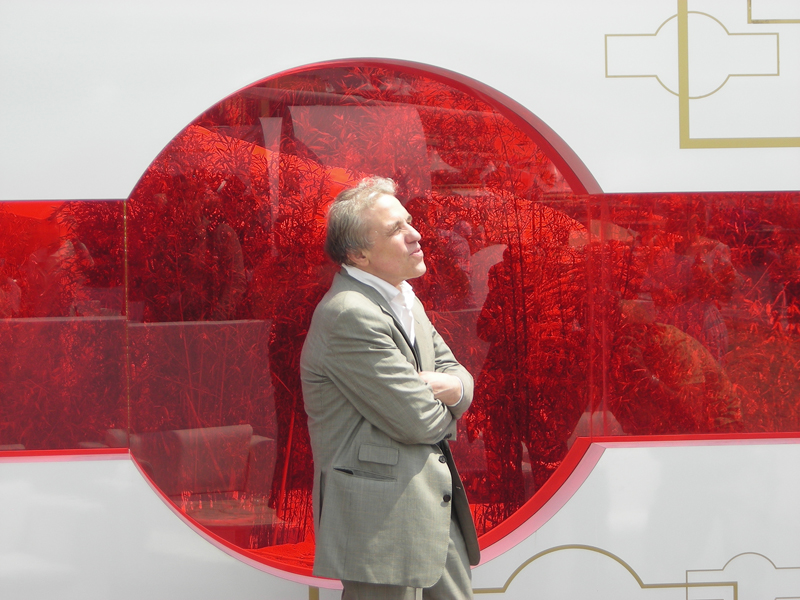
Ferrara in 2008

=== In Europe (2001–present) ===
Ferrara returned three years later with 'R Xmas (2001), which starred Drea de Matteo and Ice-T. He recorded commentaries for Driller Killer and King of New York and made Mary (2005), a religious-themed multi-plot movie starring Juliette Binoche, Matthew Modine, Forest Whitaker, Heather Graham, Marion Cotillard, and Stefania Rocca. Mary premiered at the Venice Film Festival in 2005. It swept the awards ceremony, garnering the Grand Jury Prize, SIGNIS Award and two others. It was shown at the Toronto International Film Festival.

In 2007, Ferrara directed Go Go Tales a comedy with Modine, Bob Hoskins and Willem Dafoe that premiered at the Cannes Film Festival but was not shown in the United States until a special screening at the Anthology Film Archives in 2011.

In 2009, Jekyll and Hyde was set to star Forest Whitaker and 50 Cent. After disagreements with Warner Bros., the movie was shelved in 2010.

In 2009, Napoli, Napoli, Napoli premiered out of competition at the 66th Venice International Film Festival. The docudrama received little attention and poor reviews but Werner Herzog's reboot Bad Lieutenant: Port of Call New Orleans was selected for competition at the prestigious festival. Asked about the Herzog film, Ferrara was quoted widely saying "I wish these people die in hell".

In September 2011, 4:44 Last Day on Earth, starring Willem Dafoe and Shanyn Leigh, premiered at the main competition of the 68th Venice International Film Festival.

Ferrara's Welcome to New York, a fictionalized version of the Dominique Strauss-Kahn sexual assault case starring Gérard Depardieu and Jacqueline Bisset, was released on video on demand in 2014. Ferrara's Pasolini (2014) about the titular Italian director stars Willem Dafoe.

After a 4-year long hiatus, Ferrara came back in 2019 with Tommaso, a new feature starring Dafoe and set in Rome. The film had its world premiere at the 72nd Cannes Film Festival on 20 May 2019. It was released in the United States by Kino Lorber.

The following year, with Siberia (2020), Ferrara and Dafoe collaborated for the sixth time. Inspired by Carl Jung's The Red Book, the script was written by Ferrara and Chris Zois. The film had its world premiere at the main competition of the 70th Berlin International Film Festival, on 24 February 2020. It was released in the United States by Lionsgate in 2021. Shortly after Ferrara directed the documentary Sportin' Life, about the beginning of quarantine measures in Europe a few days after the Berlinale premiere of Siberia, during the start of the COVID-19 pandemic. The documentary had its world premiere at the 77th Venice Film Festival on 4 September 2020.

Since 2020 he has interpreted Gabriele Tinti's poetry giving voice to the masterpieces in the Galleria Nazionale d'Arte Antica, Pinacoteca di Brera, Museo Nazionale di San Marco, Ca' d'Oro, Musée Jacquemart-André and Museo Nazionale Romano

In August 2021, Zeros and Ones, starring Ethan Hawke, had its world premiere at the main competition of the 74th Locarno Film Festival, during the festival Ferrara won the Best Direction Award. The film was released in limited theaters and on demand by Lionsgate on November 19, 2021.

In 2022, Ferrara's Padre Pio, starring Shia LaBeouf and Asia Argento, premiered at the "Giornate degli Autori" section of the 79th Venice Film Festival on September 2, 2022. The film was released in the United States by Gravitas Ventures on June 2, 2023. During the film's production, LeBeouf notably converted to Catholicism.

=== Unrealized projects ===
Abandoned directorial projects of Ferrara's include the aforementioned Jekyll and Hyde, as well as a Walken-penned John Holmes biopic starring Eric Roberts, a "Catholic Western" inspired by John Ford's The Searchers (1956), a sequel to Federico Fellini's La Dolce Vita (1960) starring del Toro or Steven Bauer as the protagonist's son, a remake of Akira Kurosawa's Yojimbo (1961) entitled Crack City Terminator starring Snipes and Fishburne, a dystopian L.A.-set thriller entitled Birds of Prey, the Neapolitan crime saga Pericle (2016), a prequel to King of New York entitled The Last Crew inspired by Roy DeMeo's Gambino-era "Murder Machine" gang, a Broadway revival of Miguel Piñero's Short Eyes, and a remake of Jean-Luc Godard's Alphaville (1965) starring Gérard Depardieu.

== Personal life ==
Ferrara was formerly domestic partners with the actress Cristina Chiriac, with whom he remains on friendly terms and shares a daughter, Anna. He was previously married to Nancy Ferrara. Ferrara has two adopted children: Endira and Lucy. He was also in a romantic relationship with actress Shanyn Leigh.

Ferrara lives in Rome, Italy in an apartment overlooking the Piazza Vittorio, a location that was the subject of his 2017 documentary Piazza Vittorio. He moved to the city following the 9/11 attacks because he said he wanted to get away from New York City and found it easier to secure financing for his movies in Europe.

In 2023, Ferrara stated he had been sober for 10 years.

=== Religious and spiritual beliefs ===
Raised Catholic, Ferrara started describing himself as Buddhist in 2007. When asked if he had converted, Ferrara responded,

It’s not a conversion, you’re not a card-carrying Catholic, you’re brought up Italian, so you’re brought up with those images. All the great art is financed by the Church so they have a monopoly on the paintings, and they’re powerful images, the whole nine yards of it. But Jesus was a living man, and so were Buddha and Muhammad. These three guys changed the fucking world, with their passion and love of other human beings. All these guys had was their word, and they came from fucking nowhere. I’m not saying Nazareth is nowhere – I’m sure Jesus came from a very cool neighbourhood.

— Abel Ferrara

Ferrara said in 2020 that Buddhism "is a practice for me, not a religion". In 2022, he stated he considered Padre Pio his "spirituality model".

== Influences ==
Influences on Ferrara's work include "the Stones and Dylan ... DaVinci, Stanley Kubrick, Woody Allen and all of the great New York film makers". He has also credited Pier Paolo Pasolini, Rainer Werner Fassbinder, and his mentor Rosa von Praunheim as influences.

=== Favorite films ===
Ferrara participated in the 2022 Sight and Sound Directors' Poll, which is held once every ten years for contemporary filmmakers to select their ten favorite films in no particular order. His selections were: Touch of Evil (1958), The Battle of Algiers (1966), 3 Women (1977), Raging Bull (1980), Salò, or the 120 Days of Sodom (1975), Family Nest (1979), A Woman Under the Influence (1974), The Shining (1980), Sherlock Jr. (1924) and Psycho (1960).

== Filmography ==
=== Feature films ===
Year	Title	Functioned as		Notes	Ref.
Year	Title	Director	Writer	Notes	Ref.
1976	9 Lives of a Wet Pussy	Yes	No	Credited as 'Jimmy Boy L.'	
1979	The Driller Killer	Yes	No	Also editor	
1981	Ms .45	Yes	No		
1984	Fear City	Yes	No		
1987	China Girl	Yes	No		
1989	Cat Chaser	Yes	No		
1990	King of New York	Yes	No		
1992	Bad Lieutenant	Yes	Yes		
1993	Body Snatchers	Yes	No		
1993	Dangerous Game	Yes	No		
1995	The Addiction	Yes	No		
1996	The Funeral	Yes	No		
1997	The Blackout	Yes	Yes		
1998	New Rose Hotel	Yes	Yes		
2001	'R Xmas	Yes	Yes		
2005	Mary	Yes	Yes		
2007	Go Go Tales	Yes	Yes		
2011	4:44 Last Day on Earth	Yes	Yes		
2014	Welcome to New York	Yes	Yes		
2014	Pasolini	Yes	Story		
2019	Tommaso	Yes	Yes		
2020	Siberia	Yes	Yes		
2021	Zeros and Ones	Yes	Yes		
2022	Padre Pio	Yes	Yes		

=== Documentary works ===
Year	Title	Functioned as		Notes	Ref.
Year	Title	Director	Writer	Notes	Ref.
1977	Not Guilty: For Keith Richards	Yes	No	Short	
2008	Chelsea on the Rocks	Yes	Yes		
2009	Napoli Napoli Napoli	Yes	Yes		
2010	Mulberry St.	Yes	No		
2017	Alive in France	Yes	Yes	Also composer	
2017	Piazza Vittorio	Yes	Yes		
2018	Talking with the Vampires	Yes	Yes	Short	
2019	The Projectionist	Yes	Yes		
2020	Sportin' Life	Yes	Yes		
2024	Turn in the Wound	Yes	No		

=== Short films ===
Year	Title	Functioned as		Notes
Year	Title	Director	Writer	Notes
1971	Nicky's Film	Yes	No	
1972	The Hold Up	Yes	Yes	
1973	Could This Be Love	Yes	Yes	
2010	42 One Dream Rush	Yes	No	Segment "Dream Piece"
2012	No Saints	Yes	No	
2017	Hans	Yes	Yes	

=== Television ===
Year	Title	Notes
1985	Miami Vice	Episodes: "The Home Invaders" and "The Dutch Oven"
1986	Crime Story	Episode: "Pilot"
1986	The Gladiator	TV movie
1988	The Loner	TV movie
1997	Subway Stories: Tales from the Underground	TV movie; segment "Love on the A Train"

=== Web ===
Year	Title	Notes	Ref.
2012	Pizza Connection	Webseries for Vice Media	

=== Music video ===
Year	Title	Artist
1996	California	Mylène Farmer
1999	Don't Change Your Plans	Ben Folds Five
2004	Rain	Abenaa

=== Acting roles ===
Year	Title	Role	Notes
1971	Nicky's Film	Man in Junkyard	
1972	The Hold Up	Johnny (voice)	Uncredited
1976	9 Lives of a Wet Pussy	Old Man	
1979	The Driller Killer	Reno	Credited as "Jimmy Laine"
1981	Ms .45	Rapist	Credited as "Jimmy Laine"
2006	Exes	Cain	
2009	Daddy Longlegs	Robber	
2012	My Big-Assed Mother	Charles Bukowski	
2014	Don Peyote	Taxi cab driver	
2016	Sculpt		
2017	Black Butterfly	Pat	
2018	Buon Lavoro		
2025	Marty Supreme	Ezra Mishkin	

== Recurring collaborators ==
Ferrara has recast many of the same actors in his movies, most notably Christopher Walken, Harvey Keitel and Willem Dafoe. Other actors he has recast include Annabella Sciorra and Matthew Modine as well as character actors such as Victor Argo, Paul Calderón and Giancarlo Esposito. David Caruso is another one of Ferrara's frequent film collaborators. Ms .45 (1981) star Zoë Lund collaborated with Ferrara again on Bad Lieutenant (1992), which she co-wrote. Gretchen Mol has worked with Ferrara twice. Forest Whitaker starred in Ferrara's movies Mary (2005) and Body Snatchers (1993).

Work Actor	1979	1981	1986	1987	1990	1992	1993	1993	1995	1996	1997	1998	2001	2005	2007	2008	2009	2011	2014	2014	2019	2020	2021	2022
Work Actor	The Driller Killer	Ms .45	Crime Story	China Girl	King of New York	Bad Lieutenant	Body Snatchers	Dangerous Game	The Addiction	The Funeral	The Blackout	New Rose Hotel	'R Xmas	Mary	Go Go Tales	Chelsea on the Rocks	Napoli Napoli Napoli	4:44 Last Day on Earth	Welcome to New York	Pasolini	Tommaso	Siberia	Zeros and Ones	Padre Pio
Asia Argento												X mark			X mark									X mark
Victor Argo					X mark	X mark		X mark		X mark		X mark	X mark											
Paul Calderón					X mark	X mark			X mark										X mark					
David Caruso			X mark	X mark	X mark																			
Cristina Chiriac																				X mark	X mark	X mark	X mark	
Willem Dafoe												X mark			X mark			X mark		X mark	X mark	X mark		
Giancarlo Esposito					X mark											X mark								
Abel Ferrara	X mark	X mark														X mark								
Anna Ferrara																					X mark	X mark	X mark	
Ethan Hawke																X mark							X mark	
Paul Hipp				X mark		X mark				X mark								X mark	X mark					
Dennis Hopper											X mark					X mark								
Harvey Keitel						X mark		X mark																
Shanyn Leigh														X mark	X mark		X mark	X mark	X mark					
Zoë Lund		X mark				X mark																		
Matthew Modine											X mark			X mark	X mark									
Gretchen Mol										X mark		X mark												
James Russo				X mark				X mark																
Riccardo Scamarcio															X mark					X mark				
Annabella Sciorra									X mark	X mark		X mark												
Christopher Walken					X mark				X mark	X mark		X mark												
Forest Whitaker							X mark							X mark										

Beginning with The Driller Killer in 1979 through The Projectionist in 2019, Ferrara most frequently worked with Ken Kelsch as his cinematographer. Joe Delia has been Ferrara's regular music composer since 9 Lives of a Wet Pussy in 1976.

== Awards and nominations ==
Institution	Year	Category	Work	Result	Ref.
Actor Awards	2026	Outstanding Performance by a Cast in a Motion Picture	Marty Supreme	Nominated	
Cahiers du Cinéma	1993	Annual Top 10 List	Bad Lieutenant	9th place	
Cahiers du Cinéma	2001	Annual Top 10 List	'R Xmas	10th place	
Cahiers du Cinéma	2012	Annual Top 10 List	Go Go Tales	7th place	
Cahiers du Cinéma	2012	Annual Top 10 List	4:44 Last Day on Earth	4th place	
Gotham Awards	1995	Filmmaker Award	—N/a	Won	
Independent Spirit Awards	1993	Best Director	Bad Lieutenant	Nominated	
Independent Spirit Awards	1997	Best Director	The Funeral	Nominated	
Premi Flaiano	2004	Career Award (Cinema)	—N/a	Won	
Yoga Awards	1998	Worst Director	The Blackout	Won	

=== Film festivals ===
Institution	Year	Category	Work	Result	Ref.
Avoriaz International Fantastic Film Festival	1982	Grand Prize	Ms .45	Nominated	
Berlin International Film Festival	1995	Golden Bear	The Addiction	Nominated	
Berlin International Film Festival	2020	Golden Bear	Siberia	Nominated	
Berlin International Film Festival	2024	Documentary Award	Turn in the Wound	Nominated	
Cannes Film Festival	1992	Un Certain Regard	Bad Lieutenant	Nominated	
Cannes Film Festival	1993	Palme d'Or	Body Snatchers	Nominated	
Cannes Film Festival	2001	Un Certain Regard	'R Xmas	Nominated	
Cannes Film Festival	2017	C.I.C.A.E. Award	Alive in France	Nominated	
Cannes Film Festival	2017	L'Œil d'or	Alive in France	Nominated	
Chicago International Film Festival	2001	Best Feature	'R Xmas	Nominated	
Deauville American Film Festival	1987	Critics Award	China Girl	Nominated	
Fancine	1997	Best Film	The Addiction	Won	
Fantasporto	1993	Best Film	Bad Lieutenant	Nominated	
Festival du nouveau cinéma	2020	People's Choice Award	Siberia	Nominated	
Film Festival Cologne	2019	Hollywood Reporter Award	Tommaso	Won	
Filmfest München	2015	Best International Film	Pasolini	Nominated	
Gijón International Film Festival	2019	Best Film	The Projectionist	Nominated	
Ischia Global Film & Music Festival	2026	Luchino Visconti Award	—N/a	Won	
Lisbon & Estoril Film Festival	2017	Tribute Award	—N/a	Won	
Lisbon & Estoril Film Festival	2019	Best Film	Tommaso	Won	
Lisbon & Estoril Film Festival	2019	Grand Jury Prize	Tommaso	Nominated	
Lisbon & Estoril Film Festival	2020	Best Film	Sportin' Life	Nominated	
Lisbon & Estoril Film Festival	2022	Best Film	Padre Pio	Nominated	
Locarno Film Festival	2011	Leopard of Honor	—N/a	Won	
Locarno Film Festival	2021	Best Film	Zeros and Ones	Nominated	
Locarno Film Festival	2021	Best Director	Zeros and Ones	Won	
Montreal World Film Festival	2007	Grand Prix des Amériques	Go Go Tales	Nominated	
Oldenburg International Film Festival	2007	German Independence Honorary Award	—N/a	Won	
San Sebastián International Film Festival	2014	Best Film	Pasolini	Nominated	
Seville European Film Festival	2019	Golden Giraldillo	Tommaso	Nominated	
Seville European Film Festival	2020	Golden Giraldillo	Siberia	Nominated	
Sitges Film Festival	1998	Best Film	New Rose Hotel	Nominated	
Sitges Film Festival	2008	Time-Machine Honorary Award	—N/a	Won	
Venice Film Festival	1993	Golden Lion	Dangerous Game	Nominated	
Venice Film Festival	1996	Golden Lion	The Funeral	Nominated	
Venice Film Festival	1998	Golden Lion	New Rose Hotel	Nominated	
Venice Film Festival	1998	Special Mention	New Rose Hotel	Won	
Venice Film Festival	2005	Golden Lion	Mary	Nominated	
Venice Film Festival	2005	Grand Jury Prize	Mary	Won	
Venice Film Festival	2011	Golden Lion	4:44 Last Day on Earth	Nominated	
Venice Film Festival	2014	Golden Lion	Pasolini	Nominated	
Venice Film Festival	2014	Queer Lion	Pasolini	Nominated	
Venice Film Festival	2020	Glory to the Filmmaker Award	—N/a	Won	
