= Paul Hipp =

American actor, musician, and filmmaker

- Born: July 16, 1963 (age 63); Philadelphia, Pennsylvania, U.S.
- Occupations: actor, singer, songwriter.
- Years active: 1987–present

Paul Hipp (born July 16, 1963) is an American actor, singer and songwriter.

== Early life ==
Paul Hipp was born in Philadelphia, Pennsylvania, and grew up in Warminster. After graduating high school, he moved to New York City and performed guitar for tips in Greenwich Village while studying acting with acting coach Mira Rostova and at HB Studio with William Hickey.

== Career ==
New York filmmaker Abel Ferrara saw one of Hipp's shows and asked him to audition for the role of Nino Valacci in his upcoming film China Girl. Hipp landed the role, and a decades-long collaboration began as he became a mainstay in Ferrara's core group of actors that includes Christopher Walken, Harvey Keitel and Willem Dafoe. During the filming of China Girl, Hipp wrote his first published song, “Midnight For You”, used as the film's end credit theme song.

Hipp then co-starred in the off-Broadway show A Minor Incident with Carole King. Hipp played “Midnight For You” for King, who later credited this song for inspiring her to come out of musical retirement. The two started writing songs together, and King often sat in with Hipp at his New York gigs. The two collaborated on songs for her Capitol Records release City Streets, including the song "I Can't Stop Thinking About You", which Hipp co-wrote and plays guitar and performs backing vocals on. A tour followed the LP release which featured Hipp joining King onstage for a duet on that song. While on stage with King at London's Royal Albert Hall, the producers of a new West End musical Buddy: The Buddy Holly Story saw Hipp. They invited him to audition for the role of Buddy Holly, and he was cast in the role. Buddy opened to rave reviews on October 12, 1989, at The Victoria Palace Theatre, and Hipp was nominated for the Laurence Olivier Award for Outstanding Performance by an Actor in a Musical. The following year, Hipp opened as 'Buddy' at Broadway's Shubert Theater in New York. He was nominated for a Tony Award for his performance and won a Theater World Award.

Hipp appeared in the films Fathers & Sons, with Jeff Goldblum, and as Jesus Christ opposite Harvey Keitel in Abel Ferrara's Bad Lieutenant, for which he also performed the title song, "Bad Lieutenant", with Ferrara. He also appeared as Gene Vincent opposite Donal Logue (as Eddie Cochran) in the play Be-Bop-A-Lula at Hollywood's Theater-Theater before returning to the London stage for the 25th anniversary revival of Hair at the Old Vic, in the role of Berger opposite John Barrowman as Claude. After the show closed, Hipp stayed in London, living in Notting Hill, studying painting, writing songs and performing at various venues in and around London.

Subsequent feature film roles include John Woo's Face Off, Waking The Dead, More Dogs Than Bones (in which Hipp and Joe Mantegna play a pair of bungling hit men), and Joe Odom in Midnight in the Garden of Good and Evil. On TV, he was a series regular on NBC's Three Sisters, among other appearances. In 2000, Hipp made his feature film directorial debut with Death of a Dog, which stars Julie Kessler and Edie Falco, executive produced by Ferrara. Hipp wrote the script, soundtrack and score for the film.

In 2005 Hipp played the half-man-half-woman circus performer Bert/Bertha Hagenbach on the second season of the HBO series Carnivàle. He co-starred in Two Tickets to Paradise (2006) and appeared in South of Pico (2007). He also co-starred in the Showtime pilot Manchild. During the same decade, was a guest star on the TV shows ER, Scrubs, CSI: NY, CSI: Miami, The Closer, Without a Trace and Ugly Betty.

In 2006, for The Huffington Post, Hipp wrote a blog with videos that included satirical musical parodies like his take on Johnny Cash's "Folsom Prison Blues" (with Dick Cheney singing about his hunting mishap) and The Beatles' "I Am the Walrus" (a take-off of George W. Bush's "I’m the Decider" quote). Some of the videos created for The Huffington Post were picked up by national news outlets.

Hipp had a recurring role in the F/X series Terriers and appeared in The Last Godfather. Ferrara directed him in 4:44 Last Day on Earth as well as 2014's Welcome to New York. Hipp contributed the opening and closing credit themes of this film. Hipp guest-starred as guitar-slinging minister Reverend Tim Tom in the ABC's comedy The Middle from 2009 until 2018. He co-starred in and co-wrote the Argentine-American film No Somos Animales.

== Music ==
Hipp wrote and produced several songs sung by Hilary Duff for the film War, Inc.

He wrote and recorded an album of songs culled from his work for The Huffington Post, called Blog of War. His song, We're Number 37 was circulated on social media and led to an appearance on The Dylan Ratigan Show.

Hipp released a CD of original music called The Remote Distance. Norman Lear appears in the video to "Happy Birthday to Me", the first single from the album.

He also released a CD of songs from and inspired by the film No Somos Animales, called Buenos Aires, in the fall of 2015.

== Discography ==
- Blog of War (2008)
- The Remote Distance (2015)
- Sometimes I'm Rudy (2017)

== Filmography ==
=== Film ===
Year	Title	Role	Notes
1987	China Girl	Nino	
1988	Sticky Fingers	Michael	
1992	Fathers & Sons	Doogy	
1992	Lethal Weapon 3	Doctor	
1992	Bad Lieutenant	Jesus	
1992	Bad Channels	Dan O'Dare	Direct-to-video
1996	The Funeral	Ghouly	
1997	Face/Off	Fitch	
1997	Midnight in the Garden of Good and Evil	Joe Odom	
1997	Vicious Circles	Dylan	
1998	Cleopatra's Second Husband	Robert Marrs	
1998	Another Day in Paradise	Richard Johnson	
2000	Waking the Dead	Danny Pierce	
2000	More Dogs Than Bones	Quinn	
2000	Death of a Dog	Dick	
2006	Two Tickets to Paradise	Jason Klein	
2007	South of Pico	Comma	
2010	The Last Godfather	Rocco	
2011	4:44 Last Day on Earth	Noah	
2013	We Are Not Animals	Rudy Maravilla	
2013	Jay & Silent Bob's Super Groovy Cartoon Movie!	Ring-Wearing Alien	Voice
2014	Welcome to New York	Guy	
2026	Michael	Bob Giraldi	Debut film

=== Television ===
Year	Title	Role	Notes
1987	The Equalizer	Jarret	Episode: "Inner View"
1988	Liberace: Behind the Music	Elvis Presley	Television film
1990	Nothing Like a Royal Show	Buddy Holly	Television film
1992	Tales from the Crypt	Nick Bosch	Episode: "On a Deadman's Chest"
1992	Parker Lewis Can't Lose	Harry	Episode: "Love Is Hell"
1993	The Hat Squad	McCauley	Episode: "Lifestyles of the Rich and Infamous"
1993	The Last Shot	Peter Tullis	Television film
1995	The Cosby Mysteries	Charlie Nevers	Episode: "Dial 'H' for Murder"
1996	Nash Bridges	Aaron Crow	Episode: "Vanishing Act"
1997	Pacific Blue	Lewis Abernathy	Episode: "Black Pearl"
1997	Men Behaving Badly	Simon	Episode: "Testing, Testing"
1997	Van Helsing Chronicles	Det. Ken Tugman	Television film
1998	Fantasy Island	Richard 'Freefall' Burns	Episode: "Pilot"
2000	The Chippendales Murder	Nick De Noia	Television film
2001	Cover Me	Lon Colomby	2 episodes
2001–2002	Three Sisters	Elliot Quinn	13 episodes
2002	Teenage Caveman	Shaman	Television film
2002	ER	Craig Turner	2 episodes
2005	CSI: Miami	Vince Fisher	Episode: "Game Over"
2005	Carnivàle	Bert Hagenbeck	3 episodes
2006	Scrubs	Marc Coleman	Episode: "My Chopped Liver"
2006	CSI: NY	William Mamet	Episode: "Stealing Home"
2006	The Closer	Dr. Woods	Episode: "Heroic Measures"
2006	Without a Trace	Detective Chris Pappas	Episode: "The Damage Done"
2007	Women's Murder Club	Miles Van Aiken	Episode: "Welcome to the Club"
2007	Girlfriends	Steve	Episode: "Snap Back"
2007	Manchild	Tom	Television film
2008	Ugly Betty	Phil Roth	Episode: "A Thousand Words Before Friday"
2009	Numbers	Gray McClaughlin	Episode: "Arrow of Time"
2010	Terriers	Barry	2 episodes
2010–2018	The Middle	Reverend TimTom	12 episodes
2013	Burn Notice	Al Sapienza	Episode: "Down Range"
2014	See Dad Run	Fred	Episode: "See Dad Roast the Toast"
2020	The Conners	Zach	2 episodes
