= Joe Delia =

American composer (born 1948)

- Born: Joseph Delia; October 11, 1948 (age 78); New York City, New York, U.S.
- Origin: Brooklyn, New York
- Genres: Blues rock; electronic; film score; avant garde
- Occupations: Singer; musician; songwriter; composer; arranger
- Instruments: Vocals; piano; guitar; synthesizer
- Years active: 1965–present
- Member of: Joe Delia & Thieves
- Website: www.joedelia-thieves.com

Joseph Delia (born October 11, 1948) is an American singer, musician, composer, arranger, and producer. He is the lead vocalist and keyboardist of the eponymous blues rock band Joe Delia & Thieves, after previously touring as a session and studio musician with David Johansen, Chuck Berry, Pat Benatar, and Stevie Wonder. He is also composer of film and television scores, best known for his career-spanning collaboration with director Abel Ferrara.

== Biography ==
=== The Bruthers ===
Born in Brooklyn, Delia began his career as a teenager in the early sixties, playing piano and singing with his group The Bruthers, who signed to RCA Records and released the 1966 single "Bad Way to Go". Managed by promoter Sid Bernstein, The Bruthers went on to work as a backup band on tours with rock 'n' roll artists Stevie Wonder, The Crystals, Chuck Berry, Little Eva and the Isley Brothers. "Bad Way to Go" was included on the compilation album, Pebbles, Volume 8. Bad Way to Go, compiling The Bruthers' sole single and some unreleased studio recordings, was released Sundazed Music in 2003.

=== Studio work ===
During the seventies, Delia studied composition, arranging, piano and bass violin under the likes of Don Sebesky, Eddie Gómez, and Jimmy Garrison. He was later chosen for the position of Composer in Residence at Sarah Lawrence College for two years under the direction of Shirley Kaplan and June Ekert. He eventually made his way into the studio scene in New York City, playing keyboards and writing arrangements for such diverse artists as Dusty Springfield, Grace Slick, Janis Ian, Pat Benatar, Helen Schneider, The Left Banke, Cory Daye and Engelbert Humperdinck, as well as writing jingles and scoring many industrial films. In Denmark, Delia is best known for his collaboration in the early 1980s with the popular Danish songwriter Kim Larsen when Larsen unsuccessfully tried to break into the American music industry. The eventual result was two albums credited to Kim Larsen and Jungle Dreams; the albums both sold well – but only in Denmark.

=== Film and television ===
Among Delia's earliest experiences in the music business were co-writing and singing for The Muppets' first appearance on The Ed Sullivan Show., composing jingles for major advertising campaigns, and co-composing a children's musical titled Lollapalooza which was produced by Joseph Papp and Bernard Gertsen for the New York Shakespeare festival.

After scoring two low-budget features for director Abel Ferrara during the 1970s, the two teamed up on a third film, Ms. 45 (1980). This working relationship continued for over twenty years, resulting in scores for most of Ferrara's body of work, including China Girl, King of New York, Dangerous Game, The Addiction, The Funeral, Subway Stories and The Blackout, on which Delia wrote the original score and collaborated on songs with rap artist Schoolly D. Delia appears as himself in A Short Film About the Long Career of Abel Ferrara, (which is included the Artisan DVD release of King of New York). Delia wrote music for a 1985 episode of Miami Vice, directed by Ferrara, in which Delia makes an uncredited appearance as a musician. Delia's collaboration with Ferrara came to a hiatus ever since the latter fired him during the making of New Rose Hotel (1998). He eventually reunited with Ferrara with the 2017 documentary Alive in France.

Other credits during the nineties include the HBO film The Enemy Within; and Drunks, starring Richard Lewis and Faye Dunaway. He also scored the television series Dellaventura, starring Danny Aiello, and scored the second season of the sci-fi series War of the Worlds. He composed music for twenty-six episodes of the BBC children's show Growing Up Wild/Madison's Adventures, was musical director for Richard Belzer's HBO and Showtime specials, and scored the Emmy Award-winning ten-part series Lost Civilizations for NBC/Time–Life.

Delia's later film scores include Jenniphr Goodman's comedy hit The Tao of Steve, released by Sony Classics; Fever, by Alex Winter; Ricky 6, written and directed by Peter Filardi; A Jersey Tale, by Michael Tolajian; My Best Friend's Wife, by Doug Finelli; Bitter Jester, produced by Richard Belzer; Bridget, by Amos Kollek; the jazz segments for the PBS film Partners of the Heart, by Bill Duke; and Carlito's Way: Rise to Power (a prequel to Brian De Palma's Carlito's Way) directed by Michael Bregman and executive produced by Martin Bregman. He composed theme music for a season of Pee Wee's Playhouse, while continuing to score feature films.

He composed for three seasons on the History Channel's most successful series Digging for the Truth, and wrote the score for the Discovery Channel series Weapon Masters.

Delia scored the PBS series Nova, the BBC web series Becoming Human, National Geographic Channel's "Pythons", and the PBS/National Geographic Channel joint productions Blue Holes and King Solomon's Mines.

=== Later bands and production work ===
Delia toured internationally with rock singer David Johansen, in the 1980s, producing and co-writing his solo album Sweet Revenge, and continued with the co-creation of the Buster Poindexter Show. Over the next five years he served as musical director and piano player for the live show, and is credited as musical director and co-arranger of the self-titled Buster Poindexter album which yielded the hit song "Hot Hot Hot".

Partnering with Scandinavian singing star Kim Larsen in the early eighties, Delia produced and co-wrote two albums that topped the pop charts throughout Europe, including a 1981 number one single in France ("Donnez Moi du Feu"), sold-out tours, and platinum albums in France, Sweden, Denmark and Norway.

In the early nineties, Delia produced a series of albums on BMG/Music Masters for jazz greats Stanley Turrentine, Freddie Hubbard, Jim Hall, Louis Bellson and his own album Scene of the Crime, which he produced with Max Weinberg (of Bruce Springsteen's E Street Band).

In 2010, Joe Delia toured with his new band Thieves, featuring Steven Roues, Billy Roues, Klyph Black, James Benard and Pj Delia.

== Discography ==
with The Bruthers

- "Bad Way to Go" / "Bad Love" (1966, RCA)
- Bad Way to Go (2003, Sundazed)

as Killer Joe

- Scene of the Crime (1991, Hightone)

as Joe Delia & Thieves

- Smoke & Mirrors (2011, Amusing Muse)

== Filmography ==
=== For Abel Ferrara ===
- 9 Lives of a Wet Pussy (1976)
- The Driller Killer (1979)
- Ms. 45 (1981)
- Fear City (1984) - Wrote two songs "New York Doll" and "Sucker City"
- Miami Vice (1985, television series) – 1 episode
- China Girl (1987)
- King of New York (1990)
- Bad Lieutenant (1992)
- Body Snatchers (1993)
- Dangerous Game (1993)
- The Addiction (1995)
- The Funeral (1996)
- The Blackout (1997)
- Alive in France (2017)
- Piazza Vittorio (2017)
- Tommaso (2019)
- Siberia (2020)
- Sportin' Life (2020)
- Zeros and Ones (2021)

=== For others ===
- Hoodlums (1980)
- Pee-wee's Playhouse (1986, television series) – 6 episodes
- Freeway (1988)
- Caged Fury (1989)
- War of the Worlds (1989–90, television series) – 10 episodes
- Body Trouble (1992)
- Eternal Champions (1993, video game)
- The Enemy Within (1994, television film)
- Drunks (1995)
- Twilight Highway (1995)
- Richard Belzer: Another Lone Nut (1997, television special)
- Dellaventura (1997, television series) – 13 episodes
- No Looking Back (1998)
- The Substitute 2: School's Out (1998)
- Fever (1999)
- Time Served (1999, television film)
- The Tao of Steve (2000)
- Ricky 6 (2000)
- Nova (2000–10, television series) – 6 episodes
- My Best Friend's Wife (2001)
- Bridget (2002)
- Bitter Jester (2003)
- Bought & Sold (2003)
- Carlito's Way: Rise to Power (2005)
- Digging for the Truth (2005–07, television series) – 26 episodes
- Weapon Masters (2008–09, television series) – 8 episodes
- National Geographic Explorer (2010, television series) – 1 episode
- National Lampoon's Dirty Movie (2011)
- National Lampoon's Snatched (2011)
- National Lampoon's Another Dirty Movie (2011)
- Art = (Love)² (2012)
- Santorini Blue (2013)
- Isabela: a Green Explorer Expedition (2016)
