= Universal's Cinematic Spectacular: 100 Years of Movie Memories =

Defunct fireworks show attraction

Universal Studios Florida
- Area: Lagoon
- Status: Removed
- Opening date: May 8, 2012
- Closing date: October 10, 2017
- Replaced: Universal 360: A Cinesphere Spectacular (2006–2011)
- Replaced by: Universal Orlando’s Cinematic Celebration (2018–2023)

Ride statistics
- Attraction type: Fireworks show
- Designer: Universal Creative
- Theme: Universal Pictures films
- Duration: 20 minutes
- Narrator: Morgan Freeman
- Music by: Brian Tyler; John Williams; John Debney; James Horner; Alan Silvestri; Hans Zimmer; Christopher Lennertz

Universal's Cinematic Spectacular: 100 Years of Movie Memories was a lagoon show at Universal Studios Florida. The attraction replaced Universal 360: A Cinesphere Spectacular in the park's center Lagoon. It featured famous scenes from Universal Pictures films projected onto large waterfall screens mixed with fountains and pyrotechnics. The show was narrated by actor Morgan Freeman, and was part of the 100th anniversary celebrations for Universal Studios throughout 2012. It opened on May 8, 2012. The music for the "spectacular" was a combination of scores from different films, with some original pieces composed by Brian Tyler, who also adapted Jerry Goldsmith's Universal Pictures fanfare for the studio's current logo and composed the "Universal Pictures 100th Anniversary Theme" that was also based on Goldsmith's fanfare. The closure of the show was announced on October 10, 2017. Universal stated that the show was replaced with a new night show named Universal Orlando's Cinematic Celebration, which opened on July 16, 2018, and closed on March 9, 2023 and it was replaced by a new show, Cinesational – A Symphonic Spectacular, which opened on June 14, 2024 and ran on select nights until August 25 of the same year.

== Soundtrack ==
- "Casper's Lullaby" and "One Last Wish" from Casper and "End Titles" from Apollo 13 by James Horner
- "Universal Pictures Fanfare" by Brian Tyler (arrangement) (originally composed by Jerry Goldsmith)
- "Main Theme" from The Last Starfighter by Craig Safan
- "Main Theme" from Back to the Future by Alan Silvestri
- "Max" from Cape Fear and "Prelude" from Psycho by Bernard Herrmann
- "Airport Chase," "Outtake Montage" and "Pulled Over" from Liar Liar by John Debney
- "The Wheat" and "The Battle" from Gladiator by Hans Zimmer
- "To the Stars" from Dragonheart by Randy Edelman
- "Escape/Chase/Saying Goodbye" from E.T. the Extra-Terrestrial by John Williams

== Movie montage set of films ==
=== Intro Sequence ===
- Apollo 13
- The Invisible Man
- Van Helsing
- Frankenstein
- Abbott and Costello Meet Frankenstein
- Dragonheart
- The Mummy (1999)
- The Mummy (1932)
- Dr. Seuss' How the Grinch Stole Christmas
- King Kong
- Creature from the Black Lagoon
- Jaws
- Dante's Peak
- The Birds
- Jurassic Park
- E.T. the Extra-Terrestrial
- The Breakfast Club
- Seabiscuit
- To Kill a Mockingbird
- Born on the Fourth of July
- Field of Dreams
- Les Misérables
- Pride & Prejudice
- Rear Window
- Ray
- The Blues Brothers
- The Incredible Hulk
- The Bourne Ultimatum
- Conan the Barbarian
- High Plains Drifter
- Scarface
- Backdraft
- The Nutty Professor
- Animal House
- Casino
- Waterworld
- American Graffiti
- Wanted
- Fast Five
- The Fast and the Furious
- Back to the Future

=== Heroes Sequence ===
- Elizabeth: The Golden Age
- Backdraft
- Ray
- Back to the Future
- The Fast and the Furious
- Fast & Furious 6
- Apollo 13
- Spartacus
- Scent of a Woman
- Erin Brockovich
- Inglourious Basterds
- Born on the Fourth of July
- Back to the Future Part II
- Back to the Future Part III
- Scott Pilgrim vs. the World
- Peter Pan
- Hot Fuzz
- Battleship
- Waterworld
- The River Wild
- Contraband
- Saboteur
- Hellboy II: The Golden Army
- Out of Africa
- Winchester '73
- My Little Chickadee
- The Spoilers
- Wanted
- Blue Crush
- Fast & Furious
- Friday Night Lights
- The Express: The Ernie Davis Story
- Dune
- Cinderella Man
- Earthquake
- Inside Man
- Munich
- Milk
- Dragon: The Bruce Lee Story
- Conan the Barbarian
- The Mummy Returns
- The Bourne Identity
- The Bourne Ultimatum
- The Bourne Supremacy

=== Horror Sequence ===
- Van Helsing
- Psycho
- The Wolfman
- Red Dragon
- Dream House
- Dead Silence
- The Strangers
- Dracula
- The Mummy (1932)
- Frankenstein
- The Mummy (1999)
- The Invisible Man
- Bride of Chucky
- An American Werewolf in London
- Cape Fear
- Rear Window
- Creature from the Black Lagoon
- The Skeleton Key
- Hellboy II: The Golden Army
- The Thing
- The Thing (2011)
- Bordello of Blood
- The People Under the Stairs
- Halloween II
- Jaws
- Phantom of the Opera
- Bride of Frankenstein
- Jurassic Park
- Army of Darkness
- Tremors
- The Birds
- The Unborn
- Shaun of the Dead
- White Noise
- Dawn of the Dead
- Slither
- Drag Me to Hell

=== Laughter Sequence ===
- Bruce Almighty
- Meet the Fockers
- The Nutty Professor
- Babe
- The Big Lebowski
- American Pie
- Intolerable Cruelty
- Bridesmaids
- Fast Times at Ridgemont High
- Fletch
- Meet the Parents
- The Lorax
- Harvey
- Hop
- Harry and the Hendersons
- Despicable Me
- The 40-Year-Old Virgin
- Liar Liar
- Car Wash
- Knocked Up
- Kindergarten Cop
- Baby Mama
- Along Came Polly
- Uncle Buck
- Kicking and Screaming
- Role Models
- Happy Gilmore
- Welcome Home Roscoe Jenkins
- The Jerk
- Bridget Jones: The Edge of Reason
- The Break-Up
- Mamma Mia!
- Duck Soup
- Beethoven
- The Flintstones
- Buck Privates
- Smokey and the Bandit
- Fried Green Tomatoes
- Ted
- Get Him to the Greek
- Mallrats
- Bring It On
- The Blues Brothers
- The Breakfast Club
- Parenthood
- Johnny English
- Dr. Seuss' How the Grinch Stole Christmas
- Bean
- Nanny McPhee

=== Good vs. Evil Sequence ===
- Gladiator
- Munich
- Public Enemies
- Spartacus
- Jarhead
- Snow White and the Huntsman
- Robin Hood
- Les Misérables
- All Quiet on the Western Front
- The Mummy Returns
- The Incredible Hulk
- Hellboy II: The Golden Army
- King Kong
- Elizabeth: The Golden Age
- Inglourious Basterds
- Green Zone
- Fast & Furious 6
- Battleship

=== Triumph Sequence ===
- U-571
- Definitely, Maybe
- A Beautiful Mind
- The Pianist
- The Deer Hunter
- Les Misérables
- The Express: The Ernie Davis Story
- On Golden Pond
- Children of Men
- Schindler's List
- Seabiscuit
- Billy Elliot
- The Hurricane
- 8 Mile
- Love Actually
- Coal Miner's Daughter
- Out of Africa
- Field of Dreams
- Sixteen Candles
- Elizabeth: The Golden Age

=== Romance Sequence ===
- Shakespeare in Love
- The Egg and I
- Notting Hill
- Pillow Talk
- Bride of Frankenstein
- Charade
- Vertigo
- Leap Year
- Atonement

=== Outro Sequence ===
- Jurassic Park
- The Lost World: Jurassic Park
- King Kong
- The Mummy (1999)
- Dragonheart
- Gladiator
- Schindler's List
- Far and Away
- American Graffiti
- It's Complicated
- Lost in Translation
- Spy Game
- Gorillas in the Mist
- To Kill a Mockingbird
- Brokeback Mountain
- Frost/Nixon
- Patch Adams
- Bruce Almighty
- Scent of a Woman
- Babe
- Animal House
- E.T. the Extra-Terrestrial
- Apollo 13
- Despicable Me
- A Beautiful Mind
- The Motorcycle Diaries
- Les Misérables
- Mamma Mia!
- Fast Five
- American Wedding
- The Sting
- Jaws
- Back to the Future

== See also ==
- 2012 in amusement parks
