= List of highest-grossing live-action comedy films =

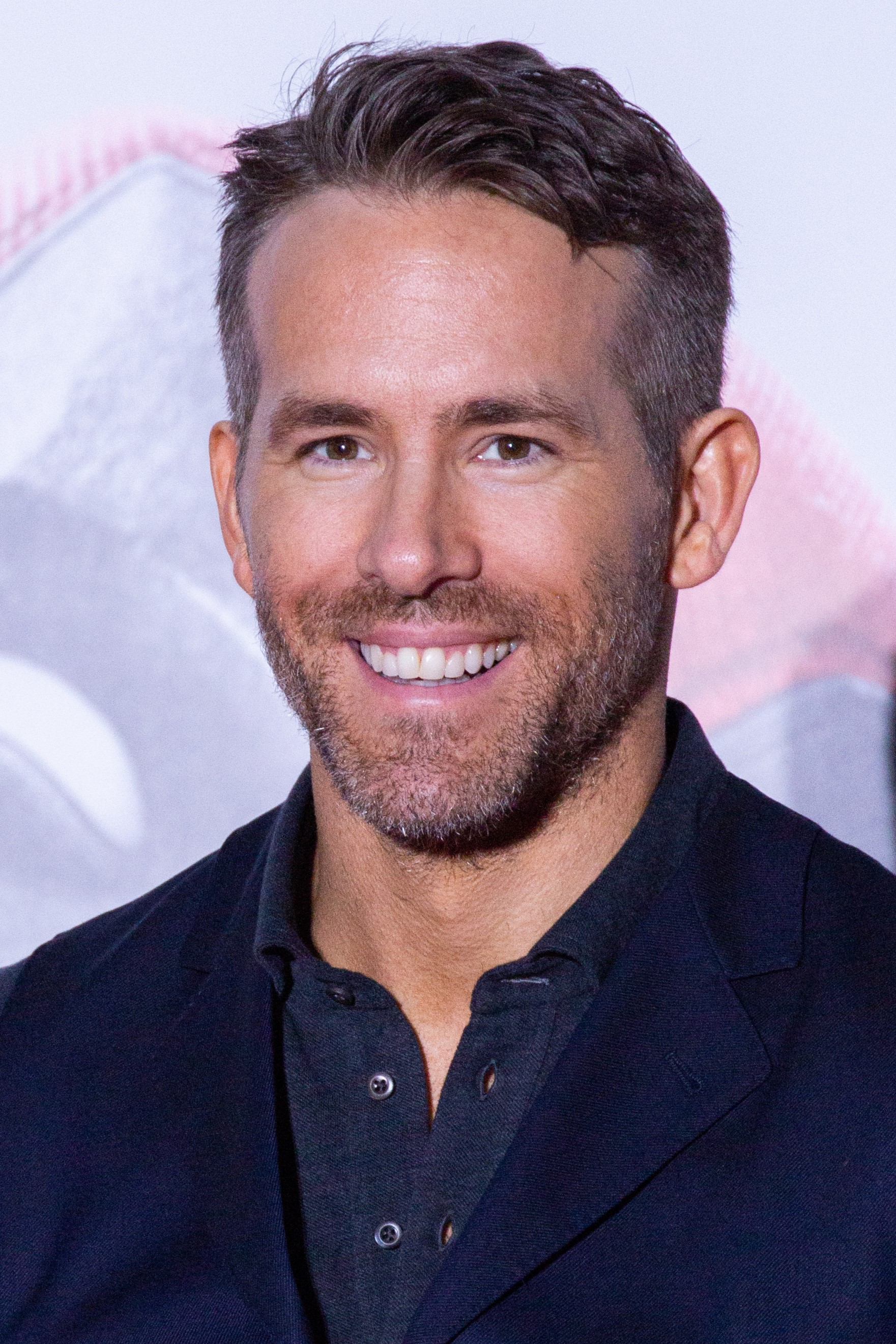
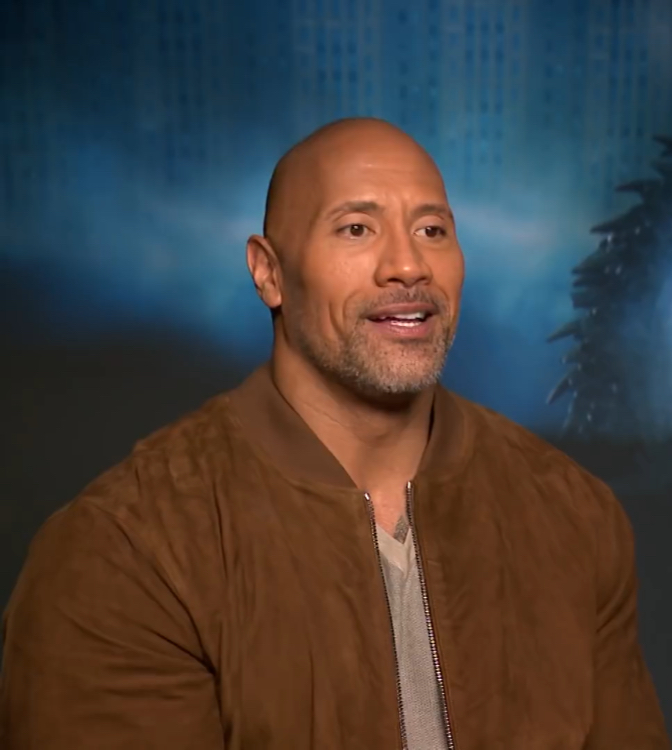
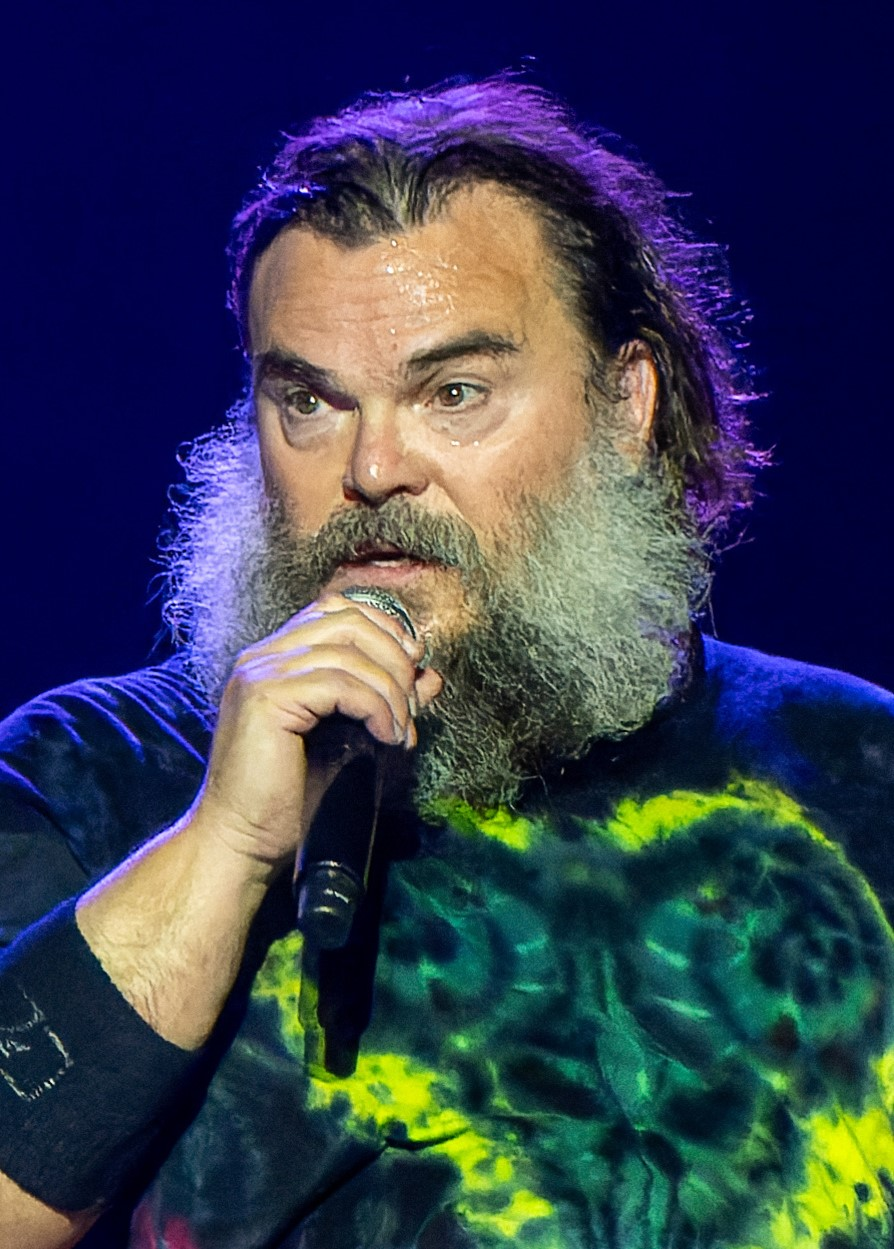
Ryan Reynolds (left), Dwayne Johnson (center), and Jack Black (right) each star in three of the ten highest‑grossing live-action comedy films (both pictured 2018, the latter in 2023).

This is a list of the highest-grossing live-action comedy films. The list includes comedy films that are either live-action or hybrid live-action/animated, but not fully animated. For fully animated comedy films, see the list of highest-grossing animated films.

== Highest-grossing comedy films ==
The following is a list of the top 50 highest-grossing live-action comedy films of all time. Barbie, Deadpool & Wolverine and Aladdin are among the top 50 highest-grossing films of all time. The majority of films released after 2000, with all films released after 1987. 2018 and 2024 are the most frequent years, with five films each on the list. Deadpool and Detective Chinatown are the most frequent franchises, with three films each.

† Background shading indicates films playing in the week commencing 23 October 2026 in theaters around the world.

Rank	Film	Year	Gross	Ref
1	Barbie	2023	$1,447,038,421	
2	Deadpool & Wolverine	2024	$1,338,073,645	
3	Aladdin	2019	$1,050,693,953	
4	Jumanji: Welcome to the Jungle	2017	$962,544,585	
5	A Minecraft Movie	2025	$961,187,780	
6	Hi, Mom	2021	$841,674,419	
7	Jumanji: The Next Level	2019	$801,693,929	
8	Deadpool 2	2018	$785,046,920	
9	Deadpool	2016	$783,112,979	
10	Hobbs & Shaw	2019	$760,732,926	
11	The Devil Wears Prada 2 †	2026	$693,255,651	
12	Detective Chinatown 3	2021	$686,257,563	
13	Men in Black 3	2012	$654,213,485	
14	Hancock	2008	$629,443,428	
15	Mamma Mia!	2008	$610,002,542	
16	Men in Black	1997	$589,390,539	
17	The Hangover Part II	2011	$586,764,305	
18	Night at the Museum	2006	$574,482,479	
19	The Mermaid	2016	$553,810,228	
20	Ted	2012	$549,368,315	
21	Detective Chinatown 2	2018	$544,185,156	
22	Meet the Fockers	2004	$522,657,936	
23	Detective Chinatown 1900	2025	$508,922,947	
24	Sonic the Hedgehog 3	2024	$492,162,604	
25	Mr. & Mrs. Smith	2005	$487,287,646	
26	The Intouchables	2011	$484,873,045	
27	Bruce Almighty	2003	$484,592,874	
28	YOLO	2024	$479,597,304	
29	Home Alone	1990	$477,063,114	
30	The Hangover	2009	$469,310,836	
31	Pretty Woman	1990	$463,406,248	
32	Successor	2024	$460,400,000	
33	Moon Man	2022	$460,237,662	
34	Detective Pikachu	2019	$451,453,444	
35	Dying to Survive	2018	$451,183,391	
36	Beetlejuice Beetlejuice	2024	$451,100,435	
37	Men in Black II	2002	$445,135,288	
38	Mrs. Doubtfire	1993	$441,286,195	
39	Bad Boys for Life	2020	$426,505,244	
40	Sex and the City	2008	$418,765,321	
41	Night at the Museum: Battle of the Smithsonian	2009	$413,106,170	
42	Sonic the Hedgehog 2	2022	$405,421,518	
43	Mamma Mia! Here We Go Again	2018	$395,044,706	
44	Back to the Future	1985	$389,053,797	
45	Monster Hunt	2015	$387,053,506	
46	What Women Want	2000	$374,111,707	
47	Hitch	2005	$371,594,210	
48	There's Something About Mary	1998	$369,884,651	
49	My Big Fat Greek Wedding	2002	$368,744,044	
50	Hello Mr. Billionaire	2018	$366,961,907	

== Biggest opening weekends ==
This list charts films the biggest worldwide openings for comedy films. Since films do not open on Fridays in many markets, the 'opening' is taken to be the gross between the first day of release and the first Sunday following the movie's release. Figures prior to the year 2002 are not available. Country-by-country variations in release dates are not taken into account.

Rank	Film	Year	Opening weekend	Ref
1	Deadpool & Wolverine	2024	$444,300,000	
2	Detective Chinatown 3	2021	$399,682,005	
3	Barbie	2023	$356,300,000	
4	A Minecraft Movie	2025	$301,000,000	
5	Deadpool 2	2018	$300,386,357	
6	The Mermaid	2016	$275,100,000	
7	Deadpool	2016	$264,711,361	
8	Aladdin	2019	$234,700,000	
9	The Devil Wears Prada 2	2026	$233,600,000	
10	Men in Black 3	2012	$202,000,000	
11	Hi, Mom	2021	$195,000,000	
12	Monster Hunt 2	2018	$191,163,448	
13	Hancock	2008	$182,500,000	
14	Hobbs & Shaw	2019	$179,000,000	
15	The Hangover Part II	2011	$178,800,000	
16	Detective Pikachu	2019	$161,000,000	
17	Detective Chinatown 2	2018	$156,597,041	
18	Dying to Survive	2018	$152,163,428	
19	Once Upon a Time in the Middle East	2026	$148,000,000	
20	Sonic the Hedgehog 2	2022	$141,000,000	
21	Detective Chinatown 1900	2025	$133,946,485	
22	Jumanji: The Next Level	2019	$112,600,000	
23	Monster Hunt	2015	$109,000,000	
24	Men in Black: International	2019	$103,700,000	
25	Night at the Museum: Battle of the Smithsonian	2009	$103,200,000	
26	Sonic the Hedgehog	2020	$101,000,000	
27	Jumanji: Welcome to the Jungle	2017	$100,000,000	
28	Mamma Mia! Here We Go Again	2018	$77,852,180	
29	Kung Fu Soccer	2026	$73,600,000	
30	Rush Hour 2	2001	$70,670,104	
31	Bruce Almighty	2003	$67,953,330	
32	Sonic the Hedgehog 3	2024	$60,102,146	
33	Men in Black II	2002	$57,607,798	
34	Sex and the City	2008	$57,038,404	
35	Ted	2012	$54,415,205	
36	Men in Black	1997	$51,068,455	
37	Mr. & Mrs. Smith	2005	$50,342,878	

== Box office ticket sales ==
The following is a list of comedy films by estimated tickets sold at the worldwide box office. The following films sold more than 50 million tickets worldwide.

Film	Year	Ticket sales (est.)	Ref
Shaolin Temple	1982	500,994,065	(Note: Shaolin Temple: China – 500,000,000; Hong Kong – 700,000; South Korea – 294,065)
Sesame Official (Qi pin zhi ma guan)	1980	500,000,000	
Caravan	1971	319,000,000	
Sholay (Embers)	1975	250,021,329	(Note: Sholay: Up until 1985 – 250 million; Sholay released in following territories up until 1985 – India, Brazil, Portugal, United States, Soviet Union (where it sold 60 million tickets); European re-releases (2005–2015) – 21,329)
Awaara (The Vagabond)	1951	230,100,000	(Note: Awaara: India – 30 million; China – 100 million; Soviet Union – 100 million; Turkey – 100,000 (opening))
The Flying Son-in-Law (Fei lai de nü xu)	1982	199,500,000	
Jumanji: Welcome to the Jungle	2017	188,400,000	
Aladdin	2019	161,600,000	
Deadpool	2016	156,900,000	
Barbie	2023	152,200,000	
Deadpool 2	2018	152,100,000	
Disco Dancer	1982	135,000,000	(Note: Disco Dancer admissions: India – 15 million; Soviet Union – 120 million)
Some Like It Hot	1959	134,828,303	
Deadpool & Wolverine	2024	127,100,000	
The Sting	1973	123,048,854	(Note: The Sting: United States and United Kingdom – 100,229,200; France, Germany, Italy, Spain – 22,487,149; South Korea – 329,335; Czech Republic, Denmark, Slovakia, Sweden, Switzerland – 3,170)
Jumanji: The Next Level	2019	122,600,000	
Hi, Mom	2021	121,002,451	
Hobbs & Shaw	2019	116,800,000	
Detective Chinatown 2	2018	105,500,000	
Bobby	1973	105,400,000	(Note: Bobby admissions: India – 42.5 million; Soviet Union – 62.9 million)
Men in Black	1997	96,543,325	(Note: Men in Black admissions: United States and Canada – 54,616,700; Europe – 33,507,046; Japan – 6,000,000; Brazil – 1,757,473; South Korea – 662,106)
Detective Chinatown 3	2021	95,136,767	
The Mermaid	2016	92,766,699	
Back to the Future	1985	90,184,478	(Note: Back to the Future admissions: United States and Denmark – 59,434,344; France, Germany, Italy, Spain – 12,592,872; United Kingdom – 9,719,533; Japan – 8,078,180; South Korea (Seoul City) – 343,292; Other European territories (2011–2018) – 16,257)
Dying to Survive	2018	89,042,600	
Moscow Does Not Believe in Tears	1980	85,020,845	
A Minecraft Movie	2025	82,600,000	
Ghostbusters	1984	82,375,218	(Note: Ghostbusters admissions: United States and Canada – 71,173,700; France, Germany, Italy – 8,046,600; Denmark and Spain – 2,763,555; South Korea (Seoul City) – 344,420; United Kingdom, Belgium, Netherlands, Sweden (2002–2018) – 46,943)
Beverly Hills Cop	1984	82,060,394	(Note: Beverly Hills Cop admissions: United States, Spain, Denmark – 69,103,402; France, Germany, Italy – 7,499,810; United Kingdom – 3,000,000; Japan – 2,200,000; South Korea (Seoul City) – 257,182)
Home Alone	1990	81,491,808	(Note: Home Alone admissions: United States, Canada, Spain – 70,521,419; France, Germany, Italy – 10,032,435; South Korea (Seoul City) – 869,820; United Kingdom, Belgium, Romania, Switzerland (1996–2018) – 68,134)
Maine Pyar Kiya	1989	79,700,000	
The Diamond Arm	1969	76,700,751	
Mamma Mia! Here We Go Again	2018	76,600,000	
Kidnapping, Caucasian Style	1967	76,540,000	
Moon Man	2022	74,628,237	
Detective Chinatown 1900	2025	74,330,123	
Hum Aapke Hain Koun..!	1994	73,962,000	
Men in Black 3	2012	73,500,000	
Mera Naam Joker (My Name is Joker)	1970	73,100,000	
YOLO	2024	72,584,067	
Coolie	1983	70,000,000	
Operation Y and Shurik's Other Adventures	1965	69,600,000	
Hancock	2008	68,703,429	(Note: Hancock admissions: United States – 31,747,400; Brazil, China, Russia, Ukraine, United Kingdom – 15,784,552; France – 3,078,077; Other European countries – 12,769,882; South Korea – 2,723,518; Japan – 2,600,000)
Kung Fu Soccer †	2026	67,877,500	
Detective Pikachu	2019	66,600,000	
Monster Hunt	2015	65,689,800	
Gentlemen of Fortune	1971	65,000,000	
Ted	2012	64,500,000	
Afonya	1975	62,200,000	
Men in Black II	2002	60,951,117	(Note: Men in Black II admissions: United States and Canada – 33,915,900; United Kingdom – 5,100,000; Other European countries – 18,084,027; Japan – 3,000,000; South Korea – 851,190)
Once Upon a Time in the Middle East †	2026	60,395,600	
Monster Hunt 2	2018	58,389,300	
The Devil Wears Prada 2 †	2026	57,600,000	
The Hangover	2009	56,600,000	
Night at the Museum	2006	52,700,000	
Rush Hour 2	2001	52,517,920	(Note: Rush Hour 2 admissions: United States – 42,000,000; Germany and France – 3,759,907; United Kingdom – 2,700,000; Other European countries – 2,233,662; Japan – 1,400,000; Seoul City (South Korea) – 424,351)
Ganga Jamna	1961	52,500,000	
Muqaddar Ka Sikandar	1978	52,500,000	
Night at the Museum: Battle of the Smithsonian	2009	50,700,000	
The Intouchables	2011	50,200,000	

== Timeline of highest-grossing films ==
At least 20 films have held the title of highest-grossing comedy film.

Year	Title	Record-setting gross	Ref
1924	The Navigator	$680,406	
1925	The Gold Rush	$4,000,000	
1931	City Lights	$4,250,000	
1939	Mr. Smith Goes to Washington	$9,000,000	
1944	The Miracle of Morgan's Creek	$9,000,000	
1945	The Bells of St. Mary's	$21,337,978	
1951	Awaara (The Vagabond)	$30,660,000	(Note: See Awaara § Box office)
1959	Some Like It Hot	$49,200,000	
1963	It's a Mad, Mad, Mad, Mad World	$60,000,000	
1967	The Graduate	$104,675,450	
1972	The Way of the Dragon (Return of the Dragon)	$130,000,000	
1973	The Sting	$257,000,000	
1977	Smokey and the Bandit	$300,000,000	
1984	Beverly Hills Cop	$316,360,478	
1985	Back to the Future	$381,109,762	
1990	Home Alone	$476,684,675	
2003	Bruce Almighty	$484,592,874	
2004	Meet the Fockers	$522,657,936	
2006	Night at the Museum	$579,446,407	
2017	Jumanji: Welcome to the Jungle	$962,544,585	
2019	Aladdin	$1,050,693,953	
2023	Barbie	$1,447,038,421	

== Highest-grossing films by year ==
The following is a list of highest-grossing comedy films by year. Both Deadpool and Meet the Parents tops the list more than any other franchise, with all three films on the list.

A film has made more than $100 million every year since 1983, over $250 million every year since 2021, and over $500-$750 million every year since 2022.

In 2023, Barbie was the top-grossing overall film of the year.

Year	Film	Worldwide gross	Budget	Ref
2026	The Devil Wears Prada 2 †	$690,296,671	$100,000,000	
2025	A Minecraft Movie	$961,187,780	$150,000,000	
2024	Deadpool & Wolverine	$1,338,073,382	$200,000,000	
2023	Barbie	$1,447,038,421	$145,000,000	
2022	Moon Man	$460,237,662	$8,200,000	
2021	Hi, Mom	$841,674,419	$59,000,000	
2020	Bad Boys for Life	$426,505,244	$90,000,000	
2019	Aladdin	$1,050,693,953	$183,000,000	
2018	Deadpool 2	$785,896,609 ($734,546,611)	$110,000,000	
2017	Jumanji: Welcome to the Jungle	$962,544,585	$90,000,000	
2016	Deadpool	$782,836,791	$58,000,000	
2015	Monster Hunt	$387,053,506	$56,000,000	
2014	Night at the Museum: Secret of the Tomb	$363,204,635	$127,000,000	
2013	Grown Ups 2	$246,984,278	$80,000,000	
2012	Men in Black III	$654,213,485	$225,000,000	
2011	Pirates of the Caribbean: On Stranger Tides	$1,045,713,802	$250,000,000	
2010	Meet the Parents: Little Fockers	$310,650,585	$110,000,000	
2009	The Hangover	$469,310,836	$35,000,000	
2008	Hancock	$629,443,428	$150,000,000	
2007	Pirates of the Caribbean: At World's End	$961,691,209	$300,000,000	
2006	Night at the Museum	$574,481,229	$110,000,000	
2005	Mr. & Mrs. Smith	$487,287,646	$110,000,000	
2004	Meet the Fockers	$522,657,936	$80,000,000	
2003	Bruce Almighty	$484,592,874	$81,000,000	
2002	Men in Black II	$445,135,288	$140,000,000	
2001	Ocean's Eleven	$450,728,529	$85,000,000	
2000	What Women Want	$374,111,707	$70,000,000	
1999	Austin Powers: The Spy Who Shagged Me	$313,701,294	$33,000,000	
1998	There's Something About Mary	$369,884,651	$23,000,000	
1997	Men in Black	$589,390,539	$90,000,000	
1996	The Nutty Professor	$273,961,019	$54,000,000	
1995	Jumanji	$262,821,940	$65,000,000	
1994	The Mask	$351,583,407	$23,000,000	
1993	Mrs. Doubtfire	$441,286,195	$25,000,000	
1992	Home Alone 2: Lost in New York	$358,994,850	$28,000,000	
1991	City Slickers	$179,000,000	$27,000,000	
1990	Home Alone	$477,063,114	$18,000,000	
1989	Look Who's Talking	$296,999,813	$7,500,000	
1988	Coming to America	$288,752,301	$36,000,000	
1987	Three Men and a Baby	$240,000,000	$11,000,000	
1986	Crocodile Dundee	$328,203,506	TBA	
1985	Back to the Future	$389,053,797 ($381,109,762)	$19,000,000	
1984	Beverly Hills Cop	$316,360,478	$13,000,000	
1983	Trading Places	$90,404,800	$15,000,000	
1982	Tootsie	$241,000,000	$21,000,000	
1981	The Cannonball Run	$160,000,000	$16,000,000	
1980	9 to 5	$103,290,500	$10,000,000	
1979	The Jerk	$100,000,000	$4,000,000	
1978	Animal House	$141,607,219 ($120,098,342)	TBA	
1977	Smokey and the Bandit	$300,000,000	$3,500,000	
1976	The Pink Panther Strikes Again	$75,000,000	TBA	
1975	The Rocky Horror Picture Show	$115,322,757	$1,400,000	
1974	Blazing Saddles	$119,617,265	TBA	
1973	The Sting	$257,000,000	$5,500,000	
1972	The Way of the Dragon (Return of the Dragon)	$130,000,000	$130,000	
1971	Bedknobs and Broomsticks	$17,871,174	$6,500,000	
1970	M*A*S*H	$81,600,000	$3,500,000	
1969	The Love Bug	$51,264,022	$5,000,000	
1968	Funny Girl	$58,707,416	TBA	
1967	The Graduate	$105,015,008 ($104,675,450)	TBA	
1966	The Russians Are Coming, the Russians Are Coming	$21,693,114	$3,900,000	
1965	Those Magnificent Men in Their Flying Machines	$31,111,111	TBA	
1964	My Fair Lady	$72,632,653	$17,000,000	
1963	It's a Mad, Mad, Mad, Mad World	$60,000,000	$9,400,000	
1962	That Touch of Mink	$12,923,077	TBA	
1961	The Absent-Minded Professor	$25,300,000	TBA	
1960	The Apartment	$24,000,000	$3,000,000	
1959	Some Like It Hot	$49,200,000	$2,900,000	
1958	Auntie Mame	$23,200,000	$2,900,000	
1957	Will Success Spoil Rock Hunter?	$4,900,000	$1,050,000	
1956	The Teahouse of the August Moon	$8,925,000	$3,926,000[	
1955	Mister Roberts	$21,200,000	$2,300,000	
1954	Sabrina	$4,000,000	TBA	
1953	How to Marry a Millionaire	$8,000,000	$1,300,000	
1952	Singin' in the Rain	$7,241,009	$2,540,000	
1951	Awaara (The Vagabond)	$30,660,000	?	
1950	Father of the Bride	$6,084,000	$1,215,000	
1949	I Was a Male War Bride	$4,100,000	TBA	
1948	The Paleface	$4,500,000	$2,000,000	
1947	Welcome Stranger	$6,100,000	$1,961,000	
1946	Margie	$4,100,000	$1,680,000	
1945	The Bells of St. Mary's	$21,337,978	$1,300,000	
1944	The Miracle of Morgan's Creek	$9,000,000	$775,000	
1943	Thousands Cheer	$5,886,000	$1,568,000	
1942	Road to Morocco	$3,800,000	TBA	
1941	Ball of Fire	$2,641,000	TBA	
1940	The Great Dictator	$5,000,000	$2,200,000	
1939	Mr. Smith Goes to Washington	$9,000,000	TBA	
1938	You Can't Take It with You	$2,137,575	$1,644,736	
1937	The Awful Truth	$3,000,000	TBA	
1936	Follow the Fleet	$2,727,000	$747,000	
1935	Top Hat	$3,200,000	$609,000	
1934	It Happened One Night	$3,200,000	$325,000	
1933	I'm No Angel	$2,250,000	$225,000	
1932	Movie Crazy	$1,439,000	$675,353	
1931	City Lights	$4,250,000	TBA	
1930	Animal Crackers	$3,100,000	TBA	
1929	Welcome Danger	$3,000,000	$979,828	
1928	The Circus	$3,800,000	TBA	
1927	The General	$474,264	TBA	
1925	The Gold Rush	$4,000,000	$923,000	
1924	The Navigator	$680,406	$385,000	

== Highest-grossing film franchises ==
The following is a list of highest grossing film series. Deadpool sits atop the list with $2.9 billion and has the best average with over $968 million per film.

Highest-grossing comedy film franchises and film series^{[§]}(The films in each franchise can be viewed by selecting "show".)

Rank	Series	Total worldwide gross	No. of films	Average of films	Highest-grossing film

1	Deadpool	$2,906,582,409	3	$968,860,803	Deadpool & Wolverine ($1,338,073,645)
1	Deadpool & Wolverine (2024)	$1,338,073,645			
2	Deadpool 2 (2018)	$785,896,609			
3	Deadpool (2016)	$782,612,155			

2	Jumanji	$2,090,505,336	4	$522,626,334	Welcome to the Jungle ($962,544,585)
1	Welcome to the Jungle (2017)	$962,544,585			
2	The Next Level (2019)	$800,059,707			
3	Jumanji (1995)	$262,821,940			
4	Zathura (2005)	$65,079,104			

3	Men in Black	$1,945,946,498	4	$486,486,625	Men in Black 3 ($624,026,776)
1	Men in Black 3 (2012)	$654,213,485			
2	Men in Black (1997)	$589,390,539			
3	Men in Black II (2002)	$441,818,803			
4	International (2019)	$253,890,701			
5	Men in Black II/Spider-Man (combo)	$6,632,970			

4	Detective Chinatown	$1,865,208,601	4	$466,302,150	Detective Chinatown 3 ($686,257,563)
1	Detective Chinatown 3 (2021)	$686,257,563			
2	Detective Chinatown 2 (2018)	$544,185,156			
3	Detective Chinatown 1900 (2025)	$508,922,947			
4	Detective Chinatown (2015)	$125,842,935			

5	The Hangover	$1,416,248,289	3	$472,082,763	Part II ($586,764,305)
1	Part II (2011)	$586,764,305			
2	The Hangover (2009)	$467,483,912			
3	Part III (2013)	$362,000,072			

6	Night at the Museum	$1,350,792,034	3	$450,264,011	Night at the Museum ($574,481,229)
1	Night at the Museum (2006)	$574,481,229			
2	Night at the Museum: Battle of the Smithsonian (2009)	$413,106,170			
3	Night at the Museum: Secret of the Tomb (2014)	$363,204,635			

7	Sonic the Hedgehog	$1,218,538,148	3	$406,179,383	Sonic the Hedgehog 3 ($492,162,604)
1	Sonic the Hedgehog 3 (2024)	$492,162,604			
2	Sonic the Hedgehog 2 (2022)	$405,421,518			
3	Sonic the Hedgehog (2020)	$320,954,026			

8	Meet the Parents	$1,163,752,566	3	$387,917,522	Meet the Fockers ($522,657,936)
1	Meet the Fockers (2004)	$522,657,936			
2	Meet the Parents (2000)	$330,444,045			
3	Little Fockers (2010)	$310,650,585			

9
Ghostbusters
$1,127,110,415
5
$225,422,083
Ghostbusters (1984) ($295,212,467)

	Original series	$901,794,746	4	$225,448,687	Ghostbusters (1984) ($295,212,467)
1	Ghostbusters (1984)	$295,212,467			
2	Ghostbusters II (1989)	$215,394,738			
3	Frozen Empire (2024)	$195,741,452			
4	Afterlife (2021)	$195,446,089			

Answer the Call (2016)	$229,147,509

10	Scary Movie †	$1,126,827,625	6	$187,804,604	Scary Movie ($278,019,771)
1	Scary Movie (2000)	$278,019,771			
2	Scary Movie (2026) †	$230,272,595			
3	Scary Movie 3 (2003)	$220,673,217			
4	Scary Movie 4 (2006)	$178,262,620			
5	Scary Movie 2 (2001)	$141,220,678			
6	Scary Movie V (2013)	$78,378,744			

11	Kingsman	$1,043,378,686	4	$260,844,672	The Secret Service ($414,351,546)
1	The Secret Service (2015)	$414,351,546			
2	The Golden Circle (2017)	$410,902,662			
3	The King's Man (2021)	$125,897,478			
4	Argylle (2024)	$92,227,000			

12	The Devil Wears Prada †	$1,016,989,504	2	$508,494,752	The Devil Wears Prada 2 ($690,283,389)
1	The Devil Wears Prada 2 (2026)	$690,283,389			
2	The Devil Wears Prada (2006)	$326,706,115			

13	Mamma Mia!	$1,005,047,248	2	$502,523,624	Mamma Mia! ($610,002,542)
1	Mamma Mia! (2008)	$610,002,542			
2	Here We Go Again! (2018)	$395,044,706			

14	American Pie	$989,475,386	4	$247,368,847	American Pie 2 ($287,553,595)
1	American Pie 2 (2001)	$287,553,595			
2	American Pie (1999)	$235,483,004			
3	American Reunion (2012)	$234,989,584			
4	American Wedding (2003)	$231,449,203			

15	Back to the Future	$970,381,382	3	$323,460,461	Back to the Future ($389,053,797)
1	Back to the Future (1985)	$389,053,797			
2	Part II (1989)	$331,950,002			
3	Part III (1990)	$244,527,583			
4	Day (2015)	$4,850,000			

16	Home Alone	$915,140,479	3	$305,046,826	Home Alone ($476,684,675)
1	Home Alone (1990)	$477,063,114			
2	Lost in New York (1992)	$358,994,850			
3	Home Alone 3 (1997)	$79,082,515			

17	Rush Hour	$849,834,929	3	$283,278,310	Rush Hour 2 ($347,425,832)
1	Rush Hour 2 (2001)	$347,425,832			
2	Rush Hour 3 (2007)	$258,022,233			
3	Rush Hour (1998)	$244,386,864			

18	Ted	$763,103,098	2	$381,551,549	Ted ($549,368,315)
1	Ted (2012)	$549,368,315			
2	Ted 2 (2015)	$213,734,783			

19	Monster Hunt	$748,737,321	2	$374,368,661	Monster Hunt ($387,053,506)
1	Monster Hunt (2015)	$387,053,506			
2	Monster Hunt 2 (2018)	$361,683,815			

20	Beverly Hills Cop	$735,534,503	3	$245,178,168	Beverly Hills Cop ($316,360,478)
1	Beverly Hills Cop (1984)	$316,360,478			
2	Beverly Hills Cop II (1987)	$299,965,036			
3	Beverly Hills Cop III (1994)	$119,208,989			

== See also ==
- List of highest-grossing films
- Lists of highest-grossing films
