= Universal 360: A Cinesphere Spectacular =

Defunct fireworks show attraction

Universal Studios Florida
- Area: Lagoon
- Status: Removed
- Opening date: July 1, 2006
- Closing date: September 9, 2011
- Replaced: Dynamite Nights Stunt Spectacular (1990–2000)
- Replaced by: Universal's Cinematic Spectacular: 100 Years of Movie Memories (2012–2017)

Ride statistics
- Attraction type: Fireworks show
- Theme: Universal Studios
- Duration: 15 minutes

Universal 360: A Cinesphere Spectacular was a fireworks show attraction located at Universal Studios Florida. It replaced the Dynamite Nights Stunt Spectacular, and featured famous scenes from Universal Pictures' films projected onto four large inflated domes in a lagoon located in the center of the park. The show generally took place at the hour of the park's closing. Director John Landis, best known for films like The Blues Brothers and An American Werewolf in London, served as a creative consultant on the project.

The show operated during major events and holidays including Easter, The 4th of July, Labor Day, Christmas and New Year's Eve. The spheres in the lagoon are usually removed for refurbishment during off-peak seasons.

== History ==
Dynamite Nights Stunt Spectacular opened with the park on June 7, 1990. The live stunt show was located on the Lagoon in the center of Universal Studios Florida. The show was themed around Miami Vice and featured a variety of pyrotechnics mixed with explosions and live actors on jet skis. Dynamite Nights Stunt Spectacular was discontinued on February 10, 2000. Many of the props and sets in the show still remained in place until July 1, 2006, when the show was replaced by Universal 360: A Cinesphere Spectacular.

== Summary ==
Universal 360: A Cinesphere Spectacular was a live fireworks experience, which took place at night during peak seasons only. It featured famous scenes from Universal Pictures films projected onto four large inflated domes in the middle of a lagoon, while various fireworks, flame effects, lasers, lights and water effects are set off. There are at least three viewing areas around the lake in which it is displayed. Projectors were located in a small boathouse facade on the lake, on the sound Stage 44 building, and on the side of The Simpsons Ride building. During major summer holidays, such as the Fourth of July, at least two or three shows were displayed.

The show's score was a combination of other various Universal Pictures' films, including Back to the Future, Apollo 13, Jaws, Jurassic Park and E.T. the Extra-Terrestrial. The score was directed and composed by Brad Kelley.

In an homage to the previous Dynamite Nights Stunt Spectacular attraction which it replaced, scenes showcasing the attraction were seen projected onto the spheres. The Cinespheres have the same air control found in a small house.

== Movie montage set of films ==
- Man on the Moon
- Back to the Future
- Jurassic Park
- Jaws
- Monkey Business
- Rear Window
- All Quiet on the Western Front
- Pillow Talk
- Psycho
- The Birds
- Buck Privates
- Touch of Evil
- Vertigo
- High Plains Drifter
- The Spoilers
- My Little Chickadee
- Brokeback Mountain
- Saboteur
- Dragonheart
- How the Grinch Stole Christmas
- Smokey and the Bandit
- Ray
- 8 Mile
- Seabiscuit
- The Mummy (1999)
- King Kong
- The Blues Brothers
- The Fast and the Furious
- The Bourne Identity
- The Bourne Supremacy
- Wanted
- Duel
- Hot Fuzz
- The War Wagon
- The Eiger Sanction
- Public Enemies
- Scarface
- U-571
- Backdraft
- Dante's Peak
- Master and Commander: The Far Side of the World
- Waterworld
- Apollo 13
- Born on the Fourth of July
- On Golden Pond
- Gladiator
- Scent of a Woman
- To Kill a Mockingbird
- Erin Brockovich
- The Hurricane
- The Deer Hunter
- A Beautiful Mind
- It Came from Outer Space
- The Incredible Shrinking Man
- The Mole People
- This Island Earth
- Terminator 2: Judgment Day
- Van Helsing
- Cape Fear
- The Thing
- An American Werewolf in London
- Bride of Chucky
- Red Dragon
- Halloween II
- Psycho II
- The Phantom of the Opera
- The Hunchback of Notre Dame
- Dracula
- Frankenstein
- The Mummy (1932)
- Creature from the Black Lagoon
- Abbott and Costello Meet Frankenstein
- Bruce Almighty
- Harry and the Hendersons
- The Flintstones
- American Graffiti
- American Pie
- Fast Times at Ridgemont High
- Animal House
- The Nutty Professor
- Sixteen Candles
- The Breakfast Club
- Along Came Polly
- Beethoven
- Baby Mama
- The Money Pit
- Mamma Mia!
- Sweet Charity
- Leatherheads
- Mallrats
- Thoroughly Modern Millie
- Billy Elliot
- Nutty Professor II: The Klumps
- The 40-Year-Old Virgin
- Out of Africa
- E.T. the Extra-Terrestrial
- Somewhere in Time
- Notting Hill
- Bridget Jones's Diary
- Shakespeare in Love
- The Jerk
- Weird Science
- The Sting
- Burn After Reading
- Car Wash
- They Live
- Rooster Cogburn
- Field of Dreams
- Frost/Nixon
- Liar Liar
- Friday Night Lights
- Spartacus
- Bend of the River
- The Incredible Hulk
- Hellboy II: The Golden Army

=== Former movie montage set of films ===
- The Invisible Man
- Shrek
- Peter Pan
- The Deadly Mantis
- Land of the Dead
- Dawn of the Dead
- Meet the Parents
- Happy Gilmore
- The Great Outdoors
- Hulk
- Miami Vice
- Out of Sight
- Spy Game
- 1941
- Cinderella Man
- Babe
- Gorillas in the Mist

== In popular culture ==
The year the show opened, that year's Bill & Ted's Excellent Halloween Adventure at Halloween Horror Nights contained a storyline in which Lex Luthor planned to use the Cinespheres (revealed to be the tops of nuclear warheads) and smash them into the park, destroying it. The resulting ruins would allow Lex to build Luthorversal, a Universal Studios knock-off featuring attractions based on what was, at the time, current events.

== See also ==
- 2011 in amusement parks
