= Abbott and Costello Meet Frankenstein =

1948 American horror comedy film directed by Charles Barton

- Theatrical release poster
- Directed by: Charles Barton
- Screenplay by: Robert Lees; Frederic I. Rinaldo; John Grant
- Produced by: Robert Arthur
- Starring: Bud Abbott; Lou Costello; Lon Chaney Jr.; Bela Lugosi; Glenn Strange; Lenore Aubert; Jane Randolph
- Cinematography: Charles Van Enger
- Edited by: Frank Gross
- Music by: Frank Skinner
- Production companies: Universal-International Pictures Co., Inc.
- Distributed by: Universal Pictures
- Release date: June 25, 1948
- Running time: 82 minutes
- Country: United States
- Language: English
- Budget: $792,270
- Box office: $3.2 million

Abbott and Costello Meet Frankenstein (Note: Historian Gary Don Rhodes stated the title most identified with the film is Abbott and Costello Meet Frankenstein. Studio publications have referred to it as Bud Abbott and Lou Costello Meet Frankenstein while the opening credits for the film refer to it as Bud Abbott Lou Costello Meet Frankenstein without the "and".) is a 1948 American horror comedy film directed by Charles Barton. Tangentially linked to the Universal Monsters film series, the film features Count Dracula (Bela Lugosi), who has partnered with Dr. Sandra Mornay (Lenore Aubert) in order to find a brain to reactivate Frankenstein's monster (Glenn Strange), and they find Wilbur Grey (Lou Costello), the ideal candidate.

The film was developed and production started with misgivings by Bud Abbott and Lou Costello, who disliked the script. Barton faced difficulty during the production of the film, with Abbott and Costello often absent from the set. However, the film was successful at the box office and became one of Universal's top films of the year. Several follow-up films ensued involving Abbott and Costello meeting other horror film actors and monsters. The film was mostly well received by critics on its release and in 2001, the United States Library of Congress deemed the film "culturally, historically, or aesthetically significant" and selected it for preservation in the National Film Registry; it also placed at number 56 on the list of the American Film Institute's 100 Funniest American Movies.

== Plot ==
Larry Talbot makes an urgent phone call to a railway station in Florida, where Chick Young and Wilbur Grey work as baggage clerks. Talbot tries to warn Wilbur of a shipment due to arrive for "McDougal's House of Horrors". However, before he finishes, the moon rises and Talbot transforms into a werewolf, causing Wilbur to think the call is a prank. Meanwhile, McDougal demands the crates be personally delivered to his wax museum.

Chick and Wilbur deliver the crates after hours. They open the first one and find Dracula's coffin. When Chick leaves the room to retrieve the second crate, Wilbur reads the Dracula legend and the coffin suddenly opens, and Dracula sneaks out. Wilbur is so frightened he can barely articulate his call for help. When Chick returns, he refuses to believe the story. The boys open the second crate, and Chick goes to greet McDougal. Dracula hypnotizes Wilbur, finds Frankenstein's Monster in the second crate, and reanimates him. Both leave and McDougal finds the crates empty and has Wilbur and Chick arrested.

That night, Dr Sandra Mornay welcomes Dracula and the Monster to her island castle. Sandra has seduced Wilbur as part of Dracula's plan to give the monster a more obedient brain. Meanwhile, Wilbur and Chick are bailed out of jail by Joan Raymond, an undercover insurance investigator who feigns love for Wilbur, hoping to gain information. Wilbur invites Joan to a masquerade ball that evening. Talbot takes the apartment across the hall from Wilbur and Chick and asks them to help him find and destroy Dracula and the Monster. Wilbur agrees, but Chick remains sceptical.

Wilbur, Chick and Joan go to Sandra's castle to pick her up for the ball. Wilbur answers a telephone call from Talbot, who informs them that they are in fact in the "House of Dracula". Wilbur reluctantly agrees to search the castle and soon stumbles upon a basement staircase, where he has a few close encounters with the monsters. Meanwhile, Joan discovers Dr Frankenstein's notebook in Sandra's desk, and Sandra finds an Insurance Investigator ID in Joan's purse.

Dracula, under the alias of Dr Lejos, introduces himself to Joan and the boys. Also working at the castle and attending the ball is the naïve Professor Stevens, who questions some of the specialized equipment that has arrived. After Wilbur says that he was in the basement, Sandra feigns a headache and tells the others to attend the ball without her. In private, Sandra admits to Dracula that she feels they are not safe to conduct the experiment. Dracula then turns her into a vampire.

At the masquerade ball, Talbot accuses Lejos of being Dracula, but no one takes him seriously. Joan soon disappears. Sandra lures Wilbur into the woods and attempts to bite him, but fails. While looking for Joan, Talbot becomes the Wolfman and attacks McDougal. Since Chick's costume is a wolf, McDougal accuses Chick, who escapes and witnesses Dracula hypnotizing Wilbur. Chick is also hypnotized and rendered helpless, while Dracula and Sandra bring Wilbur, Stevens, and Joan back to the castle. The next morning, Chick and Talbot meet up in the bayou and set out to rescue Wilbur and Joan.

Wilbur is quickly freed, but Dracula uses hypnotism to call him back. As Sandra prepares to cut into Wilbur's brain, Talbot and Chick burst in. Chick knocks out Sandra with a chair and Talbot tries to release Wilbur but turns into the Wolfman again. Frankenstein's Monster breaks free of his bonds and Sandra tries to control him, but he throws her out the window. After a chase through the house between Chick, Wilbur and the Monster and a face-off between Dracula and The Wolf Man, Dracula transforms into a bat but is pounced on by the Wolfman, who drags the two of them to their deaths. Chick and Wilbur escape in boats; while Joan and Stevens set the pier ablaze while the Monster is standing on it, and he dies in the flames.

Wilbur scolds Chick for his earlier scepticism, and Chick remarks they have nothing to fear now. The Invisible Man addresses them from the boat's thwart, and they jump into the water in terror.

== Cast ==
Cast adapted from the American Film Institute:

- Bud Abbott as Chick Young
- Lou Costello as Wilbur Grey
- Lon Chaney Jr. as Lawrence Talbot / The Wolf Man
- Béla Lugosi as Dracula / Dr. Lejos
- Glenn Strange as the Monster
- Lenore Aubert as Sandra Mornay
- Jane Randolph as Joan Raymond
- Frank Ferguson as Mr. McDougal
- Charles Bradstreet as Dr. Stevens
- Vincent Price as the voice of The Invisible Man (uncredited)

== Production ==
=== Background and development ===
On November 28, 1945, Universal Pictures joined with British entrepreneur J. Arthur Rank, who bought a one-fourth interest in the studio. In 1946, Universal reported a profit of only $4.6 million. They responded by dropping many actors from their contract roster, including Chaney. On July 31, 1946, an official merger began. The company, now called Universal–International, had only Deanna Durbin, Maria Montez, Bud Abbott and Lou Costello and a few other actors remaining on their payroll. Since the February 1941 release of Buck Privates starring Abbott and Costello, the duo were among the most powerful stars at Universal. By 1945 however, the duo were close to splitting due to in-fighting with each other and personal issues; Abbott suffered from severe epilepsy and Costello had nearly died of rheumatic heart disease in 1943.

In their first year of operation, the studio nearly went bankrupt. By 1948, William Goetz had been in charge of production since the merger and Abbott and Costello's popularity was waning. According to director Charles Barton, who was among the top comedy film directors at Universal between 1945 and 1952, Goetz did not want anything to do with Abbott and Costello after Metro-Goldwyn-Mayer had dropped their option for more films and Camel Cigarettes dropped their radio show in 1947.

=== Preproduction ===
Robert Arthur, a former writer and associate producer of MGM musicals along with veteran Abbott and Costello writers Frederic Rinaldo and Robert Lees, developed a script that involved Frankenstein's monster, Count Dracula and the Wolf Man. Their original script also included Kharis the Mummy, Dracula's son Count Alucard and the Invisible Man, and involved the Monster becoming Dracula's slave and the search for the brain of a simpleton to be placed into the Monster's body. Kharis and Alucard were dropped from the script and the Invisible Man was only included as a small gag at the end of the film. On reading the script, initially titled The Brain of Frankenstein, Lou Costello responded negatively, stating "You don't think I'll do that crap do you? My 5-year-old daughter can write something better than that". Variety made the first public announcement of The Brain of Frankenstein in July 1947.

Arthur felt strongly about the project and offered Costello a $50,000 advance on his percentage if he agreed to do the film. Among the cast was Glenn Strange, who had previously played the Monster in House of Dracula (1945). Strange had only been in a handful of roles since that film, including Monogram's Beauty and the Bandit (1946), Eagle-Lion's Frontier Fighters (1947) and two for Universal: Brute Force (1947) and another Abbott and Costello film, The Wistful Widow of Wagon Gap (1947). Other actors were called back to reprise roles from previous Universal horror films, including Lon Chaney Jr. as the Wolf Man. Chaney had been doing stage work on Of Mice and Men and Born Yesterday. Returning as Dracula was Bela Lugosi, who had not worked in a Hollywood studio since 1946 with Scared to Death. Universal-International had Lugosi, Chaney and Strange sign their contracts for the film on January 16, 1948. Lugosi spoke positively about the role during production, glad that the script was not "unbecoming to Dracula's dignity" and that "all I have to do is frighten the boys, a perfectly appropriate activity. My trademark will be unblemished".

=== Production ===
"All three of the 'monsters' were the nicest. The real monsters were Abbott and Costello".

— Charles Barton, director of Abbott and Costello Meet Frankenstein

Production began on February 5, 1948. According to Barton, Abbott and Costello were not happy with working on the project, noting that the two would "fight me like hell. But I stood my ground with them, and so did Bob Arthur". Barton continued that both the comedians would leave home several times during shooting the film, not show up, or spend about three days playing cards on set. Abbott and Costello improvised some dialogue in the film. Other script alterations were made in the film, such as a week within shooting when producer Robert Arthur decided to change the ending of the film to include a cameo by the Invisible Man.

The film had a new make-up department instead of the old one headed by Jack Pierce. Emile LaVigne tended to Chaney's make-up while Jack Kevan worked on Glenn Strange. Both Chaney and Strange required one hour each in the make-up chair each morning, although Strange's make-up was mostly a rubber mask.

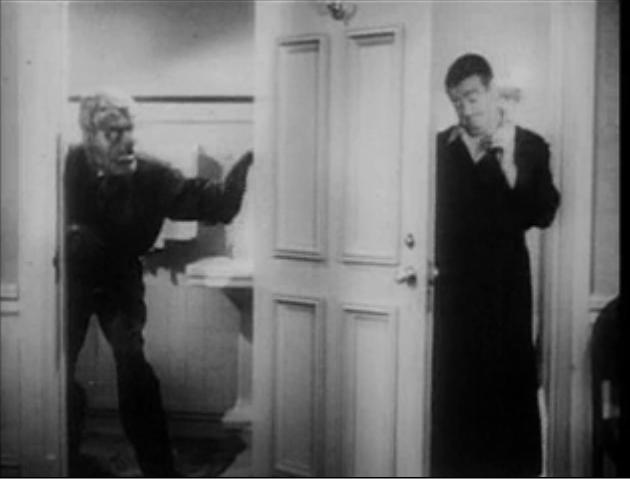
A screenshot featuring Lon Chaney and Lou Costello

An accident happened on set when Strange was supposed to throw Lenore Aubert through a window. An invisible wire was attached to her to help Strange lift her, but when she was thrown, she swung back into camera range. Strange tried to catch her, causing him to fall and break his foot. As Strange's injury was being treated, Chaney took to applying the make-up and portrayed the monster throwing Aubert through the window. By the end of February, the film's title had changed to one closer resembling its final release title. Filming completed on March 20, 1948. A new scene was filmed after production wrapped with Jane Randolph on April 9.

Post-production started immediately on the film. Frank Skinner, who had previously scored Son of Frankenstein (1939) and worked on the score of The Wolf Man, (1941) composed the original score for the film. Some effect shots were filmed in late March. Special effects for the film were developed by David Horsley and Jerome Ash and included the bats that could be seen in the eyes of Miss Aubert and the animation that transformed Lugosi into a bat.

== Release ==
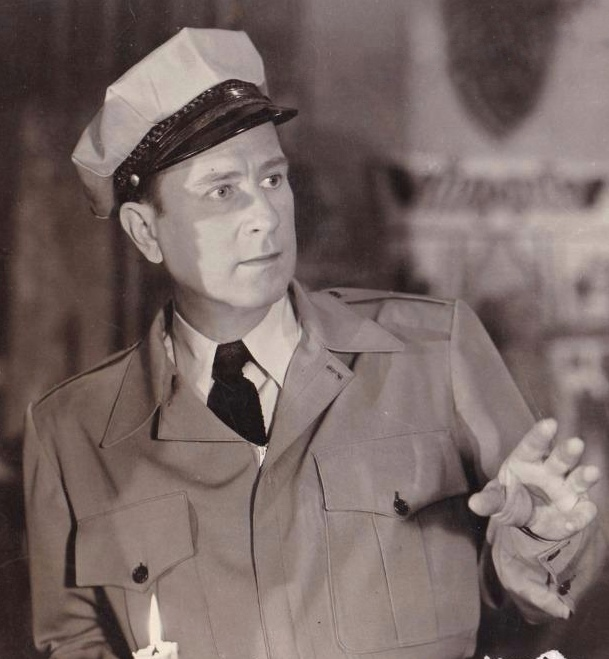
Bud Abbott in the film

Contemporary sources vary on the first release of Abbott and Costello Meet Frankenstein. The AFI Catalog of Feature Films and Rhodes book No Traveller Returns declare it was released on June 15, 1948, with no information on when or where this release took place. Historian Gregory W. Mank has stated in three separate books that the film premiered in Los Angeles at the Forum Theatre on June 25, 1948. Earliest reviews of the film appear in publications such as Variety and The Hollywood Reporter only on June 28, 1948. Universal-International also did not copyright the film until August 1948.

The film went on to become the most successful film in the Frankenstein series since the original release of Frankenstein (1931). Along with The Naked City (1948) and Tap Roots (1948), it became one of Universal-International's highest grossing features of the year. To promote the film, Universal paid Boris Karloff's New York hotel bill to pose outside of Loew's Criterion Theatre in New York. Karloff agreed, stating "as long as I don't have to see the movie!" Box office was particularly strong in New York City, Chicago, Boston and Los Angeles. According to Variety the film earned $2.2 million in the US in 1948.

It was initially banned in British Columbia and then later allowed for release after most of the scenes involving the Wolf Man were removed. On the film's release in Australia, nearly all the scenes with a monster were removed. In England, the film was released as Abbott and Costello Meet the Ghosts. The film was reissued on March 23, 1956, on a double-bill with Abbott and Costello Meet the Killer, Boris Karloff.

=== Home media ===
On the film's release on LaserDisc, Douglas Pratt, author of The Laser Video Disc Companion described the disc as "highly sought after" as only a few hundred copies were issued (MCA DiscoVision label release among the first videodisc titles produced in 1978). It was reissued as an Encore Edition afterwards. It was first released on DVD on August 29, 2000, and was re-released several times as part of different Abbott and Costello collections, The Best of Abbott and Costello Volume Three, on August 3, 2004, on October 28, 2008, as part of Abbott and Costello: The Complete Universal Pictures Collection, and in 2015 in the Abbott and Costello Meet the Monsters Collection. The film's Blu-ray debut and DVD re-release was on September 4, 2012, as part of Universal's 100th Anniversary series. It was also included in Frankenstein: Complete Legacy Collection (2014) along with seven other Universal Frankenstein films. Because this film includes characters and people featured in their own collections, it is part of the legacy collections of "Frankenstein", "Dracula", "The Wolf Man", and "The Best of Abbott and Costello".

== Reception ==
From contemporary reviews, trade papers praised the film. A review in The Hollywood Reporter proclaimed it as a "crazy giddy show" noting that "Robert Arthur's production spells out showmanship right down the line, and Charles T. Barton's direction keeps things moving at a lively, vigorous pace". Variety echoed this praise, stating that Arthur and Barton "can chalk it up as one of the best for [Abbott and Costello]". The Los Angeles Times critic Philip K. Scheuer praised the film as "put together with enormous ingenuity. Its comic inventiveness seldom falters, yet it never seriously violates the tradition of the three celebrated creatures who are its antagonists". The reviews continued to be positive from other industry press papers, including Film Daily, Daily Variety, Harrison's Reports, and Motion Picture Daily. On the film's release in New York City's Lowe's Criterion Theatre, the film predominantly received negative reviews from the Manhattan critics. Bosley Crowther of The New York Times wrote that he found the idea of the film amusing but ultimately found it to be an "assembly-line comedy". The New York Sun found the story was a "grand idea, but it was too bad that it could have been attended by persons capable of satire rather than pie-throwing comedy only". A review from New York World-Telegram warned audiences that if they did not have the palate for Abbott and Costello's comedy the film would be a "painful experience". The negative response to the film in New York made a review in The Hollywood Reporter refer to the New York critics as "the "BOO-geymen of Broadway". One positive mention in New York came from the New York Star, which declared that "it's heart-warming to see all our favorite monsters once more, each inexorably expressing his individuality, all at the same time. It's kind of like a class reunion. They look a little older now, and a little tired. Dracula seems to creak a bit with arthritis as he emerges from his coffin these days, but his bite has lost some of its depth".

From retrospective reviews, Carlos Clarens wrote about the monster rally films, such as House of Frankenstein (1944) and House of Dracula, in his book An Illustrated History of the Horror Film (1967) summarizing that "the sole charm of these films resides in the very proficient contract players that populated them", but by the time of Abbott and Costello Meet Frankenstein was released, the film's "unconscious parody finally gave way to deliberate spoof" and, at this point, "Universal was flogging a dead horse".

A later review from Kim Newman writing for Empire described it as not one of Abbott and Costello's better films, finding they do a lot of "whining and slapping business". Dave Kehr of the Chicago Reader stated similar reactions, noting that Abbott and Costello "never got the hang of the kiddie slapstick Universal assigned to them" and that the film was "probably the last of their watchable films, though it's a long way from their best". On reviewing Abbott and Costello's output at Universal in 2010, Nick Pinkerton in Sight & Sound summarized that the duo's work was an "all-or-nothing proposition, something you either take or leave" and that described the duo's general reception, finding them "stuck somewhere beneath Laurel and Hardy and just above, say, the Ritz Brothers."

== Legacy ==
Following the success of the film, Universal-International paired Abbott and Costello in similar scenarios. The first was Abbott and Costello Meet the Killer, Boris Karloff (1949), followed by Abbott and Costello Meet the Invisible Man (1951), Abbott and Costello Meet Dr. Jekyll and Mr. Hyde (1953), and their last film for Universal: Abbott and Costello Meet the Mummy (1955). The duo only made one more film afterwards, Dance with Me, Henry (1956), which was directed by Barton and made for United Artists.

Lon Chaney Jr. did not have positive things to say about the feature, later proclaiming that he "used to enjoy horror films when there was thought and sympathy involved. Then they became comedies. Abbott and Costello ruined the horror films: they made buffoons out of the monsters..."

Kim Newman declared that Abbott and Costello Meet Frankenstein, unlike that of House of Frankenstein and House of Dracula, set a precedent that in films where there are multiple monsters, Dracula will be their leader. This plot element would be replicated in later films such as The Monster Squad (1987), The Creeps (1997), Van Helsing (2004), Hotel Transylvania (2012) and Monster Family (2017).

In 2001, the United States Library of Congress deemed this film "culturally, historically, or aesthetically significant" and selected it for preservation in the National Film Registry, The film is number 56 on the list of the American Film Institute's "100 Funniest American Movies".

Jerry Garcia of The Grateful Dead, acknowledged the movie as one that "changed my life" and was an inspiration for his art and music.

== See also ==
- List of comedy films of the 1940s
- List of horror films of the 1940s
- List of Universal Pictures films (1940–1949)

== Bibliography ==
- Clarens, Carlos (1997) [1st pub. 1967]. An Illustrated History of Horror and Science-Fiction Films. Da Capo Press. ISBN 0-306-80800-5.
- Crowther, Bosley (July 29, 1948). "The Screen; That One Laugh". The New York Times.
- Furmanek, Bob; Palumbo, Ron (1991). Abbott and Costello in Hollywood. Perigee Books. ISBN 0-399-51605-0.
- Kehr, Dave. "Abbott and Costello Meet Frankenstein". Chicago Reader. Archived from the original on June 24, 2009.
- Mank, Gregory William (1981). It's Alive! The Classic Cinema Saga of Frankenstein. A.S. Barnes & Company, Inc. ISBN 0-498-02473-3.
- Mank, Gregory William (2010). Bela Lugosi and Boris Karloff. McFarland. ISBN 9780786419227.
- Mank, Gregory William (2015). Women in Horror Films, 1940s. McFarland. ISBN 9781476609553.
- Mank, Gregory Wm. (2020) [1993]. "Production Background". In Riley, Philip J. (ed.). House of Dracula. BearManor Media. ISBN 978-1629336169.
- Miller, Jeffrey S. (2000). The Horror Spoofs of Abbott and Costello: A Critical Assessment of the Comedy Team's Monster Films. McFarland & Company. ISBN 0786406429.
- Newman, Kim (April 27, 2006). "Abbott and Costello Meet Frankenstein Review". Empire. Archived from the original on December 17, 2021.
- Newman, Kim (May 2023). "Bite Club: The Evolution of Dracula". Sight and Sound. Vol. 33, no. 4.
- Pinkerton, Nick (April 2020). "He's With Stupid". Sight & Sound. Vol. 30, no. 4.
- Pratt, Douglas (January 1992). The Laser Video Disc Companion. New York Zoetrope. ISBN 0-918432-89-8.
- Rhodes, Gary D.; Kaffenberger, Bill (2016). No Traveler Returns: The Lost Years of Bela Lugosi (Kindle ed.). BearManor Media. ISBN 978-1-59393-285-5.
- Weaver, Tom; Brunas, Michael; Brunas, John (2007) [1990]. Universal Horrors (2 ed.). McFarland & Company. ISBN 978-0-7864-2974-5.
