= House of Frankenstein (film) =

- Theatrical release poster
- Directed by: Erle C. Kenton
- Screenplay by: Edward T. Lowe
- Based on: The Devil's Brood by Curt Siodmak
- Produced by: Paul Malvern
- Starring: Boris Karloff; Lon Chaney Jr.; John Carradine; J. Carrol Naish
- Cinematography: George Robinson
- Edited by: Philip Cahn
- Production company: Universal Pictures Company, Inc.
- Distributed by: Universal Pictures Company, Inc.
- Release dates: 15 December 1944 (New York City); 16 February 1945 (United States)
- Running time: 70 minutes
- Country: United States
- Budget: $354,000

House of Frankenstein is a 1944 American horror film starring Boris Karloff, Lon Chaney Jr. and John Carradine. It was directed by Erle C. Kenton and produced by Universal Pictures. Based on Curt Siodmak's story "The Devil's Brood", the film is about Dr. Gustav Niemann, who escapes from prison and promises to create a new body for his assistant Daniel. Over the course of the film, they encounter Count Dracula, the Wolf Man (Larry Talbot), and Frankenstein's monster. The film is a sequel to Frankenstein Meets the Wolf Man (1943).

Universal had initially planned a film titled Chamber of Horrors, which would have included several of their horror-themed characters, but this project was canceled. The concept was later revived as House of Frankenstein. Filming began on April 4, 1944, with the highest budget for a Universal Frankenstein film at that time, and ended in early May. Screenings started in New York City on December 15, 1944. It was not among the highest-grossing films for Universal that year, but it managed to make more money than other Universal horror-related output such as Ghost Catchers (1944) and The Invisible Man's Revenge (1944).

Film historian Gregory W. Mank notes that the critics "made mincemeat" out of House of Frankenstein upon its release. Retrospective reviews focused on the absurdity of connecting the monsters together and the lack of scares in the film. A sequel titled House of Dracula that involved much of the same cast and crew was released in 1945.

== Plot ==
For trying to replicate Dr. Frankenstein's experiments, Dr. Gustav Niemann is put in prison, where he meets another incarcerated criminal, the hunchback Daniel. Promising to create a new, beautiful body for Daniel, Niemann convinces him to become his assistant. During an earthquake, the two escape. Niemman and Daniel stumble upon traveling showman Professor Lampini, murder him and take over his horror exhibit, which includes the recovered corpse of Count Dracula. To exact revenge on Burgomaster Hussman for putting him in prison, Niemann revives Dracula. Dracula hypnotizes Hussman's granddaughter-in-law Rita and kills the Burgomaster. Hussman's grandson notices what is going on and alerts the police, who go after Dracula. Waiting in a nearby carriage, Niemann notices it is Dracula whom the police are after and jettisons Dracula's coffin to flee with Daniel. As Dracula scrambles to get back inside, the sun rises and kills him.

Niemann and Daniel travel to the flooded ruins of Castle Frankenstein in Vasaria. En route, Daniel saves a Romani woman named Ilonka from being whipped by her companion over an argument about money. Smitten by Ilonka, Daniel convinces her to join them in their travels. At the Castle, they find the bodies of Frankenstein's monster and Larry Talbot, preserved in the frozen cavern beneath the castle. Niemann thaws their bodies, and Talbot turns back into human form. Niemann promises to cure his werewolf curse by transferring his brain into a different body if Talbot leads them to Frankenstein's notes. Seeing Ilonka has fallen in love with Talbot, Daniel suggests Niemann transfer his brain into Talbot's vacated body. Talbot finds the notes, but Niemann is more interested in reviving the monster and exacting revenge on two traitorous former associates than in keeping his promises to Talbot and Daniel. Aided by Daniel, Niemann kidnaps his former associates and plans to transfer their brains into the monsters' bodies, cursing them to live the tragic lives of the creatures. That night, Talbot transforms into a werewolf and kills a man, sending the villagers into a panic.

Daniel warns Ilonka that Talbot is a werewolf, but she is undeterred. Not trusting Niemann to cure him, Talbot instructs her to build silver bullets, load them into a gun and wait at night near his bedroom. That night, Niemann revives the monster and Talbot turns into a werewolf. The Wolf Man attacks and fatally wounds Ilonka, who shoots and kills him before dying. Daniel blames Niemann for Ilonka's death, reasoning that if he had transferred Daniel's brain as asked then she would not have gotten involved with a werewolf, and attacks him. Having bonded with the man who revived him, the monster intervenes and throws Daniel out the window. With Daniel dead, the monster carries the half-conscious Niemann outside, where the villagers chase them into the marshes. There, the monster and Niemann drown in quicksand.

== Cast ==
Cast sourced from the book Universal Horrors:

- Boris Karloff as Dr. Gustav Niemann
- Lon Chaney Jr. as Lawrence Stewart Talbot, the Wolf Man
- John Carradine as Count Dracula
- J. Carrol Naish as Daniel
- Glenn Strange as The Monster
- Anne Gwynne as Rita Hussman
- Peter Coe as Carl Hussman
- Lionel Atwill as Insp. Arnz
- George Zucco as Prof. Bruno Lampini
- Elena Verdugo as Ilonka
- Sig Ruman as Burgomaster Hussman
- William Edmunds as Fejos
- Charles F. Miller as Tobermann
- Julius Tannen as Hertz
- Philip Van Zandt as Insp. Müller
- Hans Herbert as Meier
- Dick Dickinson as Born
- George Lynn as Gerlach
- Michael Mark as Frederick Strauss

== Production ==
=== Background and pre-production ===
On June 7, 1943, a film production titled Chamber of Horrors was announced by The Hollywood Reporter, noting that the cast would include Boris Karloff, Lon Chaney Jr., Bela Lugosi, Peter Lorre, Claude Rains, George Zucco, and James Barton with characters such as the Invisible Man, the Mad Ghoul, the Mummy and "other assorted monsters". Chamber of Horrors never went into production. Curt Siodmak spoke little on developing the story for the film, stating that "the idea was to put all the horror characters into one picture. I only wrote the story. I didn't write the script. I never saw the picture". The screenplay was written by Edward T. Lowe, who had previously written scripts for The Hunchback of Notre Dame (1923) and The Vampire Bat (1933). Lowe's script changed parts of Siodmak's story, including removing the mummy Kharis.

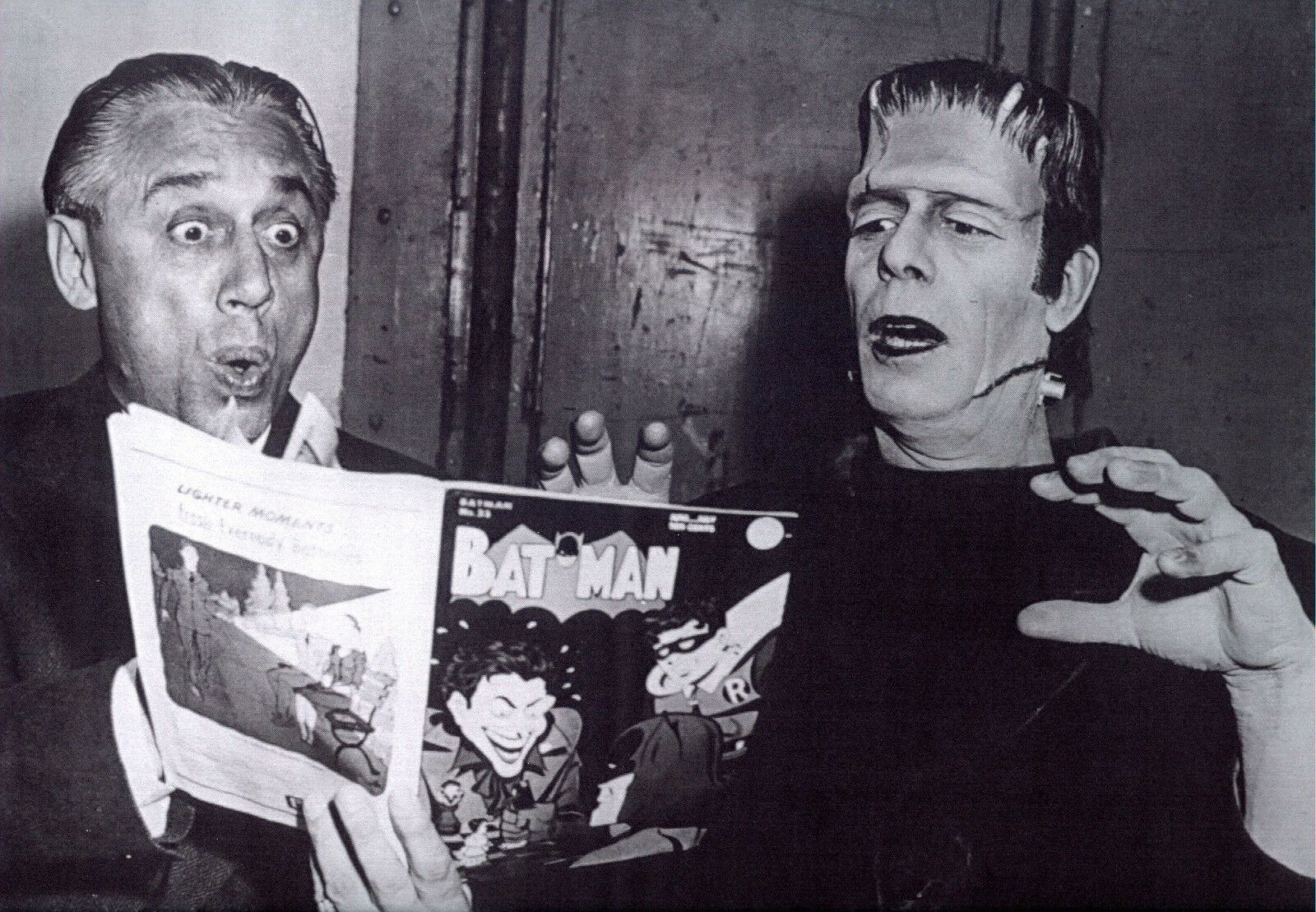
Behind-the-scenes publicity still for House of Frankenstein showing producer Paul Malvern (left) and Glenn Strange (right), in his Frankenstein's monster make-up

The film's producer Paul Malvern began assigning a cast that included Karloff, who Universal had on for a two-picture deal, Lon Chaney Jr., John Carradine and J. Carrol Naish. The cast was officially assembled in February 1944. On discussions with the cast, Anne Gwynne confided later in an interview with Michael Fitzgerald that she did not think Karloff was happy with his mad scientist role in the film. In an interview in early 1944, Karloff stated he would "never play Frankenstein's Monster again [...] Other people have taken similar roles and the edge is off of it. I am through with it.... I made these horror films. They were of little importance in anybody's scheme of things, including my own, and though I did make a disgraceful amount of money, I was getting nowhere."

The role of the monster was given to Glenn Strange, who over the previous 12 years spent his time in Western films, Universal's The Mummy's Tomb (1942), and Producers Releasing Corporation's The Mad Monster (1942) and The Monster Maker (1944). Prior to Strange's casting, Lane Chandler tested for the role. Strange was unaware that he was being called to play the monster and only found out when he was reported to Jack Pierce's make-up studio to have a scar applied to him. After which, Pierce phoned producer Paul Malvern stating they had found their new monster.

=== Filming and post-production ===
"[Horror films] give us a chance to let our imagination run wild. The art department can go to town on creep sets. Prop men have fun with cobwebs. The cameraman has fun with trick lighting and shadows. The director has fun. We have more fun making a horror picture than a comedy."

— Director Erle C. Kenton in 1944.

Preparations for House of Frankenstein began in August 1943 under the title The Devil's Brood. The film's budget was $354,000. This was the highest budget set for a Universal Frankenstein film at that time, though Frankenstein (1931) and Bride of Frankenstein exceeded this amount by running over-budget. It was given a 30-day shooting schedule with initial shooting to begin on April 4, 1944, using the sets from Green Hell (1940) and Pittsburgh (1942). Other sets from Gung Ho! (1943) and Tower of London (1939) were also used.

On set, Carradine treated those on set to recitations from the works of Shakespeare and Chaney would occasionally prepare lavish lunches for his dressing room co-stars. Strange noted the monster make-up was uncomfortable on set, making him feel like he had water on the brain and that he was not allowed into the studio commissary, having to eat a sack lunch away from others, leading Strange to speculate, "I guess they didn't want me to turn the stomachs of stars and starlets." The scene where Niemann thaws the monster's tissues with steam was accomplished by putting Strange in a glass case and pumping vapor into it. Long rubber hoses were put in Strange's nose so that he could breathe in spite of the vapor, but while shooting the scene Strange found he could not exhale efficiently through the hoses and was suffocating, prompting him to frantically push a panic button which the prop crew had installed inside the case. Strange also had a scene where he throws J. Carrol Naish through a window and onto prop mattresses. Strange misjudged his throw, leading to Naish missing the mattress and landing on the cement floor. Naish's large padded hunchback cushioned his fall sufficiently to prevent serious injury.

Blonde-haired Elena Verdugo wore a brunette wig for her part, since the studio would not accept a blonde gypsy. She choreographed Ilonka's gypsy dance herself, and had to make it work around the rocks which littered the filming location.

Director Erle C. Kenton set the scenes involving Count Dracula to be shot last. Filming was completed on May 8. The music score was a collaborative effort between Hans J. Salter, Paul Dessau and Charles Previn. Most of the film's score was written specifically for House of Frankenstein, as opposed other films of the period that re-used older musical cues. After filming was completed in May and prior to its premiere, the film's title was changed to House of Frankenstein.

== Release ==
House of Frankenstein was shown at the 594-seat Rialto Theatre in New York City on December 15, 1944. The film was so popular that it ran all night and then played at the theatre for three weeks. On December 22, House of Frankenstein and The Mummy's Curse opened at the 1,100-seat Hawaii Theatre in Hollywood. The film continued screening there for six weeks. On February 20, the film had a week-long run at Los Angeles's 2,200-seat Orpheum Theatre. The film was distributed theatrically by Universal Pictures. The film was released nationally on February 16, 1945, following the initial in New York premieres in December 1944. According to the National Box Office Digest, the film grossed between $200,000 to $500,000. It was not among the highest-grossing films for Universal that year which included Can't Help Singing (1944) and Ali Baba and the Forty Thieves (1944), as well as the studio's other horror outings with The Climax (1944). It managed to outgross similar horror-related output from Universal such as Ghost Catchers (1944) and The Invisible Man's Revenge (1944).

The first news of a follow-up to House of Frankenstein appeared in Hollywood trade papers in April 1944 with the announcement of a film titled The Wolf Man vs. Dracula. This sequel would become House of Dracula (1945), albeit with a different script. Bernard Schubert was hired to write the script and turned in his first draft on May 19, 1944. House of Dracula is a continuation of the film House of Frankenstein and used much of that film's crew. Actors John Carradine, Glen Strange, and Lon Chaney Jr. reprise their roles as Count Dracula, Frankenstein's monster, and the Wolf Man, respectively. It was released on December 7, 1945.

House of Frankenstein was released on home video in 1992 by MCA Home Video. The film was released on DVD as part of The Monster Legacy Collection and Frankenstein: The Legacy Collection on April 27, 2004. House of Frankenstein was released on Blu-ray on August 28, 2018.

== Reception ==
Film historian Gregory W. Mank declared that, on the film's premiere in New York City, critics "made mincemeat" out of it. Wanda Hale of the New York Daily News gave the film a two-and-a-half star rating, commenting that "settings, lighting and costumes, impressively eerie and horrendous, will help you enter into the sinister proceedings", while noting that audiences should "be sure and check your credulity outside". A. H. Weiler of The New York Times stated that as a film "this grisly congress doesn't hit hard; it merely has speed and a change of pace. As such, then, it is bound to garner as many chuckles as it does chills". The New York Herald Tribune gave a negative review, stating the "plot stumbles along endlessly in its top-heavy attempt to carry on its shoulders too many of yesterday's nightmares" concluding that the film "is only a little more terrifying than the house that Jack built". Harrison's Reports called it "only a mild horror picture, more ludicrous than terrifying. The whole thing is a rehash of the fantastic doings of these characters in previous pictures and, since they do exactly what is expected of them, the spectator is neither shocked nor chilled".

A reviewer for the Motion Picture Herald deemed the picture an "excellent horror film", complimenting the acting, makeup, clever photography, lighting and score, also noting that at their screening at the Rialto Theatre in New York the "matinee audience was more than satisfied". In 1946 Boris Karloff, referred to the film as "the monster clambake", while working on Val Lewton-produced pictures for RKO, referring to Lewton as "the man who rescued me from the living dead and restored my soul." Gwynne spoke of her role later in her career stating that "the part was nice but not great, I had fun with it, but I'm only in the first 25 minutes and then zap, I'm off for the rest of the film!"

In retrospective reviews, Carlos Clarens wrote about Universal's character cross-over films, also known as the Monster Rally films, in his book An Illustrated History of the Horror Film summarizing that "the sole charm of these films resides in the very proficient contract players that populated them, portraying gypsies, mad scientists, lustful high priests, vampire-killers, or mere red herrings". Kim Newman discussed the Monster Rally films in his book The Definitive Guide to Horror Movies, stating that they were endearing in trying to find ways around the monsters seemingly permanent deaths but that they also "don't even try to be terrifying, and seem to be entirely pitched at children's matinees." In his book Horror!, Drake Douglas commented that "The Monster became a clumsy automation", and that Strange's monster "had chubby cheeks and dead eyes and the face of a mindless somnambulist rather than a vibrantly living, evil creature." In his book on Universal's Frankenstein series, Gregory W. Mank stated that, despite the virtues of its exciting action sequences, moody ice cavern scene, directorial style, beautiful score, and impressive cast, "the film has never succeeded in transcending its ignoble purpose: to cram together as many horrors as 70 minutes allow. Nor has it ever been forgiven by the more discriminating terror film aficionados for taking another giant step in the degradation of Frankenstein's monster." A review in Phil Hardy's book Science Fiction (1984) declared that "the film's cheap-skate opportunity verges on surrealism at times as it moves from monster to monster with bewildering rapidity" while finding the film less ludicrous than its follow-up, House of Dracula.

== See also ==
- Frankenstein in popular culture
- Universal Classic Monsters
- List of horror films of the 1940s
- List of Universal Pictures films (1940–1949)
