= Special Delivery (1955 film) =

1955 film

- Directed by: John Brahm
- Written by: Philip H. Reisman Jr.; Dwight Taylor; Géza von Radványi (idea)
- Produced by: Gilbert de Goldschmidt (producer); Oskar Kalbus (supervising producer); Charles Münzel (executive producer); Stuart Schulberg (producer)
- Starring: Joseph Cotten; Eva Bartok; Bob Cunningham
- Cinematography: Joseph C. Brun
- Edited by: Georges Klotz
- Music by: Bernhard Kaun
- Production company: Trans-Rhein Film
- Distributed by: Columbia Film-Verleih (West Germany); Columbia Pictures (United States)
- Release dates: April 1955 (West Germany); September 1955 (United States)
- Running time: 86 minutes
- Countries: United States; West Germany
- Languages: English; German; (filmed simultaneously in both languages)

Special Delivery (German: Vom Himmel gefallen) is a 1955 American–West German comedy film, directed by John Brahm. It stars Joseph Cotten and Eva Bartok. Special Delivery was filmed simultaneously in an English- and German-language version.

== Plot ==
Somewhere behind the Iron Curtain, mid 1950s. John Adams is a US embassy chargé d'affaires in a communist country in Eastern Europe. One day he has to deal with a very special case: in the front yard of the embassy, a baby has been laid down, as if it had "fallen from heaven"! Nobody knows how it got there, nobody saw the person who put it there. A found object in the front yard of the embassy is not all that unusual, because many a person persecuted by the regime has thrown something over the embassy fence so that it does not fall into the hands of the communist cultural barbarians. For the embassy, with its six exclusively male employees, the baby poses a serious problem: what to do? The government of the Eastern European country immediately demands the extradition of the young "citizen" and immediately sends a stubborn state representative, Comrade Kovacs. Adams, on the other hand, decides to stonewall and not hand the baby over to the communists. In order to ensure the care of the little one, who is simply called Sam after Uncle Sam, the host country also provides its own nanny. Sonja Novaswobida, as she is called, is also supposed to collect further information on site on behalf of her government.

Due to mutual distrust, the men's relationships with the Eastern European state employee initially range from difficult to cold, especially since Kovacs turns out to be a particularly tough opponent for Ambassador Adams. He insists on returning the baby to the country as a kind of public property. Adams, however, wants to hand over just that, and instead, with some ironic ulterior motive, gives Adams another find that someone had thrown over the embassy's bridle: a supposedly ingenious, modern musical score that Kovacs plays the piano reluctantly at first, but then enthusiastically after realizing it must, how little the Americans can do with such modern music. Trust in one another begins to develop slowly. Tensions between the two governments are only resolved when the little one's parents are located. They are Olaf, the embassy's Swedish cook, and a woman from the host country who used to work here. Ambassador Adams now ensures in no time at all that marriage papers are issued to the parents, so that the toddler is considered a Swedish citizen and can leave the communist country with the parents in the direction of freedom. Adams' relationship with Sonja also soon goes beyond the purely official: both eventually become a couple.

== Cast ==
- Joseph Cotten as John Adams
- Eva Bartok as Sonja
- Bob Cunningham as Captain Heinikan
- René Deltgen as Kovak
- Gert Fröbe as Olaf
- Bruni Löbel as Lila
- Ursula Herking as Madame Debrov

== Production ==
It was filmed simultaneously in English- and German-language versions.

== See also ==
- 1955 in film
- List of comedy films of the 1950s
- List of German films 1945–1959
