= List of comedy films of the 1940s =

This is a list of comedy films released in the 1940s.

== American films ==
1940

- The Bank Dick
- The Ghost Breakers
- The Great Dictator
- The Great McGinty
- His Girl Friday
- My Favorite Wife
- My Little Chickadee
- One Night in the Tropics

1941

- Andy Hardy's Private Secretary
- Ball of Fire
- The Big Store
- The Bride Came C.O.D.
- Buck Privates
- The Devil and Miss Jones
- The Flame of New Orleans
- Great Guns
- Here Comes Mr. Jordan
- The Lady Eve
- Mr. & Mrs. Smith
- Never Give a Sucker an Even Break
- Nine Lives Are Not Enough
- That Night in Rio
- Topper Returns

1942

- The Man Who Came to Dinner
- The Major and the Minor
- My Sister Eileen
- The Palm Beach Story
- Rio Rita
- Road to Morocco
- Ship Ahoy
- Tales of Manhattan
- The Talk of the Town
- There's One Born Every Minute
- To Be or Not to Be
- Woman of the Year
- You Were Never Lovelier

1943

- Crazy House
- Du Barry Was a Lady
- Government Girl
- Heaven Can Wait
- Hello Frisco, Hello
- Hit the Ice
- I Dood It
- Jitterbugs
- A Lady Takes a Chance
- Mr. Lucky
- The More the Merrier
- A Night to Remember
- Slightly Dangerous
- They Got Me Covered
- Thousands Cheer
- Two Weeks to Live
- Whistling in Brooklyn

1944

- Arsenic and Old Lace
- Hail the Conquering Hero
- Lady in the Dark
- The Miracle of Morgan's Creek
- See Here, Private Hargrove
- Sensations of 1945
- Standing Room Only
- The Princess and the Pirate

1945

- Along Came Jones
- The Bullfighters
- Eadie Was a Lady
- The Horn Blows at Midnight
- Lady on a Train

1946

- Angel on My Shoulder
- The Great Morgan
- Little Giant
- Lover Come Back
- Monsieur Beaucaire
- A Night in Casablanca
- The Time of Their Lives
- Vacation in Reno
- Without Reservations

1947

- The Bachelor and the Bobby-Soxer (a.k.a. Bachelor Knight)
- Buck Privates Come Home
- Christmas Eve
- The Egg and I
- The Farmer's Daughter
- Miracle on 34th Street
- Monsieur Verdoux
- Road to Rio
- The Sin of Harold Diddlebock
- Suddenly, It's Spring
- The Voice of the Turtle
- Where There's Life

1948

- Abbott and Costello Meet Frankenstein
- The Emperor Waltz
- A Foreign Affair
- June Bride
- Mr. Blandings Builds His Dream House
- The Noose Hangs High
- One Touch of Venus
- The Paleface
- Sitting Pretty
- Variety Time

1949

- Adam's Rib
- Africa Screams
- Holiday Affair
- John Loves Mary
- I Was a Male War Bride
- It's a Great Feeling
- My Friend Irma

== British films ==
- Back-Room Boy (1942)
- The Black Sheep of Whitehall (1941)
- Blithe Spirit (1945)
- Caesar and Cleopatra (1945)
- Crook's Tour (1941)
- The Frozen Limits (1940)
- Gasbags (1940)
- The Ghost of St Michaels (1941)
- The Goose Steps Out (1942)
- He Snoops to Conquer (1944)
- Hoots Mon! (1940)
- Hue and Cry (1946)
- I Didn't Do It (1945)
- It's Not Cricket (1948)
- It's That Man Again (1943)
- Kind Hearts and Coronets (1949)
- Let George Do It! (1941)
- Major Barbara (1941)
- My Learned Friend (1943)
- On Approval (1943)
- Passport to Pimlico (1949)
- Somewhere in England (1940) (and subsequent series)
- Whisky Galore! (1948)

== Comedy horror ==
1940

- The Ghost Breakers

1941

- The Smiling Ghost

1944

- Zombies on Broadway

1948

- Abbott and Costello Meet Frankenstein

1949

- Abbott and Costello Meet the Killer, Boris Karloff

== Comedy drama ==
- Seven Gibbers (1940)
- That Gang of Mine (1940)
- Tugboat Annie Sails Again (1940)
- The Amazing Mrs. Holliday (1943)
- Salute to the Marines (1943)
- Three Wise Fools (1946)
- To Live in Peace (1947)
