= List of comedy films of the 1950s =

A list of comedy films released in the 1950s.

| Title | Director | Cast | Country | Subgenre/Notes |
|---|---|---|---|---|
1950
| Abbott and Costello in the Foreign Legion | | | United States | |
| Born Yesterday | | | United States | |
| Champagne for Caesar | | | United States | |
| Cheaper by the Dozen | | | United States | |
| Duchess of Idaho | | | United States | |
| Father of the Bride | | | United States | |
| The Great Rupert | | | United States | |
| Harvey | | | United States | |
| The Jackpot | | | United States | |
| Key to the City | | | United States | |
| Love Happy | | | United States | |
| My Friend Irma Goes West | | | United States | |
| Two Weeks with Love | | | United States | |
| The Happiest Days of Your Life | | | United Kingdom | |
1951
| Abbott and Costello Meet the Invisible Man | | | United States | |
| An American in Paris | | | United States | |
| Angels in the Outfield | | | United States | |
| Comin' Round the Mountain | | | United States | |
| Double Dynamite | | | United States | |
| Father's Little Dividend | | | United States | |
| Half Angel | | | United States | |
| My Favorite Spy | | | United States | |
| Lady Godiva Rides Again | | | United Kingdom | |
| Laughter in Paradise | | | United Kingdom | |
| The Lavender Hill Mob | | | United Kingdom | |
| The Man in the White Suit | | | United Kingdom | |
1952
| Abbott and Costello Meet Captain Kidd | | | United States | |
| Bela Lugosi Meets a Brooklyn Gorilla | | | United States | |
| A Girl in Every Port | | | United States | |
| Jumping Jacks | | | United States | |
| Lost in Alaska | | | United States | |
| Monkey Business | | | United States | |
| Road to Bali | | | United States | |
| Singin' in the Rain | | | United States | |
| Son of Paleface | | | United States | |
| The Quiet Man | | | United States; Ireland | Comedy drama |
| Curtain Up | | | United Kingdom | |
| The Card | | | United Kingdom | |
| The Importance of Being Earnest | | | United Kingdom | |
1953
| The Band Wagon | | | United States | |
| The Caddy | | | United States | |
| The Girls of Pleasure Island | | | United States | |
| How to Marry a Millionaire | | | United States | |
| The Moon Is Blue | | | United States | |
| Roman Holiday | | | United States | |
| Scared Stiff | | | United States | Comedy horror |
| Abbott and Costello Meet Dr. Jekyll and Mr. Hyde | | | United States | Comedy horror |
| Trouble Along the Way | | | United States | Comedy drama |
| Folly to be Wise | | | United Kingdom | |
| Genevieve | | | United Kingdom | |
| Our Girl Friday | | | United Kingdom | |
| The Captain's Paradise | | | United Kingdom | |
| The Maggie | | | United Kingdom | |
| The Oracle | | | United Kingdom | |
| The Titfield Thunderbolt | | | United Kingdom | |
| Trouble in Store | | | United Kingdom | |
| Innocents in Paris | | | United Kingdom | |
1954
| Casanova's Big Night | | | United States | |
| It Should Happen to You | | | United States | |
| Knock on Wood | | | United States | |
| Sabrina | | | United States | |
| Belles of St. Trinians | | | United Kingdom | |
| Doctor in the House | | | United Kingdom | |
| Happy Ever After | | | United Kingdom | |
| Hobson's Choice | | | United Kingdom | |
| Orders Are Orders | | | United Kingdom | |
| You Know What Sailors Are | | | United Kingdom | |
1955
| Abbott and Costello Meet the Mummy | | | United States | |
| The Seven Year Itch | | | United States | |
| Mister Roberts | | | United States | |
| My Sister Eileen | | | United States | |
| The Trouble with Harry | | | United States | |
| Abbott and Costello Meet the Mummy | | | United States | Comedy horror |
| Doctor at Sea | | | United Kingdom | |
| Geordie | | | United Kingdom | |
| The Case of the Mukkinese Battle Horn | | | United Kingdom | |
| The Ladykillers | | | United Kingdom | |
| To Paris with Love | | | United Kingdom | |
| Trouble in the Glen | | | United Kingdom | |
1956
| Bus Stop | | | United States | |
| The Court Jester | | | United States | |
| Forever, Darling | | | United States | |
| The Girl Can't Help It | | | United States | |
| Hollywood or Bust | | | United States | |
| Our Miss Brooks | | | United States | |
| Pardners | | | United States | |
| The Teahouse of the August Moon | | | United States | |
| An Alligator Named Daisy | | | United Kingdom | |
| Private's Progress | | | United Kingdom | |
| The Green Man | | | United Kingdom | |
| True as a Turtle | | | United Kingdom | |
1957
| The Delicate Delinquent | | | United States | |
| Funny Face | | | United States | |
| The Girl Most Likely | | | United States | |
| Joe Butterfly | | | United States | |
| Love in the Afternoon | | | United States | |
| Will Success Spoil Rock Hunter? | | | United States | |
| Jet Pilot | | | United States | Comedy drama |
| Barnacle Bill | | | United Kingdom | |
| Brothers in Law | | | United Kingdom | |
| Doctor at Large | | | United Kingdom | |
| Just My Luck | | | United Kingdom | |
| Lucky Jim | | | United Kingdom | |
| The Naked Truth | | | United Kingdom | |
| The Belles of St. Trinians | | | United Kingdom | |
| The Smallest Show on Earth | | | United Kingdom | |
| Up in the World | | | United Kingdom | |
1958
| Auntie Mame | | | United States | |
| Houseboat | | | United States | |
| The Matchmaker | | | United States | |
| Paris Holiday | | | United States | |
| Teacher's Pet | | | United States | |
| The Tunnel of Love | | | United States | |
| The Castle of the Monsters | | | Mexico | Comedy horror |
| Carlton-Browne of the F.O. | | | United Kingdom | |
| Carry On Admiral | | | United Kingdom | not part of the Carry On series |
| Carry On Sergeant | | | United Kingdom | |
| I Only Arsked | | | United Kingdom | |
| Indiscreet | | | United Kingdom | |
| Rockets Galore | | | United Kingdom | |
| The Navy Lark | | | United Kingdom | |
| The Horse's Mouth | | | United Kingdom | |
| The Captain's Table | | | United Kingdom | |
| Too Many Crooks | | | United Kingdom | |
| Up the Creek | | | United Kingdom | |
1959
| Alias Jesse James | | | United States | |
| A Bucket of Blood | | | United States | |
| Have Rocket, Will Travel | | | United States | |
| Pillow Talk | | | United States | |
| The Shaggy Dog | | | United States | |
| Some Like It Hot | | | United States | |
| Carry On Nurse | | | United Kingdom | |
| Carry On Teacher | | | United Kingdom | |
| Follow a Star | | | United Kingdom | |
| Further up the Creek | | | United Kingdom | |
| I'm All Right Jack | | | United Kingdom | |
| Idol on Parade | | | United Kingdom | |
| Left Right and Centre | | | United Kingdom | |
| Mon Oncle | Jacques Tati | | France | |
| Our Man in Havana | | | United Kingdom | |
| Operation Bullshine | | | United Kingdom | |
| The Bridal Path | | | United Kingdom | |
| The Mouse That Roared | | | United Kingdom | |
| The Night We Dropped a Clanger | | | United Kingdom | |
