= Carlos Clarens =

Carlos Clarens (1930–1987) was a film historian and writer on the cinema particularly noted for his sensitive, pioneering An Illustrated History of the Horror Film (1967, revised 1968). Having left Havana in his younger years, he made his mark in both Paris and New York, providing subtitles in the five languages with which he was fluent. One of the films he provided subtitles for was Franco Zeffirelli's La Traviata. He also worked as a production assistant for Jacques Demy and Robert Bresson while he was living in Paris. He was a film critic for The SoHo Weekly News.

Upon his death, tributes were held at New York's Little Theatre at the Public Theater, the Academy of Motion Picture Arts and Sciences and Paris' Cinematheque.

== Bibliography ==
- An Illustrated History of the Horror Film (1967)
- Cukor (1976)
- Crime Movies (1980)
