= An Illustrated History of the Horror Film =

- Author: Carlos Clarens
- Language: English
- Genre: Non-fiction, film
- Publisher: G. P. Putnam's Sons
- Publication date: 1967
- Publication place: United States
- Media type: Print
- Pages: 256

An Illustrated History of the Horror Film is a 1967 non-fiction book by film historian Carlos Clarens. In 1997, it was republished under the title An Illustrated History of Horror and Science-fiction Films: The Classic Era, 1895-1967.

== Content ==
An Illustrated History of the Horror Film is divided into a foreword, nine chapters, an appendix that includes credits for every film that is mentioned, an index, and numerous stills from some of the films that are discussed.

Chapter 1 explores Georges Méliès's contributions to cinema. Chapter 2 surveys German expressionist films from 1913's The Student of Prague to 1933's The Testament of Dr. Mabuse. Chapter 3 looks at American horror films from the earliest known examples of the 1900s to the ones that were made in the 1920s near the end of the silent era. Chapter 4 chronicles American horror films from 1928's The Terror to 1946's The Beast with Five Fingers. Chapter 5 analyzes Vampyr. Chapter 6 discusses Val Lewton's horror films and Dead of Night. Chapter 7 examines many science fiction films of the 1950s-1960s, particularly horrific ones that have to do with alien invasion, world destruction, and/or space travel. Chapter 8 looks at numerous kinds of horror and science fiction films of the 1950s-1960s from all over the world. Chapter 9 meditates on the science fiction film's evolution towards deeper philosophical themes and analyzes The Damned, The Birds, La Jetée, Alphaville, and Fahrenheit 451.

== Reception ==
Shortly after An Illustrated History of the Horror Film's release, R. C. Dale of Film Quarterly called it "the best history of the horror film now available in English." Dale noted that he disagreed with many of Clarens's evaluations, including Clarens's dismissal of Hammer Horror and praise of recent Mexican horror films, but concluded, "none of these differences of opinion lessens my admiration for Clarens's book as a chronology and general study."

In 2010, Kim Newman was asked by Sight & Sound to make a list of five of the most inspirational books about film ever written, and he included An Illustrated History of the Horror Film on his list, noting that it is "still a model of genre history/criticism."
