= Pod People (Invasion of the Body Snatchers) =

Fictional parasitic aliens

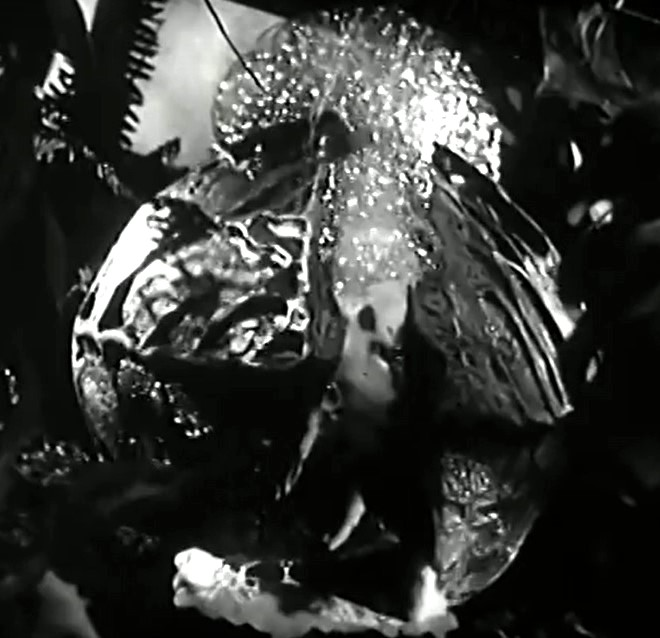
- A pod bursting and spawning a replica of a human (screenshot from the 1956 film)
- First appearance: The Body Snatchers; (1954 novel)
- Last appearance: The Invasion; (2007 film)
- Created by: Jack Finney
- Genre: Science fiction; Horror fiction

In-universe information
- Other names: Body snatchers; Blanks (Note: Referred to as such by the character Jack Belicec in The Body Snatchers)
- Type: Seedpod-like alien parasites; Alien virus (2007 version)
- Distinctions: Capable of replicating other organisms; Take physical and mental control of their host organisms (2007 version)

Pod people are a fictional extraterrestrial species and the titular main antagonists in the 1954 novel The Body Snatchers by Jack Finney, the 1956 film Invasion of the Body Snatchers, the 1978 remake of the same name, and the 1993 film Body Snatchers.

In most of their appearances, the pod people are portrayed as seedpods that hatch into replicas of any human sleeping in their vicinity, which they kill and replace. These replicas are physically flawless copies that retain the memories and habits of the original human, yet lack any emotion.

The success of the 1956 and 1978 film versions caused the term "pod people" to enter the popular American lexicon, with a pod person being slang for "a soulless conformist; someone who acts strangely, almost mechanically".

== Portrayals ==
=== The Body Snatchers ===
Pod people are a race of nomadic extraterrestrial parasites from a dying planet. Realizing their planet's resources are nearing depletion, the pods evolved the ability to defy gravity and leave their planet's atmosphere in the search of planets to colonize. For millennia, the pods floated in space like spores, propelled by the solar winds, some occasionally landing on inhabited planets. Upon landing, they replace the dominant species by spawning emotionless replicas; the original bodies disintegrate into dust after the duplication process. After consuming all the resources, the pods leave in search of other planets. Such a consumption was apparently the fate of civilizations inhabiting Mars and the Moon. The Pods' sole purpose is survival with no attention to the civilizations they conquer or the resources they squander. The duplicates have lifespans of five earth years, and cannot sexually reproduce. Their invasion of Earth was short; unable to overcome resistance to their actions, the pods abandoned Earth, leaving behind their duplicates, but those died quickly.

=== Film adaptations ===
==== Invasion of the Body Snatchers (1956 film) ====
One of the pod people hints at their extraterrestrial origin and purpose without explaining. Physician Miles Bennell, played by Kevin McCarthy, gets away from the town and tells his story to another doctor. A truck carrying pods is wrecked; thereafter, the second physician believes the tale. He asks the government agents to quarantine the town, but viewers are left to wonder whether they were successful. Prior to a rewrite, the ending was less hopeful about the fate of humanity, ending before McCarthy escapes. The final shot is Bennell standing on a highway shouting warnings at passing cars and into the camera.

==== Invasion of the Body Snatchers (1978 film) ====
The origin of the pod people clones in the 1978 film remains the same as in the first film adaptation. In this film, the aliens are in their preinvasion form. They appear as gelatinous creatures abandoning their ravaged planet somewhere in deep space. After landing on Earth, they assimilate leaves and become pink flowers; the aliens eventually grow the larger 6-foot-long (1.8 m) pods. This time, those subverted can scream in an eerie high-pitched alien voice, which is apparently used to alert other pod people of humans in their midst. They also seem to exhibit a kind of extrasensory perception. As one character stabs his almost-formed pod replacement, a replica immediately emits the alien scream.

This version does not end with the same hope as the novel and previous movie, but ends with the pod people taking over almost everyone on Earth. The movie shows several ships with pods to be sent out into other parts of the planet. In the closing scene, Veronica Cartwright's character is happy to see the hero, played by Donald Sutherland, only to hear him emit the alien scream.

A difference in the pods is seen between the original film and the remake. In the original, the pods burst to duplicate Miles and his friends while they are awake. In the remake, the pods and flowers stay dormant until the humans are asleep. The replicas are less emotional than the original, to the extent, except for "leader" replicas such as Dr Kibner, they do not appear to be able to fake emotional states and reactions. Also unclear is whether the replicas can eat, although one is seen drinking water in Elizabeth Driscoll's apartment.

==== Body Snatchers (1993 film) ====
As in the 1978 film, these pod people emit the high-pitched scream to indicate nonconverts. Their extraterrestrial origin is hinted (suggested through a pan-in of the galaxy during the opening credits, and a statement by the replica general they traveled "light-years"). The bodies of these pod people also shrivel and disintegrate after they are killed, similar to the originals. As in the 1978 remake, this third version seems to preclude any hopeful conclusion by the ambiguous ending in which the two leads land after seemingly destroying the pod people, only to find the pilot is apparently one of the aliens, reflecting back to the eerie warning: "There's no one like you left."

==== The Invasion (2007 film) ====
In The Invasion, the aliens are a virus. After the person falls asleep, the virus rewrites human DNA. Then, these genetically modified post-humans vomit a gelatinous substance to continue the invasion. As their invasion snowballs, the pod people transform humans by injecting them with the substance under the guise of "influenza vaccines". As it continues across the globe, local conflicts are resolved, including the Iraq War and Darfur. However, certain illnesses during childhood render humans immune to the viral invaders. Medical scientists somehow create a miracle vaccine in a few months to "cure the pandemic". The treatment wipes the memories of the replicas, and the infected live "as though they were in a deep sleep". Similar to previous incarnations, the virus can kill its human host. Carol takes a photograph of a human after conversion, but the conflicting memories give the replica a heart attack. During Carol and Gene's exchange on the commuter train:

Carol: Where are your parents Gene?
Gene: They didn't survive. Your family is my family now.

== As a metaphor ==
=== Communism ===
In 2012, American critic Dennis Lim wrote: "the pod people...have risen to the status of a modern American myth. In the movies at least, pod-dom has proved to be an eternally durable trope and an infinitely flexible metaphor". Lim argued the 1956 film can be understood as a metaphor for Communism or McCarthyism or both. Lim wrote that the pod people "...with their dead-eyed stares and moblike behavior, they could also be seen as embodying the most sinister tendencies of the Eisenhower-McCarthy era." The scholar Andrew Howe argued that the 1956 film presented the pod people as a metaphor for Communism, as the pod people appear to have a sort of collective mind whose precise workings are not explained in the film. In the 1950s, Americans tended to associate Communism with collectivism and their own nation with individualism. The pod people have absolutely no sense of individualism, instead being the soulless duplicates of people who once existed with no personalities and emotions, which reflected popular American stereotypes in the 1950s of life in Communist nations. The way that the pod people insist that their triumph is both necessary and inevitable is a parody of Marxism with its insistence that class conflict will inevitably end with the destruction of capitalism and the triumph of socialism in the form of "governing decisions by the proletariat". The manner in which the pod people outwardly resemble the people they have replaced, but are completely empty and soulless, reflected the viewpoint that the Communist regimes have destroyed the "real" nations that previously existed before they came to power and replaced the "authentic" national identities and cultures with something artificial and profoundly distasteful. Likewise, the particular place where the pods have landed in is a small town in rural California, meaning that Americans are the ones being targeted for replacement by the pod people, which served as a metaphor for how many Americans felt threatened by Communism, whose triumph was widely feared to be marking the end of the "real" America.

The critic Danny Pearl explained the metaphor of the pod people as:

The pod people represent a completely regimented society. Metaphorically, they are so alike as "two peas in a pod" because they have been sapped of their emotional individuality. The vegetarian metaphor literizes Red Scare rhetoric of the "growth" of Communism as well as the idea that revolutions are made by planting seeds. There is a scene where the pod people are assembled in the town square, where a loud speaker reads out the day's orders; it is the quintessential fifties image of socialism. And, of course, the simile that without freedom of thought people are...vegetables is a central theme of the narrative.

=== Conformism ===
American director Don Siegel, who directed the 1956 version, stated he saw the film as a parable about the eroding sense of individualism in American life, stating:

Many of my associates are certainly pods. They have no feelings. They exist, breathe, sleep. To be a pod means that you have no passion, no anger, the spark has left you...Of course, there's a very strong case for being a pod. These pods, who get rid of pain, ill health, and mental disturbances, are in a sense doing good. It happens to leave you in a very dull world, but that, by the way is the world most of us live in. It's the same as people who welcome going into the army or prison. There's regimentment, a lack of having to make up your mind, face decisions...People are becoming vegetables. I don't know what the answer is except an awareness of it. That's what makes a picture like The Invasion of the Body Snatchers important.

When reviewing the 1993 film, Roger Ebert, made a connection between "the Army's code of rigid conformity, and the behavior of the pod people, who seem like a logical extension of the same code". The German scholar Christian Knöppler wrote that the 1993 version seemed to be a critique of modern American life as the pod people succeed in taking over the Army base because of the military culture of conformity and succeed in replacing families because families are conformist, suggesting it was internal weakness already present that allowed their triumph and the pod invasion only intensifies preexisting trends.

=== Other interpretations ===
American director Philip Kaufman, who directed the 1978 version, has suggested that the pod people can be understood as a political metaphor, saying in 2018:

"It's as valid now as it was then, maybe more so...[Donald Sutherland's pod shriek] at the end of the film could be a very Trumpian scream. The way Trump points to the press in the back of the auditorium and everybody turns, you get that scary 'poddy' feeling. There's a kind of contagion that's going on here. ... Some of the best Republicans I know have moved away from being Republicans because there is a kind of a pod conformity and hysteria and looking down at more complex, compassionate, humanistic people. San Francisco is still viewed in that way by a lot of people, that it's somewhat outside of the 'pod-requisites' for the advancing of that kind of horrific civilization. I feel that poddiness has taken over a lot of our discourse. I don't want to make this a political diatribe on what's disturbing me in today's world, but it certainly is there."

== Bibliography ==
- Howe, Andrew (2015). "Monstrous Flora: Dangerous Cinematic Plants of the Cold War Era". In Patrícia Vieira; Monica Gagliano; John Charles Ryan (eds.). The Green Thread: Dialogues with the Vegetal World. Lanham: Lexington Books. pp. 147–166. ISBN 978-1498510608.
- Kay, Glenn (2008). Zombie Movies: The Ultimate Guide. Chicago: Chicago Review Press. ISBN 978-1569766835.
- Knöppler, Christian (2017). The Monster Always Returns: American Horror Films and Their Remakes. Bielefeld: transcript Verlag. ISBN 978-3839437353.
- Roman, James W (2009). Bigger Than Blockbusters: Movies that Defined America. Santa Monica: ABC-CLIO. ISBN 978-0313339950.
