= Body Snatchers (1993 film) =

1993 American film by Abel Ferrara

- Theatrical release poster
- Directed by: Abel Ferrara
- Screenplay by: Stuart Gordon; Dennis Paoli; Nicholas St. John
- Story by: Raymond Cistheri; Larry Cohen
- Based on: The Body Snatchers by Jack Finney
- Produced by: Robert H. Solo
- Starring: Gabrielle Anwar; Terry Kinney; Billy Wirth; Forest Whitaker; Meg Tilly
- Cinematography: Bojan Bazelli
- Edited by: Anthony Redman
- Music by: Joe Delia
- Production company: Dorset Productions; Robert H. Solo Productions
- Distributed by: Warner Bros.
- Release dates: May 15, 1993 (Cannes); January 14, 1994 (United States)
- Running time: 87 minutes
- Country: United States
- Language: English
- Budget: $12 million
- Box office: Domestic $428,868

Body Snatchers is a 1993 American science-fiction horror film directed by Abel Ferrara and starring Gabrielle Anwar, Billy Wirth, Terry Kinney, Meg Tilly, Christine Elise, R. Lee Ermey, and Forest Whitaker. The screenplay by Stuart Gordon, Dennis Paoli, and Nicholas St. John is loosely based on the 1955 novel The Body Snatchers by Jack Finney.

Body Snatchers is the third film adaptation of Finney's novel, the first being Invasion of the Body Snatchers in 1956, followed by a second adaptation of the same title in 1978. The plot is centered around the discovery that people working at a military base in Alabama are being replaced by duplicates grown from plant-like pods, indistinguishable from normal people except for their utter lack of emotion.

The film marked Ferrara's first venture into the science fiction genre as well as his first feature to receive a financial backing from a major film studio. Producer Robert H. Solo also produced the 1978 adaptation.

Body Snatchers was first screened in-competition at the Cannes Film Festival on May 15, 1993, and given a limited U.S. theatrical release on January 14, 1994. It received generally positive reviews from critics, who praised the likeliness, realism, and special effects, though it was criticized for its plot.

== Plot ==
Steve Malone, an agent from the Environmental Protection Agency, is sent to a U.S. Army base in Alabama to test possible effects on the surrounding ecological system caused by military actions. With him are Marti, his teenage daughter from his first marriage; Carol, his second wife; and Andy, Marti's half-brother. On their way to the base, they stop at a gas station. In the restroom, Marti is threatened by an MP with a knife. When he notices her fear, he warns, "They get you when you sleep", and lets her go.

Steve and his family move into their new home on the base, and Marti makes friends with the base commander's daughter Jenn. On his first day in day care, Andy runs away because he is recognized as an outsider among the other conformist children. He is picked up and brought home by helicopter pilot Tim. Marti and Tim are attracted to each other. While examining soil samples, Steve is asked by medical officer Major Collins if the toxicity of the environment could have caused an ongoing rash of people afraid to sleep and believing their loved ones are imposters.

In the evening, Marti and Jenn go to the bar attended by the station's military personnel, where they meet Tim and the MP who threatened Marti at the gas station. With no emotion, he denies that they ever met before. A group of soldiers pick giant pods from the river running by the base. When Andy wakes up and enters his mother's room, Carol's body crumbles to dust, while a naked soulless double emerges from the closet. Nobody believes Andy's story that his real mother is dead.

The following day, Steve witnesses an accidental injury on a soldier that makes no sense. Steve takes a sample from the injured soldier's suit and speaks to a friend over the phone about examining the specimen. That night, Marti falls asleep during a bath and tendrils emerging from the giant pods enter her mouth and nose. Carol coaxes Steve to sleep and tendrils enter him as well. Marti wakes, rips the tendrils from her face, rushes into Steve's room, and wakes him. The tendril removal causes doubles of Marti and Steve to collapse and dissolve. Carol attempts to convince Steve that the takeover is a good thing, claiming that it ends confusion and anger. She also claims that there is no place to go, as the events at the base are not an isolated incident. Steve, Marti, and Andy flee the house. Carol emits a mechanical scream that alerts other pod people. Now the majority, they swarm over the base chasing the remaining humans. Tim is attacked by his friends but escapes.

After hiding Marti and Andy in a warehouse, Steve enters Collins' office. The hysterical Major calls for help, but the line is blocked. A group of pod people arrive, led by base commander General Platt. While Steve hides, the pod people try to convince Collins that the individual is not important, and that only conformity can solve the world's problems. Collins shoots himself rather than live in such a world.

Steve returns to his children and says he found a way out. They drive aimlessly through the military base, as loudspeakers shout out instructions for spreading the invasion by carrying out pods in trucks. Realizing that her father was replicated while he was away, Marti swerves the car to the side and tries to escape with Andy. Tim arrives and Marti takes his gun and shoots the Steve duplicate. Pod-Steve's body shrinks into a mass of goo.

Tim gets hold of a helicopter gunship, but Marti and Andy are taken away by the pod people to the base infirmary, where the remaining human beings are being systematically duplicated by pods. Tim rescues Marti, despite her pod duplicate having already awakened. Marti and Tim leave the building, pretending to be pod people so they can get to Tim's helicopter to escape. Jenn greets them without emotion, but surreptitiously tells Marti she saw Andy looking for her. When Marti reacts with interest, Jenn alerts the other pod people. Tim and Marti get in the helicopter and Andy runs up to them. After taking off, Andy, who is actually a pod duplicate, tries to bring down the helicopter. After a scuffle, a heartbroken Marti throws Pod-Andy out of the helicopter to his death.

Tim destroys the base and the trucks filled with pods with the helicopter's rockets. While they land on another base, the words of Pod-Carol can be heard, suggesting that the phenomenon may have already spread beyond the army base.

== Cast ==
- Gabrielle Anwar as Marti Malone
- Terry Kinney as Steve Malone
- Billy Wirth as Tim Young
- Forest Whitaker as Maj. Matthew Collins
- Meg Tilly as Carol Malone
- Reilly Murphy as Andy Malone
- Christine Elise as Jenn Platt
- R. Lee Ermey as Gen. Platt
- Kathleen Doyle as Diana Platt
- G. Elvis Phillips as Pete
- Tonea Stewart as Mrs. Fitzpatrick

== Production ==
Body Snatchers was produced by Robert H. Solo who had previously produced the 1978 adaptation of the Jack Finney novel The Body Snatchers. Solo stated repeatedly that the film was not a remake as it was a different story and set of circumstances in comparison to prior versions which gave Solo added confidence as the actors in the age range of 16-25 had seen neither the 1956 or 1978 versions of the story. Solo further stated this version of Body Snatchers would have less political subtext and instead be more focused on the struggle for Individualism. The initial script was written by Stuart Gordon and Dennis Paoli. Gordon had initially been slated to direct the film, but instead left to direct Fortress.

Abel Ferrara was approached to do the film, which was his first film for a major studio. He took a liking to the original story and stated that his appreciation of the story was why he fought for the film rather than quit it. As related by Ferrara, "We started our film, already we’re far enough into the script where Warner Bros already had the idea of strangers in a military camp. You couldn’t come up with a worse place or a worse starting point for that film. We did the best we could; without telling the guys at Warner Bros, I was holding onto the original story, minus the narration....We had a lot of money and we were out in the middle of nowhere, so it was in the editing that it went south. Dede Allen was a really talented editor at Warners, in charge of all the editing for all the films. I mean, I butted heads, because I don’t like anybody telling me what to do. But, you know, we had a pretty good editor ourselves [Anthony Redman], and we were able to play a game well enough that… you’ve seen the film, right?...Right. I’m glad you like it – I like it too. But could it have been better? Sure. Would I like to do a remake of that? Yeah." Ferrara brought in his frequent collaborator Nicholas St. John to re-write the Gordon and Paoli script more toward Ferrara's style as the initial script leaned more in the direction of an over-the-top Splatter film.

Body Snatchers was filmed in the winter of 1991 at an abandoned military base in Selma, Alabama. It was the first film to be shot with Arriscope anamorphic lenses.

== Release ==
Originally slated for release in the fall of 1993, Warner Bros. Pictures released Body Snatchers to only a few dozen theaters on January 14, 1994, and consequently its domestic gross was a mere $428,868.

== Reception ==
Body Snatchers was shown in competition at the 1993 Cannes Film Festival, receiving very positive reviews from some critics. Roger Ebert considered it superior to the previous adaptations of Finney's famous novel and in his review gave it four stars out of four, praising it for psychological realism and social criticism. Ebert stated "as sheer moviemaking, it is skilled and knowing, and deserves the highest praise you can give a horror film: It works". Nick Shager of the horror film review site Lessons of Darkness said in his 2006 review of the film, "this economical horror show still offers a few stunning moments of paranoia-laced terror". Blake Davis of KFOR Channel 4 News said of the film: "One of the creepiest and most overlooked horror movies made in the past decade, featuring a strong, scary turn by Meg Tilly".

However, some critics panned the film — Richard Harrington of The Washington Post'' (February 18, 1994) called it "a soulless replica of Don Siegel's 1956 model and Philip Kaufman's 1978 update". Owen Gleiberman noted in Entertainment Weekly (February 11, 1994), "[the] notion of a military base as a symbol of mindless conformity isn't exactly revelatory, and the characters remain sketchy and underdeveloped."

Based on 33 reviews, the film holds a 70% on Rotten Tomatoes. The site's critics' consensus states: "Body Snatchers may not topple previous adaptions, but it boasts an effective sense of dread and strong characterizations."

== Analysis ==
The largest difference in this version of the story is that it takes place on an Army base in Alabama, unlike a small California town in the original novel and the first adaptation filmed in 1956, or in San Francisco like in the 1978 remake. While the first two films portrayed the tightly organized, conformist "pod society" invading a free civil society, Ferrara's film, according to Chicago Sun-Times film critic Roger Ebert, made a connection between "the Army's code of rigid conformity, and the behavior of the pod people, who seem like a logical extension of the same code".

Body Snatchers is the film which departs the farthest from the original novel, compared to the 1956 and 1978 versions. While Steve Malone, like the doctors Bennell in the earlier films, also has a medical/scientific profession, the main character in this film is his daughter Marti. The character of Becky/Elizabeth (Bennell's love interest and his companion during his escape attempt from the invaders) is dropped completely, as are Bennell's acquaintances and later antagonists Dr. Kaufman/Kibner and the Belicecs. Re-invented, however, are two elements which had been dropped from the 1978 version: A young boy (named Jimmy Grimaldi in the 1956 version, here Marti's half brother Andy) claims that his mother is not his "real" mother. Also, the film features a voice-over narration by the main character. Two ideas invented by the 1978 version are picked up here again: The mortal remains of the "original" human beings are picked up by garbage trucks, and the duplicates utter an otherworldly scream when they discover a genuine human, thereby calling assistance from other pod people.

The German scholar Christian Knöppler wrote that the 1993 version kept the same basic outline as the previous versions, but altered the story by making a rebellious teenage girl the protagonist while making the male doctor/scientist character who served as the protagonist in the previous versions a secondary character. The replacement of a male protagonist with a female one reflected a trend towards female protagonists in horror films in the 1980s-1990s, often known as the 'final girl' archetype. In many ways, the film tells an especially vicious coming-of-age narrative as Marti's family is destroyed and at the end all she has left is her boyfriend Tim. Knöppler noted that Marti's family was highly dysfunctional to begin with, and her killing the pod versions of her family members reflected a tendency towards rejecting her own family that was already present even before she encountered the "pod people". Knöppler noted that despite the strong female protagonist that there is "a noticeable undercurrent of monstrous femininity and sexuality" in the film as it is Carol and the other housewives at the Army base are replaced first and it is Carol who acts as the primary antagonist. The way that the pod version of Carol almost replaces Steve while trying to seduce him suggests a fear of women. Meg Tilly's performance as Carol evokes many of the stereotypes associated with malevolent femininity. Another example of a female antagonist is the short-lived pod version of Marti who appears nude before Tim, and notably he hesitates for a moment before killing her to save the real Marti, a scene that Knöppler sees as an expression of "male sexual insecurity" that reflects both a fear of and a desire for female bodies. Knöppler also noted that the 1993 version actually showed the replacement progress with a scene where a pod forces its tendrils into Marti's body as she struggles against them, a scene that powerfully evokes rape.

Knöppler argued that the film seemed to be a critique of modern American life as the pod people succeed in taking over the Army base because of the military culture of conformity and succeed in replacing families because families are conformist, suggesting it was internal weakness already present that allowed their triumph and the pod invasion only intensifies preexisting trends. Notably, the only characters who are not replaced are Tim and Marti, both of whom are non-conformists and rebels against conformist institutions, namely the military in the case of Tim and the family in the case of Marti. Knöppler noted that it is very telling that when Tim pretends to be a pod person, the only metaphor he can think of to describe the pod community is "one big happy family". Unlike other versions of The Invasion of the Body Snatchers, the Malone family is portrayed as dysfunctional and fractured at the start of the film, which was very far from the idealized nuclear families presented in the 1956 version. Likewise, the only other family presented in the film, the Platt family, are just as dysfunctional with General Platt a stern martinet, Mrs. Platt an alcoholic and Jen a rebellious teenager who is openly contemptuous of her parents. Knöppler noted that one can trace the perceived decline of the American family over the three versions of The Invasion of the Body Snatchers. In the 1956 version, more or less happy nuclear families were presented as the norm; early on in the 1978 version the character of Dr. Kibner declares that "the nuclear family is shot to hell"; and in the 1993 version broken and dysfunctional families were presented as the norm. The fact that Carol is replaced first literalizes the resentment felt by Marti towards her step-mother who has already "invaded" her family. Some critics see the character of Steve as the "beleaguered male" archetype popular in 1990s films trying to hold together his family which is fractured first by Marti's rebellion and then by Carol being replaced. However, the fact that Marti is the likeable protagonist while Steve notably fails in protecting his family undercuts this reading

Knöppler also noted that the first film was set in an idealized small town in California while the second film was set in San Francisco, both of which were fairly general representations of American life while the third film chosen to focus on a subculture by moving the story to an U.S. Army base in the South. He argued that by this change in settling the film moved from a critique of American life in general to a critique of a subculture. The Army base is a closed community with a fixed hierarchy and a highly conformist culture, and the film seems to suggest that "...the military mentality makes it impossible to distinguish those who are professional soldiers from those who are pods". One critic sums up the film's attitude as: "It is perhaps an oversimplification to say Body Snatchers treats America's armed forces with the complete and total contempt they deserve, but to a large degree it is true". The only exceptions are Major Collins, the base's doctor, and Tim, a slightly non-conformist helicopter pilot. Tim has killed people during the Gulf War of 1991, but he is portrayed as a sensitive type who is not entirely comfortable with what he has done. Throughout the film, the soldiers at the base appear both conformist and generally threatening, and their faces are usually obscured by dim lighting, limiting their individuality. Likewise, in the scene where the pod version of General Platt confronts Dr. Collins, the former promotes a version of the world without individuality as the best way to end conflict while the pod people say in chorus: "it's the race that's important, not the individual". The emphasis on the collective and "the race" subtly evokes fascism. The way that Collins shouts back "the individual is always important" before he shoots himself elevates the question of collectivism vs. individualism to an existential level.

Unlike the previous versions, intellectuals are portrayed more favorably with the scientist Steve and Dr. Collins sounding the alarm while the main spokesman for the pod people is General Platt. Knöppler suggests that both the film's intellectuals prove to be ineffectual reflects the film's general distrust of experts. In the 1978 version, Leonard Nimoy, an actor associated with "benevolent rationality" characters was cast as the main spokesman for the pod people while in the 1993 version, R. Lee Ermey, an actor associated with playing "abusive military authority" characters played the analogous role. In the first and second films, the main spokesmen for the pod people were men who previously been psychiatrists, suggesting a fear of psychiatry with its power to mold minds. Knöppler argued that the relatively more favorable picture of intellectuals was due to the fact in the previous versions it was the "pure rationality" of the pod people associated with science and intellectualism that was their main characteristic while in the 1993 version it was their conformity and collectivism that was their main characteristic. However, despite the film's anti-militarism, the conclusion of the film where Tim and Marti wage all-out war against the pod people which Marti justifies in her narration as being "only human" suggests a military response is the only rational one to the invasion of the pod people and appears to be imply that war is a natural part of the human condition.

== Unproduced sequel ==
According to Stuart Gordon, producer Robert H. Solo intended to follow up the film with sequels including a direct one to be set in Washington, D.C. Ultimately no sequels were produced, and a new adaptation was released in 2007.

== See also ==
- List of science fiction horror films
- List of American films of 1993
