= Clews =

Clews or CLEWS may refer to:

- Clew, a part of a sail
- Clews (duo), an Australian pop music duo
- Clews (surname), a list of people with the surname
- Clews Competition Motorcycles, a British motorcycle manufacturer
- Climate, Land, Energy and Water Strategies (or Systems), developed for the Rio+20 conference and now assisting the UN Sustainable Development Goals (SDGs) process

== See also ==
- Clewes
