= Terry Rawlings =

British film and sound editor (1933–2019)

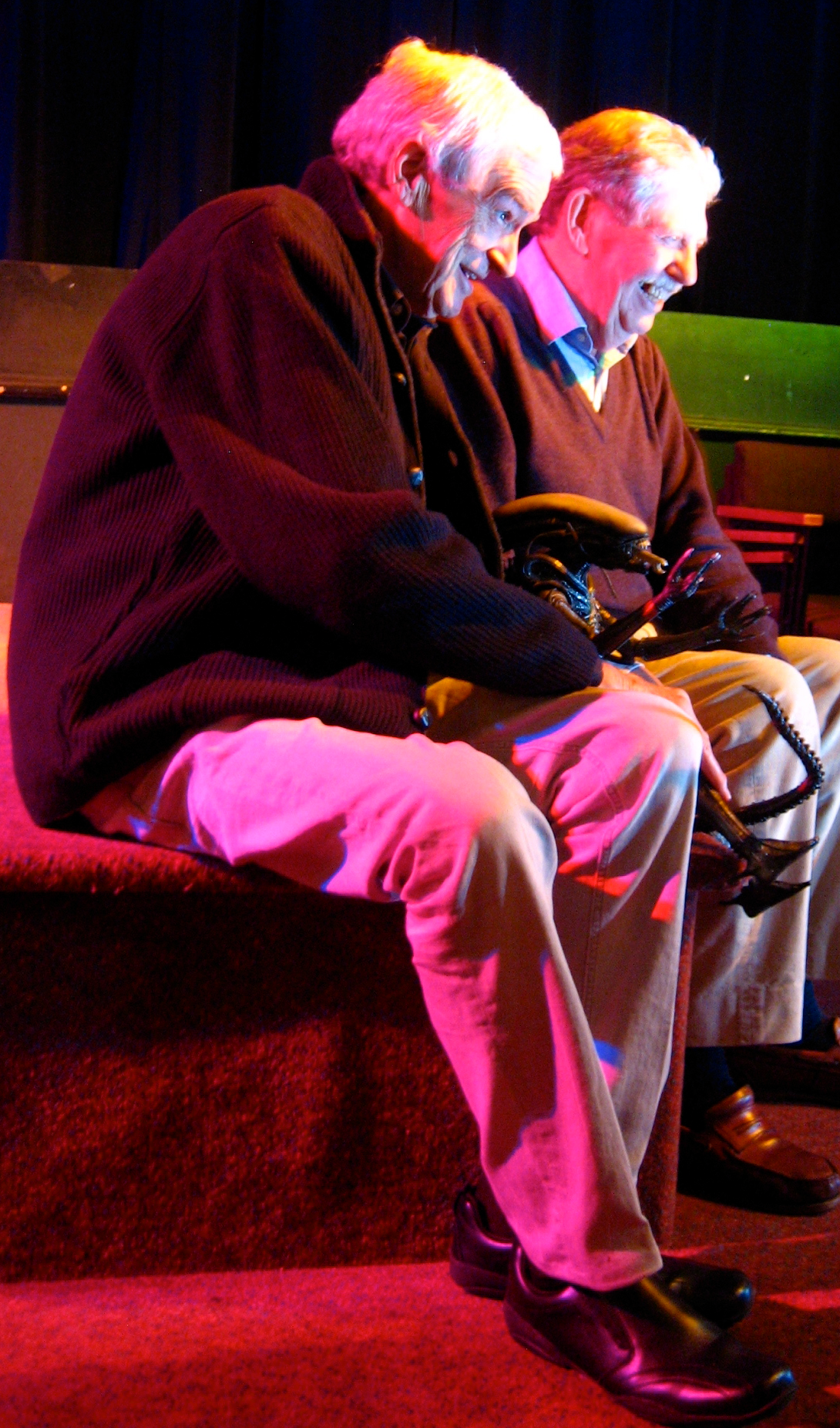
- Rawlings (foreground) and John Mollo in 2009
- Born: Terence Rawlings; 4 November 1933; London, England
- Died: 23 April 2019 (aged 85); Borehamwood, Hertfordshire, England
- Occupations: Film editor; sound editor
- Years active: 1962–2004
- Awards: American Cinema Editors; 2006 Career Achievement Award

Terence Rawlings (4 November 1933 – 23 April 2019) was an English film and sound editor. With over 70 feature film credits between 1962 and 2004, he was most noted for his work with directors such as Ridley Scott, Ken Russell, and Martin Campbell.

Rawlings was nominated on six occasions for the BAFTA Award for Best Editing, as well as Academy Award nomination for his work on Chariots of Fire (1981). The Motion Picture Editors Guild described him as “the ‘phantom’ hand behind great movies.”

== Career ==
A founding member of the Guild of British Film and Television Editors, Rawlings was also elected to membership in the American Cinema Editors, and received the organization's 2006 Career Achievement Award. He was nominated for an Oscar for his work on Chariots of Fire and for BAFTAs for both Alien and Blade Runner.

== Personal life and death ==
He lived in north London with his wife. He died at his home in Hertfordshire on 23 April 2019, at the age of 85.

== Filmography ==
- The Sentinel (1977)
- Watership Down (1978)
- Alien (1979)
- The Awakening (1980)
- Chariots of Fire (1981)
- Blade Runner (1982) (credited as "supervising editor". Despite being the film's editor, British citizen Rawlings was not allowed a full editor credit because he did not belong to an American film labor union)
- Yentl (1983)
- Legend (1985)
- F/X (1986)
- White of the Eye (1987)
- The Lonely Passion of Judith Hearne (1987)
- Slipstream (1989)
- Bullseye! (1990)
- Not Without My Daughter (1991)
- Alien 3 (1992)
- No Escape (1994)
- Trapped in Paradise (1994)
- GoldenEye (1995)
- The Saint (1997)
- U.S. Marshals (1998)
- Entrapment (1999)
- The Musketeer (2001)
- The Core (2003)
- The Phantom of the Opera (2004)

== Awards and honours ==
- 1970 - Nominated for BAFTA Award for Best Sound Track for Isadora and Women in Love.
- 1980 - Nominated for BAFTA Award for Best Editing for Alien.
- 1982 - Nominated for BAFTA and Academy Award for Best Film Editing for Chariots of Fire.
- 1983 - Nominated for BAFTA Award for Best Film Editing for Blade Runner.
- 2003 - Won DVDX Award for Best Audio Commentary (shared with Ridley Scott, Ronald Shusett, Sigourney Weaver, Tom Skerritt, Veronica Cartwright, Harry Dean Stanton and John Hurt)
- 2006 - Received the American Cinema Editors Career Achievement Award.
