= 2005 Webby Awards =

US internet awards ceremony

The ninth annual 2005 Webby Awards ceremony was held in New York City on June 8, 2005. It was hosted by comedian Rob Corddry, and judging took place covering 4,300 sites from more than 40 countries by the International Academy of Digital Arts and Sciences. Al Gore was awarded a lifetime achievement award and for his five-word acceptance speech he delivered the frequently-cited line, "Please don't recount this vote" – a reference to the 2000 Florida election recount.

== Nominees and winners ==
()

Category	Winner	People's Voice winner	Other nominees
Activism	World Citizen's Guide (Archived 6 June 2005 via Wayback); InSite Interactive	IFAW (Archived 8 June 2005 via Wayback); Kintera	The Great Divide Website (Archived 8 June 2005 via Wayback); Newdle Strategic Media
Activism	World Citizen's Guide (Archived 6 June 2005 via Wayback); InSite Interactive	IFAW (Archived 8 June 2005 via Wayback); Kintera	The Migration Information Source (Archived 9 June 2005 via Wayback); Migration Policy Institute
Activism	World Citizen's Guide (Archived 6 June 2005 via Wayback); InSite Interactive	IFAW (Archived 8 June 2005 via Wayback); Kintera	Voices of Civil Rights (Archived 7 June 2005 via Wayback); AARP
Art	Graffiti Archaeology (Archived 9 June 2005 via Wayback); Graffiti Archaeology	WordCount / Tracking the Way We Use Language (Archived 8 June 2005 via Wayback); Number 27	Electric Sheep (Archived 8 June 2005 via Wayback); SPOTWORKS
Art	Graffiti Archaeology (Archived 9 June 2005 via Wayback); Graffiti Archaeology	WordCount / Tracking the Way We Use Language (Archived 8 June 2005 via Wayback); Number 27	Horizons: Canadian and Russian Landscape Painting (1860-1940) (Archived 8 June 2005 via Wayback); Canadian Heritage Information Network / Virtual Museum of Canada
Art	Graffiti Archaeology (Archived 9 June 2005 via Wayback); Graffiti Archaeology	WordCount / Tracking the Way We Use Language (Archived 8 June 2005 via Wayback); Number 27	Tate Online (Archived 8 June 2005 via Wayback); Tate
Best Practices	Google (Archived 8 June 2005 via Wayback); Google		HBO: Ali G micro site (Archived 7 June 2005 via Wayback); Glow Interactive
Best Practices	Google (Archived 8 June 2005 via Wayback); Google		NetSmartz Kids (Archived 6 June 2005 via Wayback); NetSmartz Workshop
Best Practices	Google (Archived 8 June 2005 via Wayback); Google		PBS FRONTLINE/World (Archived 8 June 2005 via Wayback); FRONTLINE/World
Best Practices	Google (Archived 8 June 2005 via Wayback); Google		The Merck Manual—Second Home Edition Online (Archived 8 June 2005 via Wayback); Merck & Co, Inc.
Broadband	Elevator Moods (http://www.elevatormoods.com); Betaville/EMIC	Headline History (Archived 5 June 2005 via Wayback); Northcliffe Electronic Publishing	AdCritic.com (Archived 8 June 2005 via Wayback); AdCritic.com
Broadband	Elevator Moods (http://www.elevatormoods.com); Betaville/EMIC	Headline History (Archived 5 June 2005 via Wayback); Northcliffe Electronic Publishing	Capote Circus (Archived 11 April 2005 via Wayback); National Film Board of Canada
Broadband	Elevator Moods (http://www.elevatormoods.com); Betaville/EMIC	Headline History (Archived 5 June 2005 via Wayback); Northcliffe Electronic Publishing	CBC Radio 3 (Archived 8 June 2005 via Wayback); CBC
Games	Metaphorical.net (Archived 7 June 2005 via Wayback); Metaphorical.net	Miniclip (Archived 8 June 2005 via Wayback); Miniclip Limited	Hot Shot Business (Archived 20 April 2005 via Wayback); Disney Online
Games	Metaphorical.net (Archived 7 June 2005 via Wayback); Metaphorical.net	Miniclip (Archived 8 June 2005 via Wayback); Miniclip Limited	Myst Revelations Web Site (Archived 9 June 2005 via Wayback); Ubisoft, Inc.
Games	Metaphorical.net (Archived 7 June 2005 via Wayback); Metaphorical.net	Miniclip (Archived 8 June 2005 via Wayback); Miniclip Limited	Spooks 3 Games - The Grid (Archived 25 May 2005 via Wayback); Preloaded
Games-Related	i love bees (Halo 2 Promotion) (Archived 8 June 2005 via Wayback); 4orty2wo Entertainment	GameSpot (Archived 8 June 2005 via Wayback); CNET Networks	GameSpy (Archived 8 June 2005 via Wayback); IGN Entertainment
Games-Related	i love bees (Halo 2 Promotion) (Archived 8 June 2005 via Wayback); 4orty2wo Entertainment	GameSpot (Archived 8 June 2005 via Wayback); CNET Networks	Metacritic (Archived 7 June 2005 via Wayback); Metacritic Inc.
Games-Related	i love bees (Halo 2 Promotion) (Archived 8 June 2005 via Wayback); 4orty2wo Entertainment	GameSpot (Archived 8 June 2005 via Wayback); CNET Networks	The Legend of Zelda: The Minish Cap (Archived 17 June 2005 via Wayback); POP
Humor	Rathergood (Archived 8 June 2005 via Wayback); Rathergood.com	Eddie Izzard (Archived 8 June 2005 via Wayback); Clock ltd	National Lampoon (Archived 8 June 2005 via Wayback); National Lampoon
Humor	Rathergood (Archived 8 June 2005 via Wayback); Rathergood.com	Eddie Izzard (Archived 8 June 2005 via Wayback); Clock ltd	The Subservient Chicken (Archived 8 June 2005 via Wayback); Crispin Porter + Bogusky
Humor	Rathergood (Archived 8 June 2005 via Wayback); Rathergood.com	Eddie Izzard (Archived 8 June 2005 via Wayback); Clock ltd	Four Word Film Review (Archived 8 June 2005 via Wayback); The four word film review
Sports	WhatIfSports (Archived 8 June 2005 via Wayback); WhatIfSports.com, Inc.	ESPN.com (Archived 13 June 2005 via Wayback); ESPN	BBC Sport (Archived 14 June 2005 via Wayback); BBC Sport
Sports	WhatIfSports (Archived 8 June 2005 via Wayback); WhatIfSports.com, Inc.	ESPN.com (Archived 13 June 2005 via Wayback); ESPN	Marmot - Climb Sepu (Archived 27 April 2005 via Wayback) texturemedia
Sports	WhatIfSports (Archived 8 June 2005 via Wayback); WhatIfSports.com, Inc.	ESPN.com (Archived 13 June 2005 via Wayback); ESPN	Mavericks Surf Contest (Archived 8 June 2005 via Wayback); Bolt Media
