= The Body Snatchers =

1954 science fiction novel by Jack Finney

- First edition cover illustrated by John McDermott
- Author: Jack Finney
- Genre: Science fiction
- Publisher: Dell Books
- Publication date: 1955
- Publication place: United States
- Media type: Print (paperback )
- Pages: 191 pp
- OCLC: 7148659
- LC Class: PS3556.I52

The Body Snatchers is a science fiction horror novel by American writer Jack Finney, originally serialized in Collier's magazine in November–December 1954 and published in book form the following year.

== Plot ==
The novel describes the town of Mill Valley, in California's Marin County, being invaded by seeds that have drifted to Earth from space. The seeds, grown from plantlike pods, replace sleeping people with perfect physical duplicates with all the same knowledge, memories, scars, etc. but incapable of human emotion or feeling. The human victims disappear forever.

The duplicates live only five years and cannot sexually reproduce; consequently, if unstopped, they will quickly turn Earth into a dead planet and move on to the next world. One of the duplicate invaders claims this is what humans do – use up resources, wipe out indigenous populations, and destroy ecosystems in the name of survival.

== Adaptations ==
The novel has been adapted for the screen four times; the first film, Invasion of the Body Snatchers in 1956, the second in 1978, the third in 1993, and the fourth in 2007. It was also the basis of the 1998 movie The Faculty and the 2019 movie Assimilate.

Unlike the first three film adaptations, which elected for darker, far more dystopian narratives (particularly the 1978 version), the novel contains an optimistic ending, with the aliens voluntarily vacating after deciding that they cannot tolerate the type of resistance they see in the main characters and leaving behind a small population of duplicates who die shortly after.

== Critical reception ==
The novel is often compared to The Puppet Masters by Robert Heinlein, published three years earlier.

In 1967, Damon Knight criticized the novel's scientific incoherence:

The seed pods, says Finney, drifted across interstellar space to Earth, propelled by light pressure. This echoes a familiar notion, the spore theory of Arrhenius. But the spores referred to are among the smallest living things – small enough to be knocked around by hydrogen molecules...In confusing these minute particles with three-foot seed pods, Finney invalidates his whole argument – and makes ludicrous nonsense of the final scene in which the pods, defeated, float up into the sky to hunt another planet.

Under Jack Finney's entry in The Science Fiction Encyclopedia, John Clute remarks concerning the novel:

Horrifyingly depicts the invasion of a small town by interstellar spores that duplicate human beings, reducing them to dust in the process; the menacing spore-people who remain symbolize, it has been argued, the loss of freedom in contemporary society. Jack Finney's further books are slickly told but less involving.

Galaxy reviewer Groff Conklin faulted the original edition, declaring that "Too many s-f novels lack outstanding originality, but this one lacks it to an outstanding degree." F&SF reviewer Anthony Boucher found it to be "intensely readable and unpredictably ingenious" despite noticeable inconsistencies and its sometimes lack of scientific accuracy. Astounding Science-Fiction reviewer P. Schuyler Miller reported that, once Finney sets out his premise, the novel becomes "a straight chase yarn, with several nice gimmicks and a not entirely convincing denouement."

== Editions ==
=== First edition ===
- Finney, Jack (c. 1955). The Body Snatchers. New York: Dell Publishing.
- Finney, Jack (1955). The Body Snatchers. London: Eyre & Spottiswoode.

=== Revised edition ===
- Finney, Jack (1978). The Body Snatchers. New York: Dell Publishing.

=== Photonovel ===
- Finney, Jack (1979). The Body Snatchers. Los Angeles: California: Fotonovel Publications. It features 350 color stills from the 1978 remake

== See also ==
- The Day of the Triffids (1951), a science fiction novel by English author John Wyndham, involving tall venomous carnivorous plants capable of locomotion and communication
- The Puppet Masters (1951), a science fiction novel by Robert A. Heinlein in which a trio of American government agents attempts to thwart a covert invasion of Earth by mind-controlling alien parasites
- It Came from Outer Space (1953), a film based on a Ray Bradbury original story treatment "The Meteor", which involves an alien invasion wherein humans are duplicated by the aliens
- "The Father-thing" (December 1954), a short story by Philip K. Dick, appearing in the Magazine of Fantasy and Science Fiction, uses the ideas of pods duplicating humans and fire being the means of destroying the pods
- Quatermass II (1955), a British science-fiction serial that shows an alien invasion by mind-controlling parasites inside meteorites.
- "The Dark Brotherhood", a short story in the collection The Dark Brotherhood and Other Pieces, written as a collaboration between by H. P. Lovecraft and August Derleth sometime before Lovecraft's death in 1937 but not released until 1966. The story deals with extraterrestrial creatures who possess human beings.
- Contamination (1980) a science fiction horror film that revisits parts of the novel
- Invasion of the Pod People (2007), a mockbuster film from The Asylum intended to coincide with the premiere of the 2007 film The Invasion
- The Host (2008), a novel by Stephenie Meyer that depicts a world wherein the human population has already been taken over by parasitic aliens
- Capgras delusion, a real psychiatric disorder which causes people to believe people are being replaced by identical duplicates
