= Clews (surname) =

Clews is a surname. Notable people with the surname include:

- Benj Clews, founder of the website Four Word Film Review
- Charles Clews (1919–2009), Maltese comedian
- Gaylene Clews, Australian runner; former wife of Robert de Castella
- Henry Clews (1836–1923), American financier
- Paul Clews (born 1979), British speedway rider
- Richard Clews, English musician; member of the Michael Nyman Band
- Vince Clews, (1943- ), American author, creator "Consumer Survival Kit" (PBS)

== See also ==
- Elsie Clews Parsons (1875–1941), American anthropologist
