= The Awakening (1980 film) =

1980 British horror film

- U.S. theatrical release poster
- Directed by: Mike Newell
- Written by: Chris Bryant; Allan Scott; Clive Exton
- Story by: Chris Bryant; Allan Scott
- Based on: The Jewel of Seven Stars (1903 novel) by Bram Stoker
- Produced by: Robert H. Solo
- Starring: Charlton Heston; Susannah York; Jill Townsend; Stephanie Zimbalist
- Cinematography: Jack Cardiff
- Edited by: Terry Rawlings
- Music by: Claude Bolling
- Production companies: EMI Films; Solofilm
- Distributed by: Columbia-EMI-Warner (UK); Orion Pictures (US)
- Release dates: 31 October 1980 (US); 21 November 1980 (UK)
- Running time: 105 minutes (UK); 101 minutes (US)
- Country: United Kingdom; United States
- Language: English
- Budget: US$6 million
- Box office: US$8.4 million

The Awakening is a 1980 supernatural horror film directed by Mike Newell in his feature directorial debut, and starring Charlton Heston, Susannah York, and Stephanie Zimbalist. The film follows an archeologist whose daughter becomes possessed by an ancient Egyptian queen. It is the third film version of Bram Stoker's 1903 novel The Jewel of Seven Stars, following the 1970 television adaptation as The Curse of the Mummy for the TV series Mystery and Imagination, and the 1971 theatrical film by Hammer, Blood from the Mummy's Tomb (in which Ahmed Osman also appeared).

A co-production between the United Kingdom and the United States, the film was shot in England and Egypt in 1979. It was released by Orion Pictures, then a subsidiary of Warner Bros. Pictures, premiering in the United States on Halloween 1980. The film earned $8.4 million at the U.S. box office, and received generally poor reviews.

Two different cuts of The Awakening exist: Newell's original cut, running approximately 105 minutes, which was released in the United Kingdom; and a shorter cut edited by Monte Hellman, running approximately 101 minutes, which was released in North America under mandate from Warner Bros.

== Plot ==
The film opens on an Egyptian archaeological dig in 1961. Three of the main characters are introduced: Matthew Corbeck, his wife Anne, and Jane Turner. Matthew and Jane are discussing their efforts to uncover the tomb of an ancient Egyptian queen. Anne is distressed by the relationship between her husband and his assistant. It is later proved that her distress is justified.

Matthew and Jane discover a long-hidden tomb that bears an inscription: "Do Not Approach the Nameless One Lest Your Soul Be Withered." They continue on to venture into the burial chamber of Queen Kara. As Matthew prepares to breach the entrance, Anne begins a painful premature labour. Matthew and Jane return to the camp and find Anne lying on the floor in a trance-like state. Matthew takes her to hospital and leaves her there so that he can return to the dig. Anne's pregnancy ends in stillbirth. As Matthew and Jane open the mummy's sarcophagus, the stillborn infant is restored to life. Matthew neglects his wife and daughter Margaret, and Anne takes the baby and leaves him.

Eighteen years later, Matthew is a professor at a British university and married to Jane. He learns that traces of bacteria have been found on Kara's mummy that threaten to destroy it and tries to have the mummy brought back to England to preserve it. One of the Egyptian specialists opposing Matthew is killed in a freak accident, allowing him to transport the mummy to England. Margaret, now eighteen (the age of Queen Kara when she died), goes to England to meet her father against her mother Anne's wishes. Matthew and Jane tell Margaret about Kara, the violent murders she committed and the myth that she could reincarnate herself.

Matthew's obsession with Kara grows and Margaret exhibits personality changes. People who resist Matthew and Margaret mysteriously and violently die. Margaret begins to notice the changes in herself and believes she is the one responsible for the deaths. While visiting Kara's tomb in Egypt, she and her father discover the Canopic jars that contain Kara's organs. Matthew secretly brings the jars back to England, eager to attempt a ritual to resurrect the ancient queen. He believes that Kara's spirit possessed his daughter at the moment of her birth, and that she intends to resurrect herself through the girl's body. He proposes that the only way to save Margaret, who has fallen into a coma, is to perform the ritual over Kara's mummy in the British Museum. He realises too late that Kara tricked him, and that the ritual enabled her to completely take over Margaret's body. The reincarnated Kara kills Matthew, her future intentions unknown.

== Cast ==
- Charlton Heston as Matthew Corbeck
- Susannah York as Jane Turner
- Jill Townsend as Anne Corbeck
- Stephanie Zimbalist as Margaret Corbeck
- Patrick Drury as Paul Whittier
- Bruce Myers as Dr. Khalid
- Nadim Sawalha as Dr. El Sadek
- Ian McDiarmid as Dr. Richter
- Ahmed Osman as Yussef
- Miriam Margolyes as Dr. Kadira
- Michael Mellinger as Hamid
- Leonard Maguire as John Matthews
- Ishia Bennison as Nurse
- Madhav Sharma as Doctor
- Chris Fairbanks as Porter
- Michael Halphie as Doctor

== Production ==
=== Development ===
The film was announced in July 1979. Its screenplay by Chris Bryant, Allan Scott, and Clive Exton was adapted from the Bram Stoker novel The Jewel of Seven Stars. The film's original title was The Waking.

Finance came from EMI Films in Britain and the newly-formed Orion Films in the US.

=== Casting ===
Charlton Heston was cast in the film's lead role, after having previously declined an offer to star in The Omen (1976). He joked that he took the part "to renew my franchise on being the only American actor allowed to play an Englishman." Heston said "there's a tremendous amount of interest in Egypt right now so I think our timing is good."

=== Filming ===
Principal photography of The Awakening began as early as August 1979 on a budget of approximately $6 million. Filming largely took place in England, though the actors also spent approximately one month shooting on location in Luxor, Egypt. Filming took place at the Valley of the Kings, as well as the City of the Dead in Cairo. The filmmakers were also granted permission to film inside the Egyptian Museum in Cairo, marking the first time a feature film was allowed to shoot on the premises. Studio filming was completed at Elstree Studios in Hertfordshire, along with location photography at University College London, whose interiors doubled for those of the British Museum. $250,000 of the budget went to recreating the British museum.

Director Mike Newell later said the production of the film was "utterly terrible" although he "adored" working with Heston. Newell recalled about Heston, "He's a great big [star]. 'He would come to all the rushes. He was at rushes every day."

=== Post-production ===
After Newell failed to have his 105-minute final cut of the film approved by Orion for its North American release, Monte Hellman was hired to re-cut the film. Hellman spent approximately two months in the summer of 1980 revising Newell's final edit. In the United Kingdom and Europe, Newell's original cut was released, but Hellman's cut was officiated and released in the United States and Canada, running approximately five minute shorter.

Hellman recalled, "I was not given any instructions by Orion — only make it play better and be more scary and exciting. There were probably many small trims, a few frames here and there, to tighten the pace, which is what I was supposed to do." He created a "voice" for the mummy and changed sound in other way. Hellman added: "remember there was a lot of waiting on decisions from higher up, and I also remember many days when I only worked for an hour or so. I should add that I had tremendous respect for Mike Newell, and tried not to destroy his intent. I spoke to him several times re what I was doing."

Newell later remarked that he found the alternate cut of the film to be "miserable in the sense that it got recut by a very, very nice man, Monte Hellman."

== Release ==
The Awakening was theatrically released in the United States on Halloween 1980 by Orion Pictures, through Warner Bros. Pictures. In England, it had its premiere in London on 21 November 1980.

=== Home media ===
In 1981, Warner Home Video released The Awakening on VHS in North America. In the United Kingdom, the film was also released to home video, though only in Hellman's shorter 101-minute cut, despite the fact that Newell's original cut had been distributed there theatrically.

The film was released on DVD by Studio Canal on 25 June 2007. It was later released by the Warner Archive Collection on 15 May 2012, featuring the revised 101-minute North American cut. Scream Factory issued a Blu-ray edition on 15 June 2021, also featuring the North American cut of the film. The Australian label Imprint Films subsequently released a Blu-ray on 6 August 2021, which features Newell's original 105-minute cut.

== Reception ==
=== Box office ===
The Awakening earned $2,728,520 during its opening weekend in the United States in 909 theaters. It concluded its theatrical run with a total gross of $8,415,112. Due to its marginal profitability, the film was regarded as a financial failure.

=== Critical response ===
==== Contemporary ====
Kevin Thomas of the Los Angeles Times was unimpressed by the film, describing it as "so complete and rigorously inconsistent that it attains that kind of negative perfection which invites laughter upon laughter," adding that the actors approach the material so seriously that the film becomes progressively "hilarious." The Spokesman-Review's Richard Freedman also found the film unintentionally humorous and lacking in suspense, noting that it "is bound to put audiences to sleep," later including it in a list of the ten worst films of the year. Ed Arnone of The Olympian criticized the film's script for being too "obvious" and remarked its lack of suspense, adding that the film "seems like nothing more than a pathetic attempt to cash in on some of the popularity of the King Tut exhibit which toured the U.S. last year."

Rex Reed, writing for the New York Daily News, felt that the film was a "cheap jack-hammer ripoff" of other mummy films, but conceded that Heston and York's performances "give it class." Janet Maslin of The New York Times praised the film's visuals and Egyptian sets, and found the performances convincing despite criticizing Heston for his inability to produce a convincing English accent in the film. Jeff Simon of The Buffalo News likened the film to a melodrama rather than a horror film, though he praised cinematographer Jack Cardiff's work as "nothing short of sublime." Gene Siskel and Roger Ebert gave the film negative reviews on their TV show, with Siskel saying it was one of the worst movies of 1980 and Ebert simply saying with an amused laugh "This movie is ridiculous," awarding it a one-star rating out of four.

TV Guide awarded the film 1/4 stars, commending the film's set design, cinematography, and soundtrack. However they criticized the film as being "predictable, unrelentingly dull, and padded with tedious Egyptian travelog footage".

==== Retrospective ====
On the review aggregator website Rotten Tomatoes, 0% of 6 critics' reviews are positive.

In their book The Mummy in Fact, Fiction and Film, writers Susan D. Cowie and Tom Johnson describe The Awakening as a "highly expensive attempt to bring Bram Stoker's The Jewel of Seven Stars, failed alarmingly despite a competent cast, good technical staff, and normally workmanlike writers," with particular criticism for Zimbalist and Heston's performances.

The Terror Trap gave the film 2.5 out of 4 stars, writing, "Subtle and slow paced, this might not appeal to all tastes, but is certainly worth a watch, particularly to see sci fi hero Heston in an uncharacteristically subdued terror performance."

== Sources ==
- Cowie, Susan D.; Johnson, Tom (2007). The Mummy in Fact, Fiction and Film. Jefferson, North Carolina: McFarland & Company. ISBN 978-0-786-43114-4.
- Muir, John Kenneth (2010). Horror Films of the 1980s. Jefferson, North Carolina: McFarland & Company. ISBN 978-0-786-45501-0.
- Pykett, Derek (2014). British Horror Film Locations. Jefferson, North Carolina: McFarland & Company. ISBN 978-0-786-45193-7.
- Senn, Bryan (2024). Mummy Movies: A Comprehensive Guide. Jefferson, North Carolina: McFarland & Company. ISBN 978-1-476-68788-9.
- Stevens, Brad (2010). Monte Hellman: His Life and Films. Jefferson, North Carolina: McFarland & Company. ISBN 978-0-7-864-8188-0.
