= Robert H. Solo =

American film producer (1932–2018)

Robert H. Solo (December 4, 1932 – August 27, 2018) was an American film producer. He was the producer of such films as Invasion of the Body Snatchers (1978), Bad Boys (1983), Colors (1988), Body Snatchers (1993) and Blue Sky (1994).

== Biography ==
Solo was born in Waterbury, Connecticut. He worked as an agent at Ashley-Famous Agency then in 1964 became executive assistant to Owen McLean, head of talent at 20th Century Fox. He turned producer for Scrooge (1970) and The Devils (1971).

In 1971, Solo became Vice-President for Warner Bros. European production, based on London. In 1974, he was appointed executive vice president in charge of world wide production.

In the late 1970s, he returned to independent producing.

== Personal life ==
He was married to Frances Solo and they had a son, Matt, and a daughter, Robin. Robert Solo died on August 27, 2018, at the age of 84.

== Filmography ==
He was a producer in all films unless otherwise noted.

=== Film ===
Year	Film	Credit	Notes
1970	Scrooge		
1971	The Devils		
1978	Invasion of the Body Snatchers		
1980	The Awakening		
1982	I, the Jury		
1983	Bad Boys		
1988	Above the Law	Executive producer	
1988	Colors		
1989	Winter People		
1993	Body Snatchers		
1994	Car 54, Where Are You?		
1994	Blue Sky		Final film as a producer
