= Clewes =

Clewes is a surname. Notable people with the surname:

- Howard Clewes (1912–1988), British screenwriter and novelist
- Peter Clewes, Canadian architect

== See also ==
- Clews (disambiguation)
- Lewes (surname)
