= The Invasion (film) =

2007 American film by Oliver Hirschbiegel

- Theatrical release poster
- Directed by: Oliver Hirschbiegel
- Screenplay by: David Kajganich
- Based on: The Body Snatchers; 1954 stories in Collier's by Jack Finney
- Produced by: Joel Silver
- Starring: Nicole Kidman; Daniel Craig; Jeremy Northam; Jeffrey Wright
- Cinematography: Rainer Klausmann
- Edited by: Joel Negron; Hans Funck
- Music by: John Ottman
- Production companies: Village Roadshow Pictures; Silver Pictures; Vertigo Entertainment
- Distributed by: Warner Bros. Pictures
- Release date: August 17, 2007
- Running time: 99 minutes
- Country: United States
- Languages: English; Russian
- Budget: $65–80 million
- Box office: $40.2 million

The Invasion is a 2007 American science fiction horror film directed by Oliver Hirschbiegel, written by David Kajganich, and starring Nicole Kidman and Daniel Craig. Unhappy with the original cut of the film, the studio hired The Wachowskis for additional writing and James McTeigue to re-shoot some scenes. The plot follows a psychiatrist (Kidman) in Washington, D.C. who finds those around her turning into emotionless beings shortly after a Space Shuttle crashes to Earth, bringing with it mysterious alien spores.

Development of the film began in 2004. Warner Bros. Pictures hired David Kajganich to write what was intended to be a relatively straightforward remake of the 1956 film Invasion of the Body Snatchers, but Kajganich amended the story to reflect contemporary times. Principal photography began in September 2005. Released on August 17, 2007, the film was a commercial failure and received primarily negative reviews from critics.

The Invasion is the fourth film adaptation of the 1955 novel The Body Snatchers by Jack Finney following Don Siegel's 1956 film Invasion of the Body Snatchers, Philip Kaufman's 1978 remake of the same name, and Abel Ferrara's 1993 film Body Snatchers.

== Plot ==
After a Space Shuttle crashes on Earth, an intelligent fungus-like organism is discovered on wreckage scattered across the United States. Soon afterward, people begin behaving strangely, showing detachment and a loss of emotion. Among the first affected is Tucker Kaufman, a CDC official investigating the crash. His ex-wife, psychiatrist Carol Bennell, notices that patients and friends insist that their loved ones are "not themselves," while her young son Oliver observes similar unusual behavior in his peers.

On Halloween, Oliver finds a disturbing patch of skin on a trick-or-treater, initially thought to be makeup, which Carol connects to reports of a mysterious flu. She takes the sample to her friend Dr. Ben Driscoll for analysis. Carol and Oliver then witness a car accident in which a troubled woman is run over. When Carol approaches to give a witness statement, an emotionless police officer dismisses her and records only her license plate. Later, Carol and Ben attend dinner with Czech diplomat Belicec, his wife Luddie, and Russian diplomat Yorish. Carol is also attacked at home by a stranger posing as a census worker, intensifying her fear of a widespread threat.

Ben and his colleague Dr. Stephen Galeano determine that the organism takes control of people during REM sleep. They also find that some individuals are immune, including those who have suffered from brain-affecting illnesses such as encephalitis or ADEM. Oliver is immune due to an episode of ADEM he experienced as a child, making him potentially vital to finding a cure. Carol joins Ben at the Belicecs’ home to investigate further and witnesses transformations in Yorish and a friend of the Belicecs.

Carol goes to Tucker's house, where he and several colleagues confront her, claiming that the altered humans represent a better world. When she refuses to join them, Tucker infects her by spitting into her face. Carol escapes and reunites with Ben and Oliver. Ben is later converted by the organism and tries to persuade Carol to accept the infection, but she shoots him in the leg and flees with Oliver.

Galeano and his team travel to Fort Detrick in Maryland to develop a cure using Oliver's immunity. Carol and Oliver remain protected while scientists create a vaccine, eventually eradicating the epidemic. Those who were changed regain their emotions while having no memory of their past actions. Carol and Ben are reunited, and Oliver remains safe, as the immediate threat of the organism is eliminated.

== Cast ==
- Nicole Kidman as Dr. Carol Bennell
- Daniel Craig as Dr. Ben Driscoll
- Jeremy Northam as Tucker Kaufman
- Jackson Bond as Oliver
- Jeffrey Wright as Dr. Stephen Galeano
- Veronica Cartwright as Wendy Lenk
- Josef Sommer as Dr. Henryk Belicec
- Celia Weston as Ludmilla Belicec
- Roger Rees as Yorish Kagonavich
- Eric Benjamin as Gene
- Susan Floyd as Pam
- Stephanie Berry as Carly
- Alexis Raben as Jill
- Adam LeFevre as Richard Lenk
- Joanna Merlin as Joan Kaufman
- Malin Åkerman as Autumn (uncredited)
- Jeff Wincott as Transit Cop

== Production ==
=== Development ===
In March 2004, Warner Bros. Pictures hired David Kajganich to write a script that would serve as a remake of the 1956 science fiction film Invasion of the Body Snatchers. In July 2005, Oliver Hirschbiegel was attached to direct, with production to begin in Edgemere, Maryland. The following August, Nicole Kidman was cast to star in the film, then titled Invasion, receiving a salary of close to $17 million. Invasion was based on the script by Kajganich, originally intended as a remake of Invasion of the Body Snatchers, but Kajganich crafted a different enough story for the studio to see the project as an original conception. Despite this, the end credits of the film still state "Based on the novel The Body Snatchers by Jack Finney". Kajganich described the story to reflect contemporary times, saying, "You just have to look around our world today to see that power inspires nothing more than the desire to retain it and to eliminate anything that threatens it." The screenwriter said that the story was set in Washington, D.C. to reflect the theme. In August, Daniel Craig was cast opposite Kidman in the lead. The film, whose original title Invasion of the Body Snatchers was shortened to Invasion due to Kajganich's different concept, was changed once more to The Visiting so it would not be confused with ABC's TV series Invasion. In October 2006, the title was changed from The Visiting to The Invasion, due to the cancellation of the ABC TV series.

=== Filming ===
Filming began on September 26, 2005, in Baltimore and lasted 45 days. Filming also took place in Washington, D.C., including in the Cleveland Park Metro station, outside the Foggy Bottom–GWU Metro station, and in Dupont Circle. The film had minimal visual effects, with no need for greenscreen work. Instead, the director shot from odd camera angles and claustrophobic spaces to increase tension in the film.

==== Re-shoots ====
Warner Bros. was unhappy with Hirschbiegel's results and hired The Wachowskis to rewrite the film and assist with additional shooting. The studio later hired director James McTeigue to perform re-shoots that would cost $10 million, for which McTeigue would not be credited. After 13 months of inactivity, re-shoots took place in January 2007 to increase action scenes and add a twist ending. The re-shoot lasted for 17 days in Los Angeles. During the re-shooting, Kidman was involved in an accident while in a Jaguar that was being towed by a stunt driver, and was taken to a hospital briefly. Kidman broke several ribs, but she was able to get back to work soon after being hospitalized.

=== Musical score ===
In May 2007, composer John Ottman recorded the musical score for The Invasion, using heavy synthesizers combined with a 77-piece orchestra intended to create "otherworldly foreboding and tension". The music was also designed to have an avant-garde postmodern style, with atmospheric and thrilling action elements.

== Promotion ==
The music in the trailer is called "Untitled 8 (a.k.a. "Popplagið")" by Sigur Rós.

== Release ==
The Invasion was originally intended to be released in June 2006, but it was postponed to 2007. The film was released on August 17, 2007, in the United States and Canada, in 2,776 theaters.

=== Home media ===
Warner Bros. Home Entertainment released The Invasion on DVD and Blu-ray on January 29, 2008. On November 12, 2024, Arrow Video released the film in newly restored Blu-ray and 4K UHD Blu-ray editions, licensed by Warner Bros. in both the United States and United Kingdom.

== Reception ==
=== Box office ===
The Invasion grossed $15.1 million domestically (United States and Canada) and $25.1 million in other territories, for a worldwide total of $40.2 million, against a production budget of $65–$80 million. It opened at No. 5, spending its first two weeks in the Top 10 at the domestic box office.

=== Critical response ===
On the review aggregator website Rotten Tomatoes, 20% of 163 critics' reviews are positive, with an average rating of 4.3/10. The website's consensus reads: "The Invasion is slickly made, but it lacks psychological insight and thrills." Metacritic, which uses a weighted average, assigned the film a score of 45 out of 100, based on 31 critics, indicating "mixed or average" reviews. Audiences polled by CinemaScore gave it C grade.

Roger Ebert of the Chicago Sun-Times called it "the fourth, and the least, of the movies made from Jack Finney's classic science fiction novel." Owen Gleiberman of Entertainment Weekly wrote that it was "a soulless rehash...The movie isn't terrible; it's just low-rent and reductive." Joanne Kaufman of The Wall Street Journal added, "With all the shoot-outs, the screaming, the chases, collisions and fireballs, there isn't much time for storytelling."

Manohla Dargis of The New York Times criticized the film, writing: "The latest and lamest version of Invasion of the Body Snatchers might have been an accidental camp classic if its politics weren't so abhorrent and the movie didn't try to hide its ineptitude behind a veil of pomposity." Paul Arendt of the BBC wrote: "Having established an effectively creepy mood in the first half, the film eventually degenerates into a muddled mess, with Nicole and Daniel Craig dodging zombies while popping amphetamines in a desperate effort to stay awake. We know how they feel." Maitland McDonagh of TV Guide called the film "a frantic mess that opens with a scene plucked from the film's third act that smacks of having been moved up to pacify audiences too restless for a slow build."
