= Four Word Film Review =

Online database of film summaries

The Four Word Film Review (FWFR) is an interactive website founded in 1999 by Benj Clews. It is an online database of film summaries, all written in four words or fewer and submitted by site members. The database currently contains more than 275,000 reviews covering some 25,000 films.

The Four Word Film Review was nominated in 2005 for a Webby Award in the Humor category.

== Reviews ==
Users of the site, or "FWFRers" (sometimes pronounced "fwiffers"), write the reviews and submit them for site publication. Submitted reviews are put on the FWFRer’s Pending Approval list. Clews and a team of anonymous volunteer editors (called "MERPs", an acronym for the site's Multiple Editor Review Processing system) to weed out submissions according to broadly defined selection guidelines. If the review passes the Pending Approval process, it is added to the site and other FWFRers have the opportunity to vote on it.

Exactly what constitutes an “acceptable” Four Word Film Review is often a source of heated debate on the site’s message board. The general rules are listed in the site's FAQ, although their interpretation is ever evolving, subject to both the decisions of the site’s creator/owner, and the interpretation of the MERPs.

One common reason for the editors to decline a submitted review is that it is "too generic," meaning it doesn’t make specific enough reference to the film in question and may include fanboy statements. According to the site's FAQ, other reasons a review may be declined include exceeding the four-word limit, using a quotation from the film itself rather than written in the voice of the site user, similarity to one that is already posted, or being incomprehensible to MERPs. The reviewer is entitled to one appeal for a declined review, in which the user may explain the review and reasons why it should be accepted. Appeals are limited to 100 characters or fewer. All submissions and declines are ultimately at Clews' discretion except for the rule that all reviews must be four words or fewer.

Every page of the website features a “What Film?” box, which randomly selects one of the many thousands of reviews. The "What Film?" box allows the visitor to guess which film to which it refers, then follow a link to the film to see if he or she was correct. The box reflects the site's philosophy that it must be possible to deduce a film from its review.

== Examples of reviews ==
- "Martin spins Sellers' grave." (for The Pink Panther; review written by Randall)
- "Waterworld, starring Al Gore." (for An Inconvenient Truth; review written by The Prof)
- "Julia gets in Gere." (for Pretty Woman; review written by george fourman)
- "Princess suffers sleeping curse." (for Sleeping Beauty; review written by MelissaS)
- "Virtual viral villain vanquished." (for The Matrix Revolutions; review written by SoS)
- "Indiana Jones' Temple, Doom." (for Jonestown: The Life and Death of Peoples Temple; review written by wildheartlivie)
- "Depp: Shear genius." (for Edward Scissorhands; review written by Ali)
- "Wee Will Rock You (for School of Rock; review written by Pope George Ringo)
- "Beatle on wall doco." (for Let It Be; review written by AussieCanuck)
- "Not-so-White Sox." (for Eight Men Out; review written by Badbart)
- "Harry gets Goyle-ish figure." (for Harry Potter and the Chamber of Secrets; review written by Montgomery)
- "D.C. M.D. vs E.T's." (for The Invasion; review written by calmer)
- "Take one Russian trip." (for Russian Ark; review written by Haggis)
- "Matt in, Leo out." (for The Departed; review by Gregorik)
- "John Fitzgerald: troublesome, self-obsessed." (for JFK; review written by Salopian)
- "Robot goes nuts, bolts." (for I, Robot; review written by Airbolt)
- "Fenella fielding monster's ball." (for Carry On Screaming; review written by Woland)

== Quality reviews and voting ==
Members of FWFR are encouraged to vote for reviews that they particularly like or find humorous, the objective being to encourage contributors to write humorous, clever, or otherwise entertaining reviews. Over the years, a core group of users has developed, and this has led to many of the reviews incorporating inside jokes. Perhaps the most famous is the “Icy Dead People” review for the film Titanic. This review, referring to those who froze to death in the Atlantic following the sinking of the RMS Titanic, is an example of a “pop culture reference” review, as it is a pun on a famous quote from another film (The Sixth Sense). It quickly became one of the top vote-getters, and has spawned imitators throughout the site, all based on the same film quote. Reviews are also judged by how completely they summarize the film. Each FWFRer is allowed to vote on a given review only once.

The twenty reviews that receive the most votes each day are displayed in the "Top Reviews" section of the site. The Top Reviews section changes frequently to reflect votes cast during the preceding 24 hours.

=== All-time top reviews ===
The site's "All-time Top Reviews" pages display the five hundred reviews with the most votes. Currently, long-time reviewer MguyX's review of Kramer vs. Kramer is the all-time highest vote getter ("I bet Kramer wins."), which only barely displaced the relatively less prolific pudking's review for Titanic ("Icy dead people.") at the number one spot. Other former number ones include Aardball's review of The Blair Witch Project ("Tense. Intense. In tents.") and noncentz's review of Breast Men ("Sale of two titties.").

== Accolades ==
FWFRers may collate movies with a common feature into groups, referred to on the site as "accolades". They are called "accolades" because a trophy, assigned to the accolade by its creator, is awarded to the reviewer once a review is written for every movie in the group. Any number of accolades may be created, and no guidelines have been set for their creation. However, accolades are expected to have some kind of purpose or theme, an accolade may contain, for example; all the films in a series or a franchise (the Star Wars films, The Terminator series, et al.), all the films featuring a certain actor or made by a particular director, films featuring a day of the week in the title, or films with a post-Apocalyptic theme etc. An accolade can include any number of movies.

Each FWFRer's personal page includes a "trophy cabinet," showing every accolade they have completed. To date, Randall, the most prolific completer of accolades, has more than 1800 in his trophy cabinet.

There is no central or group review of accolades. The creation and maintenance of accolades is on an individual basis.

== Four Word Film Reviews: The Book ==
After several years of expressed interest from founder Benj Clews to develop the website's content into book form, in 2008 site user Michael Onesi spearheaded a concerted pitch effort to assess publishers' interest. Within two weeks, interest was registered from several publishing agents, and ultimately Adams Media won the right to publish the book. Made up of reviews originally published on the website, the book was released on August 18, 2010. In mid-2010, a second website was established to promote the book.

== The Fourum ==
FWFR has a message board, called the Fourum, for discussion of any topic. The Fourum has several categories.

=== FWFR Related ===
"FWFR related" is a broad category in the Fourum. The sections include:

- "Reviews" - Discussions of any and everything FWFR related. Contains review discussion and a number of individually run contests.
- "Film Related" - Discussions of accolades, rankings, ratings, and features of the site. It contains a section devoted to listing and describing accolades created by members.
- "Site Maintenance" - Discussions related to reviews that may be generic, misspelled, duplicates or incorrect descriptions of the film.
- "General" - Discussions of FWFR that doesn't fall into the above categories.

=== Film Related ===
"Film Related" contains discussions of all things regarding film:

- "Films" - Members discuss current films, old films and films yet to come.
- "Film Queries" - Members may post questions regarding film identification, cast members and actors.
- "General" - Members may discuss anything else film related.

=== Games and contests ===
"Games and contests" is a busy section within the Fourum. The traditional games include:

- "Alternative Four Word Reviews" - four word reviews for things other than films.
- "Avatar Contests" - a contest to come up with the funniest or most clever message board avatar that complies with the week's given theme. The winner of each contest gets to choose the theme of the next.
- "Four Word Tasteless Obituaries (FWTOs)" - four word obituaries describing the life of someone (living or dead) as though they had just died.
- "Four World Porn Titles (FWPTs)" - four word titles describing the names of films that would have been made should the subject have chosen to make pornographic films.
- "Movie Haikus" - reviews in haiku format.

=== Off-Topic ===
"Off-Topic" contains discussions related to everything else outside of films.

== See also ==
- Sticks Nix Hick Pix
