= Veronica Cartwright =

British actress (born 1949)

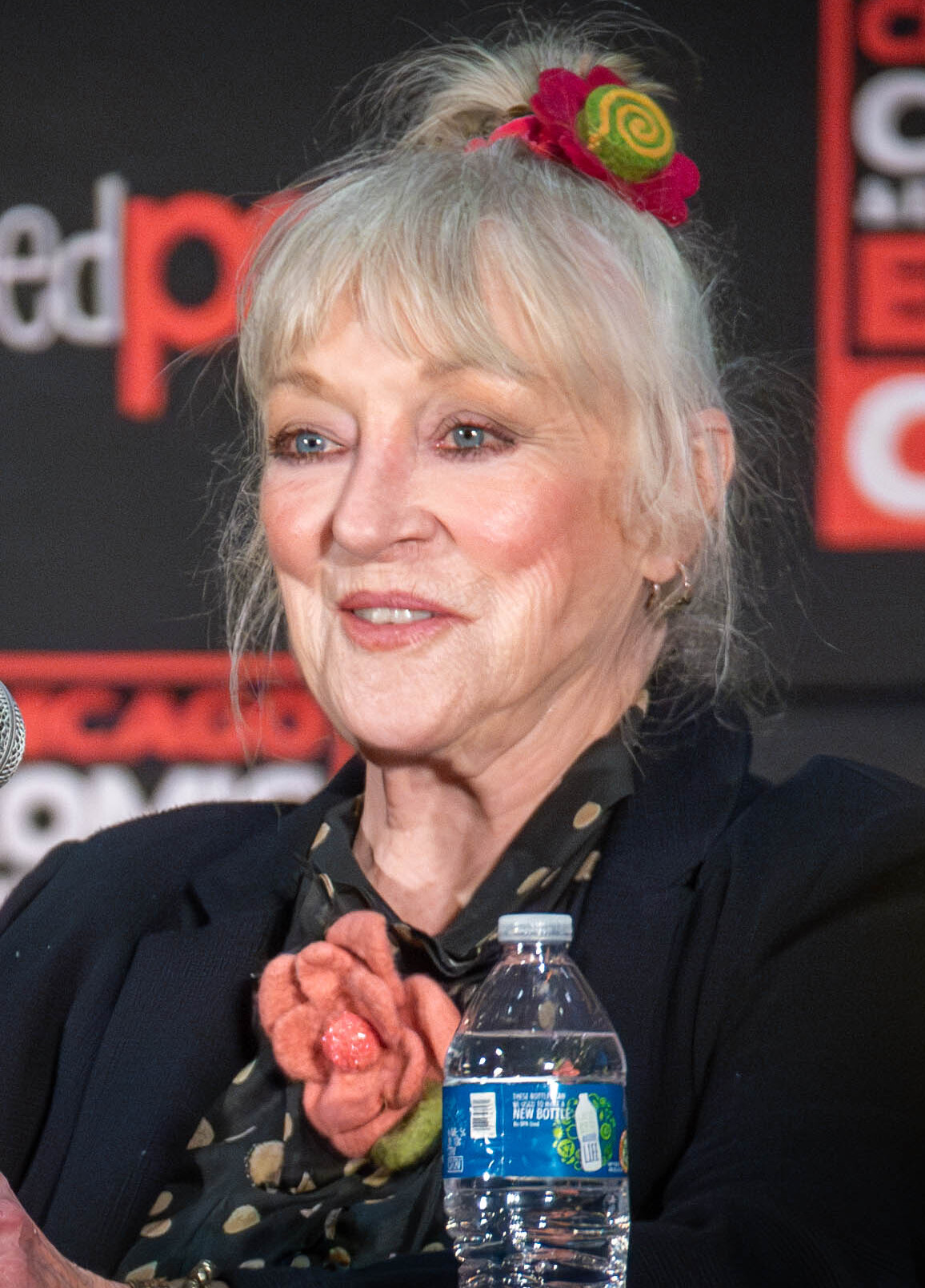
- Cartwright in 2024
- Born: 20 April 1949 (age 77); Bristol, England
- Occupation: Actress
- Years active: 1958–present
- Spouses: Richard Gates (divorced) Stanley Goldstein (divorced) Richard Compton (died 2007)
- Relatives: Angela Cartwright (sister)

Veronica Cartwright (born 20 April 1949) is an English actress based in Los Angeles, California. She appeared in science fiction and horror films, and has three Primetime Emmy Award nominations. Her younger sister is actress Angela Cartwright.

As a child actress, Cartwright appeared in supporting roles in The Children's Hour and The Birds, the latter of which was her first commercial success. She made her transition into mainstream, mature roles with 1978's Invasion of the Body Snatchers. She played Lambert in the science-fiction horror film Alien, which earned her recognition and a Saturn Award for Best Supporting Actress, and additionally appeared in the films The Right Stuff and The Witches of Eastwick which earned her praise. In the 1990s, she received three nominations for the Primetime Emmy Award for Outstanding Guest Actress in a Drama Series, one of which was for her role on ER and two of which were for her role in The X-Files.

== Early life ==
Veronica Cartwright was born on 20 April 1949 in Bristol, England. When she was a young child, she emigrated to the United States with her parents and younger sister, Angela, settling in Los Angeles, California. Cartwright is a Catholic and has attended Mass at St. Charles Borromeo with her sister Angela.

== Career ==
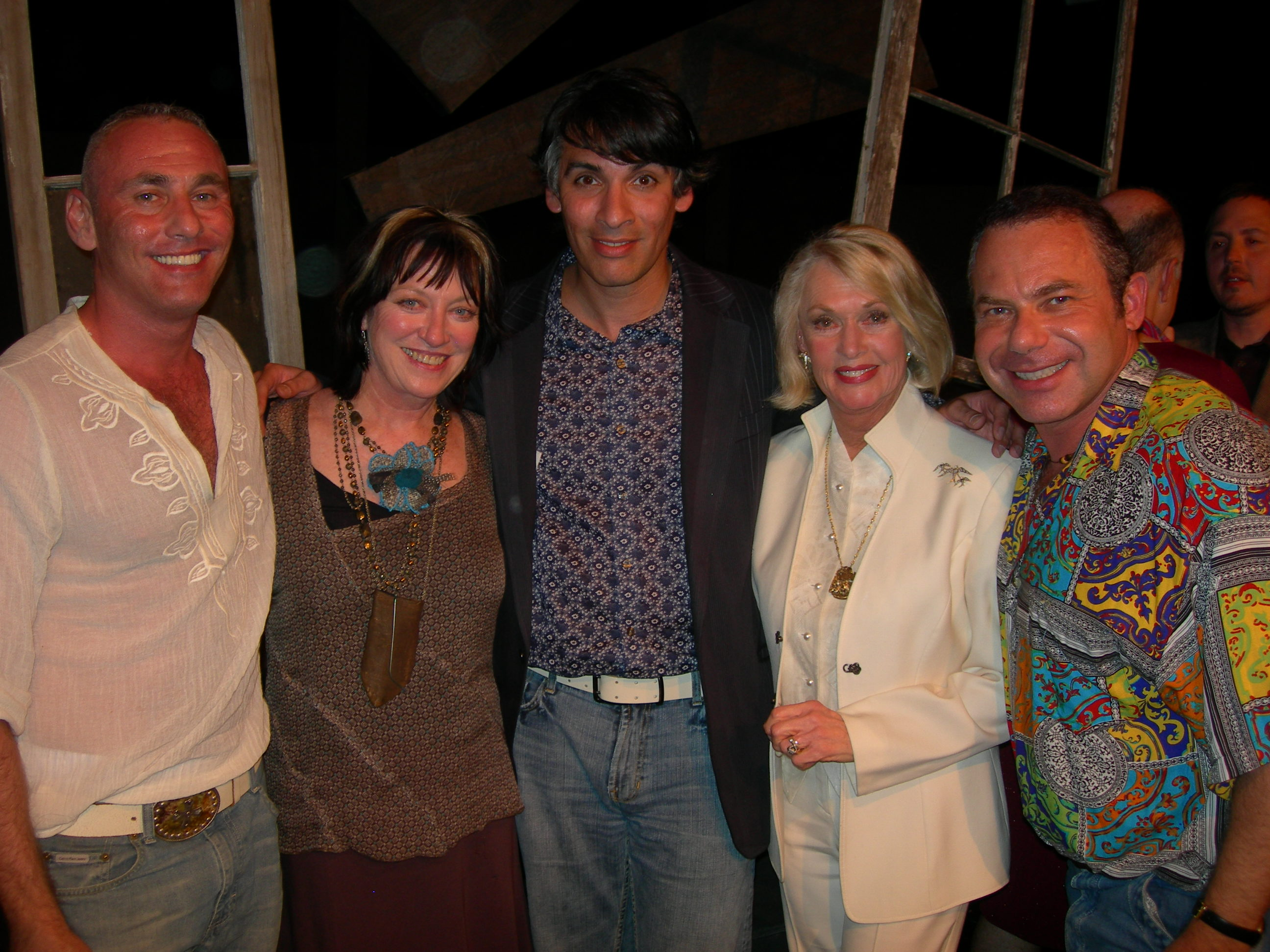
Cartwright (second from left) with the cast of The Birds (1963) in 2006

In 1958, her career as a child actress began with a role in In Love and War. Among her early appearances were repeated roles in the television series Leave It to Beaver (as Beaver's classmates Violet Rutherford and, later, Peggy MacIntosh) and episodes of One Step Beyond ("The Haunting") and The Twilight Zone ("I Sing the Body Electric"). In 1963, she guest starred twice in NBC's medical drama about psychiatry, The Eleventh Hour, in the episodes "The Silence of Good Men" and "My Name is Judith, I'm Lost, You See".

Cartwright appeared in the films The Children's Hour (1961) and Alfred Hitchcock's The Birds (1963), which were both highly successful. In The Birds, she was cast along with her television father from Leave It to Beaver, Richard Deacon, although the two were not on screen together. She appeared in Spencer's Mountain (1963) with Henry Fonda and Kym Karath. She played daughter Jemima Boone in the first two seasons of NBC's Daniel Boone from 1964 until 1966, with co-stars Fess Parker, Patricia Blair, Darby Hinton, Ed Ames and Dallas McKennon. She won a regional Emmy Award for the television movie Tell Me Not in Mournful Numbers (1964). She achieved adult success with film roles in Inserts (1974), Goin' South (1978) and Invasion of the Body Snatchers (1978).

Cartwright's breakout feature was the science-fiction horror film Alien (1979), for which she was originally cast as Alien's heroine Ellen Ripley, but director Ridley Scott instead set her to play Lambert prior to shooting. The infamous chestburster scene in the film featured a genuine reaction from Cartwright, who had not been informed beforehand that blood would be involved; co-star Tom Skerritt confirmed this by saying, "What you saw on camera was the real response. She had no idea what the hell happened. All of a sudden this thing just came up." She won the Saturn Award for Best Supporting Actress for her performance.

Her subsequent film roles include The Right Stuff (1983), Flight of the Navigator (1986), The Witches of Eastwick (1987), Money Talks (1997), Scary Movie 2 (2001), Kinsey (2004) and Straight-Jacket (2004). She was nominated again for the Saturn Award for Best Supporting Actress for The Witches of Eastwick.

A frequent performer in television, she has played guest roles in Route 66, Leave It to Beaver, The Mod Squad, Miami Vice, Baywatch, L.A. Law, ER, The X-Files, Chicago Hope, Will & Grace, Touched by an Angel, Judging Amy, Six Feet Under, The Closer, and Law & Order: Special Victims Unit. Cartwright has received three Emmy Award nominations, one for her work in ER in 1997, and two for her work on The X-Files in 1998 and 1999. Cartwright also starred as Mrs. Olive Osmond in the made-for-TV film Inside the Osmonds.

She co-starred in the fourth version of Invasion of the Body Snatchers, The Invasion (2007). She appears on the cover art for the Scissor Sisters' 2006 single "I Don't Feel Like Dancin'" and on their second album Ta-Dah. In 2014, Cartwright reprised her role as Joan Lambert for DLC episodes in Alien: Isolation based on the original film, and appeared in the remake of The Town That Dreaded Sundown. She played the role of Sibley Gamble, a psychic on General Hospital, between 8 July 2019, and 16 July 2019.

Cartwright's theatre credits include Electra, Talley's Folly, The Bat and The Master Builder, for which she received brilliant reviews. Her performances in The Hands of its Enemy, The Triplet Collection and Homesteaders brought her Drama-Logue Awards for Best Actress.

== Filmography ==
=== Film ===
Year	Title	Role	Notes
1958	In Love and War	Allie O'Neill	Uncredited
1961	The Children's Hour	Rosalie Wells	
1963	The Birds	Cathy Brenner	
1963	Spencer's Mountain	Becky Spencer	Uncredited
1964	One Man's Way	Mary	
1975	Inserts	Harlene	
1978	Goin' South	Hermine	
1978	Invasion of the Body Snatchers	Nancy Bellicec	
1978	The Kid from Not-So-Big	Corinne	
1979	Alien	Joan Lambert	
1983	Nightmares	Claire Houston	Segment: "Night of the Rat"
1983	The Right Stuff	Betty Grissom	
1985	My Man Adam	Elaine Swit	
1986	Flight of the Navigator	Helen Freeman	
1987	Wisdom	Samantha Wisdom	
1987	The Witches of Eastwick	Felicia Alden	
1989	Valentino Returns	Patricia "Pat" Gibbs	
1990	False Identity	Vera Errickson	
1991	Walking the Dog	Unknown	Short film
1992	Man Trouble	Helen Dextra	
1994	Mirror, Mirror 2: Raven Dance	Sister Aja	
1994	On Hope	Woman In Grocery	Short film
1994	Two Over Easy	Molly	Short film
1995	Candyman: Farewell to the Flesh	Octavia Tarrant	
1996	Shoot the Moon	Mrs. Thomas	
1997	Money Talks	Connie Cipriani	
1997	Sparkler	Dottie Delgato	
1998	My Engagement Party	Sarah Salsburg	
1999	A Slipping-Down Life	Mrs. Casey	
1999	Trash	Principal Evans	
2001	In the Bedroom	Minister	
2001	Critic's Choice	Watkins	Short film
2001	Scary Movie 2	Mrs. Voorhees	
2002	Mackenheim	Eleanor	Short film
2003	Just Married	Mrs. "Pussy" McNerney	Uncredited
2004	Twisted	Landlady	Uncredited
2004	Straight-Jacket	Jerry Albrecht	
2004	Kinsey	Sara Kinsey	
2005	Barry Dingle	Eleanor Dingle	
2007	Mommy's House	Mommy	Short film
2007	The Invasion	Wendy Lenk	
2009	Call of the Wild	Sheriff Taylor	
2010	Neowolf	Mrs. Belakov	
2011	InSight	Patricia	
2011	Montana Amazon	Margaret	
2012	The Yellow Wallpaper	Catherine Sayer	
2013	The Odd Way Home	Francine	
2014	The Town That Dreaded Sundown	Lillian Lerner	
2015	The Dark Below	Tess	
2019	Limbo	Louise	
2019	The Field	Edith	
2020	Breaking Fast	Judy	
2022	The Phantoms	Miss Sayer	
2024	The Ruse	Olivia Stone	
2025	A Kill for a Kill	Janice	

=== Television ===
Year	Title	Role	Notes
1959	Zane Grey Theater	Sarah Butler	Episode: "The Lone Woman"
1959–1961	Make Room for Daddy	Girl in Play / Veronica	2 episodes
1959–1963	Leave It to Beaver	Violet Rutherford / Peggy MacIntosh	4 episodes
1960	Alcoa Presents One Step Beyond	Gillian	Episode: "The Haunting"
1960	The Betty Hutton Show	Fake Foster Child	Uncredited, Episode: "Gullible Goldie"
1960–1961	Alfred Hitchcock Presents	Viola Wellington / Judy Davidson / Lettie / Lauretta Bishop	2 episodes
1962	Route 66	Miriam - age 9	Episode: "Love Is a Skinny Kid"
1962	The Twilight Zone	Anne Rogers - age 11	Episode: "I Sing the Body Electric"
1963	The Dick Powell Theatre	Unknown	Episode: "The Third Side of a Coin"
1963	The Eleventh Hour	Judith Cameron / Jan Ellendale	2 episodes
1964	Tell Me Not in Mournful Numbers	Unknown	Television film
1964–1966	Daniel Boone	Jemima Boone	37 episodes
1965	Dr. Kildare	Nancy Hiller	Episode: "Take Care of My Little Girl"
1965	Who Has Seen the Wind?	Kiri Radek	Television
Mannix	Mrs. Goldberg	Uncredited, Episode: "Edge of the Knife"	
The Name of the Game	Nancy Robins	Episode: "High on a Rainbow"	
1969	Family Affair	Jo-Ann	Episode: "Flower Power"
1969	Dragnet 1970	Melissa Stevens	Episode: "Personnel: The Shooting"
1969	Mod Squad	Gail Whitney	Episode: "The Girl in Chair Nine"
1970	Death Valley Days	Carrie Dalton	Episode: "Simple Question of Justice"
1970	The Bold Ones: The Lawyers	Mary	Episode: "Point of Honor"
1970	Then Came Bronson	Petey Traine	Episode: "Still Waters"
1970	My Three Sons	Ruth Fletcher	Episode: "The Honeymoon"
1973	Here We Go Again	Nancy	Episode: "Sunday, Soggy Sunday"
1976	Bernice Bobs Her Hair	Marjorie	Television film
1976	Serpico	Lucy	Episode: "Dawn of the Furies"
1980	Guyana Tragedy: The Story of Jim Jones	Marceline "Marcy" Jones	Miniseries
1981	The Big Black Pill	Sister Theresa	Television film
1982	Prime Suspect	Janice Staplin	Television film
1985	The New Leave It to Beaver	Violet Rutherford	Episode: "Violet Rutherford Returns"
1985	Robert Kennedy & His Times	Ethel Skakel Kennedy	Miniseries
1986	Intimate Encounters	Emily	Television film
1987	Miami Vice	Society Dame	Episode: "By Hooker by Crook"
1988	Tanner '88	Molly Hark	10 episodes
1989	Desperate for Love	Betty Petrie	Television film
1989	Baywatch	Mrs. Harris	Uncredited, Episode: "Panic at Malibu Pier"
1989–1992	L.A. Law	Margaret Flanagan	9 episodes
1990	A Son's Promise	Dorothy Donaldson	Television film
1990	Hitler's Daughter	Patricia Benedict	Television film
1991	CBS Schoolbreak Special	Caroline Morris	Episode: "Abby, My Love"
1991	Dead in the Water	Victoria Haines	Television film
1992	Lincoln and the War Within	Charlotte Cushman	Television film
1993	It's Nothing Personal	Barbara	Television film
1993	Triumph Over Disaster: The Hurricane Andrew Story	Carla Hulin	Television film
1994	Dead Air	The Caller	Television film
1995	My Brother's Keeper	Pat	Television film
1996	American Gothic	Angela	Episode: "Dr. Death Takes a Holiday"
1996	The Lottery	Maggie Dunbar	Television film
1996	Sliders	The Flame	Voice, Episode: "The Fire Within"
1997	ER	Norma Houston	2 episodes
1997	Boston Common	Betty	Episode: "Here's to You, Mrs. Byrnes"
1997	Quicksilver Highway	Myra	Television film
1997–1998	George & Leo	Anna	2 episodes
1998	The Rat Pack	Rocky Cooper	Television film
1998–2018	The X-Files	Cassandra Spender	4 episodes
1999	The Last Man on Planet Earth	Director Elizabeth Riggs	Television film
1999	Chicago Hope	Karen Flanders	Episode: "Team Play"
1999	Will & Grace	Judith McFarland	Episode: "Homo for the Holidays"
2001	Inside the Osmonds	Olive Osmond	Television film
2001	Touched by an Angel	Shirlee Gibbons	Episode: "Famous Last Words"
2002	Family Law	Norma Benson	Episode: "Arlene's Choice"
2002	Judging Amy	Dorothea Mitchell	Episode: "A Pretty Good Day"
2003	Without a Trace	Mrs. Beckworth	Episode: "There Goes the Bride"
2004	Dr. Vegas	Evelyn	Episode: "All In"
2004–2005	Six Feet Under	Peg Kimmel	3 episodes
2005	The Closer	Vera Mathers	Episode: "Good Housekeeping"
2005	Without a Trace	Susan	Episode: "John Michaels"
2005	Law & Order: Special Victims Unit	Virginia Kennison	Episode: "Starved"
2005	Nip/Tuck	Mother Mary Claire	Episode: "Quentin Costa"
2005–2006	Invasion	Valerie Shenkman	5 episodes
2006	Boston Legal	Judge Peggy Zeder	Episode: "Helping Hands"
2006	Cold Case	Mary Ryan	Episode: "Dog Day Afternoons"
2006	CSI: Crime Scene Investigation	Diane Chase	Episode: "Rashomama"
2006	7th Heaven	Ms. Fitzhenry	Episode: "A Pain in the Neck"
2006–2007	The Nine	Barbara Dalton	3 episodes
2007	October Road	Lynn Farmer	Episode: "Deck the Howls"
2008	The Mr. Men Show	Little Miss Elderly / Little Miss Jotünheim / Little Miss Scarlett	Voice
2009–2010	Eastwick	Bun Waverly	11 episodes
2010	Drop Dead Diva	Marian Porter	Episode: "Back from the Dead"
2010	Memphis Beat	Miranda	Episode: "I Shall Not Be Moved"
2010–2012	Kick Buttowski: Suburban Daredevil	Ms. Dominic	Voice, 3 episodes
2012	Revenge	Judge Elizabeth Blackwell	2 episodes
2013	Non-Stop	Rose	Television film
2014	Resurrection	Helen Edgerton	5 episodes
2015	Bosch	Irène Saxon	4 episodes
2016	The Loud House	Sue	Voice, episode: "The Old and the Restless"
2016	Criminal Minds	Flora Martin	Episode: "The Bond"
2017	Mommy, I Didn't Do It	Judge Tannin	Television film
2018	Supernatural	Lily Sunder	Episode: "Byzantium"
2019	Chilling Adventures of Sabrina	Mrs. McGarvey	Episode: "Doctor Cerberus’s House of Horror"
2019	General Hospital	Sibley Gamble	3 episodes
2021	The Good Doctor	Maxine Stanley	Episode: "Dr. Ted"
2021	The Resident	Celeste Crisforth	Episode: "Old Dogs, New Tricks"
2023	The Rookie	Beatrice O'Malley	Episode: "Daddy Cop"
2023	Gotham Knights	Eunice Harmon	2 episodes
2024	A Man on the Inside	Beverley Bankl	5 episodes

=== Video games ===
Year	Title	Role	Notes
2014	Alien: Isolation	Joan Lambert	Voice; Nostromo Edition
2015	Fallout 4	Trashcan Carla, Doc Anderson, Jackie Hudson, Bartender, Settlers, Vault 81 Residents	

== Awards and nominations ==
Year	Award	Category	Work	Result
1980	Saturn Awards	Best Supporting Actress	Alien	Won
1984	Drama-Logue Awards	Outstanding Performance	The Hands of its Enemy	Won
1988	Saturn Awards	Best Supporting Actress	The Witches of Eastwick	Nominated
1997	Primetime Emmy Awards	Outstanding Guest Actress in a Drama Series	ER	Nominated
1998	Primetime Emmy Awards	Outstanding Guest Actress in a Drama Series	The X-Files	Nominated
1999	Primetime Emmy Awards	Outstanding Guest Actress in a Drama Series	The X-Files	Nominated
2003	DVD Exclusive Awards	Best Audio Commentary	Alien	Won
2005	Fort Lauderdale International Film Festival	Best Supporting Actress	Barry Dingle	Won
2005	Glitter Awards	Best Supporting Actress	Straight-Jacket	Won
2005	Online Film & Television Association	Best Ensemble in a Motion Picture or Limited Series	Kinsey	Nominated
