= Invasion of the Body Snatchers (1978 film) =

1978 film by Philip Kaufman

- Theatrical release poster by Bill Gold
- Directed by: Philip Kaufman
- Screenplay by: W. D. Richter
- Based on: The Body Snatchers (1954 novel) by Jack Finney
- Produced by: Robert H. Solo
- Starring: Donald Sutherland; Brooke Adams; Leonard Nimoy; Jeff Goldblum; Veronica Cartwright
- Cinematography: Michael Chapman
- Edited by: Douglas Stewart
- Music by: Denny Zeitlin
- Production company: Solofilm
- Distributed by: United Artists
- Release date: December 22, 1978
- Running time: 115 minutes
- Country: United States
- Language: English
- Budget: $3.5 million
- Box office: $24.9 million (US)

Invasion of the Body Snatchers is a 1978 American science-fiction psychological horror film directed by Philip Kaufman, written by W. D. Richter, and starring Donald Sutherland, Brooke Adams, Veronica Cartwright, Jeff Goldblum, and Leonard Nimoy. It is the second film adaptation of Jack Finney's 1954 novel The Body Snatchers, following the 1956 film.

The plot involves a San Francisco health inspector (Sutherland) and his colleague (Adams) who over the course of a few days discover that humans are being replaced by alien duplicates; each is a perfect biological clone of the person replaced, but devoid of empathy and humanity.

Released in the United States by United Artists on December 22, 1978, Invasion of the Body Snatchers grossed nearly $25 million (equivalent to $123 million in 2025) at the American box office. It initially received varied reviews from critics, though its critical reception has significantly improved in subsequent years, receiving a 93% rating on Rotten Tomatoes and also being hailed as one of the greatest remakes ever, as well as one of the best science fiction horror films of all time.

== Plot ==
An amorphous parasitic alien race abandons its dying planet, eventually coming to Earth. Upon settling, the spores take the form of small pods with fragrant pink flowers.

Elizabeth Driscoll, a laboratory scientist at the San Francisco Health Department, brings one flower home. The next morning her live-in boyfriend, Geoffrey is cold and distant while putting the glass vase that held the flower pod into a garbage truck that is filled with fuzzy, dry material.

Elizabeth confides to her colleague and friend Matthew Bennell that Geoffrey is so changed he must be an impostor. Elizabeth secretly followed him and saw him meeting with strangers. Matthew advises Elizabeth to talk to his psychiatrist friend David Kibner.

En route to Kibner, a hysterical man warns Elizabeth and Matthew of danger as a mob pursues him. They follow the mob and see his dead body surrounded by emotionless onlookers. At Kibner's book promotion event, Matthew finds his friend Jack Bellicec, an aspiring writer, while Elizabeth meets Kibner, who reassures a woman who claims that her husband has changed. Kibner insists the husband's behavior is due to non-commitment. Elizabeth is convinced to return home to Geoffrey.

Jack returns to the mud bath spa he runs with his wife Nancy. The two find a mysterious embryonic adult-body resembling Jack, and call Matthew to investigate. At the disturbing discovery, Matthew goes to warn Elizabeth, and discovers a semi-formed duplicate of her near her bedroom. Matthew rescues Elizabeth and alerts the police and Kibner. When they arrive, Jack and Elizabeth's duplicates have disappeared.

Elizabeth suspects the flowers are involved, but is unable to examine one at the health department offices. In the meantime Matthew tries in vain to alert the authorities. After encountering several doppelgangers, Matthew, Elizabeth, Jack, and Nancy hide out in Matthew's apartment. They call Kibner, who promises to help, but he is a duplicate. As the group fall asleep, large flower pods emerge from the garden and start birthing their replacements. They wake up, and Matthew destroys his own replacement.

The pod people (the fully formed alien replacements) pursue Matthew's group. Jack and Nancy create a distraction, sacrificing themselves, while Matthew and Elizabeth take refuge at the health department. They take speed to remain awake. Jack and Kibner's duplicates ambush and inject them with a sedative, needing them to fall asleep to be replaced. Kibner's duplicate explains the aliens' plan to replace humanity with emotionless duplicates whose only goal is survival. Matthew kills Jack's double and locks Kibner's in a freezer, then escapes with Elizabeth.

Matthew and Elizabeth find Nancy, who tricked the pod people by hiding her emotions. The three blend in among the duplicates. Elizabeth sees a dog-human hybrid – a byproduct of a damaged pod – and screams, alerting the pod people who emit high-pitched screams. In the commotion, Matthew and Elizabeth are separated from Nancy. Boarding a truck delivering plants to Pier 70, they find pods grown and processed in a warehouse.

Noticing a nearby ship, Matthew leaves Elizabeth (whose ankle is sprained) to investigate, only to find it being loaded with pods. Matthew returns to Elizabeth, finding her unresponsive. She disintegrates while her duplicate emerges from the grass. Matthew flees the duplicate, breaks into the dock warehouse, and burns down the building, destroying several plants and killing many pod people. He hides underneath the pier as pursuers search for him. A flashlight shines in his direction.

Later, Matthew resumes work in the health department, acting emotionless among the duplicated employees. While outside, Nancy calls out to him. To her horror, he points at her and emits the duplicates' high-pitched scream.

== Cast ==
- Donald Sutherland as Matthew Bennell
- Brooke Adams as Elizabeth Driscoll
- Jeff Goldblum as Jack Bellicec
- Veronica Cartwright as Nancy Bellicec
- Art Hindle as Geoffrey Howell
- Lelia Goldoni as Katherine Hendley
- Leonard Nimoy as David Kibner
- Tom Luddy as Ted Hendley (uncredited)
- Garry Goodrow as Boccardo (uncredited)
- Maurice Argent as Chef (uncredited)
- Wood Moy as Mr. Tong (uncredited)

Don Siegel and Kevin McCarthy, respectively the director and star of the 1956 film, both make cameo appearances. Siegel plays an assimilated taxi driver, and McCarthy plays a running man shouting "You're next" (a reference to the ending of the original film).

Philip Kaufman's wife Rose Kaufman played Outraged Woman, who argues with Jack at the book party, while Robert Duvall appeared as an uncredited priest on a swing, and Kaufman himself has two uncredited cameos, one as the man who bothers Bennell in a phone booth, and another as the voice of one of the officials whom Bennell contacts.

== Production ==
Considered a "low-budget" Allied Artist film, the movie was made on a budget of $3,500,000. The film was originally being developed by Warner Bros. in 1977, though the project was dropped after the box office failure of Exorcist II: The Heretic where it was then picked by United Artists. Producer Robert H. Solo stated he lobbied for the rights to the book as early as 1976, noting: "It was a long and very hairy process." Principal photography began on February 19, 1978 and closed on April 29, 1978.

Director Philip Kaufman had been a fan of the 1956 film, which he likened to "great radio", although he had not read the novel until after he agreed to direct the film. "I thought, 'Well this doesn't have to be a remake as such. It can be a new envisioning that was a variation on a theme'," he said on the film's 40th anniversary. The first change he anticipated was filming in color; the second was changing the location to San Francisco. "Could it happen in the city I love the most? The city with the most advanced, progressive therapies, politics and so forth? What would happen in a place like that if the pods landed there and that element of 'poddiness' was spread?"

Cinematographer Michael Chapman worked with Kaufman to try to capture the film noir feel of the original in color, reviewing some classics of that genre before production. Some of the elements they borrowed were shots with light giving way to shadow and shooting from evocative angles. They used certain color tinges to indicate that some characters were now pod people. "When they're running along the Embarcadero and the huge shadows appear first, those are sort of classic film noir images", the director said.

Sound editor Ben Burtt, who had helped create many of the signature sounds from Star Wars the year before, also added to the film's ambience. Natural sounds that mix with the city's more industrial noises give way to just the latter as the film progresses. Among them are the grinding noises of garbage trucks, a common urban sound that slowly becomes horrific as it becomes clear that most of what they are processing is the discarded husks that remain of pre-pod human bodies. Burtt also designed the shriek when pod people see a surviving human, a sound Kaufman said was composed of many elements, including a pig's squeal.

Screenwriter W. D. Richter stated that at the start of the film's production, the crew looked for alternative ways to update the design of the pods from the 1956 version. "We don't want them to look like comical giant green pea pods. We're trying to rethink all the graphic horror." All the special effects were created live for the camera. The scene at the beginning where the pods travel through space from their dead homeworld to San Francisco was one of the simplest. "I found some viscous material in an art store, I think we paid $12 for a big vat of it, and then [we dropped it] into solutions and reversed the film", Kaufman recalled. The dog wearing a mask of the banjo player's face included a hole in the mask through which the creature appeared to lick itself.

The film features a number of cameo appearances. Kevin McCarthy, who played Dr. Miles Bennell in the original Invasion of the Body Snatchers, makes a brief appearance as an old man frantically screaming "They're coming!" to passing cars on the street. Though not playing the same character, Kaufman meant McCarthy's cameo as a nod to the original movie, as if he had been "metaphorically" running around the country since the original film shouting out his warnings. While they were filming the scene, in the Tenderloin, Kaufman recalls that a naked man lying on the street awoke and recognized McCarthy. After learning that they were filming the remake of the original Invasion of the Body Snatchers, he told McCarthy that that film was better. "We were in the middle of shooting the film and we got our first review!"

The original film's director, Don Siegel, appears as a taxi driver who alerts the police to Matthew and Elizabeth's attempt to flee the city. Robert Duvall is also seen briefly as a silent priest sitting on a swing set in the opening scene. (Note: In the director's commentary on the DVD release, Kaufman states that Duvall, who had worked with him in The Great Northfield, Minnesota Raid, happened to be in San Francisco at the time of filming and did the scene for free. Kaufman states that Duvall's character is the first "pod person" to be seen in the film. He was reportedly paid with an Eddie Bauer coat.) Kaufman appears in dual roles both as a man wearing a hat who bothers Sutherland's character in a phone booth, and the voice of one of the officials Sutherland's character speaks to on the phone. His wife, Rose Kaufman, has a small role at the book party as the woman who argues with Jeff Goldblum's character. Chapman appears twice as a janitor in the health department.

McCarthy and Siegel played a role in shaping the film's ending. Before filming, Kaufman had sought out Siegel for advice, and while the two were talking in the latter's office, McCarthy happened to come in. The topic eventually came around to the original film's ending, which they regarded as "pat". After coming up with the ending he used, he kept it a secret from everyone involved in the filming except screenwriter W. D. Richter and producer Robert Solo. Sutherland was only informed of the scene the night before shooting; Kaufman is not sure Cartwright even knew until Sutherland turned around to point and shriek at her. The studio executives only learned of it when a cut was screened for them at George Lucas's house.

The film score by Denny Zeitlin was released on United Artists Records; it is the only film score Zeitlin composed. Jerry Garcia of the Grateful Dead recorded the banjo parts.

Kaufman said of the casting of Nimoy, "Leonard had got typecast and this [film] was an attempt to break him out of that", referring to the similar quirks that Dr. Kibner and his pod double had in common with Spock, the Star Trek character that Nimoy was best known for. According to Kaufman, it was Mike Medavoy, then head of production at United Artists, who suggested the casting of Donald Sutherland. Sutherland's character had a similar curly hairstyle as that of another character he portrayed in Don't Look Now (1973). "They would have to set his hair with pink rollers every day", recalled co-star Veronica Cartwright. According to Zeitlin, Sutherland's character was originally written as an "avocational jazz player" early in development.

The director encouraged his actors to fill the spaces between dialogue with facial expressions. "Often people on the set or at the studio are so worried about just getting content, and content is not necessarily going to make the scene full of humanity or feel compassion and amusement and humor", Kaufman told The Hollywood Reporter. He particularly singled out the way Adams rolls her eyes in opposite directions while she and Sutherland have dinner as something that a pod person could not and would never do.

== Release ==
Invasion of the Body Snatchers premiered in the United States on December 22, 1978, showing on 445 screens nationally.

=== Home video ===
Invasion of the Body Snatchers was released on VHS and DVD in the United States, Australia and many European countries. The film was released on Blu-ray Disc in the United States in 2010 by MGM Home Entertainment, then released once more on Blu-ray in 2013 by Arrow Video in the United Kingdom, and Shout! Factory in the United States and Canada in 2016, using a new 2K scan of the interpositive in addition to new and legacy extras. The Shout! release has since been out of print. An Ultra HD Blu-ray was released on November 23, 2021 through Kino Lorber, who also released a remastered Blu-ray on February 1, 2022, followed by Arrow Video in June 2024.

== Reception ==
=== Box office ===
Between its premiere and December 25, the film had earned a total of $1,298,129 in box office sales. It went on to gross a total of nearly $25 million in the United States (equivalent to $123 million in 2025).

On the film's 40th anniversary, Kaufman believes the film may have seemed timely when it came out since the Jonestown mass suicide had occurred a month earlier and still dominated the news: "That was a case of a lot of people from San Francisco were looking for a better world and suddenly found themselves in pod-dom, and it was fatal. It could not have been a more pointed reason for watching the movie."

=== Critical reception ===
==== Contemporaneous ====
The New Yorker's Pauline Kael was a particular fan of the film, writing that it "may be the best film of its kind ever made". Variety wrote that it "validates the entire concept of remakes. This new version of Don Siegel's 1956 cult classic not only matches the original in horrific tone and effect, but exceeds it in both conception and execution." Gene Siskel gave the film three stars out of four and said it was "one of the more entertaining films in what has turned out to be a dismal Christmas movie season". Kevin Thomas of the Los Angeles Times called it "a thoroughly scary success in its own right. Not literally a remake—it's more of a sequel, actually—this handsome, highly imaginative film generates its own implications from Finney's sturdy allegory of dehumanization and manages even to have some fun in the process." On their syndicated TV show Siskel & Ebert gave the film a guarded "two thumbs up". Siskel felt the film was often derivative yet an effective thriller, and Ebert agreed saying it was well-made with good performance but failed to live up to the original.

The film was not without negative criticism. The New York Times's Janet Maslin wrote that the "creepiness [Kaufman] generates is so crazily ubiquitous it becomes funny." Roger Ebert wrote that it "was said to have something to do with Watergate and keeping tabs on those who are not like you", and called Kael's effusive praise for the film "inexplicable". while Time magazine's Richard Schickel labeled its screenplay "laughably literal". Phil Hardy's Aurum Film Encyclopedia called Kaufman's direction "less sure" than the screenplay.

The film received a nomination from the Writers Guild of America for Best Drama Adapted from Another Medium. The film was also nominated for the Hugo Award for Best Dramatic Presentation. It was also recognized by the Academy of Science Fiction, Fantasy and Horror Films. Philip Kaufman won Best Director, and the film was nominated Best Science Fiction Film. Donald Sutherland, Brooke Adams, and Leonard Nimoy received additional nominations for their performances.

==== Subsequent assessment ====
Invasion of the Body Snatchers (1978) has been named among the greatest film remakes ever made, by several publications, including Rolling Stone.

Film scholar M. Keith Booker posited that the film's "paranoid atmosphere" links it to other films outside the science fiction genre, and that it "bears a clear family resemblance to paranoid conspiracy thrillers like Alan J. Pakula's The Parallax View (1974)". Chris Barsanti, in The Sci-Fi Movie Guide (2014), praised the performances of Adams and Sutherland, but criticized some elements of the film, writing: "The subtlety of Donald Siegel's original gives way to gaudy f/x and self-consciously artsy camerawork ... the film is overindulgently long, too, though it certainly has its shocking moments."

On the review aggregator site Rotten Tomatoes, the film has received an approval rating of 93% based on 78 reviews. The site's consensus reads, "Employing gritty camerawork and evocative sound effects, Invasion of the Body Snatchers is a powerful remake that expands upon themes and ideas only lightly explored in the original." On Metacritic, the film has a weighted average score of 75 out of 100 based on 15 critics, indicating "generally favorable" reviews.

In a 2018 review published by Complex, the film was ranked among the greatest science fiction films of all time: "Invasion of the Body Snatchers is doubly impressive; it both improves upon the '56 film and Jack Finney's literary source material with a scarier disposition and more layered character development."

The Chicago Film Critics Association named it the 59th-scariest film ever made.

==== Analysis ====
The German scholar Christian Knöppler wrote that the film was in many ways a lamentation for the end of the counterculture of the 1960s that was especially associated with San Francisco. Philip Kaufman has described the 1960s as a brief moment of time when Americans "woke up from the conforming, other-directed life" that he views as characteristic of American life. Both the characters of Matthew and Elizabeth appear to be "ex-hippies" who have abandoned their youthful utopian dreams sometime in the 1970s by going to work for the city of San Francisco as health inspectors, thereby becoming part of "the system", which foreshadows both characters' replacement by the pod people. Likewise, the Bellicecs are products of the counterculture of the 1960s. Jack Bellicec wears a shabby U.S. Army jacket and has a deep distrust of the U.S. government, which implies that he was involved in protest movements in the past, perhaps against the Vietnam War. Likewise, Nancy Bellicec believes in UFOs and has a fondness for pseudoscientific literature such as Immanuel Velikovsky's 1950 book Worlds in Collision, which strongly suggests that she believes "in some sort of New Age esotericism". Knöppler wrote: "For the Bellicecs, the revelation of an inhuman, all-encompassing conspiracy that enforces mindless conformity is hardly a paradigm shift – it is the world they already live in. Consequently, the Bellicecs, Nancy in particular, adopt to the new situation rather quickly". Notably, Nancy's "esoteric UFO beliefs" allow her to be the first character to deduce the origins of the pod people and what they are doing, though in the end, the countercultural background of the Bellicecs only proves to be a marginal advantage as "they cannot escape assimilation by the pods, they just see it coming".

The film offers a strong critique of consumerism. Geoffrey spends his free time mindlessly watching television commercials, a trait continued by the pod version of him. The pod version of Geoffrey tells Matthew and Elizabeth to accept replacement because "nothing changes, you have the same life, the same clothes, the same car," a statement that implies that materialism is the only thing that matters in life, and which Geoffrey believes will entice Matthew and Elizabeth to accept being replaced. Likewise, the soulless, emotion-free life of pod people is presented as an improvement by the pod version of Dr. Kibner who says "You'll be born again into an untroubled world. Free of anxiety, fear, hate." In the 1956 version, the equivalent statement was "You'll be born again into an untroubled world. Free of love, desire, ambition and faith," a change of emphasis that implies only unwanted emotions are the issue in 1978 as compared to 1956. The film argues that people in 1970s San Francisco were already living in disengaged states, having shallow relationships with other people, instinctively seeking distance from any problems, and being so preoccupied with consumerism that the pod people take over San Francisco without much of the population noticing. Notably, when the running man tries to warn Matthew and Elizabeth, they shun him as a nuisance. When the running man is killed by the pod people, Matthew and Elizabeth do not stop their car and instead drive on to Dr. Kibner's party to avoid being late, blithely trusting that authorities will handle the incident. At the party, Dr. Kibner tells Elizabeth "you want to shut your feelings off, withdraw. Maybe make believe it wasn't happening, because then you don't have to deal with it," a diagnosis she admits is an accurate summary of her issues with Geoffrey. It is not clear if Dr. Kibner is a pod duplicate at this point in the film, and accordingly one cannot judge if this statement is sincere or an attempt to keep Elizabeth from learning the truth. Regardless, the film does argue that a trend towards "emotional disengagement and apathy" was already prevalent in San Francisco that prefigures the state of being a pod person, who have no feelings at all. Though the pod people are aliens, the film maintains that the state of being a pod person is merely pushing present trends in American life to their logical extremes.

By the 1970s, there were concerns about the decline of the nuclear family and with it traditional American values. Early on, Dr. Kibner states that "the whole family unit is shot to hell," which explains the dysfunctional lives of many Americans. Despite the film's sympathy for the counterculture, Knöppler wrote that the film does seem to express some approval of this thesis, as notably the married Bellicecs seem more happy than Elizabeth does with her common-law relationship with Geoffrey. The character of Dr. Kibner, a successful author of vapid self-help books, satirizes many pop-psychiatry "self-help gurus" popular at the time. Before any evidence of the pod people has emerged, Jack has only already accused Dr. Kibner of trying to "change people to fit the world," a description that equally fits the pod version of Dr. Kibner. The film expresses much distrust of psychiatrists such as Kibner, who are portrayed as seeking to limit the human experiences and promoting a deracinated consumerism. Unlike the 1956 version, where the U.S. government is presented as a benign force, which once alerted to the pod invasion, promptly takes action by quarantining the pod-infested small town of Santa Mira (though this happy ending was added at the insistence of the studio), the government is presented as a far more sinister and malign force in the 1978 version. The pod people appear to take complete control of the state, and ruthlessly use the power of the state to complete their conquest of the earth. Even the few civil servants who possibly were not replaced appear as ineffective. Knöppler argued that the change in the view of the government from 1956 to 1978 reflected the legacy of the Vietnam War and the Watergate scandal, which caused many Americans to have a jaundiced view of their government.

== See also ==
- List of science fiction horror films
- List of science fiction films of the 1970s
- List of American films of 1978
- List of cult films

== Works cited ==
- Barsanti, Chris (2014). The Sci-Fi Movie Guide: The Universe of Film from Alien to Zardoz. Visible Ink Press. ISBN 978-1-578-59533-4.
- Booker, M. Keith (2006). Alternate Americas: Science Fiction Film and American Culture. Greenwood Publishing Group. ISBN 978-0-275-98395-6.
- Knöppler, Christian (2017). The Monster Always Returns: American Horror Films and Their Remakes. Bielefeld: transcript Verlag. ISBN 978-3839437353.
