= Fear City (disambiguation) =

Fear City is a 1984 American film.

Fear City may also refer to:

- Fear City: New York vs the Mafia, a 2020 documentary series
- Fear City pamphlets
- "Fear City", a song by Elliott Smith from the 2007 album New Moon
- "Fear City", an episode of the television series Night Man
- "Dateline: Fear City", an episode of the television series Kingston: Confidential
- Fear City: New York's Fiscal Crisis and the Rise of Austerity Politics, a 2018 book by Kim Phillips-Fein

== See also ==
- City of Fear (disambiguation)
