= Ms .45 =

1981 film by Abel Ferrara

- Theatrical release poster
- Directed by: Abel Ferrara
- Written by: Nicholas St. John
- Produced by: Richard Howorth; Mary Kane
- Starring: Zoë Lund
- Cinematography: James Lemmo
- Edited by: Christopher Andrews
- Music by: Joe Delia
- Production company: Navaron Films
- Distributed by: Rochelle Films (U.S.); Warner Bros. Pictures (International)
- Release date: May 15, 1981
- Running time: 80 minutes
- Country: United States
- Language: English
- Budget: $62,000

Ms .45 (initially released internationally as Angel of Vengeance) is a 1981 American neo-noir exploitation thriller film directed by Abel Ferrara, written by Nicholas St. John, and starring Zoë Lund. It is a rape and revenge story about Thana (Lund), a mute woman who becomes a spree killer after she is raped twice in one day when going home from work.

The film was critically detested on its theatrical release, but is now generally highly regarded among fans of underground and independent film.

== Plot ==
While walking home from work, Thana, (Note: Thana's name is an allusion to Thanatos, the Greek god of death.) a mute seamstress in New York City's Garment District, is raped at gunpoint in an alley by a masked attacker. Returning to her apartment, she is raped a second time by a burglar. Thana strikes this second assailant with a small glass apple, then bludgeons him to death with an iron, before carrying his body to the bathtub. The next day at work, Thana goes into shock after watching her boss Albert rip a shirt off a mannequin, which worries her co-workers.

After being sent home, Thana dismembers the burglar's body, keeping his .45 caliber pistol. She places the pieces of the body into plastic garbage bags and stores them in her refrigerator. After cleaning her bathtub, she decides to take a shower, but as she strips, she hallucinates the first attacker in the mirror grabbing her breast, horrifying her. She also notices that organs and body fluids from the burglar are overflowing in the drain. Mrs. Nasone, Thana's nosy neighbor and landlady, begins to notice her odd behavior.

The next day, while disposing of one of the bagged body parts, Thana is noticed by a leering young man on the street. Thinking that she accidentally dropped the bag, he retrieves it, frightening her. He chases her through the alleys of the city and, fearing another sexual assault, she fatally shoots him when she is cornered by him. Following the incident, Mrs. Nasone spots Thana rushing up the stairs and throwing up. She insists on calling a doctor for Thana. Meanwhile, Mrs. Nasone's dog, Phil, starts to become attracted to her refrigerator. Thana escorts her out of her apartment while still in shock.

As the limbs start to attract the attention of the media, Albert brings Thana into his office and invites her to a Halloween party that he is throwing for work, telling her that there will be "many boys there [her] age" while stroking her neck. She responds to him in writing, saying, "I'll try." As her quest of vengeance increases, Thana starts regularly targeting and killing several men, including an arrogant fashion photographer, a pimp who assaults a prostitute, several members of a gang seeking to sexually assault her, and a Saudi Arabian businessman and his limousine driver. She pulls the gun on a recently dumped salesman she meets at a bar, but it jams; he grabs it from her, then unjams it and uses it to shoot himself in the head, committing suicide.

Albert notices Thana ditching work after going to lunch with her co-workers, resulting in her co-workers having to cover her share. She promises to go to the party with him in exchange for staying out of trouble for her absence. Thana notices that Phil is attracted to the smell of the burglar's severed parts, growing more interested after she grinds one of them into hamburger and feeds it to him. She takes Phil for a walk, leaves a note saying that Phil ran away but will probably find his way back home soon, then ties him to a post near the river and draws her gun on him.

Thana attends the costume party dressed as a nun in the company of the increasingly lecherous Albert. Mrs. Nasone enters Thana's apartment and finds the burglar's severed head. She assumes that Thana killed Phil and calls the police. At the party, Albert takes Thana upstairs in private and attempts to seduce her, and she shoots him. The people at the party hear the gunshot and run upstairs to Thana, but quickly realize that she is the murderer when she steps out of the room with her pistol. Thana begins a shooting spree, targeting the men present. Her co-worker Laurie picks up a nearby knife and stabs Thana in the back. Thana turns around and points the gun at Laurie, but hesitates; she screams out "Sister!" before she falls to the ground and dies.

Following the party massacre, the tearful Mrs. Nasone holds a memorial for her husband and her dog Phil, but the still-alive Phil makes his way back home and scratches at her apartment door.

== Cast ==
- Zoë Lund (credited as 'Zoë Tamerlis') as Thana
- Albert Sinkys as Albert
- Darlene Stuto as Laurie
- Helen McGara as Carol
- Nike Zachmanoglou as Pamela
- Abel Ferrara (credited as 'Jimmy Laine') as 1st rapist
- Peter Yellen as 2nd rapist
- Editta Sherman as Mrs. Nasone
- Vincent Gruppi as heckler on corner
- S. Edward Singer as the photographer
- James Albanese as Nick
- Jack Thibeau as salesman in the bar

== Production ==
=== Development ===
Abel Ferrara first received the script to Ms .45 in the mail from Nicholas St. John, who scribed the director's previous film, The Driller Killer. While Ferrara has claimed he instantly loved the idea and did not change a thing from what was sent to him, cinematographer James Lemmo noted that the script itself was rather thin. Screenwriter St. John would occasionally add dialogue as shooting continued. Many years later, star Zoë Lund described how minimal the script was, which she acknowledged was uncharacteristic of Ferrara's later films.

=== Filming ===
Principal photography for the film took place on location in New York City over four weeks in February and March 1980, often without official filming permits. The film's budget was approximately US$62,000 (approximately US$228,600 in 2026).

== Release ==
Ms .45 was distributed by Rochelle Films in the United States, with Warner Bros. handling international distribution. It premiered in New York City on May 15, 1981, with a Los Angeles release on November 13, 1981.

=== Home media ===
In 1983, the film was released on VHS by U.S.A. Home Video in its uncut form. Ms .45 was released on DVD in the United States in April 2000, by Image Entertainment, but was re-edited for DVD release. The re-edit removes less than a minute, total. The cuts include changes to the first rape, featuring Ferrara's cameo, which is split by an insert shot from a later scene. The second rape is more drastically cut, omitting the line, "This oughta make you talk, huh?" The climactic Halloween party shootout was also re-cut to remove an onscreen murder, which now occurs offscreen.

It was acquired by Alamo Drafthouse Films in October 2013 and remastered in HD from the original negatives. The distributor released the film on Blu-ray, DVD, and digital copy in March 2014. In July 2025, Arrow Films announced a 4K UHD Blu-ray release that was released on October 28, 2025.

== Reception ==
Upon its release in 1981, Janet Maslin of The New York Times gave Ms .45 a negative review, praising Tamerlis's acting but describing the rest of the casting as "disastrous", and finding that "most of the walk-ons read their one or two lines with remarkable discomfort". Praising Ferrara's direction, Maslin remarked that "[o]ne can only hope he finds something else to make movies about very soon."

On review aggregator website Rotten Tomatoes, Ms .45 holds an approval rating of 86% based on 35 reviews, with an average rating of 7.4/10. On Metacritic, the film has a score of 62 out of 100 based on 6 critics, indicating "Generally favorable reviews".

== In popular culture ==
In The Next Episode (Euphoria), Kat Hernandez (Barbie Ferreira) dresses up as Thana for Halloween.

== See also ==
- List of American independent films
- List of cult films
- Neo-noir

== Sources ==
- Heller-Nicholas, Alexandra (2017). Ms. 45. New York City, New York: Columbia University Press. ISBN 978-0-231-85105-3.
