= 12th Independent Spirit Awards =

US film awards ceremony in 1997

- Date: March 22, 1997
- Site: Santa Monica, California, U.S.
- Hosted by: Samuel L. Jackson

Highlights
- Best Film: Fargo
- Most awards: Fargo (6)
- Most nominations: Fargo (6)

The 12th Independent Spirit Awards, honoring the best in independent filmmaking for 1996, were announced on March 22, 1997. It was hosted by Samuel L. Jackson.

== Nominees and winners ==
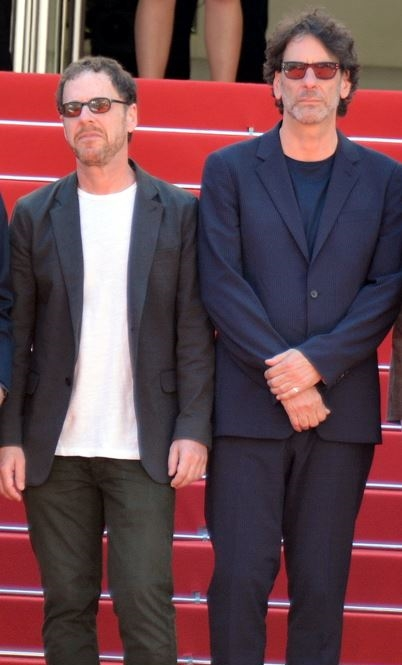
Joel and Ethan Coen, winners of Best Screenplay

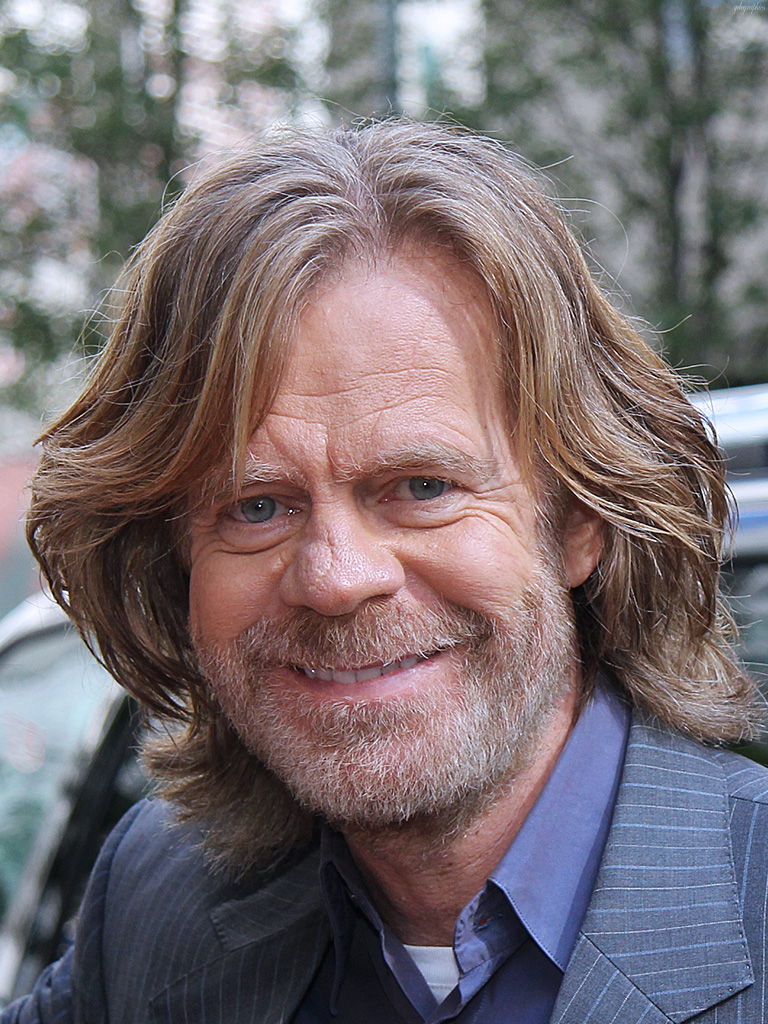
William H. Macy, winner of Best Male Lead

Frances McDormand, winner of Best Female Lead

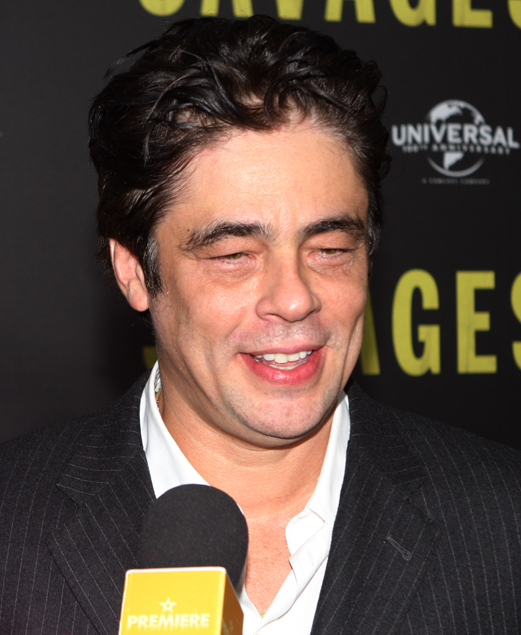
Benicio del Toro, winner of Best Supporting Male

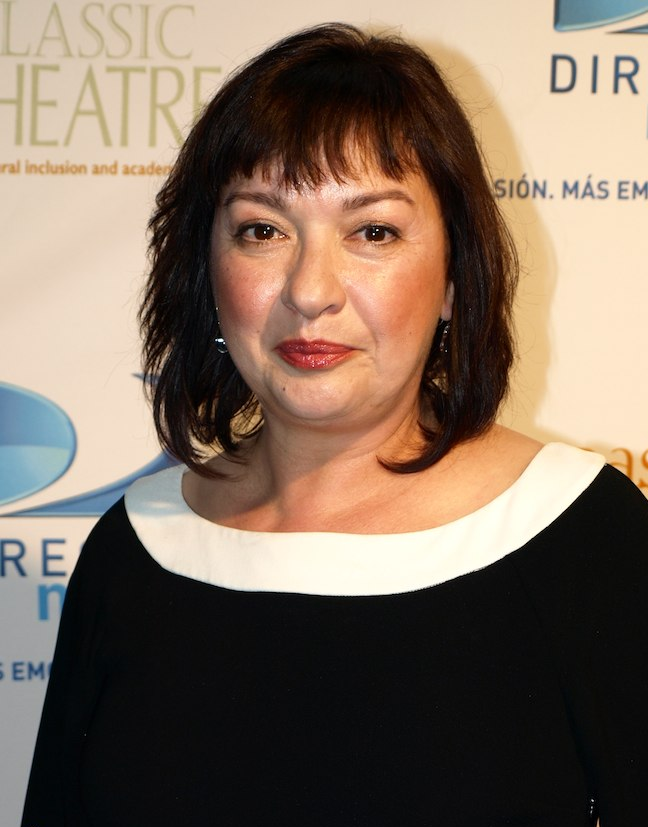
Elizabeth Peña, winner of Best Supporting Female

Best Feature	Best Director
Fargo: Dead Man; The Funeral; Lone Star; Welcome to the Dollhouse	Joel Coen – Fargo: Abel Ferrara – The Funeral; David O. Russell – Flirting with Disaster; Todd Solondz – Welcome to the Dollhouse; Robert M. Young – Caught
Best Male Lead	Best Female Lead
William H. Macy – Fargo: Chris Cooper – Lone Star; Chris Penn – The Funeral; Tony Shalhoub – Big Night; Stanley Tucci – Big Night	Frances McDormand – Fargo: María Conchita Alonso – Caught; Scarlett Johansson – Manny & Lo; Catherine Keener – Walking and Talking; Renée Zellweger – The Whole Wide World
Best Supporting Male	Best Supporting Female
Benicio del Toro – Basquiat: Kevin Corrigan – Walking and Talking; Matthew Faber – Welcome to the Dollhouse; Gary Farmer – Dead Man; Richard Jenkins – Flirting with Disaster	Elizabeth Peña – Lone Star: Mary Kay Place – Manny & Lo; Queen Latifah – Set It Off; Lili Taylor – Girls Town; Lily Tomlin – Flirting with Disaster
Best Screenplay	Best First Screenplay
Fargo – Joel Coen and Ethan Coen: Dead Man – Jim Jarmusch; Flirting with Disaster – David O. Russell; The Funeral – Nicholas St. John; Lone Star – John Sayles	Big Night – Joseph Tropiano and Stanley Tucci: Girl 6 – Suzan-Lori Parks; Manny & Lo – Lisa Krueger; Trees Lounge – Steve Buscemi; The Whole Wide World – Michael Scott Myers
Best First Feature	Best Debut Performance
Sling Blade: Big Night; I Shot Andy Warhol; Manny & Lo; Trees Lounge	Heather Matarazzo – Welcome to the Dollhouse: Jena Malone – Bastard Out of Carolina; Brendan Sexton III – Welcome to the Dollhouse; Arie Verveen – Caught; Jeffrey Wright – Basquiat
Best Cinematography	Best Foreign Film
Fargo – Roger Deakins: Bound – Bill Pope; Color of a Brisk and Leaping Day – Rob Sweeney; Dead Man – Robby Müller; The Funeral – Ken Kelsch	Secrets & Lies • UK: Breaking the Waves • Denmark; Chungking Express • Hong Kong; Lamerica • Italy; Trainspotting • UK

=== Films that received multiple nominations ===
Nominations	Film
6	Fargo
5	The Funeral
5	Welcome to the Dollhouse
4	Big Night
4	Dead Man
4	Flirting with Disaster
4	Manny & Lo
3	Caught
3	Lone Star
2	Basquiat
2	Trees Lounge
2	Walking and Talking
2	The Whole Wide World

==== Films that won multiple awards ====
Awards	Film
6	Fargo

== Special awards ==
=== Truer Than Fiction Award ===
When We Were Kings

- The Celluloid Closet
- Looking for Richard
- Paradise Lost: The Child Murders at Robin Hood Hills
- Troublesome Creek: A Midwestern

=== Someone to Watch Award ===
Larry Fessenden – Habit

- Joe Brewster – The Keeper
- Chris Smith – American Job
