= Yes Day =

2021 family comedy film

- Official release poster
- Directed by: Miguel Arteta
- Screenplay by: Justin Malen
- Screen story by: Justin Malen
- Based on: Yes Day by Amy Krouse Rosenthal; Tom Lichtenheld
- Produced by: Lawrence Grey; Ben Everard; Daniel Rappaport; Nicole King Solaka; Jennifer Garner
- Starring: Jennifer Garner; Édgar Ramírez; Jenna Ortega
- Cinematography: Terry Stacey
- Edited by: Jay Deuby
- Music by: Michael Andrews
- Production companies: Grey Matter Productions; Entertainment 360
- Distributed by: Netflix
- Release date: March 12, 2021
- Running time: 86 minutes
- Country: United States
- Language: English

Yes Day is a 2021 American family comedy film directed by Miguel Arteta, from a screenplay and screen story by Justin Malen, based upon the children's book of the same name by Amy Krouse Rosenthal and Tom Lichtenheld. It stars Jennifer Garner, Édgar Ramírez, and Jenna Ortega.

The movie was released on March 12, 2021 on Netflix. It received mixed reviews from critics, who praised the acting (particularly that of Ortega) but criticized its writing and humor. At the 2021 Imagen Awards, Ortega was nominated for Best Actress in a Feature Film. A sequel is in development.

== Plot ==
Allison and Carlos Torres are married with three children: Katie, Nando, and Ellie. When they first met, they were adventurous and said yes to everything. However, once having children, they feel they must say no to protect them.

One evening, they are called into a parent-teacher conference at school where they discover Katie and Nando have both submitted homework calling their mom a dictator. Allison expresses frustration that her children perceive her this way and tells Carlos that she feels he makes her play the role of "bad cop" with their children. Mr. Deacon, a school employee and father of six, overhears and shares with them that he maintains order in his house by having a 'yes day' from time to time: one 24-hour period where the parents cannot say no, within reason.

Carlos and Allison present the idea to their family, telling them that if they don't get into trouble, do their chores, and keep their grades up, they can have a yes day as a reward. Katie makes a wager with Allison that if her mom makes it through Yes Day, Katie will go to the music festival Fleek Fest with her mother. If she doesn't make it, Katie will be allowed to go with a friend, Layla. The children eventually manage to earn a yes day and put together a list of five activities for the day. The first three are Ellie dressing her parents in crazy outfits and requesting that they don't look at anything with a screen on it all day, ordering a massive $40 sundae that is free if they can eat it all in 30 minutes (they do), going through a car wash with the windows down, and entering a capture-the-flag competition, where each family member leads a group; the goal is for one team to catch the others, throwing balloons filled with Kool-Aid at their opponents. Allison wins the game for her team, winning the children's approval. Carlos, however, is tempted to drop out of Yes Day, but ultimately decides he can't bear to disappoint his family.

The fourth event is a trip to Six Flags Magic Mountain. When Katie steps away, Allison sees texts on her daughter's phone from Layla indicating she and Katie will be hanging out with older boys at Fleekfest. Allison tells her that the wager is off and she's going to Fleekfest with her, not Layla. Hurt, Katie storms off. In an attempt to win a pink gorilla for Katie as an apology, Allison and Carlos get into a fight with another park-goer and are arrested. The children sneak away. Katie goes to Fleekfest with Layla but quickly becomes uncomfortable being alone with older boys, and her friend abandons her. Nando stages a "nerd party" at the house as the final big event, but it quickly gets out of control when Ellie accidentally sets off a foam explosion inside the house that was meant for the backyard. Meanwhile, Katie's phone dies while trying to contact her siblings and she panics. With help from H.E.R., who is performing at the event, Allison finds Katie and they reconcile. H.E.R. is moved and invites them on stage for a song. Carlos arrives home and finally manages to be a disciplinarian, forcing the party to stop and the children to help with the cleanup. As Yes Day draws to a close, Ellie makes one final request. They all spend the night playing games as a family in a tent in the backyard, until Nando's foam bomb (having been flushed down the toilet) starts to fill up the house.

In a mid-credits scene, the Torres family and other players pelt Mr. Deacon with Kool-Aid balloons at the Capture the Flag field as revenge for suggesting Yes Day in the first place.

== Cast ==
- Jennifer Garner as Allison Torres
- Édgar Ramírez as Carlos Torres
- Jenna Ortega as Katerina "Katie" Torres
- Julian Lerner as Evan "Nando" Torres
- Everly Carganilla as Ellie Torres
- H.E.R. as herself
- Nat Faxon as Mr. Deacon
- Molly Sims as Hiring Executive
- Fortune Feimster as Jean the Paramedic
- Arturo Castro as Officer Jones
- Tracie Thoms as Billie / Concert Coordinator
- Megan Stott as Layla
- Yimmy Yim as Tara
- Snowden Grey as Hailey Peterson
- Graham Phillips as Brian
- Leonardo Nam as Mr. Chan
- Hayden Szeto as Officer Chang

== Production ==
In September 2018, it was announced that Jennifer Garner had joined the cast of the film, with Miguel Arteta directing from a screenplay by Justin Malen, with Netflix distributing. In October 2019, Jenna Ortega, Édgar Ramírez and Julian Lerner joined the cast of the film. In April 2020, Megan Stott announced she had joined the cast of the film.

Principal photography began in November 2019 in Los Angeles.

The film features a number of songs, including a rendition of "Baby I Need Your Loving" by H.E.R., Garner, and Ortega. Other songs include "I'm a Gummy Bear", "Epic", and "Slide". The band Allah-Las also made a cameo while performing "Catamaran".

== Reception ==
=== Ratings ===
A week following the film's digital release on March 12, 2021, Netflix reported the film had been watched by 53 million households. A month later, in April 2021 the viewership increased to 62 million households.

=== Critical response ===
On review aggregator website Rotten Tomatoes the film has an approval rating of 52% based on 66 reviews, with an average rating of 5.30/10. The website's critics consensus reads, "Yes Day fails to take full advantage of its wish-fulfillment premise, aiming for family fun but settling for harmlessly mediocre." On Metacritic, the film has a weighted average score of 46 out of 100 based on 14 critics, indicating "mixed or average reviews".

=== Accolades ===
Year	Award	Category	Nominee(s)	Result	Ref.
2021	Imagen Awards	Best Actress in a Feature Film	Jenna Ortega	Nominated	

== Sequel ==
In July 2021, it was announced that a sequel was in development.
