= Things We Never Got Over =

American television series

- Based on: Things We Never Got Over by Lucy Score
- Screenplay by: Eric Charmelo; Nicole Snyder
- Directed by: Jennifer Morrison; Tim Andrew
- Starring: Molly Griggs; Matthew Noszka; Tommy Martinez; Sean Teale; Sarah Jeffery; Megan Stott; Lili Simmons; Anthony Keyvan; JoBeth Williams
- Country of origin: United States
- Original language: English

Production
- Executive producers: Eric Charmelo; Nicole Snyder; Jennifer Morrison; Gina Girolamo
- Production companies: Amazon MGM Studios; Strega Stories

Original release
- Network: Amazon Prime Video

Things We Never Got Over is an upcoming Amazon Prime Video television series adaptation of the novel of the same name by Lucy Score. The cast is led by Molly Griggs, Matthew Noszka and Tommy Martinez.

== Premise ==
Having ran from the altar at her wedding day, Naomi Witt travels to Knockemout, Virginia and her estranged twin, Tina, but when Tina disappears, Nina is left in the strange town looking after her niece.

== Cast ==
- Molly Griggs as Naomi Witt and Tina Witt
- Matthew Noszka as Knox Morgan
- Tommy Martinez as Mash Morgan
- Sean Teale as Lucian
- Sarah Jeffery as Sloane
- Megan Stott as Waylay
- Lili Simmons as Lina
- Anthony Keyvan as Stef
- JoBeth Williams as Liza J.

== Production ==
=== Development ===
In December 2023, Amazon MGM Studios were reported to be developing an adaptation of the Lucy Score bestselling novel Things We Never Got Over, the first part is her Knockemout trilogy, with Amy Rardin as showrunner, executive produce and writer, and PKM’s Patrick Moran and Lynley Bird having developed the project under their overall deal with the studio, and also acting as executive producers. By September 2025, Eric Charmelo and Nicole Snyder were developing the series as showrunners, as well as executive producers, alongside Gina Girolamo for Strega Stories under her overall deal with Amazon MGM Studios, with Score as co-executive producer. It received a series order from Amazon Prime Video in June 2026. In September 2026, Jennifer Morrison was announced as executive producer and director of the first two episodes with Tim Andrew also directing episodes.

=== Casting ===
The cast is led by Molly Griggs, Matthew Noszka and Tommy Martinez, with Griggs playing twin sisters Naomi and Tina Witt with Martinez as Nash Morgan and Noszka as Knox Morgan. In October 2026, Sean Teale, Sarah Jeffery, Megan Stott, Lili Simmons, Anthony Keyvan, and JoBeth Williams joined the cast.

=== Filming ===
Filming took place in Vancouver, Canada, in late 2026, with filming scheduled to run from 8 September to 15 December 2026.
