= 1996 New York Film Critics Circle Awards =

62nd New York Film Critics Circle Awards

62nd New York Film Critics Circle Awards

announced: December 12, 1996
given: January 5, 1997

Best Picture:
Fargo

The 62nd New York Film Critics Circle Awards, honoring the best in film for 1996, were announced on December 12, 1996, and given on January 5, 1997.

== Winners ==
- Best Actor:
  - Geoffrey Rush - Shine
  - Runners-up: Daniel Day-Lewis - The Crucible, Kevin Costner - Tin Cup and Tom Cruise - Jerry Maguire
- Actress:
  - Emily Watson - Breaking the Waves
  - Runners-up: Frances McDormand - Fargo and Nicole Kidman - The Portrait of a Lady
- Best Cinematography:
  - Robby Müller - Breaking the Waves and Dead Man
- Best Director:
  - Lars von Trier - Breaking the Waves
- Best Documentary:
  - When We Were Kings
- Best Film:
  - Fargo
  - Runners-up: The People vs. Larry Flynt and Breaking the Waves
- Best Foreign Language Film:
  - The White Balloon • Iran
- Best New Director:
  - Stanley Tucci and Campbell Scott - Big Night
- Best Screenplay:
  - Albert Brooks and Monica Johnson - Mother
- Best Supporting Actor:
  - Harry Belafonte - Kansas City
  - Runners-up: Martin Donovan - The Portrait of a Lady and Tony Shalhoub - Big Night
- Best Supporting Actress:
  - Courtney Love - The People vs. Larry Flynt
  - Runner-up: Barbara Hershey - The Portrait of a Lady
- Most Distinguished Re-issue:
  - Vertigo
- Special Citation:
  - Jonas Mekas; to the president of the Anthology Film Archives for his long contributions to independent film.
