= Robert W. Castle =

American actor

Rev. Robert Wilkinson Castle Jr. (August 29, 1929 – October 27, 2012) was an American Episcopal priest, social activist, and actor. Castle was the subject of the 1992 documentary film Cousin Bobby, which was directed by his cousin, film director Jonathan Demme. His involvement in Demme's documentary led to an unlikely career as an actor in more than a dozen films over the next two decades, including roles in Philadelphia, The Addiction, Beloved, and Rachel Getting Married.

== Life and career ==
Castle was born on August 29, 1929, in Jersey City, New Jersey. He played as a football quarterback at St. Lawrence University, where he received his bachelor's degree. He earned a second degree from the Berkeley Divinity School in New Haven, Connecticut. While still studying at Berkeley, was given an assignment to serve at a predominantly African American Episcopal parish on Manhattan's Lower East Side, sparking a lifelong commitment to civil rights and minority rights.

His first assignment as an Episcopal priest was as a rector at St. John’s Episcopal Church in his native Jersey City from 1960 to 1968. During that time, Castle became very involved with the American civil rights movement, including traveling to Mississippi to march with Martin Luther King Jr.

He became one of the city's most vocal activists. He once dumped large amounts of garbage outside Jersey City Hall as a way to draw attention to the need for more street cleanings. He protested against his own New Jersey Episcopal bishop for his membership in segregated social clubs. Castle also led protests against restaurants, banks, and other businesses because they would not hire minority employees. An opponent of the Vietnam War, he allowed 1960s left-wing groups, including the Black Panthers and Students for a Democratic Society, to use both his home and St. John's Episcopal Church for their meetings.

His views and actions in Jersey City proved so controversial that when he left his post St. John's Church in 1968, no other church in the Episcopal Diocese of Newark would accept him into their parishes. Castle and his family moved to Vermont, where he became involved with social work and operated a general store. Castle was also the football coach for several years at North Country Union High School where he led the team, with his son John at quarterback, to the state championship game in 1981.

== Rector at St. Mary's Episcopal Church ==
Castle next became the rector of St. Mary's Episcopal Church, located on West 126th Street in Manhattan's Harlem neighborhood. He served as rector from 1987 until his retirement in 2000. Castle continued his vocal activism at St. Mary's. In the early 1990s, he protested against the much larger Cathedral of St. John the Divine, also an Episcopal church, for honoring retired General Colin Powell and other leading figures in Operation Desert Storm. He campaigned against gentrification of Harlem other neighborhoods in New York City. Though he was the founder of the St. Mary’s Episcopal Center, an AIDS hospice located in Harlem, Castle protested against himself to demand better contracts and pay for the hospice workers.

St. Mary's Episcopal Church is located directly across the street from the 26th Police Precinct of the NYPD. Castle would put flyers on police cars admonishing the officers for illegally parking on the sidewalk in front of his church. His ongoing parking battle with the NYPD led a to newspaper article on him published during the late 1980s. That article caught the attention of film director Jonathan Demme, a cousin of Castle; both had previously lost touch with one another. In a 1992 interview with NPR, Demme recalled his reaction to the article, "I thought: 'Good Lord. I wonder — no, that couldn’t possibly be cousin Bobby...The good Bobby Castle would never be trashing police cars, for heaven's sake."

== Filmography ==
Year	Title	Role	Notes
1993	Philadelphia	Bud Beckett	
1995	The Addiction	Narrator / Priest	
1996	Big Night	Father O'Brien	
1996	Sleepers	Priest	
1996	The Funeral	Priest	
1997	Cop Land	Chaplain at Joey's Funeral	
1998	Beloved	Mr. Sawyer	
1999	Just the Ticket	Uncle Donald	
2000	Lost Souls	Josef the Doorman	
2002	The Truth About Charlie	Flea Market Bargain Hunter	
2004	The Manchurian Candidate	General Wilson	
2008	Rachel Getting Married	Rehearsal Dinner Guest	(final film role)
