= Cousin Bobby =

1992 American documentary film

- Film poster
- Directed by: Jonathan Demme
- Produced by: Edward Saxon
- Starring: Robert W. Castle
- Cinematography: Ernest Dickerson; Craig Haagensen; Tony Jannelli; Jacek Laskus; Declan Quinn
- Edited by: David Greenwald
- Music by: Anton Sanko
- Production company: Tesauro SA
- Distributed by: Cinevista
- Release dates: May 12, 1992 (Cannes); May 29, 1992 (United States)
- Running time: 70 minutes
- Country: United States
- Language: English

Cousin Bobby is a 1992 American documentary film directed by Jonathan Demme. The film focuses on Demme's cousin, Robert W. Castle, an Episcopal priest in Harlem, New York. It was screened in the Un Certain Regard section at the 1992 Cannes Film Festival.

== Cast ==
- Robert W. Castle
