= The Driller Killer =

1979 film by Abel Ferrara

- Theatrical release poster
- Directed by: Abel Ferrara
- Written by: Nicholas St. John
- Produced by: Rochelle Weisberg
- Starring: Abel Ferrara; Carolyn Marz; Baybi Day; Harry Schultz; Alan Wynroth
- Cinematography: Ken Kelsch
- Edited by: Bonnie Constant; Michael Constant; Orlando Gallini; Abel Ferrara
- Music by: Joe Delia
- Production company: Navaron Films
- Distributed by: Rochelle Films
- Release date: June 15, 1979
- Running time: 96 minutes (theatrical cut); 101 minutes (pre-release cut)
- Country: United States
- Language: English

The Driller Killer (also known as Driller Killer) is a 1979 American black comedy slasher film directed, edited by, and starring Abel Ferrara, from a screenplay by Nicholas St. John. It was Ferrara's first mainstream feature film, following his 1976 pornographic film 9 Lives of a Wet Pussy. The plot concerns Reno Miller (played by Ferrara, under the pseudonym 'Jimmy Laine'), a struggling artist in New York City, turning insane from stress and killing derelicts with a power drill.

In the United Kingdom, the graphic cover art of its 1982 VHS release landed it on a list of "video nasties" that were banned under the Video Recordings Act 1984. An edited version was later granted an 18 certificate and released in 1999, and a full uncut version was approved by the BBFC in 2002.

Due to a lack of proper copyright registration on its initial release, The Driller Killer is in the public domain.

== Plot ==
The Driller Killer (1979)

Artist Reno Miller and his girlfriend Carol enter a Catholic church and approach his estranged, derelict father. The derelict seizes Reno's hand, causing him and Carol to flee from the church. Unknown to Reno, his father slipped him a piece of paper. The father requests a meeting with Reno. Reno denies knowing the homeless man.

Later, at his apartment, Reno receives an electricity bill and a phone bill, both of which he cannot pay along with his monthly apartment rental fee. He shares the apartment with Carol, a former flight attendant, and her drug-addicted lesbian lover, Pamela. The apartment is in a derelict-filled neighborhood in Union Square. Reno visits Dalton, an art gallery owner, and announces he is currently painting a masterpiece. Reno asks for a week's extension and a $500 loan to cover the rent. However, Dalton refuses, saying he has already lent Reno enough money. However, if Reno finishes a satisfactory painting in a week, Dalton will buy it for the agreed amount.

The following day, a rock band called the Roosters begins practicing in a nearby apartment, leaving Reno unnerved and frustrated. At 2:00 in the morning, Reno becomes agitated by the music while painting. After a vision of his blood-saturated image, Reno goes for a walk. He sees an elderly homeless man sleeping in an alley, seizes him, and begins ranting. Reno ducks into the alley with the man, where they see teenage gang members chasing another homeless person. When the gang members are gone from sight, Reno drops the man to the ground and walks away, vowing that he will not end up like a derelict.

The next day, Reno complains to their landlord about the Roosters. However, the landlord refuses to take action because the music does not bother him. He demands the rent money and gives Reno a skinned rabbit for dinner. Reno takes the rabbit home, repeatedly stabbing it during the preparation. During a reprieve from the music, Reno hears voices calling his name and has a vision of Carol with her eyes gouged out.

That night, Reno leaves his apartment and heads outside, armed with a power drill connected to a portable battery pack. He discovers a homeless man inside an abandoned building and kills him. The following evening, Reno, Carol, and Pamela see Tony Coca-Cola and the Roosters at a nightclub. As the Roosters play, Reno becomes irritated by the music and crowd and leaves while Carol and Pamela dance and kiss.

Reno returns to his apartment, grabs his drill, and goes out on a killing spree. Throughout the night, Reno kills homeless people all over the city before returning home to sleep.

Later, Tony visits Reno's apartment to ask Reno to paint a portrait of him. In exchange, Tony agrees to Reno's demand of $500 to cover his overdue rent. As Reno paints, Tony poses by playing his guitar and kissing Pamela. Reno later kills an upset, transient man in a nearby alley. Afterward, Reno completes his painting, then wakes and notifies Pamela and Carol.

The next day, Reno and Carol show the painting to Dalton, who leaves after declaring it "unacceptable." Carol yells at Reno for sitting with a blank expression, which leads her to leave Reno for her ex-husband, Stephen, the following day. That evening, Reno calls Dalton and invites him to see another painting. When Dalton arrives as the Roosters are practicing, a dressed-up Reno kills him with his drill. After visiting the Roosters, Pamela returns to the apartment where, upon the discovery of Dalton's body inside, she flees into the hallway before Reno grabs her.

Across town, Carol is back with Stephen at his apartment. She takes a shower while Stephen prepares tea. Reno enters the apartment, kills Stephen, and then hides his body behind a kitchen counter. After her shower, Carol walks to the bedroom, where Reno hides under the bedcovers. She turns off the lights, gets into bed, and then tells Stephen to "come here," not knowing Reno is inside her bed.

== Cast ==
- Abel Ferrara (as 'Jimmy Laine') as Reno Miller
- Carolyn Marz as Carol Slaughter
- Baybi Day as Pamela Bergling
- Harry Schultz II as Dalton Briggs
- Alan Wynroth as Al, the landlord
- Maria Helhoski as the Nun
- James O'Hara as Man in church
- Richard Howorth as Stephen, Carol's husband
- Douglas Anthony Metrov (as 'Rhodney Montreal') as Tony Coca-Cola
- Trixz Sly as The Roosters manager
- Butch Morris as Sidewalk Beggar

== Production ==
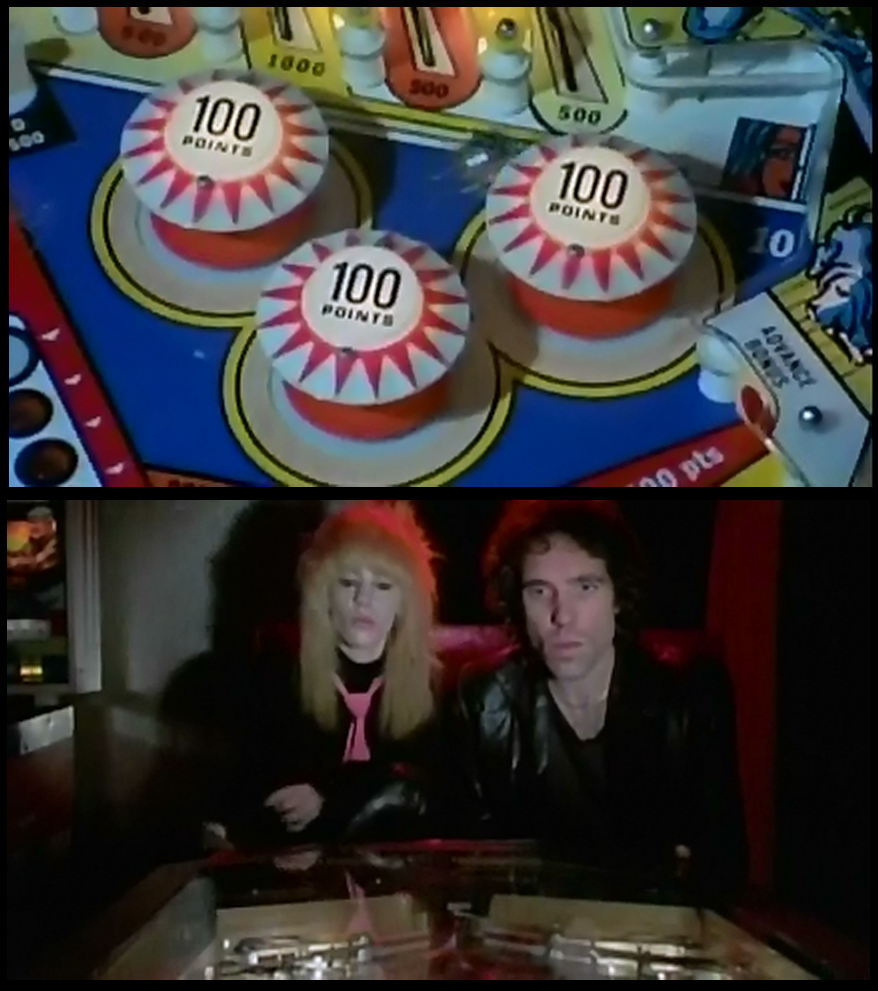
An example of the use of cross-cutting POV shots in the film as the protagonist Reno (on the right) plays pinball while Pamela looks on.

The Driller Killer was filmed on a small budget, with an unknown cast, and produced by Ferrara's own company, Navaron Films, between 1977 and 1978. It was shot on 16mm film and utilized Ferrara's Union Square apartment and adjacent streets as filming locations. It features many of the elements that became trademarks of Ferrara's later films, including Catholic iconography, lesbian scenes, gritty urban locations filmed at night, an eclectic soundtrack combining punk rock and Johann Sebastian Bach, scenes of extreme violence, and religious themes of redemption, salvation and damnation. The punk rock band in the film reflects contemporary NYC punk bands such as the New York Dolls and Television.

In the film's trailer, Reno is heard to say a line from a scene that does not appear in the finished film: "It's just a window, Dalton."

== Release ==
The Driller Killer was released theatrically in the USA on June 15, 1979. Due to a lack of proper copyright registration on its initial release, the film is in the public domain.

On June 10, 2010, it was re-released as video on demand (VOD).

=== Bans ===
When it was released in the UK in 1982, Vipco (Video Instant Picture Company), who held the film's UK video distribution rights, took out full-page advertisements in a number of film magazines that featured the graphic cover art of the VHS release, which depicted one of the Driller Killer's victims being drilled through the forehead. The tagline for the advertising and video box was "There are those who kill violently!"

The advertising resulted in a large number of complaints being filed with the Advertising Standards Agency and opposition to the film from the press and elsewhere; however, it seems that very few of the complainants ever saw the film and instead based their opinions on the poster and title.

The film was lumped together with other "video nasties" released at the time, and a vociferous press campaign was launched to ban them all. Driller Killer was added to the list on July 4, 1983, just a year after its UK VHS release. According to Mike Bor, the Principal Examiner at the BBFC, The Driller Killer was almost single-handedly responsible for the Video Recordings Act 1984, under which it and the other "video nasties" were banned in the UK. According to Ferrara biographer Brad Stevens, the banning of the film was "almost entirely due to the cover of the video". The film was not officially released uncut in the UK until 2002.

In Australia, the film was classified R 18+ by the ACB, and was released uncut on home video on April 29, 1985. It was released on DVD twice in the country: first by Umbrella Entertainment and again on August 9, 2013, when it was re-rated MA 15+.

=== Arrow Video ===
In 2016, the film was remastered and released on Blu-Ray by boutique label Arrow Video.

When Arrow was preparing the film, they discovered that the print they had was five minutes longer than any previous release. They contacted Ferrara, who confirmed it was a pre-release version and that he had intentionally removed the footage before the theatrical release. Arrow obtained permission to include this version as an extra in their release. The additional five minutes are all in the first half of the film and appear at seven points, including a shot of a Goodyear Blimp lasting just a few seconds, a brief lesbian shower scene, and an argument scene. Most of the new footage relates to the characters' development and backstory.

== Reception ==
Reviewers had pointed out that the film was not very violent and is more of a psychodrama. The Driller Killer has a 64% approval rating on Rotten Tomatoes based on 14 reviews; the average rating is 6.06/10.

== Follow-ups ==
=== Remakes ===
In 2007, a remake of the original film was reported to be made by British filmmaker Andrew Jones. This new version of the film was to feature many unusual cameos and an original musical score. The remake would have moved the setting from New York to London and starred David Hess. Jones contacted Baybi Day to help co-produce and have a small acting role in the remake of Driller Killer. The title of the remake was designated Driller Killer Redux. The project came to a halt after a financial deal between the executive producers and the two people who held the rights to the original film could not be reached.

A microbudget British remake was released in 2012 named Driller Killer E2. In 2020 independent filmmaker Matt Jaissle produced and directed a second remake entitled Detroit Driller Killer. A third remake by Rob Oldfield is in development.

=== Sequels ===
A sequel from DRagon Studios is in development, titled Driller Killer 2. Actor Dave Knee is set to play the killer.

Ferrara stated in a July 22, 2025 interview that he is considering making a sequel to the film, tentatively titled Revenge of the Driller Killer.

== In popular culture ==
In 2015, video game developer Puppet Combo created The Power Drill Massacre, a title loosely based on The Driller Killer. The game shares the antagonist's name with the film and uses similar synthesiser noises during the chase moments.

The Swedish crust punk band Driller Killer are named after the film.

== See also ==
- List of films in the public domain in the United States
- List of cult films
- Extreme cinema
- Vulgar auteurism
- No wave cinema
- Art horror
