= Aftermath (2024 American film) =

American action thriller film

- Theatrical release poster
- Directed by: Patrick Lussier
- Screenplay by: Nathan Graham Davis
- Produced by: Brian Pitt; Lucas Jarach; Tim Sullivan; Nicolas Chartier; Jonathan Deckter
- Starring: Dylan Sprouse; Mason Gooding; Megan Stott; Dichen Lachman
- Cinematography: Shelly Johnson
- Music by: Michael Wandmacher
- Production company: Voltage Pictures
- Distributed by: Vertical Entertainment
- Release date: November 1, 2024
- Running time: 95 minutes
- Country: United States
- Language: English

Aftermath is a 2024 American action film directed by Patrick Lussier and produced by Voltage Pictures. It stars Dylan Sprouse, Mason Gooding, Megan Stott and Dichen Lachman.

== Plot ==
Eric Matthew Daniels, an ex-Army Ranger, is driving with his 16-year old sister Maddie and encounters traffic on the Tobin Memorial Bridge outside Boston, Massachusetts. There is a holdup as police transport prisoner Samantha "Doc" Brown.

Revolutionists led by Jimmy use explosives to break the bridge in half, causing chaos. Eric calls 911 and requests SWAT, but has difficulty convincing the dispatch operators about the severity of the events. The revolutionists kill the driver of the police truck and threaten the people stranded on the bridge. They take away cell phones and zip-tie the drivers' hands to their steering wheels.

After Eric frees himself, he gets out of his truck and fatally stabs the revolutionist Tango. Galotti is revealed to have been a 'mole', and is congratulated by Jimmy for helping the guerillas capture the police truck. Doc Brown steals keys from Mr. Wisdom and unlocks her shackles, but does not escape.

Jimmy uses a bazooka to blast a news chopper out of the sky to stun law enforcement. He uses the website freedomrevolutions.org to broadcast footage from the bridge, fatally shooting Galotti for everyone to see. Eric uses a recovered cellphone to call his sister Maddie; he kills the revolutionary guard by Doc's truck.

Over 10 million people view a video uploaded by Jimmy of the hostage situation; he talks to the police with ransom demands. He says Doc falsely testified that Retcon squad one three killed innocent civilians without sanction, and wants a deal with the Pentagon to release the Retcon soldiers. Eric takes his sister out of the car. Doc escapes from her cage after being strangled by Golf, one of Jimmy's men, and pretends be unconscious.

Jimmy uses a drone and catches a glimpse of Eric's face. Eric gets on a motorcycle with his sister to jump over the gap in the bridge, but is prevented from doing so by Jimmy, who blows another hole in the bridge. Eric and Maddie come down one level under the bridge and see a set of explosives rigged to blow up more of the underside of the bridge. Maddie asks Eric to help the hostages, so they climb back up and befriend Ozzie, who takes Maddie in his car and gives Eric his phone.

Doc is captured by Jimmy, who knocks her down and ties her up. The video of the hostage situation has now reached 47 million viewers. Jimmy swallows some pills and thuds to his knees. As the pills fall on the ground, Doc recognizes them as cancer drugs, so Jimmy admits having a brain tumor. Eric goes under the bridge and is able to defuse the bombs there, but Maddie is captured. Jimmy forces her to speak with Eric, making him surrender.

Jimmy gives Doc a document to read on camera, with a confession that she was once with Retcon One Three, and that a "Shattered Dove initiative" explicitly permitted civilian deaths during the pursuit of high-value targets. Meanwhile, Eric frees himself and attacks Jimmy, causing Maddie to escape and Doc to get shot. Eric is beaten and restrained by Jimmy, who reveals extra contingency explosives in his truck, besides what was underneath the bridge. He picks up a dead man's trigger connected to them, and uses a rope to drop down from the bridge and set off the explosives. But before he can do so, Eric uses a gun to press down on the truck's gas pedal so the truck falls on Jimmy and sets off the explosives killing only him and his extraction team below.

Three weeks later, a Congressional hearing is held for the misuse of military contractors. Doc is freed due to her valor and heroism, and Eric and Maddie take her out for a cup of coffee.

== Cast ==
- Dylan Sprouse as Eric Daniels
- Mason Gooding as Jimmy
- Dichen Lachman as Doc
- Megan Stott as Madeline Daniels
- Kevin Chapman as Inspector Grimes
- Will Lyman as Joe
- Shahjehan Khan as Ozzie
- Derek K. Moore as Echo
- Jason Armani Martinez as Foxtrot
- Ashley Pynn as Sierra
- Daniel Rios Jr. as Kilo
- Nick Apostolides as Galotti

== Production ==
The film is directed by Patrick Lussier and written by Nathan Graham Davis. It was produced by Brian Pitt, Lucas Jarach and Tim Sullivan for Voltage Pictures.

The script was first written in September 2011. By January 2012 Davis had written the fourth draft and according to several professional writers it was ready to be sent out to managers. By April 2012 the production company Millar/Gough Ink came aboard with a plan to take it to major studios. Adi Shankar 'optioned' the screenplay, but after a year the option ran out.

In June 2021 the script was 'dusted off', so to speak - to quote Davis' website, 'I spent about 8 hours tweaking a few lines and updated the tech and pop culture references so it wouldn’t feel dated, and then I shipped it off to that website. It earned itself an 8.'. Jeff Belkin picked up the script in August 2021 and sent it to Timothy C. Sullivan, a freshly-signed producer to Voltage Pictures. Consequently the script underwent two rewrites from September to November 2021. The producers then realised that Dylan Sprouse could be cast as the lead, so some major changes were made to the script, like changing the age of the lead - Eric in the script - and his daughter, which became his sister. On the 1st January 2022 he turned in his final draft, and after eleven years the film was greenlit. By May there were two passes from the director, Patrick Lussier, and the film went into production.

The cast is led by Dylan Sprouse, Mason Gooding, Dichen Lachman, Megan Stott, Kevin Chapman and Will Lyman. The cast also includes Derek K. Moore, Jason Armani Martinez, Daniel Rios Jr. and Ashley Pynn.

Principal photography took place in Boston, Massachusetts and had entered post-production by the end of January 2023. Former and current military personnel were on the set for filming to act as advisors on the production.

== Release ==
The film was distributed by Voltage Pictures and had a limited theatrical release on November 1, 2024. It also became available digitally on that date. On February 10, 2025, it became available on streaming service Netflix.

== Viewership ==
According to data from Showlabs, Aftermath ranked second on Netflix in the United States during the week of 10–16 February 2025.
