= Fear City =

1984 film by Abel Ferrara

- Theatrical release poster
- Directed by: Abel Ferrara
- Written by: Nicholas St. John
- Produced by: Bruce Cohn Curtis
- Starring: Tom Berenger; Billy Dee Williams; Jack Scalia; Melanie Griffith; Rossano Brazzi; Rae Dawn Chong; Joe Santos; Michael V. Gazzo; Jan Murray; Maria Conchita Alonso; Ola Ray
- Cinematography: James Lemmo
- Edited by: Jack W. Holmes; Anthony Redman
- Music by: Dick Halligan
- Production company: Zupnik-Curtis Enterprises; Rebecca Productions; 20th Century Fox
- Distributed by: Aquarius Releasing
- Release dates: July 18, 1984 (France); February 16, 1985 (New York)
- Running time: 95 minutes
- Country: United States
- Language: English
- Budget: $4 million

Fear City is a 1984 American neo-noir erotic thriller film directed by Abel Ferrara, and written by his longtime collaborator Nicholas St. John. It stars Tom Berenger, Billy Dee Williams, Jack Scalia, and Melanie Griffith in the leading roles, with Rossano Brazzi, Rae Dawn Chong, Joe Santos, Michael V. Gazzo, and Jan Murray in supporting roles.

The film follows a former boxer turned mob-connected nightclub promoter (Berenger) and a fiercely driven police Detective (Williams), investigating a brutal serial killer targeting strippers in Manhattan. The title alludes to the Fear City pamphlets distributed by the New York Police Department.

Fear City premiered in France on July 18, 1984, before being released in the United States by Aquarius Releasing on February 16, 1985. It received mixed reviews.

== Plot ==
Best friends Matt Rossi and Nicky Parzeno run a management company for Manhattan’s best exotic dancers, managing and booking their clients into clubs across the borough. Rossi was once in a relationship with their top client Loretta, but they broke up because Rossi's memories of accidentally killing an opponent in the ring during his days as a professional boxer left him emotionally barren. Loretta still cares for Matt but has moved onto a lesbian relationship with another dancer named Leila.

One night, one of their dancers Honey is targeted by a brutal assailant who beats and mutilates her. Rossi and Parzeno immediately suspect rival promoter Lou Goldstein, but he vehemently denies any involvement. Vice Detective Al Wheeler is put on the case, displaying nothing but contempt towards Rossi and his colleagues and their occupation, and convinced that they realize more than they are letting on. Soon, Leila is also attacked by the unidentified stalker and is hospitalized with severe injuries, leaving Rossi and Parzeno’s clients unwilling to work for fear of being targeted. The movie spends time showing the killer, a young man with a cold expression on his face, writing about his attacks and going through martial-arts routines in his barren loft that has human anatomy posters on the walls (the doctors from his earlier assaults note that the slashes to the women avoided any potentially lethal arteries or organ areas).

Rossi and Loretta slowly begin to rekindle their relationship, while Wheeler begins to suspect that the attacks may not be gang-related, but instead the work of a single person. When another dancer is killed in her own apartment, and one of Goldstein's dancers is murdered in a park, Parzeno and Goldstein reach an agreement to provide security and transportation for their dancers. But after another dancer is decapitated by a sword, Rossi and Parzeno’s business is left effectively destitute. Loretta begins a downward spiral into drug addiction after Leila dies of her injuries in the hospital. Rossi and Parzeno stalk and attack a man in one of their clubs, mistakenly believing he is the killer, and drawing the ire of Wheeler in the process.

While Matt is harshly interrogated by the Detective, Parzeno and his girlfriend Ruby are ambushed by the killer. They manage to fend him off long enough for help to arrive, but Parzeno is severely injured and hospitalized in the process. Hungry for vengeance and seeking guidance, Rossi visits a local mafioso named Carmine, with whom he built omerta many years ago when he witnessed him kill someone in a drive-by shooting and didn't report it to the police. Carmine tells Rossi in no uncertain terms to find the assailant and kill him, and Rossi begins preparing himself for the inevitable encounter.

When Loretta asks Ruby for money, Ruby gives her cab fare, and directs her to go straight home. However, Loretta takes the money to her dealer, where she discovers his body hanging in an alley. The killer, laying in wait, stabs Loretta in the leg before Rossi arrives. Loretta goes for help as Matt fights the killer. Matt takes several hits, then taps into his boxing memories and begins landing a series of punches against the killer, leaving his face bloody and swollen before winding up for a final belt that sends him crashing to the pavement. Wheeler and his partner show up, confirming that the killer is dead. Loretta is brought back to the scene by patrolmen whom she told of the attack and embraces Rossi. Wheeler softens towards Rossi, saying he just might be a hero, and letting him leave the area with Loretta.

== Cast ==
Credits from the AFI Catalog of Feature Films:

- Tom Berenger as Matt Rossi
- Billy Dee Williams as Detective Al Wheeler
- Jack Scalia as Nicky Parzeno
- Melanie Griffith as Loretta
- Michael V. Gazzo as Mike
- Rossano Brazzi as Carmine
- Rae Dawn Chong as Leila
- Janet Julian as Ruby
- Jan Murray as Lou Goldstein
- John Foster as Pazzo, the killer
- María Conchita Alonso as Silver Chavez
- Joe Santos as Frank
- Ola Ray as Honey Powers
- Tracy Griffith as Sandra Cook
- Emilia Lesniak as Bibi
- Daniel Faraldo as Sanchez
- Frank Ronzio as Harry
- Emilia Lesniak as Bibi
- Juan Fernández as Jorge

== Production ==
Principal photography began on April 26, 1983 at Raleigh Studios in Los Angeles, followed by location shooting in Manhattan. A working title of the film was Ripper.

The killer (named "Pazzo" - Italian for "Madman" - in the credits, though he is never given a name onscreen) was played by John Foster, a New York City karateka, in his sole acting role. This was also the feature film debut of both Jack Scalia and Tracy Griffith.

Kathryn Doby was the film's choreographer.

=== Music ===
David Johansen contributed two songs to the soundtrack - "New York Doll" and "Sucker City", both written by Ferrara's longtime collaborator Joe Delia. The score was composed by Dick Halligan of the band Blood, Sweat & Tears.

== Release ==
Fear City was originally set to be distributed by 20th Century Fox, which would have made it Ferrara's first film for a major studio. In an interview, Ferrara stated Fox had a two-picture distribution deal with producer Bruce Cohn Curtis (the other film being Dreamscape), but refused to release the film unless significant cuts were made. Even then, the film scored poorly at test screenings.

Ultimately, Fox dropped the film, and it was picked up by independent distributor Aquarius Releasing. The MPAA gave Ferrara's initial cut an X-rating, and Ferrara had to make extensive edits to trim down the amount of violence and nudity.

The film premiered in France on July 18, 1984. It had its US premiere in New York on February 15, 1985, before going to wide release on March 8, 1985.

=== Home media ===
It was originally released on DVD on November 28, 2000, through Anchor Bay Entertainment with the theatrical trailer as a special feature.

On July 17, 2012, the film was released in the United States on Blu-ray Disc by Shout! Factory and includes the approximate 97-minute uncut version and the 95-minute theatrical film release. The sole extra feature is a theatrical trailer. A later edition, featuring a new 2K scan and restoration, was announced for a July 2026 release.

In 2024, a Blu-Ray was released in the UK by 101 Films.

== Reception ==
=== Critical response ===
The film received mixed reviews from critics. On review aggregator Rotten Tomatoes, the film holds an approval rating of 64% based on 11 reviews, with an average rating of 5.6/10. The New York Times film critic Janet Maslin said "Fear City also showcases Mr. Ferrara's skill with action scenes and with nonverbal narration." Maslin continues and describes "Mr. Ferrara's visual talent for the unexpected is not matched by an equivalent gift for character development, but Fear City doesn't attempt to make personality its strong suit. Its biggest selling points, quick pacing and a bright, hard-edged look, are as much as the genre requires." For the Chicago Tribune Gene Siskel criticized the soulfulness of the characters as "Fear City is concerned only with surface thrills--exotic dancers, the martial arts, knife attacks and knockout punches."

A retrospective review in Tilt Magazine described the film as "Ferrara’s transitional work.... from a mind of schlock-aesthete, an answer to Taxi Driver as well as a foundation to Ferrara’s more self-serious works."

Ferrara described the film as a disappointment, and claimed its failure nearly caused the end of his directing career, until he was hired by Michael Mann to direct episodes of Miami Vice.
