= Annabella Sciorra =

American actress (born 1960)

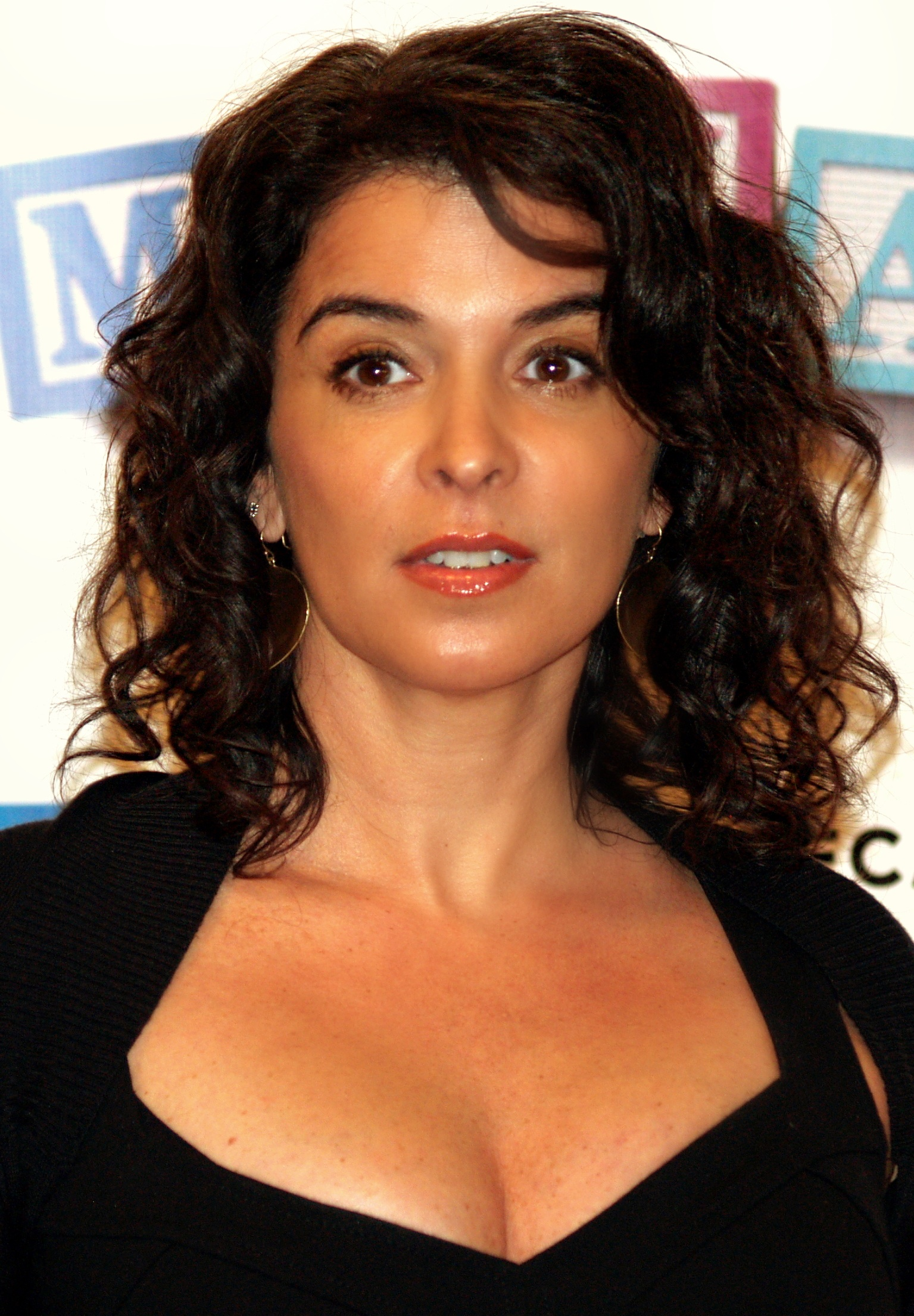
- Sciorra in 2008
- Born: Annabella Gloria Philomena Sciorra; March 29, 1960 (age 66); New York City, New York, U.S. (Note: Although some sources state that Sciorra was born in Weathersfield, Connecticut, Sciorra herself has stated that she was born in New York City.)
- Education: HB Studio; American Academy of Dramatic Arts
- Occupation: Actress
- Years active: 1988–present
- Spouse: Joe Petruzzi (m. 1989; div. 1993)

Annabella Gloria Philomena Sciorra (/ˈʃɔːrə/ SHOR-ə, Italian: [ˈʃɔrra]; born March 29, 1960) is an American actress. She came to prominence with her film debut in True Love (1989) and worked steadily throughout the 1990s in films such as Jungle Fever (1991), The Hard Way (1991), The Hand That Rocks the Cradle (1992), The Addiction (1995), Cop Land (1997), and What Dreams May Come (1998). She received an Emmy Award nomination for her portrayal of Gloria Trillo on The Sopranos (2001–2004), appeared as Detective Carolyn Barek on Law & Order: Criminal Intent (2005–2006), and had recurring roles on GLOW (2018), Truth Be Told (2019–2020), and Tulsa King (2022). Her stage credits include The Motherfucker with the Hat (Broadway, 2011).

Sciorra was regarded as one of the key figures of the #MeToo movement after speaking out against Harvey Weinstein and subsequently testifying at his sexual assault trial.

== Early life ==
Sciorra was born in the Brooklyn borough of New York City to Italian immigrant parents. Her mother was a fashion stylist from Formia, Lazio, and her father a veterinarian from Carunchio, Abruzzo. Sciorra studied dance as a child, and later took drama lessons at the Herbert Berghof Studio and the American Academy of Dramatic Arts.

== Career ==
=== 1989–1990: Film debut and early roles ===
After making her professional debut in 1988 with a small part in the television miniseries The Fortunate Pilgrim, Sciorra landed her first major film role starring as Donna in True Love (1989), a romantic comedy-drama that won the Grand Jury Prize at that year's Sundance Festival. Her performance was praised by critics, with Janet Maslin of The New York Times commenting, "Ms. Sciorra, with her gentle beauty and hard-as-nails negotiating style, perfectly captures the mood of the film, and makes Donna fully and touchingly drawn". The part earned Sciorra a nomination for the Independent Spirit Award for Best Female Lead the following year. Key roles in Internal Affairs, Cadillac Man, and the acclaimed drama Reversal of Fortune (all 1990) came next, with the latter receiving three Oscar nominations.

=== 1991–2000: Critical acclaim and box office successes ===
In 1991, after co-starring in buddy cop comedy The Hard Way, Sciorra garnered widespread attention with her portrayal of Angie Tucci in the acclaimed Spike Lee drama Jungle Fever, which was shortlisted for the Palme d'Or at that year's Cannes Film Festival. In his review for the Los Angeles Times, Kenneth Turan wrote that Sciorra was "possessed of considerable presence, assurance and vulnerability". Meanwhile, Vincent Canby of The New York Times commented:

In a cast of equals, Ms. Sciorra may be just a little more equal than everyone else. She shines. She glows. Her Angie is a delight, a woman of guts and humor and enormous resilience.

The following year, Sciorra headlined Curtis Hanson's hit psychological thriller The Hand That Rocks The Cradle (1992), which held the top position at the U.S. box office for four weeks. Owen Gleiberman of Entertainment Weekly felt that, with her portrayal of Claire Bartel, Sciorrra "brings her eye-of-the-storm serenity to the role of a passionately ordinary middle-class woman", giving an "accomplished performance", while Variety said in their review, "A totally deglamorized Sciorra becomes unglued subtly and slowly, eliciting sympathy without begging for it". In subsequent years, the film has been highlighted as one of the quintessential examples of 1990s genre filmmaking.

Sciorra continued to work steadily throughout the decade. Film parts included romantic leads in The Night We Never Met, neo-noir crime thriller Romeo Is Bleeding, and romantic comedy Mr. Wonderful (all 1993); The Addiction (1995), her first of several projects with cult filmmaker Abel Ferrara; James Mangold's critically acclaimed, financially successful Cop Land (1997); and the fantasy drama What Dreams May Come (1998). Film critic Roger Ebert described her portrayal of Annie Nielsen in the latter as "heartbreakingly effective".

=== 2001–present: The Sopranos and subsequent television work ===
In 2001, Sciorra was nominated for the Primetime Emmy Award for Outstanding Guest Actress for her "electric" portrayal of Gloria Trillo on HBO's The Sopranos, a part described as "career changing" by Entertainment Weekly, which she played intermittently until 2004. Next, she co-starred in the Sidney Lumet-directed Find Me Guilty (2006). Based on the true story of the longest Mafia trial in American history, the film was described as "gripping" by Stephen Holden of The New York Times, who also called Sciorra's performance "excellent".

Subsequent credits included main roles in the CBS courtroom drama series Queens Supreme (2003) and the Fox medical drama Mental (2009), guest parts on shows such as The L Word, ER (both 2007), The Good Wife (2012), Blue Bloods, and CSI (both 2013), and recurring roles on Law & Order: Criminal Intent—as Detective Carolyn Barek (2005–2006)—and GLOW, where she played Rosalie Biagi (2018).

In 2018, Sciorra portrayed Rosalie Carbone on the second season of Netflix's Luke Cage. Executive producer Cheo Hodari Coker said of her casting, "I've been a huge fan of [Sciorra] since Jungle Fever, and [she's] no joke as Rosalie Carbone. You haven't seen her this gangster since ... The Sopranos. I'm thrilled her introduction to the Marvel Universe will be [this show]". Later that year, she reprised the part of Carbone for two episodes of Netflix's Daredevil.

Between 2019 and 2020, Sciorra played Erin Buhrman in seven episodes of the Apple TV+ legal drama Truth Be Told. She has since appeared in recurring roles on NBC's New Amsterdam (2021), the MGM+ crime series Godfather of Harlem (2021), CBS drama Blue Bloods (2021–2022), and the Paramount+ series Tulsa King (2022).

== Personal life ==
Sciorra was married to actor Joe Petruzzi from 1989 to 1993. In 2004, she began a relationship with Bobby Cannavale which lasted for three years; the relationship ended in 2007.

In October 2017, Sciorra leveled allegations of rape against the film producer Harvey Weinstein. In an article published by The New Yorker, Sciorra alleged that Weinstein raped her after he forced his way into her apartment in 1993, then over a number of years repeatedly harassed her. Sciorra was the key witness addressing the predatory sexual assault charges during Weinstein's trial in 2020, leading to his conviction.

== Filmography ==
=== Film ===
Year	Title	Role	Notes
1989	True Love	Donna	
1990	Internal Affairs	Heather Peck	
1990	Cadillac Man	Donna	
1990	Reversal of Fortune	Sarah	
1991	The Hard Way	Susan	
1991	Jungle Fever	Angie Tucci	
1992	The Hand That Rocks the Cradle	Claire Bartel	
1992	Whispers in the Dark	Ann Hecker	
1993	The Night We Never Met	Ellen Holder	
1993	Romeo Is Bleeding	Natalie Grimaldi	
1993	Mr. Wonderful	Leonora	
1995	The Addiction	Casanova	
1995	The Cure	Linda	
1996	The Innocent Sleep	Billie Hayman	
1996	Underworld	Dr. Leah	
1996	The Funeral	Jean	
1997	Little City	Nina	
1997	Destination Anywhere: The Film	Dorothy	
1997	Cop Land	Liz Randone	
1997	Mr. Jealousy	Ramona Ray	
1997	Highball	Molly	
1998	New Rose Hotel	Madame Rosa	
1998	What Dreams May Come	Annie Collins-Nielsen	
2000	Above Suspicion	Lisa Stockton	
2000	King of the Jungle	Mermaid	
2000	Once in the Life	Maxine	
2001	Sunday	Betibù	
2001	Sam the Man	Cass	
2004	Chasing Liberty	Cynthia Morales	
2004	American Crime	Jane Berger	
2005	12 and Holding	Carla Chuang	
2006	Find Me Guilty	Bella DiNorscio	
2006	Marvelous	Lara	
2012	A Green Story	Chloe	
2013	The Maid's Room	Mrs. Crawford	
2014	Don Peyote	Giulietta	
2014	Friends and Romans	Angela DeMaio	
2014	Wishin' and Hopin'	Ma	
2015	Stranger in the House	Mrs. Menabar	
2015	Alto	Sofia Del Vecchio	
2016	Back in the Day	Mary	
2019	The Kitchen	Maria Coretti	
2021	God the Worm	Samantha	Original title: Before I Go
2023	Fresh Kills	Christine	

=== Television ===
Year	Title	Role	Notes
1988	The Fortunate Pilgrim	Octavia	Miniseries; main cast (3 episodes)
1991	Prison Stories: Women on the Inside	Nicole	Television film
1995	Favorite Deadly Sins	Brenda	Television film
1997	Asteroid	Lily McKee	Television film
2001	Touched by an Angel	Dr. Sarah Conover	Episode: "The Face of God"
2001	Jenifer	Meredith Estess	Television film
2001–2004	The Sopranos	Gloria Trillo	Recurring (7 episodes)
2003	Queens Supreme	Judge Kim Vicidomini	Main cast (13 episodes)
2004	The Handler		Episode: "The Big Fall"
2004	The Madam's Family: The Truth About the Canal Street Brothel	Jeanette Maier	Television film
2004	Identity Theft: The Michelle Brown Story	Connie Volkos	Television film
2005	Law & Order: Trial by Jury	Maggie Dettweiler	Episode: "The Abominable Showman"
2005–2006	Law & Order: Criminal Intent	Detective Carolyn Barek	Recurring (12 episodes)
2007	The L Word	Kate Arden	Recurring (3 episodes)
2007	ER	Diana Moore	2 episodes
2009	Mental	Nora Skoff	Main cast (12 episodes)
2010	The Whole Truth	Madeline Landon	Episode: "When Cougars Attack"
2012	The Good Wife	Lesli Rand	Episode: "Waiting for Knock"
2013	CSI: Crime Scene Investigation	Nancy Brass	2 episodes
2013–2024	Blue Bloods	Dr. Grace Meherin / Faith Marconi	Guest (2013); recurring thereafter (6 episodes)
2014	Taxi Brooklyn	Jeanette Vandercroix	Episode: "Black Widow"
2017	Bull	Assistant District Attorney Shelly Giordano	Episode: "Bring it On"
2018	Luke Cage	Rosalie Carbone	2 episodes
2018	GLOW	Rosalie Biagi	Recurring (3 episodes)
2018	Daredevil	Rosalie Carbone	2 episodes
2019–2020	Truth Be Told	Erin Buhrman	Recurring (8 episodes)
2021	Law & Order: Special Victims Unit	Lieutenant Carolyn Barek	Episode: "Hunt, Trap, Rape, and Release"
2021	New Amsterdam	Dr. Romy Lucio	2 episodes
2021	Godfather of Harlem	Fay Bonanno	2 episodes
2021	The Blacklist	Michaela Belucci	Episode: "The Avenging Angel (No. 49)"
2022–Present	Tulsa King	Joanne Manfredi	Recurring (2022); series regular thereafter (13 episodes)

=== Theatre ===
Year	Title	Role	Notes
1994	Those the River Keeps	Susie	Off-Broadway
1999	The Vagina Monologues	Performer	Off-Broadway
2004	Roar	Hala	Off-Broadway
2007	Spain	Barbara	Off-Broadway
2011	The Motherfucker with the Hat	Victoria	Broadway
2015	A Month in the Country	Lizaveta	Off-Broadway

== Accolades ==
Year	Association	Category	Work	Result
1990	Chicago Film Critics Association	Most Promising Actress	True Love	Nominated
1990	Independent Spirit Awards	Best Female Lead	True Love	Nominated
2001	Primetime Emmy Awards	Outstanding Guest Actress in a Drama Series	The Sopranos	Nominated
2011	Theatre World Award	Lunt-Fontanne Award for Ensemble Excellence	The Motherfucker with the Hat	Won
2020	WorldFest-Houston International Film Festival	Remi Award for Best Actress	God the Worm	Nominated
2021	Denver Film Festival	Career Achievement Award		Won
