= Dangerous Game (1993 film) =

1993 film by Abel Ferrara

- Theatrical release poster
- Directed by: Abel Ferrara
- Written by: Nicholas St. John
- Produced by: Mary Kane
- Starring: Harvey Keitel; Madonna; James Russo
- Cinematography: Ken Kelsch
- Edited by: Anthony Redman
- Music by: Joe Delia
- Production companies: Cecchi Gori Europa; Eye Productions; Maverick Picture Company; Pentamerica
- Distributed by: Metro-Goldwyn-Mayer
- Release dates: September 10, 1993 (Venice); November 11, 1993 (Italy); November 19, 1993 (United States)
- Running time: 109 minutes
- Countries: United States; Italy
- Language: English
- Budget: $10 million
- Box office: $1.2 million

Dangerous Game (also known as Snake Eyes) is a 1993 drama film directed by Abel Ferrara, written by Nicholas St. John, and starring Madonna, Harvey Keitel, and James Russo. The story follows a New York-based filmmaker directing a Hollywood drama about the volatile relationship between a married couple, while simultaneously straining his relationship with his own wife and causing the lines between reality and the film's production to blur.

The film received generally negative reviews from critics, who praised the actors' performances but criticized it as self-indulgent and pretentious on the part of Ferrara. It bombed at the box office, making $1.2 million on a $10 million budget.

== Plot ==
Utilizing a film-within-a-film format, the overall plot involves New York City-based director Eddie Israel directing actors Sarah Jennings and Frank Burns in a Hollywood marital-crisis drama, Mother of Mirrors, which is about a formerly wealthy but unemployed husband who berates his newly religious wife about what he considers her hypocritical aversion to their sex-and-drug lifestyle. During the shooting of that film, Israel becomes more and more demanding of his actors, growing increasingly obsessive with finding the ugly truths beneath the story's surface. All the while, his own carelessness and bad behavior with his own family begins to erode him and to corrode his marriage to Madlyn.

== Cast ==
- Harvey Keitel as Eddie Israel
- Madonna as Sarah Jennings
- James Russo as Francis "Frank" Burns
- Nancy Ferrara as Madlyn Israel. The part was originally offered to Jane Campion.
- Reilly Murphy as Tommy
- Victor Argo as Director of photography
- Leonard L. Thomas as Prop guy
- Randy Sabusawa as Producer
- Christina Fulton as Blonde
- Glenn Plummer as Frank's buddy
- Richard Belzer (cameo)
- Annie McEnroe (cameo)
- Sammy Jack Pressman (cameo)
- Werner Herzog (uncredited, archive footage) as himself

== Release ==
Dangerous Game opened in US theaters on November 19, 1993. In 2007, Ferrara recalled,

Madonna killed it. The first impression people get on a movie is the one that never gets out of their mind. So after Madonna got mixed reviews for doing Body of Evidence, she thought she was going to surprise the critics and badmouth the film. And she actually got good reviews. She never got a good review from the Voice or The New York Times in her life, but she got good reviews for this movie, which she came out and trashed. I'll never forgive her for it.

This was the first production by Madonna's Maverick Picture Company, a division of the newly formed entertainment company Maverick. In a 1996 Time interview, Madonna said she had been "sabotaged" by Ferrara, who re-edited the ending and removed most of the film's humor. She also stated her best acting had been left out of the Final Cut, saying "The movie had such a different texture and meaning and outcome for me. When I went to see a screening of it, I cried. Because I really think I did a good job as an actress. I don’t think it should be called Dangerous Game. It should be called The Bad Director."

In Japan, the film was released under the name Body II as a sequel to Madonna's other 1993 film Body of Evidence which had previously been released as Body. Neither film is directly connected to each other in narrative or storyline. The video release of the film was banned in Ireland; the decision was appealed by PolyGram Filmed Entertainment. A viewing took place on 23 November, where the ban was upheld.

=== Critical reception ===
The film received negative reviews from critics. Review aggregator website Rotten Tomatoes reports that 31% of 16 reviews were positive, with an average rating of 4.09/10.

Both The New York Times and the Los Angeles Times praised Dangerous Game, with Janet Maslin of the former complimenting both Keitel and Madonna for their acting, and admiring the film's "raw, corrosive" quality: "Shot in a grainy, urgent style with occasional lapses into video, it has a fury that goes well beyond the story at hand, and an energy level that transcends the story's self-indulgence. This tough, abrasive film maker is seldom without his deadly serious side. 'Dangerous Game' is angry and painful, and the pain feels real." Kevin Thomas of the Los Angeles Times found it "compelling and explosive", saying, "[I]t's a film of no-holds-barred language, passion and rage, but it's a move away from genre, more a chamber drama than action movie in which violence is more psychic than physical." He called Keitel "the ideal Ferrara star, his control, volcanic emotions and endless capacity for expressiveness and revelation matching up with those very qualities in Ferrara himself." Madonna, he said, "reveals the vulnerability as well as the strength of both the actress and the character she is playing."

In a mixed review, Peter Travers of Rolling Stone called Keitel "superb" and the film "a mesmerizing jigsaw", but found that "Madonna's take on an emotional crackup comes up snake eyes ... and Ferrara's Dangerous Game stops being worth the playing." However, Owen Gleiberman, giving it a C− grade in Entertainment Weekly, called it "an ego-driven botch, one of those dawdlingly self-important, semi-improvised affairs about a director making a movie that turns out to be just like the one you're watching (or is it the other way around?)", but allowed that, "Madonna isn't embarrassing; she plays down the wax-goddess exhibitionism."

Both Siskel & Ebert disliked the film and it later earned a place on their Worst of 1993 show. Siskel described the film in his initial review as "overwrought baloney" which Ebert concurred with and later denounced it as a "violent egotrip by its director Abel Ferrara."

Placing it in his list of the worst films of 1994, Bob Ross of The Tampa Tribune wrote that the film was a "sadly self-indulgent gab-fest" and described it as "sordid, pretentious claptrap."

== Accolades ==
Award	Year	Category	Recipient	Result
Golden Ciak	1993	Best Actor	Harvey Keitel	Won
Venice Film Festival	1993	Golden Lion	Abel Ferrara	Nominated

=== Year-end lists ===
- Dishonorable mention – Glenn Lovell, San Jose Mercury News
