= The Residence (TV series) =

American mystery television series

- Genre: Mystery; Comedy drama; Crime; Thriller
- Created by: Paul William Davies
- Based on: The Residence: Inside the Private World of the White House by Kate Andersen Brower
- Starring: Uzo Aduba; Giancarlo Esposito; Susan Kelechi Watson; Jason Lee; Ken Marino; Edwina Findley; Randall Park; Molly Griggs; Al Mitchell; Dan Perrault; Spencer Garrett; Bronson Pinchot; Isiah Whitlock Jr.; Julieth Restrepo; Mel Rodriguez; Mary Wiseman
- Composer: Mark Mothersbaugh
- Country of origin: United States
- Original language: English
- No. of seasons: 1
- No. of episodes: 8

Production
- Executive producers: Paul William Davies; Shonda Rhimes; Betsy Beers
- Running time: 47–87 minutes
- Production companies: Shondaland; Davies Heavy Industries

Original release
- Network: Netflix
- Release: March 20, 2025

The Residence is an American mystery comedy drama television series created by Paul William Davies for Netflix. Inspired by The Residence: Inside the Private World of the White House by Kate Andersen Brower, the series revolves around a fictional murder scandal involving the staff of the White House. Produced by Shondaland, the series premiered on March 20, 2025.

== Premise ==
Set "upstairs, downstairs, and backstairs" in the White House, Cordelia Cupp, an eccentric detective, arrives on the premises in order to solve a murder that occurred during a state dinner for the Australian prime minister. During the investigation, interpersonal conflicts among the personnel of the residence begin to unfold.

== Cast ==
=== Main ===
- Uzo Aduba as Cordelia Cupp, a consultant with the Metropolitan Police Department, and an avid birder
- Giancarlo Esposito as A. B. Wynter, the White House Chief Usher
- Molly Griggs as Lilly Schumacher, the President's social secretary
- Ken Marino as Harry Hollinger, the President's chief adviser
- Randall Park as Edwin Park, an FBI Special Agent
- Susan Kelechi Watson as Jasmine Haney, a White House Assistant Usher
- Isiah Whitlock Jr. as Larry Dokes, the Chief of Police at the MPD
- Edwina Findley as Sheila Cannon, a White House Butler
- Jason Lee as Tripp Morgan, the President's brother
- Al Mitchell as Rollie Bridgewater, the White House's Head Butler
- Dan Perrault as Colin Trask, Head of the Presidential Detail for the Secret Service
- Bronson Pinchot as Didier Gotthard, the White House executive pastry chef
- Julieth Restrepo as Elsyie Chayle, Housekeeper.
- Mel Rodriguez as Bruce Geller, Engineer
- Mary Wiseman as Marvella, the White House Executive Chef

=== Recurring ===
- Jane Curtin as Nan Cox, the eccentric mother-in-law of the President of the United States
- Eliza Coupe as Margery Bay Bix, Senator from Colorado
- Izzy Diaz as Eddie Gomez, Carpenter
- Paul Fitzgerald as Perry Morgan, the President of the United States
- Barrett Foa as Elliot Morgan, the First Gentleman
- Al Franken as Aaron Filkins, Senator from Washington
- Andrew Friedman as Irv Samuelson, the director of National Park Police
- Spencer Garrett as Wally Glick, the director of the FBI
- Timothy Hornor as Patrick Doumbe, medical devices sales manager. He was granted immunity for testifying before Congress.
- Juliette Jeffers as Angie Huggins, Painter. She and A. B. Wynter played backgammon.
- Julian McMahon as Stephen Roos, the Prime Minister of Australia
- Kylie Minogue as a fictionalized version of herself
- Sumalee Montano as Dana Hammond, White House Chief of Staff
- Brett Tucker as David Rylance, the Foreign Minister of Australia
- Matt Oberg as Nick Simms, the White House Chief Calligrapher
- Taran Killam as St. Pierre, energy medium
- Alexandra Siegel as Valentina Motta, Washington socialite. Party crasher.
- Ryan Farrell as Lorenzo Motta, Washington socialite. Party crasher.
- James Babson as Daryl Armogeda, Operations Supervisor.
- Paul Witten as Jeffrey Hewes, Florist
- Roslyn Gentle as Rachel Middlekauff, Media Tycoon
- Chris Grace as Duane Ladage, Electrician.
- Nathan Lovejoy as Alden Tamridge, the Australian Ambassador to the United States
- Rebecca Field as Emily Mackil, White House Gardener.
- Sonya Leslie as Christy Vail, Head of Housekeeping.
- Jodi Bianca Wise as Melody Roos, the wife of the Prime Minister of Australia. She is allergic to bottlebrush flower.
- Aubrey Wakeling as Walpole Bing, Australian Industrialist.
- Will Dixon as Peter Paris, the Secretary of State.
- J. R. Yenque as Chuy Ornelas, Valet.
- Soledad Campos as Sylvia Banks, Storeroom employee
- J. D. Hall as George McCutcheon, Doorman. He is the great-nephew of George McCutcheon, butler under Harry Truman.
- Stan Sellers as "Little George" McCutcheon, Houseman
- Michael Anthony Spady as "Big George" McCutcheon, Plumber. He is deaf.
- Devika Parikh as Rosalind Chace, White House Curator.
- Catherine Carlen as Kim Abkin, Former First Lady
- Keiko Agena as Liz Hollenbeck, Washington Post reporter
- Jeremiah Felder as Vusi Nhlapho, 12-year old precocious student.
- Ben Prendergast as Hugh Jackman

== Cast of birds ==
Birds play a pivotal role in The Residence. The behavior of several birds offer insights into how Detective Cordelia Cupp approaches solving problems. These are the birds mentioned by Detective Cupp.

Birds Mentioned in The Residence
Episode #	Bird	Time Mentioned
1	Screech Owl	13:19
1	Purple Grackle	13:19
1	Diamorphic Jewel-Babbler	34:09
1	Buff-Collared Nightjar	38:56
1	Song Sparrow	40:08
1	Fox Sparrow	40:23
2	Falcon (generic)	42:21
3	Yellow-Throated Longclaw	8:07
3	Eastern Meadowlark	9:56
4	Tuamotu Sandpiper	1:25
6	Golden-Headed Quetzal	5:23
6	Giant Antpitta (first mention)	5:28
6	Saw-Whet Owl (first mention)	27:18
7	El Oro Parakeet	6:08
7	Long-Wattled Umbrellabird	6:12
7	Pale-Headed Brushfinch	6:17
7	Giant Antpitta (second mention)	6:19
7	Pale-Footed Swallow	6:44
7	Mountain Chickadee	40:21
8	Giant Antpitta (third mention)	6:49
8	Fish Crow	27:04
8	Downy Woodpecker	27:04
8	Saw-Whet Owl (second mention)	27:04
8	Mockingbird	29:34
8	Passenger Pigeon	48:07
8	Malaysian Rail-Babbler	56:14

== Episodes ==
No.	Title	Directed by	Written by	Original release date
1	"The Fall of the House of Usher"	Liza Johnson	Paul William Davies	March 20, 2025
During a White House dinner honoring the Australian Prime Minister, the body of Chief Usher A. B. Wynter is discovered by Nan Cox, President Perry Morgan's mother-in-law. The President's Chief Advisor Harry Hollinger pushes to declare Wynter's death a suicide, but renowned detective and avid birder Cordelia Cupp deduces that Wynter died elsewhere, his suicide was staged, and he is wearing someone else's bloody shirt. Guided by Assistant Chief Usher Jasmine Haney and grudgingly accompanied by FBI Special Agent Edwin Park, Cupp surveys the entire White House, but President Morgan refuses to subject the guests to questioning. Cupp notices Australian Foreign Minister David Rylance is wearing Wynter's shirt, forcing Morgan to lock the White House down. (Episode title alludes to The Fall of the House of Usher, an 1837 short story by Edgar Allan Poe.) Flashforward: Senator Aaron Filkins leads a congressional hearing about the incident, with frequent interruptions by Senator Margery Bay Bix, who accuses the Morgan administration of covering up Wynter's murder.
2	"Dial M for Murder"	Liza Johnson	Paul William Davies	March 20, 2025
Rylance tells Cupp that he and others witnessed Marvella, the White House chef, threaten to kill Wynter. Later having sex with Marvella outside, Rylance bled on his shirt, observing someone smoking under a tree and someone else inside the gardening shed. Wynter exchanged shirts with Rylance, who heard Wynter predict he would be dead by the end of the night after a phone call in his office. In return for Cupp's discretion about his tryst, Rylance arranges for everyone to be held at the White House overnight for Cupp to interview. The call to Wynter's office is traced to the shed, and Cupp, inspired by the hunting patterns of falcons, insists that Wynter's body be taken out the front door. Observing all reactions, her focus turns to pastry chef Didier Gotthard, who is revealed to have removed a bloody knife just before the body was discovered. (Episode title alludes to Dial M for Murder, a 1952 stage play by Frederick Knott, adapted into a 1954 film by Alfred Hitchcock.)
3	"Knives Out"	Liza Johnson	Paul William Davies	March 20, 2025
Cupp learns that Gotthard clashed with Marvella and felt betrayed by Wynter after two major incidents: First, Social Secretary Lilly Schumacher planned a disastrous wellness-themed Christmas and forced Wynter to hide Gotthard's beloved gingerbread White House, where a candy version of Wynter was later found with a knife in its back. Second, during the state dinner, Wynter altered Gotthard's desserts for breaking protocol. Having noticed billiard chalk from the Game Room on Gotthard's coat, Cupp forces him to admit that he found Wynter's body lying beside the knife, stolen from Gotthard's third floor office, which he tried to dispose of in the basement incinerator. Cupp deduces that something has been taken from the shed, and gardener Emily Mackil identifies a leaf from the Cedar of Lebanon outside, leading Cupp to realize that butler Sheila Cannon, whom Rylance saw smoking under the tree, lied about entering the Game Room. (Episode title alludes to Knives Out, a 2019 film directed by Rian Johnson.)
4	"The Last of Sheila"	Liza Johnson	Paul William Davies	March 20, 2025
On a birding trip with her nephew, Cupp explains how a childhood search for her sister's missing sock led to solving her first case. At the state dinner, Cupp learns that Sheila feared she would be fired by Wynter for drunkenly fraternizing with guests. Instead of delivering a bottle of vodka to Nan, Sheila stopped in the Game Room and drank it herself, before noticing someone enter Room 301. The coroner's preliminary findings indicate that Wynter died thirty minutes before Nan discovered his body, which must have been elsewhere when Sheila was in the room. Though the true cause of death was a blow to the head, the body shows signs of poisoning, and the cuts to the wrists were made post-mortem. Examining Room 301, Cupp finds a bloodstain hidden by fresh paint. (Episode title alludes to The Last of Sheila, a 1973 film directed by Herbert Ross.) Flashforward: At the hearing, Park explains that Cupp did not believe in "suspects", but did devote pages in her notebook to Rylance, Marvella, Gotthard, Sheila, and Wynter himself.
5	"The Trouble with Harry"	Jaffar Mahmood	Paul William Davies	March 20, 2025
Vusi, a young White House-enthusiast staying at the Hay-Adams Hotel across the street, tells Cupp he saw a mysterious light in Room 301. Cupp turns her attention to the residents of the third floor: Nan; Tripp Morgan, the President's troublesome brother; and Hollinger. Nan overheard Wynter arguing with Tripp, who feared he would be evicted after Wynter discovered his hoard of stolen items. Engineer Bruce Geller was sent to fix Tripp's toilet, and they accuse each other of badmouthing Wynter. Tripp claims he never left his room, but his smartwatch is revealed to be the mysterious light. While dealing with a pair of party crashers, Wynter feared Hollinger wanted him fired after accusing him of eavesdropping on a clandestine meeting and was later heard threatening to expose someone. (Episode title alludes to The Trouble with Harry, a 1950 novel by Jack Trevor Story, adapted into a 1955 film by Alfred Hitchcock.) Flashforward: Bix demands to know why the committee has not heard from one key figure: Cordelia Cupp herself.
6	"The Third Man"	Jaffar Mahmood	Paul William Davies	March 20, 2025
State dinner guest Kylie Minogue discovers blood in the Lincoln Bedroom, and Cupp is shown the hidden staff passages throughout the White House. Elliot Morgan, the President's husband, denies ordering the Secret Service off the second floor, where a third party crasher was seen. Cupp requests time to find this mysterious "third man", but Park is pressured to end their investigation, and Wynter's death is ruled a suicide. (Episode title alludes to The Third Man, a 1949 film directed by Carol Reed.) Flashforward: Hollinger demands that Filkins strike a deal with Bix, who instead urges the third man to come forward. Birding in the Amazon, Cupp receives a satellite communications package from Park to watch as the third man reveals himself as Patrick Doumbe. Inadvertently brought to the state dinner, Doumbe claims to have walked out the front door, but Vusi confirms this is a lie. Communicating to Filkins through Park, Cupp leads Doumbe to admit that he saw a man dragging a body out of the Yellow Oval Room. Cupp races back to D.C., just missing spotting a giant antpitta.
7	"The Adventure of the Engineer's Thumb"	Jaffar Mahmood	Paul William Davies	March 20, 2025
Hollinger gives Cupp forty-eight hours to reexamine the White House, where Haney is now Chief Usher and Lilly has made extensive changes. Keys found in Wynter's pocket belong to Bruce, who felt deeply unappreciated by Wynter. Lilly reveals that she saw Bruce in the Yellow Oval Room, where she earlier saw Wynter argue with housekeeper Elsyie Chayle. Fearing she would be fired after Wynter learned from her spiteful ex-husband that she lied in her job application, Elsyie confided in Bruce. They each claim they found Wynter dead in the Yellow Oval Room, believing the other killed him. Cupp deduces that Bruce and Elsyie are romantically involved, having bonded while locked down during a terrorist attack; he gave her a necklace symbolizing the Pantheon in Rome, and she gave him a matching keychain. Spending the night in the Yellow Oval Room, Cupp prepares to unravel the truth. (Episode title alludes to The Adventure of the Engineer's Thumb, an 1892 short story by Sir Arthur Conan Doyle.)
8	"The Mystery of the Yellow Room"	Jaffar Mahmood	Paul William Davies	March 20, 2025
The following morning, Cupp leads the suspects on a tour of the murder before revealing the White House–hating Lilly as the killer. When Wynter threatened to expose evidence of her embezzlement, Lilly attempted to poison him during a meeting in the Yellow Oval Room before fatally striking him with a clock. Finding the body and mistakenly thinking Elsyie was the murderer, Bruce dragged the body to the Lincoln Bedroom, before moving the body to Room 301, unaware Tripp was asleep inside. Fearing blame, Tripp moved the body to the Game Room, staged Wynter's suicide with Gotthard's knife after finding the "suicide note" Lilly placed in his pocket, and painted over Wynter's blood in Room 301. Seeing a chance to cover up the evidence, Lilly impersonated Elliot to keep people from the Yellow Oval Room and to order a passage to the room be sealed. Opening the passage, Cupp reveals the incriminating clock. With the murderer in custody, Cupp presents her conclusions to the committee, and tells Nan the case has been solved. (Episode title alludes to The Mystery of the Yellow Room, a 1908 novel by Gaston Leroux.)

== Production ==
=== Development ===
External videos
- Q&A interview with Brower on The Residence: Inside the Private World of the White House, May 10, 2015, C-SPAN

On July 20, 2018, Netflix announced The Residence as a part of a deal between the streamer and Shondaland, with both of them acquiring the rights to adapt the non-fiction book, The Residence: Inside the Private World of the White House, written by Kate Andersen Brower. On March 7, 2022, it was unveiled that The Residence would consist of eight one-hour episodes with Paul William Davies, writer of Scandal and creator of For the People, serving as the executive producer and showrunner of the series as a part of his overall deal with Netflix. Shonda Rhimes and Betsy Beers of Shondaland would also join Davies as executive producers. On February 27, 2023, Liza Johnson was announced as the director for the first four episodes. On July 2, 2025, Netflix canceled the series after one season.

=== Casting ===
On February 1, 2023, Uzo Aduba was announced as the lead character of the series. More cast was revealed on February 27, 2023, with Andre Braugher, Susan Kelechi Watson, Ken Marino, Jason Lee, Bronson Pinchot, Isiah Whitlock Jr., Edwina Findley, Molly Griggs, Al Mitchell, Dan Perrault and Mary Wiseman joining Aduba in supporting roles. On March 7, 2023, Randall Park and Spencer Garrett were revealed to have joined the cast in a main and a recurring role respectively. The next day, four more cast members were announced, consisting of E.L. Losada, Matt Oberg, Ryan Farrell and Alexandra Siegel; Losada was replaced by Taran Killam in the final cut. On March 30, 2023, Barrett Foa joined the main cast in a recurring capacity. Further cast was announced on April 14, 2023, including Kylie Minogue playing herself, Jane Curtin, James Babson, Eliza Coupe, Izzy Diaz, Paul Fitzgerald, Roslyn Gentle, Chris Grace, Juliette Jeffers, Sumalee Montano, Brett Tucker, Nathan Lovejoy, Julieth Restrepo, Mel Rodriguez, and Rebecca Field. Julian McMahon, who plays a fictional Australian prime minister, was the son of real-life former prime minister William McMahon. This was McMahon's final acting role prior to his death on July 2, 2025, the same day Netflix cancelled the series. Al Franken, who plays a senator chairing a committee, served as US senator representing Minnesota from 2009 to 2018.

=== Production design ===
Production design on The Residence was led by François Audouy, with Halina Siwolop as set decorator. The series was filmed on a near full scale set of the White House constructed at Raleigh Studios in Los Angeles.

The set included 132 rooms, built across seven sound stages, spanning 20,800 square feet. It was the largest recreation of the presidential mansion ever. There were some intentional creative liberties taken; the colors were more vibrant compared to those of the actual White House.

The Game Room, where the body is found, was painted charcoal gray to create a sense of darkness. The library was lined with books that closely matched the titles in the real White House library. Considerations were made to design this fictional White House the way the fictional POTUS in the story would have designed it.

=== Filming ===
On July 18, 2022, it was revealed that the series received tax credits from California Film Office worth US$13.95 million. Production of the series was suspended by the 2023 Hollywood labor disputes after four of the eight ordered episodes were filmed. The series was expected to resume production on January 2, 2024. Andre Braugher died on December 11, 2023. In February 2024, it was announced that production had resumed and that Braugher's role had been recast to Giancarlo Esposito. The final episode ends with a dedication to Braugher.

== Release ==
The Residence was released on Netflix on March 20, 2025.

== Reception ==
The review aggregator website Rotten Tomatoes reported an 82% approval rating with an average rating of 6.7/10, based on 39 critic reviews. The website's critics consensus reads, "The Residence situates itself in the White House for a lighthearted murder mystery that won't tax the brain, but Uzo Aduba's eccentric sleuth brings a welcome level of sophistication to proceedings." Metacritic, which uses a weighted average, assigned a score of 66 out of 100 based on 22 critics, indicating favorable reviews.

=== Accolades ===
Accolades received by The Residence
Award	Year	Category	Recipient(s)	Result	Ref.
Visual Effects Society Awards	2026	Outstanding Supporting Visual Effects in a Photoreal Episode	Seth Hill, Tesa Kubicek, John Nelson, Gabriel Vargas (for "The Fall of the House of Usher")	Won	
Visual Effects Society Awards	2026	Outstanding Environment in an Episodic, Commercial, Game Cinematic or Real-Time Project	Gabriel Vargas, Eric Schoellnast, Andrew Wilkins, Omer Gurkan (for "Dial M for Murder; The White House Exterior")	Nominated	
Visual Effects Society Awards	2026	Outstanding Compositing and Lighting in an Episode	Spencer Hecox, Gunnar Heiss, Alexander Greenberg, Eric Schoellnast (for "Pilot")	Nominated	
Primetime Emmy Awards	2025	Outstanding Lead Actress in a Comedy Series	Uzo Aduba	Nominated	
Primetime Emmy Awards	2025	Outstanding Production Design for a Narrative Contemporary Program (One Hour or More)	François Audouy, A. Todd Holland, Halina Siwolop (for "The Fall of the House of Usher")	Nominated	
Primetime Emmy Awards	2025	Outstanding Special Visual Effects	Seth Hill, Tesa Kubicek, John Nelson, Ryan Urban, Phillip Moses, Brandon Nelson, Spencer Hecox, Gabriel Vargas, Burke Roane (for "The Fall of the House of Usher")	Nominated	
Primetime Emmy Awards	2025	Outstanding Original Main Title Theme Music	Mark Mothersbaugh	Nominated	
NAACP Image Awards	2026	Outstanding Comedy Series	The Residence	Nominated	
NAACP Image Awards	2026	Outstanding Actress in a Comedy Series	Uzo Aduba	Nominated	
NAACP Image Awards	2026	Outstanding Supporting Actor in a Comedy Series	Giancarlo Esposito	Nominated	
NAACP Image Awards	2026	Outstanding Supporting Actress in a Comedy Series	Edwina Findley	Nominated	
NAACP Image Awards	2026	Outstanding Performance by a Youth (Series, Special, Television Movie or Limited Series)	Jeremiah Felder	Nominated	
Imagen Awards	2025	Best Supporting Actress – Comedy	Julieth Restrepo	Nominated	
Women's Image Network Awards	2025	Outstanding Actress Made For Television Movie / Limited Series	Uzo Aduba	Nominated	
Black Reel Awards for Television	2025	Outstanding Comedy Series	Paul William Davies	Nominated	
Black Reel Awards for Television	2025	Outstanding Lead Performance in a Comedy Series	Uzo Aduba	Nominated	
Black Reel Awards for Television	2025	Outstanding Supporting Performance in a Comedy Series	Susan Kelechi Watson	Nominated	
