= Big Night =

1996 film by Campbell Scott and Stanley Tucci

- Theatrical release poster
- Directed by: Campbell Scott; Stanley Tucci
- Written by: Joseph Tropiano; Stanley Tucci
- Produced by: David Kirkpatrick; Jonathan Filley
- Starring: Minnie Driver; Ian Holm; Isabella Rossellini; Campbell Scott; Tony Shalhoub; Stanley Tucci
- Cinematography: Ken Kelsch
- Edited by: Suzy Elmiger
- Music by: Gary DeMichele
- Production companies: Rysher Entertainment; Timpano Production
- Distributed by: The Samuel Goldwyn Company
- Release dates: January 24, 1996 (Sundance); September 20, 1996 (United States)
- Running time: 107 minutes
- Country: United States
- Languages: English; Italian
- Budget: $4.1 million
- Box office: $14.2 million

Big Night is a 1996 American comedy-drama film co-directed by Campbell Scott and Stanley Tucci. Set in the 1950s on the Jersey Shore, the film follows two Italian immigrant brothers, played by Tucci and Tony Shalhoub, as they host an evening of free food at their restaurant in an effort to allow it to gain greater exposure. The film's supporting cast includes Minnie Driver, Ian Holm, Isabella Rossellini, and Allison Janney.

Produced by David Kirkpatrick and Jonathan Filley for the Samuel Goldwyn Company, Big Night was met with largely positive reviews and grossed $14 million worldwide. It was nominated for the "Grand Jury Prize" at the Sundance Film Festival and the "Grand Special Prize" at the Deauville Film Festival. Scott and Tucci won the New York Film Critics Circle Award and the Boston Society of Film Critics Award for Best New Director. Tucci and Joseph Tropiano won the Independent Spirit Award for Best First Screenplay.

== Plot ==
On the Jersey Shore in the 1950s, two Italian immigrant brothers from Calabria own and operate a restaurant called Paradise. One brother, Primo, is a brilliant, perfectionist chef who chafes under their few customers' expectations of Americanized Italian food. Their uncle's request that they help run his own, increasingly popular, restaurant back in Rome has a growing appeal for Primo.

The younger brother, Secondo, who is the restaurant manager, is enamored by the possibilities presented by their new endeavor and life in America. Despite Secondo's efforts and Primo's magnificent food, their restaurant is failing to gain success and recognition.

Secondo's struggles as a businessman render him unable to commit to his girlfriend Phyllis, and he has recently been sleeping with Gabriella, the wife of a competitor. Her husband's eponymous restaurant, "Pascal's", has succeeded despite (or perhaps due to) the mediocre, uninspired food served there.

Desperate to keep Paradise afloat, Secondo asks Pascal for a loan. Pascal demurs, repeating a past offer for the brothers to work for him, which Secondo refuses: he and his brother want their own restaurant. In a seemingly generous gesture, Pascal insists that he will persuade popular Italian-American singer Louis Prima to dine at Paradise when in town, assuming the celebrity jazz singer's patronage will revitalize the brothers' business.

Primo and Secondo prepare for the "big night", spending their entire savings on food, drinks, and decoration. They invite numerous people, including a newspaper reporter and Primo's love interest, to join them for a meal showcasing a timpano, which is a complex baked pasta dish.

As they wait for Prima and his entourage to arrive, the dinner party indulges in the exquisite food and partakes in a fabulous celebration. Hours go by, however, and it becomes apparent that the famous singer is not coming, although the reporter, impressed by the food, promises to ask his newspaper to send a food critic to give the restaurant a boost. Phyllis catches Secondo and Gabriella kissing and runs off to the beach. As Gabriella and Pascal leave, she reveals that he never called Louis Prima, thus ending the party.

Secondo follows Phyllis to the beach where they have a final quarrel. Primo and Secondo have a fiery, heart-wrenching argument, chafing at their mutual differences. In the wee hours of the morning, Pascal admits to Secondo that he set the brothers up for failure, not as revenge for Secondo's affair with Gabriella, but because the brothers would have no choice but to work for him. Secondo refuses him, saying they will never work for him.

As dawn breaks, Secondo silently cooks an omelette. When done, he divides it in thirds, giving one portion to their waiter Cristiano, one to himself, and leaving the remainder in the pan. Primo hesitantly enters, and Secondo serves him the last portion. Cristiano leaves, as the brothers begin to eat. They lay their arms across one another's shoulders, and eat silently.

== Cast ==
- Stanley Tucci as Secondo
- Tony Shalhoub as Primo
- Minnie Driver as Phyllis
- Ian Holm as Pascal
- Isabella Rossellini as Gabriella
- Allison Janney as Ann Travis
- Marc Anthony as Cristiano
- Larry Block as Man in restaurant
- Caroline Aaron as Woman in restaurant
- Campbell Scott as Bob
- Susan Floyd as Joan
- Pasquale Cajano as Alberto N. Pisani
- Robert W. Castle as Father O'Brien
- Andre Belgrader as Stash
- Gene Canfield as Charlie
- Liev Schreiber as Leo

== Reception ==
On review aggregator Rotten Tomatoes, the film has an approval rating of 97% based on 56 reviews, with an average rating of 8.1/10. The website's critical consensus reads, "The performances in Big Night are wonderful, and the food looks delicious." On Metacritic, the film has a weighted average score of 80 out of 100, based on 23 critics, indicating "generally favorable" reviews.

During the film's Denver run, Landmark Theatres, KVOD, Cooks Mart and Barolo Grill sponsored a "Big Night at Barolo Grill" sweepstakes tied to screenings at the Esquire Theatre; moviegoers who saw the film during its first three weeks could register at the theater or at participating businesses to win a nine-course, $250 dinner for two at Barolo Grill. The dinner was held on October 30, 1996, and 22 sweepstakes winners were served a nine-course meal prepared by chef David Steinmann, accompanied by Italian wine and grappa.

Peter Travers of Rolling Stone called the movie, "a feast of a film done on a low budget with a menu featuring top-grade acting, writing and direction."

Roger Ebert of the Chicago Sun-Times said of the film, "'Big Night' is one of the great food movies, and yet it is so much more. It is about food not as a subject but as a language--the language by which one can speak to gods, can create, can seduce, can aspire to perfection."

== Awards and nominations ==
Year	Award	Category	Nominated work	Result
1996	Sundance Film Festival	Grand Jury Dramatic Prize	Big Night	Nominated
1996	Sundance Film Festival	Waldo Salt Screenwriting Award	Stanley Tucci & Joseph Tropiano	Won
1996	Independent Spirit Awards	Best First Feature	Big Night	Nominated
1996	Independent Spirit Awards	Best First Screenplay	Stanley Tucci & Joseph Tropiano	Won
1996	Independent Spirit Awards	Best Male Lead	Stanley Tucci	Nominated
1996	Independent Spirit Awards	Best Male Lead	Tony Shalhoub	Nominated
1996	National Board of Review	Special Recognition	Big Night	Won
1996	National Society of Film Critics	Best Supporting Actor	Tony Shalhoub	Won
1996	National Society of Film Critics	Best Screenplay	Stanley Tucci & Joseph Tropiano	Nominated
1996	New York Film Critics Circle	Best New Director	Campbell Scott and Stanley Tucci	Won
1996	New York Film Critics Circle	Best Supporting Actor	Tony Shalhoub	Nominated
1996	Los Angeles Film Critics Association	Best Screenplay	Stanley Tucci & Joseph Tropiano	Nominated
