= City of Fear =

City of Fear may refer to:

- City of Fear (1959 film), an American film directed by Irving Lerner
- City of Fear (1965 film), a film directed by Peter Bezencenet
- City of Fear, a 2000 film with Gary Daniels and Carol Campbell
- City of Fear, a 2016 episode of Homicide Hunter: Lt. Joe Kenda
- "City of Fear", a 1994 episode of Frontline
- La Cité de la peur, translated as The City of Fear, a 1994 French comedy
- City of Fear (album), a 1980 album by FM

== See also ==
- Fear City (disambiguation)
