= Molly Griggs =

American actress

- Education: Carnegie Mellon University (BFA)
- Occupation: Actress
- Years active: 2018–present
- Television: Servant

Molly Griggs is an American stage and television actress.

== Early and personal life ==
The daughter of Ken and Lindsay Griggs, she has a brother, Austin, and a sister, Laura. Originally from Washington DC, they moved to North Carolina when Molly was six years old. Griggs and her family were involved in the Cape Fear Regional Theatre, which fostered her interest in acting. She attended Terry Sanford High School in Fayetteville, North Carolina and Carnegie Mellon University in Pittsburgh, graduating with a bachelor's degree in fine arts for acting.

== Career ==
=== Theatre ===
She appeared in the off-Broadway production of Linda opposite Janie Dee prior to making her Broadway debut as Minnie Fay in a 2018 revival of Hello, Dolly! alongside Bernadette Peters. In 2025, she appeared in the Broadway play John Proctor Is the Villain at the Booth Theatre alongside Sadie Sink and Gabriel Ebert.

=== Television ===
She appeared in the series pilot of HBO drama series Succession alongside Kieran Culkin.

In 2020, she was cast in Peacock true crime drama anthology series Dr. Death as Wendy Young, the girlfriend of Dr. Christopher Duntsch. That year, she also appeared in the series Prodigal Son. In 2021, she could be seen playing Isabelle Carrick in M. Night Shyamalan series Servant.

She appeared as Dr. Max Goodwin’s (Ryan Eggold) daughter, Luna Goodwin, in NBC medical drama New Amsterdam. In 2024, a spin-off series for her character was mooted with the involvement of series creator, executive producer and showrunner David Schulner.

In 2023, she was cast as Lilly Schumacher, President Morgan’s Social Secretary, in Shondaland mystery series The Residence.

In 2026, Griggs was cast as twin sisters Naomi and Tina Witt in Amazon MGM Studios television series Things We Never Got Over.

== Partial filmography ==
Year	Title	Role	Notes
2018	Succession	Grace	3 episodes
2019–2020	Prodigal Son	Eve Blanchard	8 episodes
2020–2022	Servant	Isabelle Carrick	11 episodes
2021	Dr. Death	Wendy Young	6 episodes
2021	Before I Go	Angry woman in car	
2022	New Amsterdam	Dr. Luna Goodwin	1 episode
2023	FBI: Most Wanted	Mavis Kennedy	1 episode
2023	The Good Doctor	Harper	1 episode
2025	The Residence	Lilly Schumacher	8 episodes
2026	CIA	AUSA Lauren Lafferty	1 episodes
