= Megan Stott =

American actress

Megan Stott is an American actress. She had her breakthrough role in Little Fires Everywhere (2020) and had the lead role in 2024 series Penelope.

== Early life ==
From Fayetteville, Arkansas, she began acting at a young age, putting plays on with her brothers at home. She was encouraged to sign up with acting agencies by her vocal coach. She attended an online public school.

== Career ==
She had her first television role in 2020 playing Izzy, the daughter of Reese Witherspoon’s character in the adaptation of Celeste Ng's Little Fires Everywhere. In April 2020, she joined the cast of the family comedy film Yes Day alongside Jennifer Garner and Jenna Ortega. In 2021, she appeared in comedy horror anthology series Just Beyond.

In 2024, she had the lead role of Penelope in Netflix coming-of-age television series Penelope written by Mark Duplass and Mel Eslyn. That year, she had a lead role in action thriller film Aftermath alongside Dylan Sprouse and Mason Gooding.

In 2026, Stott was cast as Waylay in Amazon MGM Studios television series Things We Never Got Over.

== Personal life ==
She plays the violin.

== Filmography ==
Year	Title	Role	Notes
2020	Little Fires Everywhere	Izzy Richardson	7 episodes
2021	Yes Day	Layla	Feature
2021	Just Beyond	Olivia	1 episode
2024	Penelope	Penelope	Title role
2024	Aftermath	Madeleine Daniels	Feature
