= Before I Go (film) =

- Directed by: Eric Schaeffer
- Written by: Eric Schaeffer
- Starring: Annabella Sciorra; Robert Klein; Willie Garson
- Release date: July 20, 2021
- Running time: 98 minutes
- Country: United States
- Language: English

Before I Go is a 2021 American comedy-drama film written and directed by Eric Schaeffer and starring Annabella Sciorra, Robert Klein and Willie Garson in his final film role.

Samantha Miller, a washed up one-hit wonder angry with her life, goes on a poignant and hilarious quest through New York City seeking a reason to live.

== Cast ==
- Annabella Sciorra as Samantha
- Robert Klein as Jasper
- Willie Garson as Francis (final film role)
- Craig Bierko as Walt
- Andrea Navedo
- Molly Griggs as Angry Car Woman

== Release ==
The film was released on VOD on July 20, 2021.

== Reception ==
Sabina Dana Plasse of Film Threat rated the film a 7 out of 10.

Rachel West of the Alliance of Women Film Journalists gave the film a positive review and wrote, "So rarely do we get a glimpse of a middle-aged female character as multifaceted as Samantha, it’s refreshing to see her brought to life by Sciorra."
