= Penelope (TV series) =

American television series

- Created by: Mark Duplass & Mel Eslyn
- Showrunner: Mel Eslyn
- Written by: Mark Duplass & Mel Eslyn
- Directed by: Mel Eslyn
- Starring: Megan Stott
- Music by: Danny Bensi; Saunder Jurriaans; Julia Piker
- Country of origin: United States
- Original language: English
- No. of series: 1
- No. of episodes: 8

Production
- Executive producers: Mark Duplass; Jay Duplass; Mel Eslyn; Shuli Harel
- Producer: Meghan Mowery
- Cinematography: Nathan M. Miller
- Editor: Celia Beasley
- Running time: 20–28 minutes
- Production company: Duplass Brothers Productions

Original release
- Network: Netflix
- Release: September 24, 2024

Penelope is a 2024 coming-of-age television series from Mark Duplass and Mel Eslyn, and starring Megan Stott. It premiered on Netflix in the United States on September 24, 2024.

== Plot ==
A sixteen-year-old girl leaves her home and journeys into the wilderness area for unknown reasons.

== Cast ==
=== Main ===
- Megan Stott as Penelope

=== Recurring ===
- Cynthia Geary as Penelope's Mom
- Austin Abrams as Sam
- Krisha Fairchild as Helena
- Rhenzy Feliz as Peter

In addition, Barry O'Neil co-stars as Penelope's dad.

== Production ==
The series was co-created by Mark Duplass and Mel Eslyn, who acts as showrunner. It is produced by Duplass Brothers Productions with Duplass and Shuli Harel as executive producers. The cast is led by Megan Stott, with Austin Abrams and Krisha Fairchild. Eslyn also directs.

The rights to the eight-episode series in the United States were obtained by Netflix in May 2024.

== Episodes ==
No.	Title	Directed by	Written by	Original release date
1	"One"	Mel Eslyn	Mark Duplass & Mel Eslyn	September 24, 2024
2	"Two"	Mel Eslyn	Mark Duplass & Mel Eslyn	September 24, 2024
3	"Three"	Mel Eslyn	Mark Duplass & Mel Eslyn	September 24, 2024
4	"Four"	Mel Eslyn	Mark Duplass & Mel Eslyn	September 24, 2024
5	"Five"	Mel Eslyn	Mark Duplass & Mel Eslyn	September 24, 2024
6	"Six"	Mel Eslyn	Mark Duplass & Mel Eslyn	September 24, 2024
7	"Seven"	Mel Eslyn	Mark Duplass & Mel Eslyn	September 24, 2024
8	"Eight"	Mel Eslyn	Mark Duplass & Mel Eslyn	September 24, 2024

== Broadcast ==
The series was available to stream on Netflix in the United States from September 24, 2024.

== Reception ==
On the review aggregator website Rotten Tomatoes, 87% of 15 critics' reviews are positive, with an average rating of 7.4/10. The website's consensus reads: "A gorgeously shot wish-fulfillment fantasy for anyone who has ever wanted respite from modernity, Penelope is a distinctive and refreshing addition to the YA genre." Metacritic, which uses a weighted average, assigned the series a score of 79 out of 100, based on 9 critics, indicating "generally favorable" reviews.
