= The Addiction =

1995 American horror film directed by Abel Ferrara

- Theatrical release poster
- Directed by: Abel Ferrara
- Written by: Nicholas St. John
- Produced by: Denis Hann; Fernando Sulichin
- Starring: Lili Taylor; Christopher Walken; Annabella Sciorra; Edie Falco; Paul Calderón; Fredro Starr; Kathryn Erbe; Michael Imperioli
- Cinematography: Ken Kelsch
- Edited by: Mayin Lo
- Music by: Joe Delia
- Distributed by: October Films
- Release dates: January 21, 1995 (Sundance); October 6, 1995 (United States)
- Running time: 82 minutes
- Country: United States
- Language: English
- Box office: $302,393

The Addiction is a 1995 American vampire horror film directed by Abel Ferrara, written by Nicholas St. John, and starring Lili Taylor, Christopher Walken, Annabella Sciorra, Edie Falco, Paul Calderón, Fredro Starr, Kathryn Erbe, and Michael Imperioli. The film follows a philosophy doctoral student who is turned into a vampire after being bitten by a woman during a chance encounter on the streets of New York City. After the attack, she struggles to come to terms with her new life and begins developing an addiction to human blood. The film was shot in black-and-white and has been considered an allegory about drug addiction and the theological concept of sin.

The Addiction premiered at the Sundance Film Festival on January 21, 1995, and was screened at the 45th Berlin International Film Festival on February 18, 1995, where it was nominated for the Golden Bear. The film was theatrically released in the United States on October 6, 1995. Despite underperforming commercially, the film received positive reviews, with Taylor's performance earning critical praise. At the 11th Independent Spirit Awards, Ferrara was nominated for Best Feature and Taylor was nominated for Best Female Lead.

== Plot ==
Kathleen Conklin, an introverted doctoral student of philosophy at New York University, is attacked one night by a woman who calls herself "Casanova". She pushes Kathleen into a dark subterranean area, bites her neck, and drinks her blood. Kathleen soon develops symptoms of vampirism such as aversion to daylight and distaste for food. Fearing she may have contracted HIV, she undergoes medical tests which show only anemia. She grows aggressive in demeanor and propositions her dissertation advisor for sex at her apartment, stealing money from his wallet after he falls asleep. Jean, a doctoral candidate in Kathleen's cohort, notices a drastic change in Kathleen's personality.

During finals week in the library, Kathleen meets a female anthropology student. They go to the woman's apartment to study, where Kathleen bites her neck. While the young woman weeps incredulously, Kathleen coldly informs her "My indifference is not the concern here, it's your astonishment that needs studying". Later, Kathleen runs into a local man who goes by the street name "Black", at a deli. She propositions him for sex and leads him away, then attacks him on an empty street and drinks his blood. Later on campus, Kathleen confronts Jean, rambling about the nature of guilt, before proceeding to bite her neck and drink her blood.

While walking on the street, Kathleen meets Peina, a vampire who claims to have almost conquered his addiction and as a result is almost human. For a time, he keeps her in his home, lecturing her about overcoming her vampiric impulses and recommending that she read William S. Burroughs' Naked Lunch, but brutally feeding off her in contrast to his words, leaving her bloody and staggering down the street.

Kathleen rallies, returns to study, and completes and defends her dissertation to a committee, earning her Doctorate of Philosophy. She throws a party to celebrate and invites the department as well as all of her victims. She and Jean first feast on the blood of a waitress in a storage closet at the party before they, Casanova, and the other victims proceed to attack the academic attendees in a bloody, chaotic orgy.

Kathleen, having overdosed from the bloody bacchanal and appearing wracked with regret, wanders the streets covered in blood. She ends up in a hospital and asks the nurse to let her die, but the nurse refuses. Kathleen decides to commit suicide by asking the nurse to open the curtains. After the nurse leaves, Casanova appears in Kathleen's hospital room, shuts the curtains and quotes R. C. Sproul to her. A Catholic priest visits Kathleen's room and agrees to administer Viaticum. In the final scene, Kathleen visits her own grave in broad daylight. In a voice-over, Kathleen quotes the phrase "self-revelation is annihilation of self".

== Cast ==
- Lili Taylor as Kathleen Conklin
- Christopher Walken as Peina
- Annabella Sciorra as Casanova
- Edie Falco as Jean
- Paul Calderon as Professor
- Fredro Starr as Black
- Kathryn Erbe as Anthropology Student
- Michael Imperioli as Missionary
- Jamel Simmons as Black's Friend
- Robert W. Castle as Narrator / Priest

== Production ==
=== Development and casting ===
According to Abel Ferrara, the characters of Peina and Casanova were originally written as a female and male respectively. When Christopher Walken read the script, he thought Peina was a male character and wanted to play the role. As a result, Walken was cast as Peina whereas Casanova was played by Annabella Sciorra.

=== Filming ===
Principal photography began in New York City on August 23, 1994, and concluded on September 14. The film was shot on location in Greenwich Village and on the New York University campus. The sequences inside Peina's home were shot in a loft owned by Julian Schnabel, who allowed Ferrara to film there. Lili Taylor recalled meeting with Ferrara and rehearsing scenes at his apartment during evenings leading up to the shoot. Taylor and co-star Michael Imperioli, whom she was dating at the time, would walk the streets in Manhattan late at night, which Taylor stated helped her get into the mindset of the character.

== Release ==
The Addiction premiered in New York City on October 4, 1995, and opened in Los Angeles two days later, on October 6, 1995. It was distributed in North American markets by October Films, who one month earlier released Nadja, a vampire film also shot in black-and-white and set in New York City.

=== Home media ===
The Addiction remained unreleased on DVD in North America throughout the 2000s, though a VHS was released in 1998 by USA Films. In March 2018, Arrow Films announced an upcoming Blu-ray release of the film available in North America and the United Kingdom, which was released on June 26, 2018. The Arrow Blu-ray features a new 4K restoration of the film, and contains contemporary interviews with Taylor, Walken, Ferrara, and composer Joe Delia, as well as an audio commentary with Ferrara, among other features. Arrow issued a 4K UHD Blu-ray edition on December 10, 2024.

== Reception ==
=== Box office ===
The Addiction grossed a total of $46,448 during its opening weekend, playing in seven cinemas in the United States, averaging $6,635 per theater. It expanded to a total of 14 theaters before closing on January 11, 1996, concluding its theatrical run with a domestic gross of $307,308.

=== Critical response ===
As of November 2025, the film holds a rating of 75% on Rotten Tomatoes based on 32 reviews. The website's critical consensus reads: "Abel Ferrara's 1995 horror/suspense experiment blends urban vampire adventure with philosophical analysis to create a smart, idiosyncratic and undeniably odd take on the genre".

Kevin Thomas of the Los Angeles Times praised Taylor's performance, and added: "Although Ferrara dares to be intellectual in a manner virtually unique in commercial American cinema, he nevertheless doesn't forget how to entertain in the gory, bravura manner associated with him. Although it undeniably helps, you don't have to know your Heidegger from Hamburger Helper to enjoy The Addiction as a grisly yet unusual thriller of the supernatural." The Washington Post's Hal Hinson was less laudatory of Taylor's performance, writing that she "seems less distinctive here than she has been in past roles." However, he praised Walken's performance, though summarized the film as "serious and passionate; [Ferrara's] conviction, too, is unquestionable. However, when he flashes images of historic atrocities of both the distant and recent past—Nazi death camps, the war dead in Bosnia—his ideas come across as shallow and banal. Also, inserting scenes of real-life horror into what is essentially a glorified genre exercise may strike some as the essence of bad taste." Caryn James of The New York Times expressed a similar sentiment, noting "When the film connects Kathleen's struggle to resist evil to My Lai and the Holocaust, those comparisons are exploitative in a way that even a genre-bending film can't get away with." Jay Carr of The Boston Globe had a similar assessment, writing: "Ferrara can't muster enough dramatic follow-through to justify his borrowing of My Lai and Holocaust images. It's more a half-baked rumination on the significance of vampirism than an actual dramatization."

Stephen Hunter of The Baltimore Sun praised Taylor for portraying Kathleen "with dour, sexless intensity," and deemed the film "far sexier than Interview with the Vampire and far deadlier than the campy Nadja... It's extremely disturbing, a graduate- level movie for advanced students in any of three subjects: cinema, philosophy and debauchery." Melanie McFarland of The Oregonian praised Taylor's performance as "superb" while noting that the film's drug addiction theme is "so overpowering" that it "begins to run the risk of being simply misinterpreted as an alternative anti-drug tale... [it] does [however] give an interesting view into the darkness of the human soul."

The film received high praise from critic Peter Bradshaw, who named it as one of his top ten favorite films in a 2002 Sight and Sound poll.

=== Accolades ===
Institution	Year	Category	Recipient	Result	Ref.
Berlin International Film Festival	1995	Golden Bear	The Addiction	Nominated	
Fancine Film Festival	1995	Best Actress	Lili Taylor	Won	
Fancine Film Festival	1995	Special Mention Award	Christopher Walken	Won	
Fancine Film Festival	1995	Best Film	Abel Ferrara	Won	
Independent Spirit Awards	1996	Best Feature	The Addiction	Nominated	
Independent Spirit Awards	1996	Best Female Lead	Lili Taylor	Nominated	
Mystfest	1995	Best Film	The Addiction	Nominated	
Sant Jordi Awards	1995	Best Foreign Actress	Lili Taylor	Nominated	

== Themes ==
Scholar David Carter interprets The Addiction as a reimagining of the vampire film, in which the vampire's victims submit to being bitten and thus take on bloodlust for themselves:

Historically within fiction, while vampires so often represent sexual desire, the baggage that came with that desire was being a slave to it. Vampires need and lust for blood at base primal level. Within The Addiction it's taken even further. Vampires are themselves the addicted and the addiction, foisting themselves alluringly upon people who want to dabble in something dangerous and all consuming. The words Casanova speaks to Kathleen ("Look at me and tell me to go away. Don't ask, tell me") become a refrain in the film, the idea being that the prey want to become addicted even when they know the risks.

The scholar, Tom Pollard, interprets the film as a metaphor for drug addiction, which Ferrara has called the theme of the film. "This plot relies on human willpower to control addiction... Eventually [Kathleen] achieves the necessary willpower and seemingly triumphs over death after she's reborn as a human". In addition to the thematic parallel to drug addiction noted by several critics and scholars, Slant Magazine's Ed Gonzalez considers the film "perhaps the most fabulously serpentine political work of Ferrara's career, a quivering nexus of AIDS allegory, identity crisis, historical unease, and socio-economic panic". The film scholars, Yoram Allon, Del Cullen and Hannah Patterson, note the film's preoccupation with religion, salvation and self-destruction, which are recurrent in Ferrara's films and add that it "perfectly illustrates Ferrara's obsession with the collapse of moral order".

Ferrara had struggled with an addiction to heroin for many years, and conceptualized the film as a Catholic redemption tale in which Kathleen, stricken by her lust for blood, accepts her powerlessness and submits to God before being reborn at the film's conclusion.

The film critic Stephen Hunter interprets the film as a commentary on the world of academia, pointing out Kathleen's transformative disillusion with philosophy as a means of understanding the nature of good versus evil, "She's got a grudge against philosophy, which, in the long run, with all its constructs and rationalizations and insights, has proved somewhat inefficient as salvation".

== Sources ==
- Allon, Yoram; Cullen, Del; Patterson, Hannah, eds. (2000). The Wallflower Critical Guide to Contemporary North American Directors. London: Wallflower Press. ISBN 978-1-903-36410-9.
- Pollard, Tom (2016). Loving Vampires: Our Undead Obsession. Jefferson, North Carolina: McFarland. ISBN 978-0-786-49778-2.
