= Kate Andersen Brower =

American journalist and author

- Education: Barnard College (BA); University of Oxford (MA)
- Occupations: Journalist; author

Kate Andersen Brower is an American journalist and author who has written four books about the White House, two of which have been New York Times bestsellers, The Residence: Inside the Private World of the White House, First Women: The Grace & Power of America's Modern First Ladies, First in Line: Presidents, Vice presidents, and the Pursuit of Power, and Team of Five: The presidents Club in the Age of Trump. She covered the White House for Bloomberg News during President Barack Obama's first term and before that she worked at CBS News and Fox News as a producer. She is also a CNN contributor and has written for The New York Times, Vanity Fair, The Washington Post, and The Smithsonian.

== Education ==
She is a graduate of Barnard College and holds a master from Oxford University.

== Writings ==
Brower's book The Residence: Inside the Private World of the White House has been called a "groundbreaking" backstairs look at the maids and butlers and other professionals who work at the White House. The book hit no. 1 on the nonfiction New York Times Best Seller list. Netflix optioned the TV rights to the book, with Shonda Rhimes producing. The Netflix murder mystery series The Residence credits the book and Ms Brower as an inspiration.

Her second nonfiction book, First Women: The Grace & Power of America's Modern First Ladies, examined the lives of the First Ladies of the United States. The book was called a "gossipy, but surprisingly deep, look at the women who help and sometimes overshadow their powerful husbands."

Her third nonfiction book, First in Line, covers every vice president of the modern era, from Richard Nixon to Joe Biden and Mike Pence.

Brower's fourth nonfiction book, Team of Five: The presidents Club in the Age of Trump, examines what has been characterized as the world's most exclusive club, membership limited to the former presidents of the United States. Brower looks at the relationships between the former American presidents as well as the strains between this rarified group and the (at that time) current occupant of the Oval Office, Donald Trump.

Brower authored Elizabeth Taylor: The Grit and Glamour of an Icon, the first authorized biography of actress and activist Elizabeth Taylor, in 2022.

== Bibliography ==
- The Residence: Inside the Private World of the White House (2015) ISBN 978-0062305206
- First Women: The Grace & Power of America's Modern First Ladies (2017) ISBN 978-0062439666
- First in Line: Presidents, Vice presidents, and the Pursuit of Power (2018) ISBN 978-0062668950
- Team of Five: The Presidents Club in the Age of Trump (2020) ISBN 978-0062668974
- Elizabeth Taylor: The Grit and Glamour of an Icon (2022) ISBN 978-0063067653
