= The Funeral (1996 film) =

1996 film by Abel Ferrara

- Theatrical release poster
- Directed by: Abel Ferrara
- Written by: Nicholas St. John
- Produced by: Mary Kane
- Starring: Christopher Walken; Benicio del Toro; Vincent Gallo; Paul Hipp; Chris Penn; Isabella Rossellini; Annabella Sciorra
- Cinematography: Ken Kelsch
- Edited by: Mayin Lo; Bill Pankow
- Music by: Joe Delia
- Production company: C&P Productions; MDP Worldwide
- Distributed by: October Films
- Release dates: September 3, 1996 (Venice); November 1, 1996 (U.S.)
- Running time: 99 min.
- Country: United States
- Language: English
- Budget: $12.5 million
- Box office: $1.4 million (worldwide)

The Funeral is a 1996 American crime drama film directed by Abel Ferrara from a screenplay by Nicholas St. John, and starring Christopher Walken, Chris Penn, Annabella Sciorra, Isabella Rossellini, Vincent Gallo, Benicio del Toro and Gretchen Mol. The story concerns the funeral of one of three brothers in a family of gangsters that lived in New York City in the 1930s. It details, through a series of flashbacks, the past of the brothers and their families.

The film premiered at the 53rd Venice International Film Festival, where Chris Penn won the Volpi Cup for Best Supporting Actor. It was released in the United States on November 1, 1996 and received positive reviews. At the 12th Independent Spirit Awards, it was nominated in five categories including Best Film, Best Director, and Best Actor (for Walken).

== Plot ==
The film begins with the funeral of one of the three Tempio brothers, a set of violent criminals. Mourning the passage of their beloved brother Johnny are Chez and Ray. Ray is cold and calculating, while Chez is hot tempered. Flashbacks demonstrate Johnny to be more sensitive. Exposure to communist meetings as a spy sways Johnny's opinions. The chief suspect in Johnny's murder is rival gangster Gaspare Spoglia.

Ray and Chez swear revenge. Ray's wife, Jeanette, opposes the campaign of retribution and the violence it will bring, while Chez's wife, Clara, struggles to deal with her husband's obsessive nature.

Ray has Gaspare abducted for interrogation and they go to see Johnny's body. He is satisfied by Gaspare's claim of innocence, in part because he says that gangsters are superstitious, believing that the wounds of the corpse will start bleeding in the presence of the killer. Therefore the killer will not willingly enter the dead victim's presence. Gaspare is comfortable to be in the presence of the victim, so is not the killer. Ray releases Gaspare but instructs his men to murder him later.

As it turns out, Johnny was not murdered by rival gangsters, but by a man who claimed Johnny had raped his girlfriend. Ray's men identify him by tracking the car he had driven to commit the crime. Pressed by Ray, the killer confesses that he had wanted revenge because Johnny beat him in front of his friends and girlfriend. Ray kills him.

As he buries the dead murderer, Chez reflects on his brothers' lives before the tragedy. He then returns to Ray's house and shoots and kills Ray and his two bodyguards. Chez then shoots Johnny, lying dead in the casket, before putting the gun in his own mouth and committing suicide as the family women wail over Ray's dying body.

== Cast ==
- Christopher Walken as Raimondo "Ray" Tempio
  - Paul Perri as young Ray
- Chris Penn as Cesarino "Chez" Tempio
  - Gregory Perrelli as young Chez
  - Joey Hannon as middle Chez
- Annabella Sciorra as Jean
- Isabella Rossellini as Clara Tempio
- Vincent Gallo as Giovanni "Johnny" Tempio
- Benicio del Toro as Gaspare Spoglia
- Gretchen Mol as Helen
- John Ventimiglia as Sali
- Paul Hipp as Ghouly
- Victor Argo as Julius
- David Patrick Kelly as Michael Stein
- Frank John Hughes as Bacco
- Robert Miano as Enrico
- Gian DiDonna as Ray Sr.
- Dmitri Prachenko as Sentieri
- Nicholas De Cegli as Victor
- Amber Smith as Bridgette
- Carrie Szlasa as Fox
- Phil Neilson as Billy
- Chuck Zito as Zito
- Edie Falco as Union speaker
- Joseph R. Gannascoli as Rocco
- Robert W. Castle as Priest
- Patrick McGaw as the Mechanic
- Andrew Fiscella as Murder witness

== Production ==
The role of Ray was originally offered to Nicolas Cage.

Vincent Gallo claimed that Ferrara was "high on crack" while directing this film. During filming, Gallo got onto a physical altercation with actor John Ventimiglia. Gallo later sued Ventimiglia for assault, and the case was decided in his favor in 2001.

== Reception ==
Reception from critics was positive, as The Funeral holds a 79% approval rating on Rotten Tomatoes based on 34 reviews. The site's critics consensus reads, "Abel Ferrara reunites with Christopher Walken to forge another haunting gangster saga, delivering a bruising exploration of vengeance."

Roger Ebert gave The Funeral three stars out of four, praising the acting especially. Janet Maslin of New York Times also gave a positive review, calling it "hotblooded" and "well-acted". In Entertainment Weekly, Ken Tucker described the film as "fine, thoughtful, and jolting". David Parkinson of Empire gave the film four stars out of five, praising the "complex characters" and "impressive cast".

In 2009, Empire ranked the film at #16 on its list of "20 Greatest Gangster Movies You've Never Seen (Probably)".
