= 9 Lives of a Wet Pussy =

- Theatrical release poster
- Directed by: Abel Ferrara
- Written by: Nicholas George
- Starring: Pauline LaMonde; Dominique Santos
- Cinematography: Francis X. Wolfe
- Edited by: K. James Lovttit
- Music by: Joe Delia
- Production company: Navaron Films
- Distributed by: Navaron Films
- Release date: 1976
- Running time: 70 minutes
- Country: United States
- Language: English

9 Lives of a Wet Pussy is a 1976 American pornographic film directed by Abel Ferrara (under the pseudonym Jimmy Boy L.) in his feature directorial debut. Written by Nicholas St. John under the pseudonym Nicholas George, the film stars Pauline LaMonde as Pauline, a socialite who details her sexual experiences by mail to a mystic named Gypsy, played by Dominique Santos.

== Cast ==
- Pauline LaMonde as Pauline
- Dominique Santos as Gypsy
- Joy Silver as Nacala
- David Pirell as Husband
- Shaker Lewis as Stable Boy
- Nicholas St. John as Chauffeur
- Tony Richards as Attendant
- Peggy Johnson as Younger Sister
- Abel Ferrera as Old Man

== Production ==
During its production, 9 Lives of a Wet Pussy was known by the working title White Women. The film's opening credits claim that the film is "based on the novel Les Femmes Blanches by Francois DuLea", a non-existent book by a non-existent author. The name "Francois DuLea" is a reference to Francis Delia, the film's director of photography (who is credited in the film under the pseudonym Francis X. Wolfe). Although distributors eventually insisted on a more provocative title, director Abel Ferrera reportedly wanted the film to be called Nothing Sacred.

In a 2019 interview with Filmmaker, Ferrara responded to a question related to movie theatre projectionists cutting out hardcore scenes from pornographic films:

They did this to me. 9 Lives [of a Wet Pussy] was this porno film. We shot some cool scenes in that. But when the print traveled around, especially that circuit, you know, once it got south of Philly, the projectionist would just naturally take the best scene out and put it on his reel. We had a beautiful movie and by the time it came out — it was borderline to begin with — now it really sucked. The version now had none of the good scenes. They were all the scenes the projectionist didn't want. He was the final editor.

== Home media ==
In 2019, the film was restored in 2K from its original 35 mm camera negative and released on Blu-ray and DVD by Vinegar Syndrome.

== Reception ==
According to a review at the time of the home media release in 2019, "the seeds of Ferrara’s obsessions are already on display even in this very incoherent porno."
