= Nicholas St. John (screenwriter) =

American screenwriter

- Born: Nicodemo Oliverio; Westchester County, New York, U.S.
- Other names: Nicholas George; N.G. St. John
- Occupation: Screenwriter
- Years active: 1971-2005

Nicodemo Oliverio, known by the pen name Nicholas St. John, is a retired American screenwriter. He is known for his frequent collaborations with director Abel Ferrara. He was nominated for an Independent Spirit Award for Best Screenplay for his work on The Funeral (1996).

== Early life and education ==
Born Nicodemo Oliverio, St. John attended Lakeland High School. It was at high school where he met and befriended Ferrara. Both he and Ferrara attended and graduated from New York University.

== Career ==
St. John wrote and acted in Ferrara's early shorts Nicky's Film and The Hold Up, credited by his real name. Under the pseudonym Nicholas George, he wrote the screenplay for and played a supporting role in Ferrara's 1976 pornographic film, 9 Lives of a Wet Pussy.

He went on to write the screenplay of Ferrara's mainstream directorial debut, The Driller Killer (1979). Subsequently, he wrote or co-wrote the scripts for eight of Ferrara's theatrical films between 1981 and 1996, including for Ms. 45 (1981), Fear City (1984), and King of New York (1990).

A notable Ferrara film in which St. John did not write the screenplay was Bad Lieutenant (1992). A Catholic, St. John refused to work with Ferrara on that particular film because of its blasphemous images. St. John also tried to dissuade Ferrara and Harvey Keitel, who played the titular role, from even making it. Despite this, St. John wrote the scripts of Ferrara's subsequent films Body Snatchers and Dangerous Game, both released in 1993. The last two films that St. John has written to date are Ferrara's The Addiction (1995) and The Funeral (1996).

Ferrara said of St. John in 2015, "We started making films when we were 16, and then at a certain point he just had enough, you dig? He didn't dig the business, he didn't dig the spirituality of the business, didn't dig the lifestyle; and at the height of his game, of our game, he just said: enough." It has been said that St. John and Ferrara's longtime collaboration ended as a result of a falling-out.

In 2005, it was reported that St. John co-wrote a script with Danish filmmaker Nicolas Winding Refn titled Billy's People. However, the script was never made into a film due to poor commercial reception of Refn's films Bleeder (1999) and Fear X (2003). As of 2026, The Funeral remains St. John's last produced screenplay.

St. John is a rarity in that all of his produced scripts have been by for a single director.

== Personal life ==
St. John is known for being private about his personal life and his reticence to give interviews. A 2019 article in Filmmaker noted "To this day Nicholas St. John gives no interviews on his career," calling him "overbearingly silent."

== Filmography ==
- 9 Lives of a Wet Pussy (1976)
- The Driller Killer (1979)
- Ms. 45 (1981)
- Fear City (1984)
- China Girl (1987)
- King of New York (1990)
- Dangerous Game (1993)
- Body Snatchers (1993)
- The Addiction (1995)
- The Funeral (1996)
