= Fear City pamphlets =

Pamphlets distributed by the New York Police Department

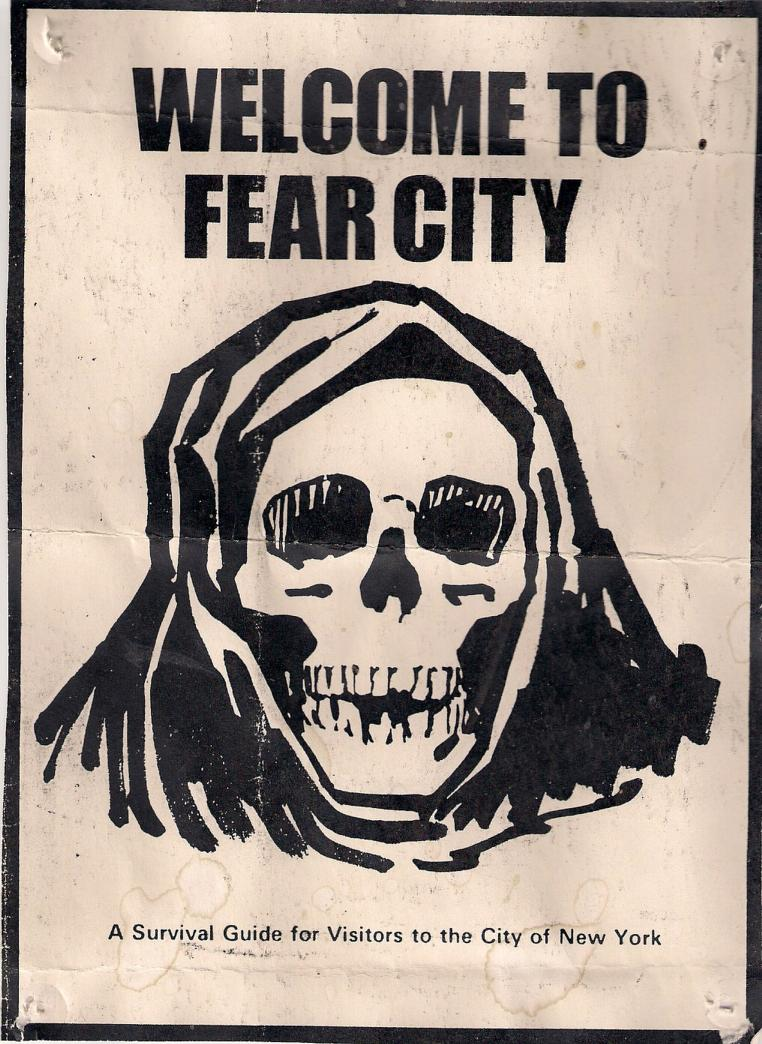
Cover of the Fear City pamphlet

The Fear City pamphlets were distributed in New York City during June 1975 in a propaganda campaign by the city's police and other uniformed services. The pamphlets were subtitled "A Survival Guide for Visitors to the City of New York" and had a picture of a hooded skull on the cover. They warned of high rates of violent crime in the city and contained nine guidelines for "survival".

The pamphlets were created during New York City's 1975 fiscal crisis whereupon municipal budget cuts were announced in May 1975 that threatened over 50,000 city jobs and reduced salaries and pensions as the city drew near to bankruptcy. Police unions responded to the budget cuts by printing at least one million Fear City pamphlets with plans to distribute them at airports, hotels, and bus terminals.

Close copies of the fliers were also distributed by police at Yale University in August 2023 at a time when they were renegotiating their contracts.

== Events ==
The Fear City pamphlets were created by Ken McFeeley, President of the Patrolmen's Benevolent Association and cochairman of the Council for Public Safety in response to New York City Mayor Abe Beame's announcement of layoffs of public employees, including police officers and firefighters. The layoffs were part of a new austerity budget introduced by the city in response to its financial crisis, and called for the first round of nearly 11,000 officers to be dismissed at the beginning of the fiscal year, set to begin on July 1, 1975.

Beginning on the morning of Friday, June 13, 1975, McFeeley and several other leaders of the uniformed‐personnel unions began distributing the pamphlets from a fenced‐off area outside the International Arrivals Building at John F. Kennedy International Airport, intending to give the leaflets to incoming passengers on overseas flights. As none were scheduled to arrive until early afternoon, the distribution was limited to only a handful of pamphlets, and of those, most went to "airport employees and newsmen".

Later that day during a rally at City Hall, McFeeley said "the public is aware of the danger that massive layoffs of firemen and policemen will create. We have to alert everyone coming into New York to put pressure on them to cancel these insane layoffs."

Mayor Beame and the city filed for a restraining order against police distributing the pamphlets, saying the pamphlet distribution violated public trust and was a "new low in irresponsibility." The city's restraining order was quickly overturned when Justice Frederick E. Hammer ruled that the pamphlets were a protected form of free speech. A separate restraining order filed by the New York City Transit Authority, which argued grounds "quite different from those of the city's order", was left in place, and barred city employees from distributing the pamphlets on Transit Authority properties such as subways and bus stations.

By June 20, 1975, the Patrolmen's Benevolent Association decided to change tactics and no longer distribute the pamphlets, choosing to instead deploy sound trucks into the Bronx and Queens neighborhoods urging the public to bring pressure on Beame to rescind the cutbacks.

Despite these efforts the Association was ultimately unable to prevent layoffs of approximately 5,000 police officers when the next fiscal year began 10 days later, on July 1, 1975.

== 2023 Yale University reprise ==
In August 2023, the Yale Police Benevolent Association, which represents campus police at Yale University distributed fliers that were a close copy of the 1975 Fear City pamphlets to new students arriving on campus. The 2023 Fear City pamphlets warned students that crime in the local city of New Haven, Connecticut was "shockingly high" and that students should avoid the city, especially at night. They also said that "murders have doubled, burglaries are up 33 percent and motor vehicle thefts are up 56 percent," for 2023.

The mayor of New Haven said the statistics in the leaflet were accurate, but that violent crime had decreased 29% over the past three years, and the information didn't present a complete picture. School and city officials criticized the union for distributing the leaflets and said it was a scare tactic to get better terms during an ongoing contract negotiation. The police union claimed the pamphlets were intended to keep students safe and weren't related to the contract negotiations.
