= Red Hook Summer =

2012 film directed by Spike Lee

- Theatrical release poster
- Directed by: Spike Lee
- Written by: James McBride; Spike Lee
- Produced by: Spike Lee
- Starring: Clarke Peters; Nate Parker; Thomas Jefferson Byrd; Toni Lysaith; Jules Brown
- Cinematography: Kerwin DeVonish
- Edited by: Hye Mee Na
- Music by: Bruce Hornsby (score); Judith Hill (songs)
- Production company: 40 Acres and a Mule Filmworks
- Distributed by: Variance Films
- Release dates: January 2012 (Sundance); August 10, 2012
- Running time: 124 minutes
- Country: United States
- Language: English
- Box office: $338,803

Red Hook Summer is a 2012 American drama film co-written and directed by Spike Lee. It is Lee's sixth film in his "Chronicles of Brooklyn" series following She's Gotta Have It, Do the Right Thing, Crooklyn, Clockers, and He Got Game.

== Plot ==
Flik Royale is a pampered 13-year-old boy from Atlanta who is sent to live with his preacher grandfather, Da Good Bishop Enoch Rouse, in Red Hook, Brooklyn. Flik struggles to connect with his religious grandfather, and clashes with him over religion, technology, and other subjects. He develops a friendship with a girl named Chazz and encounters Box, a gangster who used to attend Enoch's church.

In the midst of a sermon, a strange man strolls into the back of the church and accuses Bishop Enoch of molesting him 15 years earlier in Georgia. Enoch admits to the abuse, and says that it was subsequently covered up by his church, which paid the boy's family hush money and let Enoch go free to start a new life in Brooklyn. The news causes members of his new congregation to turn against him and for Box and his men to beat him up.

Flik is sent home to his mother, and says goodbye to Chazz.

== Cast ==
- Clarke Peters as Da Good Bishop Enoch Rouse
- Nate Parker as Box
- Thomas Jefferson Byrd as Deacon Zee
- Toni Lysaith as Chazz Morningstar
- Jules Brown as Flik Royale
- Jon Batiste as Da Organist T.K. Hazelton
- Colman Domingo as adult Blessing Rowe
- Heather Simms as Sister Sharon Morningstar
- James Ransone as Kevin
- De'Adre Aziza as Colleen Royale
- Isiah Whitlock Jr. as Detective Flood
- Tracy Camilla Johns as Mother Darling
- Spike Lee appears briefly as Mookie, the main character from his 1989 film Do the Right Thing, wearing his original "Sal's Pizzeria" shirt. (Uncredited)

== Production ==
Principal photography lasted three weeks, "on a small budget, guerrilla-style, like Lee's first feature film."

Red Hook Summer marked the first time that Lee appeared in one of his films since Summer of Sam (1999).

== Release ==
A 135-minute version of Red Hook Summer premiered at the 2012 Sundance Film Festival; The film was released on August 10, 2012, in select theaters of the New York City area and was released in Los Angeles and other parts of the United States on August 24, 2012. The film reached 41 theaters at its peak.

The film was released on home video on December 21, 2012.

== Reception ==
On review aggregator Rotten Tomatoes, the film holds an approval rating of 58% based on 66 reviews, with an average rating of 5.46/10. The website's critics consensus reads: "Red Hook Summer is just as bold and energetic as Spike Lee's best work, but its story is undermined by a jarring plot twist in the final act." On Metacritic, the film has a weighted average score of 48 out of 100, based on 25 critics, indicating "average or mixed reviews".

Peter Debruge of Variety said "It's fiery, passionate stuff, at times inelegantly presented, but impossible to ignore."

Roger Ebert gave the film 2½ out of four stars saying it "plays as if the director is making it up as he goes along. That's not entirely a bad thing, although some will be thrown off-balance by an abrupt plot development halfway through that appears entirely out of the blue and is so shocking that the movie never really recovers. Here is Lee at his most spontaneous and sincere, but he could have used another screenplay draft."

== Lee's commentary ==
In an audio commentary that accompanies the DVD, Lee calls the film "another chapter in what I call my chronicles of...the Republic of Brooklyn, New York" (She's Gotta Have It, Do the Right Thing, Crooklyn, Clockers, He Got Game, half of Jungle Fever). It portrays the Red Hook Projects, where his co-producer and co-screenwriter, James McBride, grew up. The "Lil' Peace of Heaven Baptist Church of Red Hook" is actually the New Brown Memorial Baptist Church, 609 Clinton Street, which was born in McBride's parents' kitchen. McBride grew up in that church.

It was all shot on location, within a 10-block radius, over 18 days, three 6-day weeks, "under the radar". In addition to the church, the real building at 79 Lorraine St. is used; the movie shows the address over the entrance. "People didn't know we were making a movie until filming started." Lee financed it out of his pocket; he had just bought a new camera.

None of the children had been in a movie before; Lee did not want professional child actors. He visited his old junior high school looking for actors, and the drama teacher was on the movie set "to keep the students focused". Lee's New York University graduate students also participated in the production.

Music is an important part of the movie. There are 11 songs by Judith Hill, an original score by Bruce Hornsby, and a real church organist on the Church's Hammond organ.

Lee points out some small local themes in the movie:

- "Asthma is one of the issues we deal with in this film," exacerbated by the air pollution brought by the cruise liners that call at Red Hook. (Lee is asthmatic.)
- Gentrification. Around the central projects there is gentrification on both sides, represented by the fresh cement in front of a house, which the two child leads deface.
- Technology — Flik's constant use of his iPad 2 (some of what he shot on his iPad was used in the movie); communicating via Skype with his mother.
- The very controversial Ikea store.
- Red Hook is the only place from which the front of the Statue of Liberty can be seen (it faces its donor nation, France).

== See also ==
- List of black films of the 2010s
