= Tracy Camilla Johns =

American film actress (born 1963)

- Born: April 12, 1963 (age 63)
- Occupation: Actress
- Years active: 1986–1991; 2012–2017

Tracy Camilla Johns (born April 12, 1963) is an American film actress. She is known for her feature film debut in the leading role as Nola Darling in Spike Lee's 1986 film She's Gotta Have It. She was nominated for Best Female Lead for this role at the 1987 Independent Spirit Awards.

Johns appeared in an Air Jordan advertisement with Lee and Michael Jordan in 1988, and in the same year in the music video for Tone Lōc's 1988 single "Wild Thing". Johns later appeared in the films Mo' Better Blues (1990) and New Jack City (1991), and in roles in the TV series Family Ties, She's Gotta Have It, and Snoops.

Johns returned to the role of Nola Darling in Lee's 2012 film Red Hook Summer, playing the character as an older woman who had become a Jehovah's Witness.

== Filmography ==
- 2012 : Red Hook Summer as Mother Darling
- 1991 : New Jack City as Uniqua
- 1990 : Mo' Better Blues as Club Patron
- 1989 : Snoops (TV Series) as Yolanda (8 episodes)
- 1987 : Family Ties as Dana (1 episode, "Mister Sister")
- 1986 : She's Gotta Have It as Nola Darling
