= Crooklyn =

1994 film directed by Spike Lee

- Theatrical release poster
- Directed by: Spike Lee
- Screenplay by: Joie Susannah Lee; Cinqué Lee; Spike Lee
- Story by: Joie Susannah Lee
- Produced by: Spike Lee
- Starring: Alfre Woodard; Delroy Lindo; Spike Lee; Zelda Harris
- Cinematography: Arthur Jafa
- Edited by: Barry Alexander Brown
- Music by: Terence Blanchard
- Production company: 40 Acres and a Mule Filmworks
- Distributed by: Universal Pictures
- Release date: May 13, 1994
- Running time: 115 minutes
- Country: United States
- Language: English
- Budget: $14 million
- Box office: $13.6 million

Crooklyn is a 1994 American comedy-drama film produced and directed by Spike Lee, who wrote it with his siblings Joie and Cinqué. Taking place in the Bedford–Stuyvesant neighborhood of Brooklyn, New York, during the summer of 1973, the film primarily centers on a young girl named Troy Carmichael (played by Zelda Harris in her film debut), and her family. Troy learns life lessons through her rowdy brothers Clinton, Wendell, Nate, and Joseph; her loving but strict mother Carolyn (Alfre Woodard), and her naive, struggling father Woody (Delroy Lindo).

A distinctive characteristic of Crooklyn is its soundtrack, composed almost completely of music from the 1960s and 1970s. The exception is the hit single "Crooklyn" by the Crooklyn Dodgers, a rap crew consisting of Buckshot, Masta Ace, and Special Ed. A two-volume release of the soundtrack became available on CD concurrent with release of the film.

As in his past films such as School Daze, Do the Right Thing, and She's Gotta Have It, Spike Lee appears in Crooklyn. He plays a young glue huffer named Snuffy, who likes to bully the local children.

New Yorkers selected the film in 2017 for simultaneous screenings across New York City as part of that year's "One Film, One New York" contest.

== Plot ==
In 1973, 9-year-old Troy Carmichael and her brothers Clinton, Wendell, Nate, and Joseph live in the Bedford-Stuyvesant neighborhood of Brooklyn with their parents Woody, a struggling musician, and Carolyn, a schoolteacher. The neighborhood is filled with colorful people, such as Tony Eyes, the Carmichaels' next-door neighbor, whose house emits the foul smell of dog feces; Tommy La-La, who continuously sings; and Snuffy and Right Hand Man, glue sniffers; and war veteran Vic Powell, who rents from the Carmichaels and lives upstairs.

One day, the Carmichael children get into an argument with Tony after he sees Wendell throwing trash into his area. It escalates when their mother Carolyn and several neighborhood children get involved. But Vic comes downstairs and punches Tony in the face. Troy, who has sneaked out to the corner store, sees Vic getting arrested as she leaves the store.

One night, Woody and Carolyn argue about money; Carolyn resents Woody for using their money carelessly to fund his solo career. As the argument escalates, Carolyn yells for the children to turn off the television; later she turns it off herself. Clinton turns his back on her and she grabs him for disobeying. Woody grabs her and carries her out of the room, and down the stairs. Nate jumps on his father's back as the other children hold Carolyn apart; she hurts her ankle in the struggle. Carolyn kicks Woody out of the house, but later he brings her flowers and they reconcile.

The family decides to go on a trip but, as they are leaving, a worker from Con Ed arrives to shut off the electricity due to an unpaid bill. The family has to postpone the trip and use candles for light.

A few days later, the family travels to the South to stay with affluent relatives. Troy stays for a longer period with her cousin, Viola, who was adopted by Uncle Clem and Aunt Song. Troy has fun with Viola despite disliking her snobby aunt and her dog, Queenie. On Troy's tenth birthday, she gets a letter from her mother. After reading the letter and dealing with bickering between Viola and Aunt Song, Troy decides she wants to go home.

When Troy returns to New York, her Aunt Maxine and Uncle Brown pick her up at the airport. Troy later learns her mother is in the hospital; she is taken to see her. Later that evening, Woody tells the kids that their mother has cancer and must stay in the hospital. The boys cry, but Troy remains stoic. Troy begins filling her mother's role. Carolyn continues to be treated in the hospital but later dies.

Afterward, one of Troy's brothers wonders if they have to dress up for their mother's funeral. On the day of the funeral, Troy's Aunt Maxine coaxes her into trying on the new clothes she's brought, telling her it would make Carolyn proud. Troy calmly says that her mother has a strong dislike of polyester and would never let her wear it. Then she tells her father that she is not going to the funeral. After he says that Carolyn would want them all together at church, Troy agrees to go.

At the house gathering after the funeral, Troy is withdrawn. Joseph comes inside crying, saying that Snuffy and Right Hand Man robbed him. Following her mother's wishes for her to protect her younger brother, Troy takes a baseball bat outside and hits Snuffy, telling him to go sniff glue on his own block.

Early the next morning, Troy dreams she's hearing her mother's voice. She goes downstairs and sees her father trying to kill a rat in the kitchen. He says that it is all right to cry, and that even her oldest brother Clinton has cried. Troy concludes that it is good that her mother's suffering has ended.

As the summer ends, the Carmichael family and their friends gradually resume their lives. Troy assumes the matriarch role left by her mother. Carolyn's spirit visits Troy, praising her for taking on such responsibilities.

== Cast ==
- Alfre Woodard as Carolyn
- Delroy Lindo as Woody
- David Patrick Kelly as Tony Eyes
- Zelda Harris as Troy
- Tse-Mach Washington as Joseph
- Carlton Williams as Clinton
- Christopher Knowings as Nate
- Sharif Rashed as Wendell
- José Zuniga as Tommy La La
- Isaiah Washington as Vic Powell
- Ivelka Reyes as Jessica
- Spike Lee as Snuffy
- N. Jeremi Duru as Right Hand Man
- Frances Foster as Aunt Song
- Norman Matlock as Clem
- Patriece Nelson as Viola
- Joie Susannah Lee as Aunt Maxine
- Vondie Curtis-Hall as Uncle Brown
- Bokeem Woodbine as Richard
- Gary Perez as Juan the Bodega Man

RuPaul makes his feature film debut playing Connie, a woman customer who dances with another customer at the bodega. While co-screenwriter and actress Joie Susannah Lee is shown in the opening credits as one of the actors, she does not appear in the cast closing credits. She does appear in the filmmaker closing credits scroll.

== Development and production ==
The concept and story for Crooklyn were created by Joie Lee in her first screenplay. She sold it to her older brother, Spike Lee, to direct and film. There was said to be creative and financial conflict among the three siblings (Spike Lee, Joie Lee, and Cinqué Lee), who all were credited as co-writers. Joie Lee had major creative direction in the movie's production through casting and advising actors according to her accounts of her childhood. She played the role of Aunt Maxine in the movie.

Spike Lee had signed to a multiyear deal with Universal Studios, giving them the first look at buying any of his films. In March 1993 they approved production for Crooklyn, which would be the first one made under this deal. Lee co-wrote the script with two of his siblings, drawing from their own life experience for the story of the mother's illness and its effects on the family. Zelda Harris was cast for the role of Troy through an open audition process. For the music in the film, Lee picked all the songs himself, choosing ones from his childhood. The filming took place on location in New York, including Fort Greene Park.

During the scenes of the film set in the South, the shots were filmed with an anamorphic lens. It produced a squeezed appearance, expressing the alienated feelings Troy was having in a place very strange to her. During the original run of the film, audience members were confused by these squeezed images, assuming there was some kind of technical error, so the studio put up signs in the theaters to explain the effect was intentional.

== Themes and analysis ==
Crooklyn depicts themes of black girlhood and coming of age through the narrative of Director, Spike Lee's sister, Joie Lee, and her own story of growing up with brothers in Brooklyn. The story of Crooklyn also focuses on themes of loss, family, nostalgia, memory, youth, and the black experience.

Lee uses elements of docufiction and a character-driven plot to showcase the everyday life of a family in New York. He considers the movie to be more of a reflection and break-down of what the family went through based on the scope of the understanding of Joie, Cinque, and him as children.

The film focuses on the emotional and literal details of family life from Troy's perspective. Film critics mention how Crooklyn depicts the themes of change and connection that can come with the death of someone close. After Carolyn's death, relationships and dynamics shift in the Carmichael household and beyond.

== Release and reception ==
Crooklyn premiered at the San Francisco International Film Festival on May 12, 1994. It was released to theaters in May 1994, and debuted at number three at the box office.

Janet Maslin of The New York Times wrote: "Messy as the semiautobiographical Crooklyn often is, it succeeds in becoming a touching and generous family portrait, a film that exposes welcome new aspects of this director's talent." Todd McCarthy of Variety described the film as "both annoying and vibrant, casually plotted and deeply personal," adding that it "ends up being as compelling as it is messy".

Roger Ebert gave the film three-and-a-half stars out of four, saying: "Lee's wonderful opening title sequence shows the children's street games that flourished in Brooklyn in the 1970s. Today, he says, those games have died, and he had to teach them to the actors who played the children. They have died because the kids in comparable neighborhoods today are afraid to go outside and play in the streets. Crooklyn is not in any way an angry film. But thinking about the difference between its world and ours can make you angry, and I think that was one of Lee's purposes here."

In a 2018 Variety article looking back on Lee's filmography, Joe Leydon ranked Crooklyn at ninth place: "At once street smart and sweetly sentimental, this warmly nostalgic coming-of-age drama could be described as a Spike Lee movie for people who normally dislike Spike Lee movies."

On Rotten Tomatoes the film has a rating of 79% based on 34 reviews. The site's consensus reads, "A personal project that warmly reflects on Spike Lee's childhood, Crooklyn is an episodic celebration of family and the indelible facets of one's hometown". Metacritic, which uses a weighted average, assigned the film a score of 65 out of 100, based on 16 critics, indicating "generally favorable" reviews. Audiences surveyed by CinemaScore gave the film an "B" on a scale of A+ to F.

== Year-end lists ==
- Honorable mention – Dan Craft, The Pantagraph
- Honorable mention – Dennis King, Tulsa World
- Honorable mention – Duane Dudek, Milwaukee Sentinel
- 10th worst – John Hurley, Staten Island Advance

== Legacy ==
In the 2017 "One Film, One New York" contest, New Yorkers selected the film for free, simultaneous screenings across all five New York City boroughs.

== See also ==
- List of hood films
