= Get on the Bus =

- Theatrical release poster
- Directed by: Spike Lee
- Written by: Reggie Rock Bythewood
- Produced by: Reuben Cannon; Barry Rosenbush; Bill Borden
- Starring: De'aundre Bonds; Andre Braugher; Thomas Jefferson Byrd; Gabriel Casseus; Albert Hall; Hill Harper; Harry Lennix; Bernie Mac; Wendell Pierce; Roger Guenveur Smith; Isaiah Washington; Steve White; Ossie Davis; Charles S. Dutton; Richard Belzer
- Cinematography: Elliot Davis
- Edited by: Leander T. Sales
- Music by: Terence Blanchard
- Production companies: Columbia Pictures; 40 Acres and a Mule Filmworks
- Distributed by: Sony Pictures Releasing
- Release date: October 16, 1996
- Running time: 122 minutes
- Country: United States
- Language: English
- Budget: $2.4 million
- Box office: $5.6 million

Get on the Bus is a 1996 American drama road film about a group of African-American men who are taking a cross-country bus trip in order to participate in the Million Man March. Directed by Spike Lee and premiering on the first anniversary of the March, it is the first film directed by Lee in which he does not appear.

== Plot ==
Fifteen disparate African American men board a bus in Los Angeles bound for Washington, D.C., where they plan on attending the Million Man March. Other than their race, destination, and gender, the men have nothing in common: George is the trip organizer; Xavier is an aspiring filmmaker hoping to make a documentary of the March; Flip is the vain but charismatic and openly homophobic and sexist actor; Kyle and Randall are a homosexual couple; Gary, a biracial police officer; Jamal is a former gang banger turned devout Muslim who has evaded prosecution for the murders he committed; Evan Jr., is a petty criminal who has been permitted to break probation to attend the march on the condition that he remain handcuffed to his father, Evan Sr.

As the bus travels across country, Xavier conducts interviews with the various attendees, allowing them to express their views on race, religion, and politics. The interviews often provoke outbursts from other men on the bus, invariably leading to many political confrontations. Jeremiah, the eldest member of the group, is an 80-year-old former alcoholic who lost his job and family, has found new meaning in life and is energized by the Million Man March, and embraces his African heritage; his philosophies on the black experience and stories of precolonial Africa serve to unite the men and ease tensions and the infighting among them.

En route the bus breaks down and the men are forced to board another bus, driven by an ethnically Jewish white man named Rick. A couple of the passengers harass Rick as a white man, and Rick ultimately refuses to drive any further, citing the group's prejudice and his opposition to antisemitic remarks made by the leader of the march, Louis Farrakhan. George, himself a bus driver, accuses Rick of cultural racism, but begrudgingly agrees to cover for Rick, who leaves. George takes over driving for the remainder of the trip, with help from Evan Sr.

As the bus passes through the American south, the men are greeted hospitably by several white southerners at various restaurants and rest stops. At one stop, the men pick up Wendell, a wealthy African American Lexus salesman who sees attending the march as a way to make business connections. Wendell, a self-proclaimed conservative Republican, makes disparaging remarks about whom he sees as lazy and stupid African Americans. Though he gets some agreement from Kyle, ultimately the other men perceive Wendell as too insulting and just wanting to make money off the march; they forcibly toss him out of the bus.

In Knoxville, Tennessee, the bus is pulled over by a pair of racist state troopers, who accuse the men of using the bus to smuggle drugs. The bus and its passengers are checked by a drug-sniffing police dog, turning up no evidence of drugs; the troopers then condescendingly allow the bus to resume its journey.

As the bus nears Washington, Jeremiah passes out and is rushed to a hospital. The doctors there discover that Jeremiah is suffering from advanced coronary artery disease, which made the stress of the trip potentially deadly for him. Evan Sr. and Jr., Gary, Jamal, and Xavier opt to stay with Jeremiah at the hospital and watch the march on television while the rest of the men leave in the bus to attend. Shortly after they leave, Jeremiah dies. The rest of the group returns to the hospital, saying that, to stay true to the spirit of the March, they chose not to attend the march but to return and be with Jeremiah.

As the bus prepares to return to Los Angeles, the men find a prayer that Jeremiah wrote with the intention of praying it when the bus arrived at Washington, D.C. The men drive to the Lincoln Memorial, where George leads the men in Jeremiah's prayer, and the film ends with Evan Jr. and Senior's handcuffs left at the Lincoln memorial.

== Characters ==
- Charles S. Dutton as George, the bus driver and trip organizer.
- Ossie Davis as Jeremiah "Pop", a downsized senior citizen who is an expert on African-American history.
- Thomas Jefferson Byrd and De'Aundre Bonds as Evan and Evan "Smooth" Jr., an estranged father and son who are court ordered to be shackled together for 72 hours after Junior's arrest for petty theft.
- Isaiah Washington and Harry J. Lennix as Kyle and Randall, a gay couple in the midst of breaking up.
- Andre Braugher as Philip "Flip", a narcissistic actor.
- Roger Guenveur Smith as Gary Rivers, a police officer who is half black and half white.
- Hill Harper as Xavier "X" Moore, a UCLA Film School student who is making a documentary.
- Gabriel Casseus as Jamal, a former gangster turned Muslim seeking redemption.
- Bernie Mac as Jay, a bubble gum company owner.
- Steve White as Mike, a conspiracy theorist who thinks the March is a plot to gather one million black men in one place for mass extermination.
- Albert Hall as Craig, the original bus driver who is dealing with his teenage daughter's pregnancy.

=== Other passengers ===
Three additional bus passengers are shown observing the action. They are credited but are not introduced nor are they given dialogue:

- Jadi McCurdy as Ja-Dee, a young man with dreadlocks.
- Hosea Brown III as Doc Brown, a real-life M.D. who served as the set doctor during filming.
- Guy Margo as Khalid, a member of the Nation of Islam.

=== Additional cast ===
- Richard Belzer as Rick
- Wendell Pierce as Wendell Perry
- Kristen Wilson as Shelly Maxwell
- Paula Jai Parker as Jamilia
- Gina Ravera as Gina
- Joie Lee as Jindal
- Randy Quaid (uncredited) as Tennessee State Trooper

== Soundtrack ==
The soundtrack to the film, Get on the Bus: Music from and Inspired by the Motion Picture, was released in October 1996 on Interscope Records. "New World Order" by Curtis Mayfield was released as a single.

Michael Jackson recorded the song "On the Line" specifically for the film. It can be heard during the opening credits. Although it wasn't included on the soundtrack album, it was released on the Limited Edition Minimax CD included in the Deluxe Collector Box Set of Michael Jackson's Ghosts in 1997, with a longer version released on the 2004 box set The Ultimate Collection.

== Reception ==
The film received generally positive reviews. On the review aggregator website Rotten Tomatoes, the film scored an 89% rating, based on reviews from 45 critics. The website's consensus reads, "Get on the Bus finds Spike Lee pulling a page from history with fervor and flair, offering a strong, stirring fact-based drama further elevated by an array of solid performances."

Critic Roger Ebert gave the film a perfect four star rating, stating "What makes Get on the Bus extraordinary is the truth and feeling that go into its episodes". Todd McCarthy at Variety praised the film, calling it "A vital regeneration of a filmmaker's talent as well as a bracing and often very funny dramatization of urgent sociopolitical themes" and he called the film "Spike Lee's most satisfying work since Do the Right Thing."

The film was entered into the 47th Berlin International Film Festival where it won an Honourable Mention.
