= Joie Lee =

American screenwriter, producer, and actress

- Occupations: Actress; film producer; screenwriter
- Years active: 1986–present
- Father: Bill Lee
- Relatives: Spike Lee (brother); David Lee (brother); Cinqué Lee (brother); Malcolm D. Lee (cousin)

Joie Susannah Lee (/ʒwɑː/) is an American actress, film producer, and screenwriter.

== Early years ==
Lee is the daughter of William James Edward Lee III, a jazz musician, bassist, actor and composer.

== Career ==
She has appeared in many of the films directed by her brother, Spike Lee, including She's Gotta Have It (1986), School Daze (1988), Do the Right Thing (1989), and Mo' Better Blues (1990). She also co-wrote and produced the film Crooklyn (1994). A movie without her brother's involvement she appears in is A Kiss Before Dying (1991).

=== Actor ===
Year	Film	Role	Notes
1986	She's Gotta Have It	Clorinda Bradford	
1988	School Daze	Lizzie Life	
1989	Do the Right Thing	Jade	
1990	Mo' Better Blues	Indigo Downes	
1990	Bail Jumper	Athena	
1991	A Kiss Before Dying	Cathy	Credited as Joy Lee
1992	Fathers & Sons	Lois	
1994	Crooklyn	Aunt Maxine	Credited, in opening actor credits, as Joie Susannah Lee. Not credited in closing credits cast scroll. Also Associate Producer/Writer
1995	Nowhere Fast	Joie	
1995	Losing Isaiah	Marie	
1996	Girl 6	Switchboard Operator	
1996	Get on the Bus	Jindal	
1999	Personals	Poet Woman	
1999	Summer of Sam	Bed Stuy Woman Interviewed	
2003	Coffee and Cigarettes	Good Twin	Segment: Twins
2004	She Hate Me	Gloria Reid	
2006	Full Grown Men	Annie	
2007	Starting Out in the Evening	Second Author	
2010	Window on Your Present	Cloakey's Girlfriend	
2014	Da Sweet Blood of Jesus	Nurse Colquitt	
2020	Farewell Amor	Nzingha	

Year	TV series	Role	Notes
2016	Rectify	Bonnie	1 Episode
2017–19	She's Gotta Have It	Septima Darling	TV series: 11 Episodes; Also Writer
2019	Broad City	Toy Harris	1 Episode
2023	Harlem	Deborah	TV series: 2 Episodes (season 2)

=== Director ===
- 2022 Untitled (short)
- 2023 Vitapoise (short)
