= Mo' Better Blues =

1990 film by Spike Lee

- Theatrical release poster
- Directed by: Spike Lee
- Written by: Spike Lee
- Produced by: Spike Lee
- Starring: Denzel Washington; Spike Lee; Wesley Snipes; Giancarlo Esposito; Robin Harris; Joie Lee; Bill Nunn; John Turturro; Dick Anthony Williams; Cynda Williams
- Cinematography: Ernest Dickerson
- Edited by: Samuel D. Pollard
- Music by: Bill Lee
- Production company: 40 Acres and a Mule Filmworks
- Distributed by: Universal Pictures
- Release date: August 3, 1990
- Running time: 130 minutes
- Country: United States
- Language: English
- Budget: $10 million
- Box office: $16,153,600 (USA; subtotal)

Mo' Better Blues is a 1990 American comedy-drama film produced, written, and directed by Spike Lee. It stars Denzel Washington, Wesley Snipes, Lee, Joie Lee, Giancarlo Esposito, Cynda Williams, John Turturro, Bill Nunn, and Dick Anthony Williams. It follows a period in the life of fictional jazz trumpeter Bleek Gilliam (played by Washington) as a series of bad decisions result in his jeopardizing both his relationships and his playing career. The film focuses on themes of friendship, loyalty, honesty, cause-and-effect, and ultimately salvation. It features the music of the Branford Marsalis quartet and Terence Blanchard on trumpet. The film was released five months after the death of Robin Harris and is dedicated to his memory, being his final acting role. The film received mostly positive reviews from critics, though Lee was accused of antisemitism by several critics and organizations. It was a box office failure, grossing 16 million dollars on a budget of 10 million.

== Plot ==
In Brooklyn, New York in 1969, four boys approach Minifield "Bleek" Gilliam's Brownstone apartment and ask him to play baseball with them. His mother Lillian insists that he continue his trumpet lesson, greatly annoying him, but his father "Big Stop" fears that Bleek will become a sissy, and a family argument ensues. Bleek resumes practicing, and his friends depart.

Twenty years later, an adult Bleek performs at the Beneath the Underdog jazz and comedy nightclub with his successful jazz ensemble, The Bleek Quintet. One night, his childhood friend Giant, also the band's manager, advises him to dissuade his tenor saxophone player Shadow Henderson from grandstanding with long solos. The next morning, Bleek awakens with his girlfriend, schoolteacher Indigo Downes. During a game of catch with Big Stop, he explains his reluctance to commit to a stable romantic relationship. That afternoon, another woman named Clarke Bentancourt visits him. She suggests relieving Giant as manager; responsively, he suggests sexual intercourse (which he refers to as "mo' better"), but becomes upset when she bites his bottom lip.

After betting on baseball games with his bookie Petey, Giant encounters Bleek at the club with most of the other band members, but scolds pianist Left Hand Lacey for arriving late with his French girlfriend. Later, in the office of the club's Jewish owners Moe and Josh Flatbush, he explains how the Quintet keeps the establishment profitable, and unsuccessfully attempts to renegotiate their contract. Undeterred by Petey's worries about his rising debt, Giant places several new bets the following morning. While he is visiting Shadow's residence to deliver a record that Bleek borrowed a year earlier, Shadow discloses his infidelity towards his girlfriend. In bed that night, Clarke denies Bleek's request to let her perform at the club.

Bleek meets with the Flatbush brothers, who reject his demands for higher financial compensation for the other members despite the band's success, citing their current deal. That night, both ladies arrive, wearing identical red gowns he purchased for them. He attempts to reconcile with each woman, but both soon abandon him after he mistakenly calls each of them by the other's name during their alternating periods of intercourse. However, tension rises with Shadow who has feelings for Clarke.

During a bicycle ride together in the park, Giant promises Bleek to manage the ensemble more effectively and efficiently, and then requests a loan to liquidate his debts. Bleek declines, and later two loan sharks apprehend Giant, breaking his fingers because of his unfulfilled payments. Bleek doubts Giant's claims that his injury stems from hitting a pothole while on his bicycle, but Left loans him five hundred dollars. When the loan sharks stake out Giant's home, Bleek agrees to house him temporarily and help him raise the money but relieves him as manager.

Missing both his girlfriends, Bleek leaves messages for each, but discovers Clarke's new relationship with Shadow and dismisses him from the band. The loan sharks track down Giant at the club, drag him outside into an alley, and assault him while Bleek is performing. Overhearing and noticing the commotion, he heads outside to intervene and is assaulted to the point of hospitalization when he is smacked across the face with his own trumpet, permanently injuring his lip and ending his performing career.

Over a year later, the recovered Bleek re-encounters Giant, who has become a doorman at the Dizzy Club and stopped gambling, while Clarke is now a vocalist with his former group, now dubbed The Shadow Henderson Quartet. Shadow invites him onstage, and they play together. Unable to perform correctly due to scarred lips, Bleek walks offstage, donates his trumpet to an understanding and supportive Giant, and visits Indigo's house. Indigo berates him for ignoring both her telephone calls and her requests to visit, but he implores her to marry him and save his life. Eventually, the pair marry, move in with Big Stop, and have a son named Miles, who commences trumpet lessons starting at age 5. One day, Miles, now ten years old, wants to play outside with his friends, but Indigo implores him to finish his daily lesson. However, unlike his own father, Bleek relents and permits Miles to conclude his session early.

== Cast ==
- Denzel Washington as Minifield "Bleek" Gilliam
- Spike Lee as "Giant"
- Wesley Snipes as "Shadow" Henderson
- Joie Lee as Indigo Downes
- Cynda Williams as Clarke Bentancourt
- Giancarlo Esposito as "Left Hand" Lacey
- Bill Nunn as "Bottom" Hammer
- Jeff "Tain" Watts as "Rhythm" Jones
- Dick Anthony Williams as Mr. "Big Stop" Gilliam
- Abbey Lincoln as Lillian Gilliam
- John Turturro as "Moe" Flatbush
- Nicholas Turturro as Josh Flatbush
- Robin Harris as "Butterbean" Jones
- Samuel L. Jackson as Madlock
- Leonard L. Thomas as Rod
- Charlie Murphy as "Eggy"
- Steve White as "Born Knowledge"
- Coati Mundi as Roberto
- Rubén Blades as Petey
- John Canada Terrell as Club Patron
- Tracy Camilla Johns as Club Patron

== Production ==
Spike Lee wrote the film while working on Do the Right Thing (1989). It took him fifteen days to complete the first draft. The nickname "Bleek" for the protagonist was derived from Lee's father, Bill Lee, who composed the film's music score. Initially contemplating the use of real musicians, Lee opted mostly for actors, with Jeff "Tain" Watts being an exception, playing drums in the actual Branford Marsalis Quartet. Giancarlo Esposito, who portrayed "Left Hand Lacey," was a real-life pianist. Branford Marsalis, making a cameo, was originally cast as saxophonist "Shadow Henderson," but Lee chose a professional actor, Wesley Snipes, for the role. Both Denzel Washington and Snipes underwent musical training with Marsalis and trumpeter Terence Blanchard to authentically handle their instruments in musical scenes. Lee also intentionally excluded drugs from the film to challenge stereotypical views of jazz musicians. The film's original title, Love Supreme, inspired by saxophonist John Coltrane's 1965 album "A Love Supreme," was changed after his widow, Alice Coltrane, withdrew permission because of the film's explicit content. The title was temporarily changed to Variations on the Mo' Better Blues until at least May 1990, when it was ultimately shortened. Filming began on September 25, 1989, and wrapped on December 1, 1989, with a total cost of $10 million. Actor-comedian Robin Harris, who played Butterbean Jones in the film and previously worked with Lee on Do the Right Thing, died on March 18, 1990, almost six months before the film's release.

== Music ==
The soundtrack to the film was played by “The Branford Marsalis Quartet Featuring Terence Blanchard”; the title composition and most of the soundtrack were written and produced by Bill Lee. In 1991, the soundtrack album was nominated for a Soul Train Music Award for Best Jazz Album. Delfeayo Marsalis, Branford Marsalis's younger brother, reportedly aided Bill Lee in producing most of the film's recordings, although his name is not credited.

Music from Mo' Better Blues

Soundtrack album by Branford Marsalis Quartet and Terence Blanchard
- Released: July 31, 1990
- Studios: RCA (New York City); Sound on Sound (New York City)
- Genre: Jazz
- Length: 37:35
- Label: Columbia
- Producers: Bill Lee; Delfeayo Marsalis; DJ Premier; Raymond Jones

=== Track listing ===
No.	Title	Writer(s)	Producer(s)	Length
1.	"Harlem Blues" (featuring Cynda Williams)	William Christopher Handy	Raymond Jones	4:50
2.	"Say Hey"	Branford Marsalis	Delfeayo Marsalis	3:18
3.	"Knocked Out the Box"	B. Marsalis	Delfeayo Marsalis	1:35
4.	"Again, Never"	William James Edwards Lee III	Bill Lee	3:54
5.	"Mo' Better Blues"	Lee III	Bill Lee	3:39
6.	"Pop Top 40" (featuring Denzel Washington and Wesley Snipes)	B. Marsalis; Shelton Jackson Lee	Delfeayo Marsalis	5:40
7.	"Beneath the Underdog"	B. Marsalis	Delfeayo Marsalis	5:07
8.	"Jazz Thing" (featuring Gang Starr)	Keith Elam; Christopher Martin; B. Marsalis; Lolis Eric Elie	DJ Premier; Branford Marsalis (co.)	4:50
9.	"Harlem Blues (Acapulco Version)" (featuring Cynda Williams)	Handy	Raymond Jones	4:48
Total length:				37:35

=== Musicians ===
- Branford Marsalis – Tenor Saxophone, Soprano Saxophone
- Kenny Kirkland – Piano
- Robert Hurst – Bass
- Jeff "Tain" Watts – Drums
- Terence Blanchard – Trumpet

== Release ==
The film was released on August 3, 1990, by Universal Pictures and 40 Acres and a Mule Filmworks.

=== Home media ===
Mo' Better Blues was released on VHS on January 17, 1991, by MCA/Universal Home Video. On January 30, 2001, the film was released on DVD by Universal Studios Home Video.

On February 4, 2020, the film was released on Blu-ray by Kino Lorber Studio Classics.

== Reception ==
=== Critical response ===
Mo' Better Blues received mixed to positive reviews from critics, as the film holds a 72% rating on Rotten Tomatoes based on 36 reviews. The consensus states: "Mo' Better Blues is rich with vibrant hues and Denzel Washington's impassioned performance, although its straightforward telling lacks the political punch fans expect from a Spike Lee joint." Audiences polled by CinemaScore gave the film an average grade of "A" on an A+ to F scale.

=== Controversies ===
For his portrayal of Jewish nightclub owners Moe and Josh Flatbush, Lee drew the ire of the Anti-Defamation League (ADL), B'nai B'rith, and other such Jewish organizations. The ADL claimed that the characterizations of the nightclub owners "dredge up an age-old and highly dangerous form of anti-Semitic stereotyping", and the ADL was "disappointed that Spike Lee – whose success is largely due to his efforts to break down racial stereotypes and prejudice – has employed the same kind of tactics that he supposedly deplores."

Lee eventually responded in an editorial in The New York Times, alleging "a double standard at work in the accusations of anti-Semitism" given the long history of negative portrayals of African-Americans in film: "Not every black person is a pimp, murderer, prostitute, convict, rapist or drug addict, but that hasn't stopped Hollywood from writing these roles for African-Americans". Lee argues that even if the Flatbush brothers are stereotyped figures, their "10 minutes of screen time" is insignificant when compared to "100 years of Hollywood cinema ... [and] a slew of really racist, anti-Semitic filmmakers". According to Lee, his status as a successful African-American artist has led to hostility and unfair treatment: "Don't hold me to a higher moral standard than the rest of my filmmaking colleagues. ... Now that young black filmmakers have arisen in the film industry, all of a sudden stereotypes are a big issue. ... I think it's reaching the point where I'm getting reviewed, not my films."

Lee refused to apologize for his portrayal of the Flatbush brothers: "I stand behind all my work, including my characters, Moe and Josh Flatbush ... if critics are telling me that to avoid charges of anti-Semitism, all Jewish characters I write have to be model citizens, and not one can be a villain, cheat or a crook, and that no Jewish people have ever exploited black artists in the history of the entertainment industry, that's unrealistic and unfair."

Cynda Williams complained about the behavior of some of the actors on the set. "Many of the men were method actors. A couple of them had spent time together on previous Spike films, and their characters in Mo' Better Blues were kind of chauvinistic. So being method, they were kind of chauvinistic all the time on set," said Williams. "Some actors feel they have to stay in character to help play their roles." Spike Lee responded, "I didn't know about any chauvinistic behavior."

== See also ==
- List of American films of 1990
