= Never Get Outta the Boat =

- Directed by: Paul Quinn
- Written by: Nick Gillie
- Produced by: Jason Kliot; Joana Vicente
- Starring: Lombardo Boyar; Darren E. Burrows; Thomas Jefferson Byrd; Nick Gillie; Devon Gummersall; Harry Lennix; Alley Mills; Sebastian Roché; William Sanderson
- Cinematography: Robert Benavides
- Edited by: Terilyn A. Shropshire
- Music by: Victor Indrizzo
- Production companies: Blow-Up Pictures; New Crime Productions; Lot 47 Films
- Distributed by: Columbia TriStar Home Video; Lot 47 Films
- Release date: 7 September 2002 (Toronto International Film Festival)
- Running time: 111 minutes
- Country: United States
- Language: English

Never Get Outta the Boat is a 2002 American drama film directed by Paul Quinn, starring Lombardo Boyar, Darren E. Burrows, Thomas Jefferson Byrd, Nick Gillie, Devon Gummersall, Harry Lennix, Alley Mills, Sebastian Roché and William Sanderson.

== Cast ==
- Lombardo Boyar as Cesar
- Darren E. Burrows as Franky
- Thomas Jefferson Byrd as William Ellis
- Nick Gillie as Joe
- Devon Gummersall as Julian
- Harry Lennix as Brandon
- Alley Mills as Jean
- Sebastian Roché as Soren
- William Sanderson as Clarence
- Chadwick Palmatier as Henry
- Shawnee Smith as Dawn
- Patrice Pitman Quinn as Sylvia
- Emilio Rivera as Angel
- Maile Flanagan as Laura
- Michael Byrne as Manager
- Lynn Collins as Stacy
- Érica García as Rosa
- Ashley Hamilton as Joe the Drummer
- Kimberly Huie as Dana
- Nikolai Kinski as Saturn
- Allan F. Nicholls as Older Man on Phone

== Release ==
The film premiered at the Toronto International Film Festival on 7 September 2002.

== Reception ==
Robert Koehler of Variety wrote that the film is "adept at creating a sense of imbalance and tension" and praised the cinematography, the script and the performances of Boyar, Burrows, Lennix, Gillie, Roché and Lennix. Jay Boyar of the Orlando Sentinel wrote: "Its gritty, aggressively edgy atmosphere holds your attention as you begin to find yourself caring about these troubled men." The St. Louis Post-Dispatch wrote that the film "tells a familiar story uncommonly well" and praised the "fully human" characters.

J.R. Jones of the Chicago Reader wrote that while the film "succumbs to genre conventions", it was "buoyed by a strong ensemble". Cornelia de Bruin of the Taos News wrote that while the film "goes nowhere new", it is "brilliantly acted". Michael Rechtshaffen of The Hollywood Reporter wrote that the film "ends up as guilty of posturing and manufacturing synthetic realities as those cliched productions from which it believes it is distancing itself", and criticised the cinematography, the "jittery" editing and the performances.
