= Girl 6 =

1996 film by Spike Lee

- Theatrical release poster
- Directed by: Spike Lee
- Written by: Suzan-Lori Parks
- Produced by: Spike Lee
- Starring: Theresa Randle; Isaiah Washington; Spike Lee
- Cinematography: Malik Hassan Sayeed
- Edited by: Sam Pollard
- Music by: Prince
- Production companies: Fox Searchlight Pictures; 40 Acres and a Mule Filmworks
- Distributed by: 20th Century Fox
- Release date: March 22, 1996 (United States)
- Running time: 108 minutes
- Country: United States
- Language: English
- Budget: $12 million
- Box office: $4.9 million

Girl 6 is a 1996 American black comedy film produced and directed by Spike Lee. The film stars Theresa Randle, Isaiah Washington, and Lee. Suzan-Lori Parks wrote the screenplay, making it the first film directed by Lee that he did not also write. Directors Quentin Tarantino and Ron Silver make cameo appearances as film directors at a pair of auditions.

The accompanying soundtrack is composed entirely of songs written by Prince. The film was screened in the Un Certain Regard section of the 1996 Cannes Film Festival.

== Plot ==
Judy, a young and timid African-American aspiring actress living in New York City, attends an audition with Quentin Tarantino for what he describes as "the greatest romantic, African-American film ever made". Judy grows apprehensive when asked to expose her breasts, as the role requires nudity. She reluctantly complies, but then uneasily storms out of the audition.

Afterwards, Judy's agent Murray, having worked hard to arrange an audition with such a prestigious director, furiously drops her from his roster of clients. Her melodramatic acting coach also criticizes her apathy towards her acting art and the entertainment industry overall, insisting that Judy should have simply followed Tarantino's directions. This, coupled with Judy's financial issues preventing her from paying her coach for her services, results in Judy being dropped from her roster of clients as well.

Now unable to secure regular acting roles, Judy attempts numerous jobs. While returning home on the subway one night from one of her jobs as a waitress at a nightclub, she encounters a classified advertisement in the newspaper for a "friendly phone line" and another with the headline "mo' money, mo' money, mo' money", circling both. At a call center specializing in customer service and phone sex, she interviews and connects with the assertively friendly manager Lil. A striptease artist who operates a phone sex company, one among several businesses that Judy interviews with, invites her to work unrestricted from her own residence. However, as she currently cannot afford her own private telephone line, which is required for the job, she decides to reserve this opportunity for future reference.

Ultimately, Lil hires Judy as a phone sex operator at the call center. During orientation, Lil explains that although most women on the team are African-American, they should always assume the appearance of being Caucasian, unless the caller specifically requests otherwise. Assigned the moniker "Girl 6", Judy immediately settles into her new job. Her sports memorabilia-obsessed cousin and best friend Jimmy, who lives in the same apartment complex as her, worries that her new job might distract her from her acting career, but she assures him that phone sex is essentially considered a form of acting. While running errands, she occasionally encounters her kleptomaniac ex-husband, explaining her current occupation.

Having gradually become more confident and uninhibited, Judy bonds with "Bob Regular", an Arizona native who requests her specifically, for whom she adopts the alias "Lovely". Unlike other clients whom she engages with at her workplace, he converses with her in a friendly, intellectual manner, mostly about his ailing mother who is suffering from cancer. When he reveals one day he is in town for business, they arrange to meet in-person at Coney Island for lunch. As she anxiously awaits his arrival, a man passes her by; assuming he is Bob, she attempts to attract his attention, but he simply ignores her.

Shortly after despondently returning to work, Judy receives a disturbing call from a verbally abusive man. Lil, monitoring her call, disconnects him and reminds her to exercise more caution with the men that call in. Nevertheless, the man repeatedly reconnects to Judy's line, further harassing her. Noticing Judy's exhaustion, Lil temporarily dismisses her so she can gradually restore her mental health. However, Judy, now able to afford a private line, decides to continue her phone sex career at home, ignoring Jimmy's and her ex-husband's attempts to contact her.

One night, Judy engages in a conversation with a sadistic caller who fantasizes about strangling her, soon identifying him as the same abusive man who previously harassed her. As he reveals her current address, she breaks down and lashes out at him, massively pleasing him. Terrified, she runs upstairs to Jimmy's apartment for protection, telling him she has decided to abandon her phone sex career and move to Los Angeles to resume her acting career. Before departing, she reconciles with her ex-husband.

In Los Angeles, Judy attends an audition with Ron Silver who, in a similar manner to Tarantino back in New York City, asks her to expose her breasts. This time, however, she assertively departs from the audition. Having reclaimed her dignity, she confidently strolls down the Hollywood Walk of Fame, crossing the street towards Grauman's Chinese Theatre.

== Cast ==
- Theresa Randle as Judy / Girl #6
- Isaiah Washington as shoplifter
- Spike Lee as Jimmy
- Jenifer Lewis as boss #1 / Lil
- Debi Mazar as Girl #39
- Peter Berg as caller #1 / Bob
- Michael Imperioli as caller #30
- Kristen Wilson as salesgirl #1
- Debra Wilson as salesgirl #3
- Naomi Campbell as Girl #75
- Gretchen Mol as Girl #12
- Richard Belzer as caller #4 / beach
- Larry Pine as caller #33 / Wall Street
- Coati Mundi as caller #8 / Martin
- Delilah Cotto as caller #8 / Christine
- Anthony Nocerino as caller #6
- Tom Byrd III as caller #18
- Madonna as boss #3
- John Turturro as Murray, the agent
- Quentin Tarantino as director #1 / NY
- Ron Silver as director #2 / LA
- Joie Susannah Lee as switchboard operator
- Halle Berry as herself
- Susan Batson as acting coach
- Ranjit Chowdhry as Indian shopkeeper
- Mekhi Phifer as himself (uncredited)

== Home media ==
The film was released on VHS on August 6, 1996, and on DVD on March 7, 2006.

== Reception ==
=== Box office ===
The film grossed $4,939,939 domestically.

=== Critical response ===
Girl 6 received mixed reviews. On the review aggregator website Rotten Tomatoes, the film holds an approval rating of 39% based on 36 reviews, with an average rating of 4.8/10. The website's critics consensus reads, "Girl 6 has a compelling star, a Prince soundtrack, and Spike Lee's vivid style – and, unfortunately, a story that's never as compelling or insightful as it needs to be." Metacritic, which uses a weighted average, assigned the film a score of 44 out of 100, based on 23 critics, indicating "mixed or average" reviews.

Roger Ebert gave the film two out of four stars and said, "Even though Spike Lee's Girl 6 was written by a woman, it seems conceived from the point of view of a male caller, who would like to believe that the woman he's hiring by the minute is enjoying their conversation just as much as he is." He added the film's central problem is, "It's about a woman exposing herself for male entertainment, even though it pretends to be about men exposing themselves for female employment." Janet Maslin of The New York Times was more positive, writing, "Spike Lee's Girl 6 doesn't reveal much about its title character, but it does make this clear: Mr. Lee adores her. He shows his fondness for this beautiful heroine (Theresa Randle) by surrounding her with every bit of fun and flattery in his considerable arsenal. Bold colors, a dance track of Prince songs, a parade of wild costumes, good-humored sexual teasing and warmly inviting cinematography by Malik Sayeed all contribute to this comedy's high-energy party mood." Todd McCarthy of Variety said the film lacks "meaningful insight into Girl 6's character", and Rolling Stone's Peter Travers commented Lee has "sucked the fun out of call-in sex and replaced it with sanctimonious prattle".
