= Steve White (actor) =

American actor

- Occupations: Actor, comedian
- Years active: 1976–present

Steve White is an American actor and comedian, best known for his roles in Spike Lee films.

== Early life ==
Steve White attended Roosevelt High School in Roosevelt, Long Island New York. The actor Eddie Murphy was a senior at the school when White was a second-year student. White majored in accounting at Adelphi University in Garden City, New York.

== Career ==
White has worked with Spike Lee five times (Do the Right Thing in 1989, Mo' Better Blues in 1990, Malcolm X in 1992, Clockers in 1995, and Get on the Bus in 1996). From 1992 to 1997, White performed stand-up comedy on Russell Simmons's Def Comedy Jam on HBO and he also had a recurring role on the ABC comedy series Hangin' With Mr. Cooper. Steve was most recently one of the guest announcers on The Price Is Right. He also had guest appearances on 1990s black sitcom Living Single & Martin, which both aired on the Fox Network respectively.

In 2003, he won the Best Actor in a Feature Film at the 2003 American Black Film Festival as Michael. Beginning in February 2004, he became the host of The Steve White Show, a morning program on the Las Vegas music radio station KWID.

White told the 92 KQRS Morning Show on January 24, 2013, that he will appear in Robert Townsend's latest film, Playin' for Love.

== Personal life ==
In 2004, White was married with eight-month-old fraternal twins.

== Filmography ==
=== Film ===
Year	Title	Role	Notes
1976	Revenge of the Cheerleaders	Aloha Basketball Team	
1981	...All the Marbles	Body Builder	
1988	Coming to America	Subway Guy	
1989	Do the Right Thing	Ahmad	
1989	Harlem Nights	Patron	
1990	The Adventures of Ford Fairlane	Detective	
1990	Mo' Better Blues	Born Knowledge	
1991	Other People's Money	Richard	
1992	Malcolm X	Brother Johnson	Director trainee
1994	Mona Must Die	Clarence	
1995	Open Season	Leon	
1995	Clockers	Darryl Adams	
1996	Bulletproof	Veteran Cop	
1996	Get on the Bus	Mike	
1999	Goosed	Lawrence	
2000	Ping!	Agent Bruce Mechanic	
2003	Skin Deep	Michael	Also producer
2013	Playin' for Love	Reesie	
2022	Parental Discretion Advised	Principal Elliot	

=== Television ===
Year	Title	Role	Notes
1991	The Sunday Comics	Performer	Episode #1.4
1993	Living Single	Elmo Sable	Episode: "In the Black Is Beautiful"
1994–1995	Hangin' with Mr. Cooper	Steve Warner	9 episodes
1995	In the House	Emcee	Episode: "Boyz II Men II Women"
1995	Night Stand with Dick Dietrick	Tupac Zemeckis	Episode: "Hatred's Not a Four-Letter Word"
1996	The Show	Reginald Bryant III	Episode: "Pilot"
1996	Martin	Dr. Friendly	Episode: "The Tooth Will Set You Free"
1997	Arliss	Lance Rinker	Episode: "Kirby Carlisle, Trouble-Shooter"
1997	The Jamie Foxx Show	Kyle	2 episodes
1999	For Your Love	Chaz	Episode: "The Height of Passion"
2000	Martial Law	Jeff	Episode: "Deathfist Five: MCU"
2004, 2005	Phil of the Future	Various roles	2 episodes
2006	Cuts	Preston Gaines	2 episodes
