= Thomas Jefferson Byrd =

American actor (1950–2020)

- Publicity Photo of Thomas Jefferson Byrd
- Born: June 25, 1950; Griffin, Georgia, U.S.
- Died: October 3, 2020 (aged 70); Atlanta, Georgia
- Education: Morris Brown College; California Institute of the Arts
- Occupation: Actor
- Years active: 1992–2020

Thomas Jefferson Byrd (June 25, 1950 – October 3, 2020) was an American character actor who appeared in several of director Spike Lee's films. He was nominated for the Tony Award for Best Featured Actor in a Play for his performance in the 2003 Broadway revival of Ma Rainey's Black Bottom.

== Career ==
Byrd earned a Bachelor of Science degree in education from Morris Brown College and later received a Master of Fine Arts degree in dance from California Institute of the Arts. He was a member of Omega Psi Phi fraternity, Alpha Sigma chapter.

Byrd starred in numerous regional stage productions including the San Diego Repertory Theatre's award-winning performance of Spunk. He also starred in Home by Samm-Art Evans, Two Trains Running, The Piano Lesson and Ma Rainey's Black Bottom at the Alliance Theater, Flyin' West, Hamlet and Miss Evers' Boys at the Indiana Repertory, and in other productions of Flyin' West at the Brooklyn Academy of Music and at the Long Wharf Theatre.

For his Broadway debut, a performance in the 2003 revival of Ma Rainey's Black Bottom, Byrd received a Tony Award nomination for best featured actor.

Byrd appeared in several films directed by Spike Lee, including Clockers, Get on the Bus, Bamboozled, Red Hook Summer, and Chi-Raq. Byrd also appeared as Stokely Darling in Lee's Netflix series She's Gotta Have It. His other films credits include Set It Off, Ray, and Brooklyn's Finest.

== Death ==
After an emergency call was made in Atlanta, Georgia, around 1:45 a.m. on October 3, 2020, Byrd was found unresponsive with multiple gunshot wounds in his back and pronounced dead. He was 70. A spokesperson for Atlanta police said that homicide detectives were "working to determine the circumstances surrounding the incident". On October 17, 2020, a 30-year-old man named Antonio Demetrice Rhynes was arrested for having a connection to Byrd's murder. On October 24, 2023, Rhynes was sentenced to 20 years for aggravated assault in connection with Byrd's death, with 10 years suspended. He will be released no later than October 16, 2030.

== Work ==
=== Film ===
Year	Title	Role	Notes
1995	Clockers	Errol Barnes	
1996	Girl 6	Caller #18	
1996	Get on the Bus	Evan Thomas Sr.	
1996	Set It Off	Luther	
1997	Touch Me	Country Doctor	
1998	He Got Game	Sweetness	
1998	Bulworth	Uncle Rafeeq	
2000	Trois	Thomas	
2000	Bamboozled	Honeycutt	
2001	MacArthur Park	Cody	
2002	Never Get Outta the Boat	William Ellis	
2002	The Kudzu Christmas	Reverend Burton	
2004	X, Y	Marcus	
2004	Ray	Jimmy	
2009	Brooklyn's Finest	Uncle Jeb	
2010	Bronx Paradise	Jimmy	
2012	Red Hook Summer	Deacon Zee	
2014	Da Sweet Blood of Jesus	Bishop Zee	
2015	Chi-Raq	Apollo	
2022	Freedom's Path	Abner	Posthumous release; Final film role

=== Television ===
Year	Title	Role	Notes
1992	In the Heat of the Night	Louis Arthur	Episode: "Random's Child"
1993	I'll Fly Away: Then and Now	Panhandler	TV movie
1997	Living Single	Mr. Leon	Episode: "Moonlight Savings Time"
1998	Mama Flora's Family	Flora's Pa	2 episodes
1999	Passing Glory		TV movie
2001	Boycott	Raymond Parks	TV movie
2004	Law & Order: Criminal Intent	Curtis Romney	Episode: "Mad Hops"
2005	Lackawanna Blues	Numb Finger Pete	TV movie
2017–19	She's Gotta Have It	Stokely Darling	10 episodes
2020	The Last O.G.	Jimmy	Episode: "Family Feud"

=== Theatre ===
Year	Title	Role	Notes
2001	Jitney	Fielding	
2003	Ma Rainey's Black Bottom	Toledo	Won Theatre World Award; Nominated for Tony Award for Best Featured Actor in a Play
2004	Good Boys	Thomas Thurman	
2004	Elmina's Kitchen	Digger	
2006	Crowns	Man	
2006	Gem of the Ocean	Solly Two Kings	
2007	Trouble in Mind	Sheldon Forrester	
2009	Death of a Salesman	Uncle Ben Loman	
2010	Ma Rainey's Black Bottom	Toledo	
2011	Trouble in Mind	Sheldon Forrester	
2012	Gleam	Logan Killicks / Sam Watson	

== Awards and nominations ==
Year	Award	Nominated work	Result	Notes
2003	Theatre World Award	Ma Rainey's Black Bottom	Won	
2003	Tony Award for Best Featured Actor in a Play	Ma Rainey's Black Bottom	Nominated	
