= Mars Blackmon =

- She's Gotta Have It character
- First appearance: She's Gotta Have It
- Created by: Spike Lee
- Portrayed by: Spike Lee (1986); Anthony Ramos (2017–2019)

In-universe information
- Gender: Male
- Significant other: Nola Darling
- Nationality: American

Mars Blackmon is a fictional character in the film She's Gotta Have It (1986), played by the film's writer/director, Spike Lee. In the film, he is a "Brooklyn-loving" fan of the New York Knicks, sports, and Air Jordans (the basketball shoes worn by Michael Jordan). This led to late 1980s and early 1990s appearances in Nike Air Jordan commercials alongside Jordan and Mars becoming well known for his use of the phrase, "It's gotta be da shoes." The ad campaign with Lee as Mars has been credited as a landmark in the evolution of sneakers into massively profitable items of fashion. When Lee was first approached to co-star with Michael Jordan for Nike, Lee thought the offer was a prank from his friends. The Jordan Mars shoe line is named in honor of the Mars Blackmon character, with Spike Lee's son, Jackson Lewis Lee, being the designer of the Jordan Mars 270.

In the April 30, 2010 episode of the genealogy television show Who Do You Think You Are? that focused on Spike Lee's search for his mother's ancestors, Lee said that he had called his grandmother to ask for a name for the character. His grandmother gave him the name "Mars". In the episode, Lee's research finds that Mars was the name of his great-great-grandfather (his grandmother's grandfather). In March 2015 a Capital One Quicksilver credit card television commercial features Samuel L. Jackson, Charles Barkley and Lee. During the commercial's hotel check-in, Lee uses the pseudonym Mars Blackmon to register his room.

Nike used the character for its Jordan Spiz'ike line of shoes.

For the 2017 Netflix comedy-drama series TV remake, Mars is played by Anthony Ramos. In episode #OhJudoKnow?, it is revealed that Mars' father is Mookie from Do the Right Thing, a character also portrayed by Spike Lee in the film from 1989.

== See also ==
- List of American advertising characters
