= Do the Right Thing =

1989 film by Spike Lee

- Theatrical release poster
- Directed by: Spike Lee
- Written by: Spike Lee
- Produced by: Spike Lee
- Starring: Danny Aiello; Ossie Davis; Ruby Dee; Richard Edson; Giancarlo Esposito; Spike Lee; Bill Nunn; John Turturro; John Savage
- Cinematography: Ernest Dickerson
- Edited by: Barry Alexander Brown
- Music by: Bill Lee
- Production company: 40 Acres and a Mule Filmworks
- Distributed by: Universal Pictures
- Release dates: May 19, 1989 (Cannes); June 30, 1989 (United States)
- Running time: 120 minutes
- Country: United States
- Language: English
- Budget: $6.2 million
- Box office: $37.3 million

Do the Right Thing is a 1989 American independent comedy-drama film produced, written and directed by Spike Lee. It features an ensemble cast that includes Lee, Danny Aiello, Ossie Davis, Ruby Dee, Richard Edson, Giancarlo Esposito, Bill Nunn, John Turturro and John Savage and is the feature film debut of Martin Lawrence and Rosie Perez. The story explores a Brooklyn neighborhood's simmering racial tension between its African-American residents and the Italian-American owners of a local pizzeria, culminating on a hot summer’s day.

Do the Right Thing premiered at the 42nd Cannes Film Festival on May 19, 1989, and was theatrically released in the United States by Universal Pictures on June 30. It was a major critical and commercial success, grossing $37.3 million worldwide against a production budget of $6.2 million. Blending elements of comedy, drama and social commentary, the film is noted for its vivid color design, stylized cinematography, direct-address monologues and an influential hip-hop-driven soundtrack, prominently featuring Public Enemy's "Fight the Power". Lee's direction combines heightened realism with theatrical and symbolic techniques to convey the psychological and emotional effects of heat, crowd dynamics and urban life. The film's ambiguous and controversial conclusion sparked widespread debate upon release regarding the nature of protest, responsibility and moral judgment.

The film earned nominations for Best Original Screenplay and Best Supporting Actor (Aiello) at the 62nd Academy Awards. It has since been widely recognized as one of the most important American films of the late 20th century; in 1999, it was selected for preservation in the United States National Film Registry by the Library of Congress as being "culturally, historically or aesthetically significant". In 2022, the film was ranked the 24th greatest of all time in Sight and Sound magazine's decennial poll of international critics, programmers, curators, archivists and academics. It has been featured on many other lists of the greatest films of all time by numerous critics. (Note: Attributed to multiple sources:)

== Plot ==
Twenty-five-year-old Mookie lives in Bedford–Stuyvesant, Brooklyn, with his sister Jade. He has a toddler son named Hector with his Latina girlfriend Tina, and works as a delivery man at a pizzeria owned by Italian-American Salvatore "Sal" Frangione. Sal's oldest son, Pino, is a racist who holds contempt for all the Black residents in the neighborhood. Sal's younger son, Vito, is friends with Mookie, which Pino feels undermines their fraternal bond.

Other residents of the neighborhood include friendly drunk Da Mayor, who dispenses unsolicited wisdom; Mother Sister, who observes the block from her brownstone; Radio Raheem, who blasts Public Enemy's "Fight the Power" on his boombox; Buggin' Out, a fast-talking young man who talks about Black civil rights to anyone who will listen; Smiley, a mentally disabled man who meanders around town with hand-colored pictures of Malcolm X and Martin Luther King Jr.; and a local DJ Mister Señor Love Daddy.

At Sal's, Buggin' Out questions Sal about his "Wall of Fame", which is decorated with photos of famous Italian-Americans. He demands that Sal put up pictures of Black celebrities since the pizzeria's customers are mostly Black. Sal refuses, feeling he has no obligation to put other photos on the wall, and ejects him. Buggin' Out attempts to start boycotting the pizzeria, but only Raheem and Smiley join him.

During the day, local teenagers open a fire hydrant to beat the heat wave before white police officers Mark Ponte and Gary Long intervene. Mookie confronts Pino about his contempt towards African Americans. Later, Pino expresses his hatred for African Americans to Sal, who insists on keeping the business in the majority African-American neighborhood.

That night, Buggin' Out, Smiley, and Raheem march into Sal's and demand that the Wall of Fame include Black celebrities. Sal demands that Raheem turn his boombox off, but he refuses. Buggin' Out badmouths Sal and threatens to shutter the pizzeria for good. The rest of the black customers join in the badmouthing after Sal uses the slur “nigger” (in retaliation for Buggin’ Out using the slur “guinea”). Finally, Sal snaps and destroys Raheem's boombox with a baseball bat. Enraged, Raheem attacks Sal. A fight ensues that spills out into the street, attracting a crowd, becoming so violent that the police arrive, including Long and Ponte. They break up the fight and apprehend Raheem and Buggin' Out. But as the officers attempt to restrain Raheem, Long begins choking him with his nightstick. Though Ponte and the onlookers plead for him to stop, Long tightens his choke-hold on Raheem, killing him. Attempting to save face, the officers hide his body in the back of a police car and drive off.

The onlookers blame Sal for Raheem's death, despite Da Mayor's unsuccessful attempts to defuse the situation. Suddenly, Mookie grabs a trash can and throws it through the pizzeria's window, sparking the crowd to trash it. Da Mayor pulls Sal, Pino, and Vito away from the mob, and Smiley burns the pizzeria down to the chants of the crowd which had gathered. The mob then turns toward the Korean market across the street to destroy it, too. Sonny, the owner, eventually dissuades the group with the help of Coconut Sid.

The police return with the fire department and riot patrols to extinguish the fire and disperse the crowd. The firefighters, after several warnings to the crowd, turn their hoses on the mob, enraging them, causing more violence and arrests. Da Mayor embraces Mother Sister as she wails over the chaos, while the main cast simply look on in a haze. Once the scene settles down, Smiley stumbles through the burnt out pizzeria, puts the photo of Martin Luther King Jr. and Malcolm X on the hall of fame, and grins.

The next day, Mookie returns to Sal and demands his weekly pay. After an argument, Sal pays Mookie, and the two amicably part. Mookie leaves to visit Hector as Mister Señor Love Daddy announces that the mayor of New York City has founded a committee to investigate the incident and dedicates a song to Raheem.

An epilogue shows two quotations that demonstrate the dichotomy of the film's theme—one from Martin Luther King, who claims violence is never justified, and one from Malcolm X, who claims violence is "intelligence" when used in self-defense—and dedicates the film to six Black people, five killed by police officers (Eleanor Bumpurs, Arthur Miller Jr., Edmund Perry, Yvonne Smallwood, and Michael Stewart) and one killed by a white mob (Michael Griffith).

== Cast ==
- Spike Lee as Mookie
- Danny Aiello as Sal Frangione
- Ossie Davis as Da Mayor
- Ruby Dee as Mother Sister
- Giancarlo Esposito as Buggin' Out
- Bill Nunn as Radio Raheem
- John Turturro as Pino Frangione
- Richard Edson as Vito Frangione
- Roger Guenveur Smith as Smiley
- Rosie Perez as Tina
- Joie Lee as Jade
- Steve White as Ahmad
- Martin Lawrence as Cee
- Leonard L. Thomas as Punchy
- Christa Rivers as Ella
- Robin Harris as Sweet Dick Willie
- Paul Benjamin as ML
- Frankie Faison as Coconut Sid
- Samuel L. Jackson as Mister Señor Love Daddy (credited as Sam Jackson)
- Steve Park as Sonny
- Rick Aiello as Officer Gary Long
- Miguel Sandoval as Officer Mark Ponte
- Richard Parnell Habersham as Eddie Lovell
- Luis Antonio Ramos as Stevie
- Frank Vincent as Charlie
- John Savage as Clifton

== Production ==
=== Development ===
Writer, director, and actor Spike Lee conceived the idea for Do the Right Thing after discussing a 1986 incident at Howard Beach, Queens, with actor Robert De Niro. This incident involved an attack on African-American men in a predominantly Italian-American neighborhood, resulting in one victim being struck by a car and killed. Lee was also influenced by the Alfred Hitchcock Presents episode "Shopping for Death," in which the main characters discuss their theory that hot weather increases violent tendencies, and the killing of Eleanor Bumpurs by police. He wrote the screenplay in two weeks.

The original script of Do the Right Thing ended with a stronger reconciliation between Mookie and Sal than Lee used in the film. In this version, Sal's comments to Mookie are similar to Da Mayor's earlier comments in the film and hint at some common ground and perhaps Sal's understanding of why Mookie tried to destroy his restaurant. Lee has not explicitly explained why he changed the ending but his contemporaneous notes compiled in the film's companion book indicate Lisa Jones expressed Sal's reaction as "too nice" as originally written.

=== Casting ===
Initially considering De Niro for the role of "Sal," Lee eventually cast Danny Aiello at De Niro's suggestion. Aiello's son Rick played Gary Long, the police officer who kills Radio Raheem. Roger Guenveur Smith, who was pestering Lee for a role in the film, created the character of Smiley, who was not in the original script. Four of the cast members were stand-up comedians: Martin Lawrence, Steve Park, Steve White and Robin Harris. Samuel L. Jackson was chosen for the role of Mister Señor Love Daddy. Jackson later revealed that he spent much of his time on set sleeping as he has no scenes outside. Lee originally wanted Bill Nunn to play the role of Mister Señor Love Daddy but later recast him as Radio Raheem. The acting couple Ossie Davis and Ruby Dee, who were friends of Lee's father Bill, were cast as Da Mayor and Mother Sister. Perez was cast as Mookie's love interest Tina after Lee saw her dancing at a Los Angeles dance club. Perez decided to take the part because her sister lived four blocks from the set. She had never been in a film before and became upset during the filming of Radio Raheem's death scene.

=== Filming ===
Principal photography commenced on July 18, 1988, on a single block in Brooklyn, New York. The film crew transformed the dilapidated Stuyvesant Avenue, between Quincy Street and Lexington Avenue in the Bedford–Stuyvesant neighborhood, creating new structures such as the Korean grocery store, a functional pizza parlor representing Sal's Famous Pizzeria, and a radio station replacing a burnt-out building. Some characters' residences were set in a former crack house shut down by the production, and the brownstone serving as the home of the only white resident, "Clifton," was a vacant building before filming. Lee organized a block party before principal photography to foster a positive relationship between the neighborhood residents and the filmmakers. Production designer Wynn Thomas altered the street's color scheme, using a great deal of red and orange paint to convey the sense of a heatwave. During filming, the neighborhood's crack dealers threatened the film crew for disturbing their business, leading Lee to hire Fruit of Islam members to provide security. Filming wrapped on September 14, 1988, with a budget of $6.2 million.

During the final confrontation between Danny Aiello's character, "Sal", and Giancarlo Esposito's character, "Buggin' Out", Lee allowed the actors to improvise racist remarks. Esposito, who is of half-Italian and half-African-American descent, found the scene cathartic.

=== Radio Raheem ===
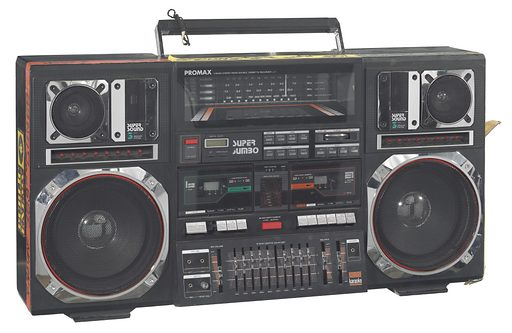
Radio Raheem's boombox as seen in Do the Right Thing. Image courtesy of Smithsonian National Museum of African American History and Culture.

The character of Radio Raheem (Nunn) was the subject of much analysis. In the film, Raheem recites a soliloquy on love and hate, an homage to a similar monologue delivered by Robert Mitchum in The Night of the Hunter (1955). In this scene, he is wearing brass knuckle rings that say "hate" on his left hand and "love" on his right. In this sequence, the camera replaces Mookie, opposite Raheem, so that he speaks directly to the camera and the audience. This cinematography frames Raheem's monologue as a moment of sincere commentary on Black history and the struggle against racism. Raheem articulates the allure of both love and hate and the constant fluctuation that occurs between these two opposing forces. In The Night of the Hunter, a serial killer masquerading as a preacher (Mitchum) speaks of love and hate as an internal struggle within oneself. Raheem's performance of the same topic, however, is portrayed as an external struggle against the outside world.

Critic Ted Kulczycky comments on Spike Lee's use of direct address in Radio Raheem's soliloquy as a "break from realism", thus creating an "atypical effect". Kulczycky cites the influence of Jean-Luc Godard's film Weekend. Kulczycky describes Raheem's direct address as having the dual effect of reminding viewers of the constructed nature of the film, but also "fueling their involvement." The boombox prop used in the film is on display in the A Changing America: 1968 and Beyond exhibit at the National Museum of African American History and Culture.

== Reception and legacy ==
=== Critical reception ===
The scene of characters with different ethnicities each speaking a monologue featuring insults targeting another ethnicity through racial stereotypes in long close-up shots, emphasizes racial prejudice at the time and from Lee's viewpoint.

At the time of the film's release, both Gene Siskel and Roger Ebert ranked the film as the best of 1989, and later each ranked it as one of the top 10 films of the decade (No. 6 for Siskel and No. 4 for Ebert). Siskel described the film as "a spiritual documentary that shows racial joy, hatred and confusion at every turn", while Ebert lauded it for coming "closer to reflecting the current state of race relations in America than any other movie of our time." Ebert later added the film to his list of The Great Movies. In a retrospective review in 2019, Kambole Campbell of the British magazine Little White Lies noted the film's lasting relevance and called it "a bold expression of love and frustration and care and anger that is so vivid and expressive it feels like it exists in the here and now." New York Times film critic Wesley Morris has called Do the Right Thing his favorite film.

Some critics were less favorable in their reviews. Dave Kehr of the Chicago Tribune gave the film two stars out of four; while calling the film "amiable", he resented it for employing white guilt and "seeing violence as a liberating symbol rather than a debasing reality." Ralph Novak, writing for People, panned the film as incoherent and having an unclear message and no likable characters: "If Lee is saying that racism is profoundly painful, frustrating and confusing, no one will argue. But this film states the case without offering any insight."

On Rotten Tomatoes, the film has a rating of 92%, based on 151 reviews, with an average rating of 9.1/10. The site's critical consensus reads, "Smart, vibrant and urgent without being didactic, Do the Right Thing is one of Spike Lee's most fully realized efforts – and one of the most important films of the 1980s." On Metacritic, the film has a score of 93 out of 100, based on 26 critics, indicating "universal acclaim", and placing it as the 68th-highest film of all-time on the site.

In 2006, Writers Guild of America West ranked the film's screenplay 93rd in WGA’s list of 101 Greatest Screenplays.

=== Controversies ===
After release, many reviewers protested its content. Some columnists opined that the film could incite black audiences to riot. Lee criticized white reviewers in turn for suggesting that black audiences were incapable of restraining themselves while watching a fictional motion picture. In a 2014 interview, Lee said, "That still bugs the shit out of me", calling the remarks "outrageous, egregious and, I think, racist." He said, "I don't remember people saying people were going to come out of theaters killing people after they watched Arnold Schwarzenegger films."

An open question near the end of the film is whether Mookie "does the right thing" by throwing the garbage can through the window, inciting the riot that destroys Sal's pizzeria. Some critics have interpreted Mookie's action as one that saves Sal's life by redirecting the crowd's anger away from Sal to his property, while others say that it was an "irresponsible encouragement to enact violence". The quotations by Martin Luther King, Jr. and Malcolm X used at the end of the film provide no answers: one advocates nonviolence, the other advocates armed self-defense in response to oppression.

Lee has remarked that only white viewers ask him if Mookie did the right thing; Black viewers do not ask him the question. Lee believes the key point is that Mookie was angry at the wrongful death of Radio Raheem, stating that viewers who question the riot are explicitly failing to see the difference between property damage and the death of a Black man.

Lee has been criticized for his treatment of women in his films. bell hooks said that he wrote Black women in the same objectifying way that white male filmmakers write the characters of white women. Rosie Perez, who made her acting debut as Tina in the film, later said that she was very uncomfortable with doing the nude scene in the film:

My first experience [with doing nude scenes] was Do the Right Thing. And I had a big problem with it, mainly because I was afraid of what my family would think—that's what was really bothering me. It wasn't really about taking off my clothes. But I also didn't feel good about it because the atmosphere wasn't correct. And when Spike Lee puts ice cubes on my nipples, the reason you don't see my head is because I'm crying. I was like, I don't want to do this.

Subsequently, Perez stated that Lee had offered an apology, and the two remained friends.

In June 2006, Entertainment Weekly placed Do the Right Thing at No. 22 on its list of The 25 Most Controversial Movies Ever.

In the 2021 Cannes Film Festival award ceremony, Chaz Ebert, the wife of the late film critic Roger Ebert, noted that her husband had been appalled that the film had not received any awards from the Cannes jury in 1989, and he had even threatened to boycott the festival as a result.

Drawing loud applause from attending press, Lee pointed to the continued relevance of the film's story, more than three decades on, saying: "You would think and hope that 30-something motherfucking years later that Black people would have stopped being hunted down like animals."

African-American avant-garde filmmaker Tony Cokes thought the juxtaposition of both the MLK and Malcolm X quotes was "muddle-headed politically" in the same way the riot started by Mookie was "absurd as an expression of/response to the things happening to people of color all over the NYC metro area during the period." He also criticized the narrative as "producing an uncannily heavy identification with Sal and sons pizza shop as 'victims' of 'irrational black violence' for many critics and white viewers" who ended up thinking that Radio Raheem deserved what he got from the police, and he said the film's construction misrepresented cases like Michael Stewart's.

It also topped the list of the Orlando Sentinel's overrated films of 1989 calling it "a tiresome combination of sitcom and message movie" that is "full of honest anger but expresses little else". The article also stated that:

It's hard to oppose a film that opposes racism without sounding racist – or at least racially biased – even if the film is superficial in its approach to the issue.

=== Awards and nominations ===
List of awards and nominations
| Award | Date of ceremony | Category | Recipients and nominees | Result |
|---|---|---|---|---|
| Academy Awards | March 26, 1990 | Best Supporting Actor | Danny Aiello | Nominated |
| Academy Awards | March 26, 1990 | Best Original Screenplay | Spike Lee | Nominated |
| Belgian Syndicate of Cinema Critics | 1990 | Grand Prix | | Nominated |
| Boston Society of Film Critics | 1990 | Best Supporting Actor | Danny Aiello | Won |
| Cannes Film Festival | May 23, 1989 | Palme d'Or | Spike Lee | Nominated |
| Chicago Film Critics Association | 1990 | Best Picture | | Won |
| Chicago Film Critics Association | 1990 | Best Director | Spike Lee | Won |
| Chicago Film Critics Association | 1990 | Best Supporting Actor | Danny Aiello | Won |
| Film Independent Spirit Awards | March 24, 1990 | Special Distinction Award | | Won |
| Golden Globe Awards | January 20, 1990 | Best Motion Picture – Drama | | Nominated |
| Golden Globe Awards | January 20, 1990 | Best Supporting Actor – Motion Picture | Danny Aiello | Nominated |
| Golden Globe Awards | January 20, 1990 | Best Director – Motion Picture | Spike Lee | Nominated |
| Golden Globe Awards | January 20, 1990 | Best Screenplay – Motion Picture | Spike Lee | Nominated |
| Los Angeles Film Critics Association | December 16, 1989 | Best Film | | Won |
| Los Angeles Film Critics Association | December 16, 1989 | Best Supporting Actor | Danny Aiello | Won |
| Los Angeles Film Critics Association | December 16, 1989 | Best Director | Spike Lee | Won |
| Los Angeles Film Critics Association | December 16, 1989 | Best Screenplay | Spike Lee | 2nd place |
| Los Angeles Film Critics Association | December 16, 1989 | Best Music | Bill Lee | Won |
| MTV Movie Awards | June 6, 2006 | Silver Bucket of Excellence | | Won |
| NAACP Image Awards | December 11, 1989 | Outstanding Actress | Ruby Dee | Won |
| NAACP Image Awards | December 11, 1989 | Outstanding Supporting Actor | Ossie Davis | Won |
| National Society of Film Critics Awards | January 8, 1990 | Best Director | Spike Lee | 3rd place |
| New York Film Critics Circle | January 14, 1990 | Best Film | | 5th place |
| New York Film Critics Circle | January 14, 1990 | Best Screenplay | Spike Lee | 4th place |
| New York Film Critics Circle | January 14, 1990 | Best Cinematography | Ernest Dickerson | Won |
| The 20/20 Awards | 2010 | Best Picture | | Nominated |
| The 20/20 Awards | 2010 | Best Director | Spike Lee | Won |
| The 20/20 Awards | 2010 | Best Supporting Actor | Danny Aiello | Nominated |
| The 20/20 Awards | 2010 | Best Supporting Actor | John Turturro | Nominated |
| The 20/20 Awards | 2010 | Best Original Screenplay | Spike Lee | Nominated |
| The 20/20 Awards | 2010 | Best Film Editing | Barry Alexander Brown | Won |
| The 20/20 Awards | 2010 | Best Original Song | "Fight the Power"; Music and Lyrics by Chuck D, Hank Shocklee, Eric Sadler, and Keith Shocklee | Won |

American Film Institute lists

- AFI's 100 Years...100 Songs:
  - "Fight the Power" – No. 40
- AFI's 100 Years...100 Movies (10th Anniversary Edition) – No. 96

== Home media ==
Do the Right Thing was released on VHS after its theatrical run, and on DVD by The Criterion Collection on February 20, 2001. It was released on Blu-ray by Universal Pictures on June 30, 2009, for its 20th anniversary. A special edition Blu-ray based on a 4K remaster of the film was released by Criterion on July 23, 2019, for the film's 30th anniversary. It was released on Ultra HD Blu-ray by Universal Pictures on February 2, 2021, based on the Criterion remaster.

== Soundtrack ==
The film's score (composed and partially performed by jazz musician Bill Lee, father of Spike Lee) was released in early July 1989 while the soundtrack was released in late June 1989 on Columbia Records and Motown Records, respectively. The soundtrack was successful, reaching the number eleven spot on the Top R&B/Hip-Hop Albums chart, and peaking at sixty-eight on the Billboard 200.

On the Hot R&B/Hip-Hop Singles & Tracks chart, the Perri track "Feel So Good" reached the fifty-first spot, while Public Enemy's "Fight the Power" reached number twenty, and Guy's "My Fantasy" went all the way to the top spot. "My Fantasy" also reached number six on the Hot Dance Music/Maxi-Singles Sales chart, and sixty-two on the Billboard Hot 100. "Fight the Power" also charted high on the Hot Dance Music chart, peaking at number three, and topped the Hot Rap Singles chart.

Do the Right Thing: Original Motion Picture Score

Film score by Bill Lee
- Released: 1989
- Recorded: December 12, 1988 – December 16, 1988
- Genre: Film score
- Length: 35:36
- Label: Columbia
- Producer: Spike Lee (exec.)

=== Track listing ===
Do the Right Thing: Original Motion Picture Soundtrack

Soundtrack album by Various artists
- Released: June 23, 1989
- Genre: Soundtrack
- Length: 53:14
- Label: Motown Records
- Producers: Gregory "Sugar Bear" Elliott (exec.), Ted Hopkins (exec.), Mark Kibble (exec.), Spike Lee (exec.), Johnny Mercer (exec.)

Singles from Do the Right Thing: Original Motion Picture Soundtrack
- 1. "Fight the Power" Released: July 4, 1989

| No. | Title | Writer(s) | Producer(s) | Length |
|---|---|---|---|---|
| 1. | "Fight the Power" | Shocklee, Ryder, Sadler | Hank Shocklee, Carl Ryder, Eric Sadler | 5:23 |
| 2. | "My Fantasy" | Riley, Griffin | Teddy Riley, Gene Griffin | 4:57 |
| 3. | "Party Hearty" | House, Wood | Kent Wood, JuJu House | 4:43 |
| 4. | "Can't Stand It" | Hinds | David R. Hinds, Sidney Mills | 5:06 |
| 5. | "Why Don't We Try?" | Jones, DeCarmine, Morris | Vincent Edward Morris, Raymond Jones, Larry DeCarmine | 3:35 |
| 6. | "Feel So Good" | McKinney, Lorri Perry, Michael O'Hara | Paul Laurence, Jones | 5:39 |
| 7. | "Don't Shoot Me" | Lee, Warren, Claude McKnight, David Thomas | Mervyn E. Warren | 4:08 |
| 8. | "Hard to Say" | Jones | Laurence | 3:21 |
| 9. | "Prove to Me" | Jones, McKinney | Jones, Sami McKinney | 5:24 |
| 10. | "Never Explain Love" (End credits theme) | Cathy Block, Jones | Jones | 5:58 |
| 11. | "Tu y Yo/We Love [Jingle]" | | Blades | 5:12 |

== In popular culture ==
In 1990, the film was parodied in a sketch on In Living Color. Many television series have parodied the trash can scene, including The Critic, The Boondocks, and Bob's Burgers.

The scene in which Buggin' Out confronts the white Celtics fan about scuffing his Air Jordans is parodied in the music video for the 2008 Nelly song "Stepped on My J'z".

In 2016, Air Jordan released a special Radio Raheem sneaker.

In 2014, the film's 25th anniversary, Barack and Michelle Obama praised the film, and said they went to see it together on their first date. This was later referenced in the 2016 film Southside with You in which Barack discusses Mookie's motives with a white colleague after seeing the film.

On the animated series The Critic, Jay Sherman reviews a parody in which Mookie throws a garbage can through the window, and Sal thanks him for finding his stolen garbage can.

== Do the Right Thing Way ==
The section of Stuyvesant Avenue between Quincy Street and Lexington Avenue in the Bedford–Stuyvesant neighborhood of Brooklyn, where the entire film was shot, was renamed Do the Right Thing Way in 2015. The renaming came from a push by Bed-Stuy's city council representative Robert Cornegy Jr. and was included as part of a bill to honor important figures from New York City's history. The renaming was meant to occur in 2014, but was delayed by the city. The street is the only street in New York City named after a work of fiction, and one of the only streets named after a work of fiction in the world. Lee was reportedly “excited” by the renaming, and has also begun selling faux street signs for the street on his website.

== Related films ==
Rick Aiello and Miguel Sandoval reprise their roles as officers Gary Long and Mark Ponte, respectively, in Lee's 1991 film Jungle Fever. Mookie (reprised by Lee) makes another appearance in Lee's 2012 film Red Hook Summer, in which he is shown delivering pizzas. According to Lee, Sal took the insurance money from his burned pizzeria and reopened the restaurant in Red Hook. He then rehired Mookie, agreeing to include Black celebrities on his Wall of Fame.

Perez returns as Tina in the second season of Lee's Netflix series She's Gotta Have It (2017–2019), based on the film of the same name; it is revealed that not only is she the mother of Mars Blackmon (Anthony Ramos), but that Mookie is Blackmon's biological father.

== See also ==
- List of hood films

== Bibliography ==
- Katz, Mark (2004). Capturing Sound: How Technology Has Changed Music. University of California Press. ISBN 0-520-24380-3.
- Aftab, Kaleem. Spike Lee: That's My Story and I'm Sticking to It. England: Faber and Faber Limited, 2005. ISBN 0-39306153-1.
- Spike Lee's Last Word. Documentary on the Criterion Collection DVD of Do the Right Thing. 2000.
- Spike Lee et al. Commentary on the Criterion Collection DVD of Do the Right Thing. 2000.
- Mark A. Reid (1997). Spike Lee's Do the right thing. Cambridge University Press. ISBN 978-0-521-55954-6.
- Myrie, Russell (2008). Don't Rhyme for the Sake of Riddlin': The Authorised Story of Public Enemy. Canongate. ISBN 978-1-84767-056-4.
