= Cronies =

- Film poster
- Directed by: Michael Larnell
- Written by: Michael Larnell
- Produced by: Michael Larnell
- Starring: Michael Larnell
- Cinematography: Federico Cesca
- Edited by: Michael Larnell
- Production companies: 40 Acres & A Mule Filmworks; Circa 1978 Productions
- Release date: January 25, 2015 (Sundance)
- Running time: 86 minutes
- Country: United States
- Language: English

Cronies is a 2015 American comedy-drama film written by, directed by and starring Michael Larnell. Spike Lee served as an executive producer of the film.

== Cast ==
- George Sample III as Louis
- Zurich Buckner as Jack
- Brian Kowalski as Andrew
- Landra Taylor as Nikki
- Samiyah Womack as Aisha
- Elinor Nelson as Juanita
- Homer Simmons as Suede
- Michael Larnell as Interviewer / Radio Host

== Reception ==
The film has a 67% rating on Rotten Tomatoes.
