= 40 Acres and a Mule Filmworks =

Spike Lee production company

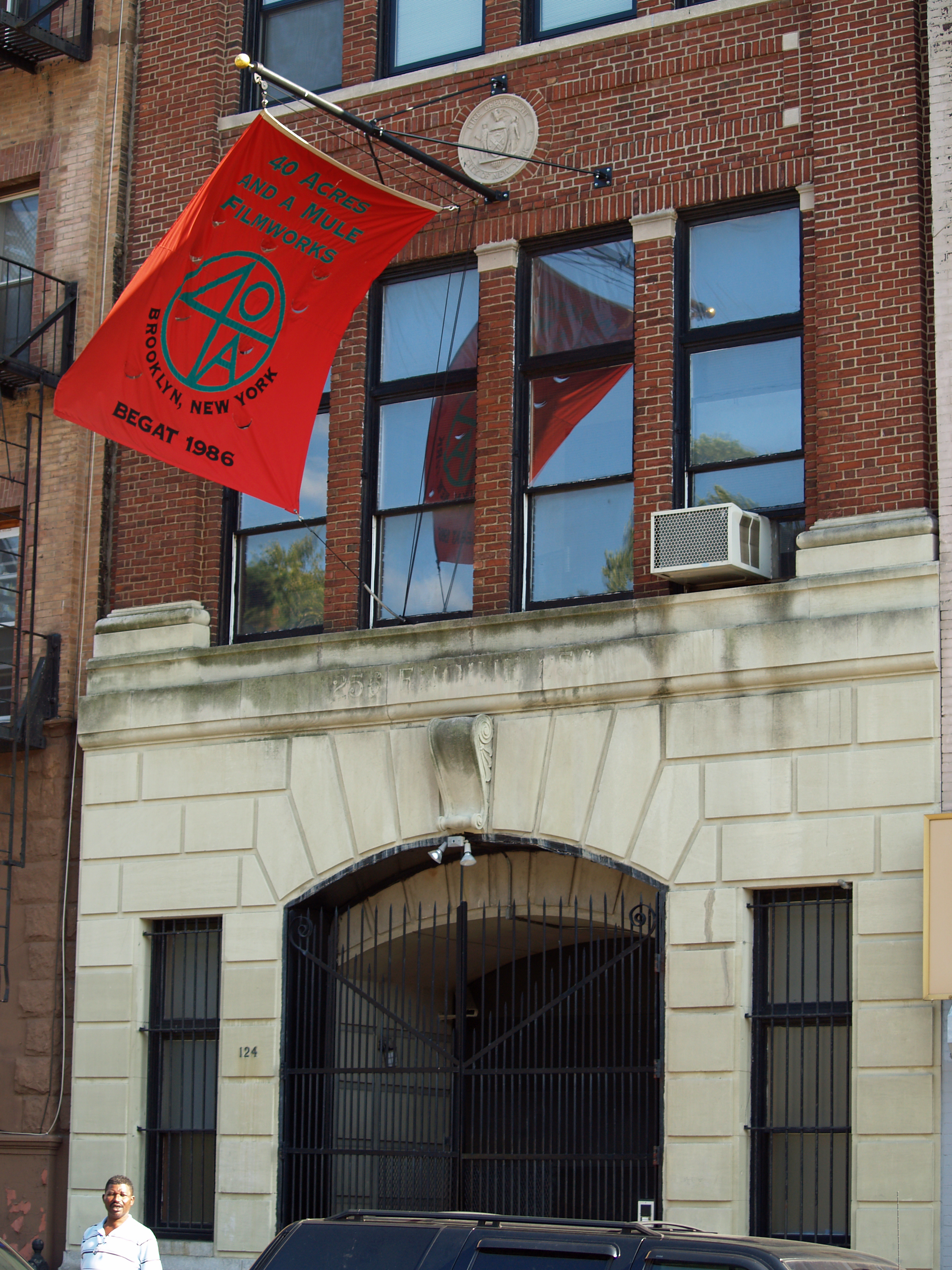
- 40 Acres and a Mule Filmworks building
- Industry: Film; Television
- Founded: 1979; 47 years ago
- Founders: Spike Lee; Monty Ross
- Headquarters: New York City
- Area served: Worldwide
- Subsidiaries: 40 Acres and a Mule Musicworks; Spike DDB
- Website: 40acres.com

40 Acres and a Mule Filmworks, sometimes shortened to 40 Acres, is an American production company founded by filmmakers Spike Lee and Monty Ross in 1979. It has produced all of Lee's films.

== History ==
The company's name is a reference to forty acres and a mule, a section of military orders during the American Civil War which stated that certain recently emancipated black families on the Georgia coast were to be given some surplus army mules and lots of land no larger than 40 acres (160,000 m^{2}). The company's logo contains a circle with the icon "40a" and it has occasionally used a parody of/homage to the Mark VII Limited logo.

The company has produced all of Lee's films, starting in 1986 with She's Gotta Have It. After the success of his films Do the Right Thing and Malcolm X, Lee expanded the company's brand by opening clothing stores featuring its merchandise.

40 Acres and a Mule Filmworks has an advertising division with DDB called Spike DDB located in New York City. They have done Super Bowl, Nike, Levi, and Eckō Unltd. commercial spots. They have produced commercials and music videos in addition to Lee's films. The company established a music branch, used to designate records, 40 Acres and a Mule Musicworks in 1993.

In the late 1980s, the company sought a partnership with Universal Pictures, which was reupped in September 1992, and stayed on for five years, which lasted until March 2, 1997, when it was moved to Columbia Pictures for a three-year deal. Sam Kitt was named president of production at the Sony-based studio on June 18, 1997.

In 2001, Lee's TV film A Huey P. Newton Story won a Peabody Award. In 2006, documentary series When the Levees Broke: A Requiem in Four Acts won a Peabody Award. In 2008, the company moved its operations from DeKalb Avenue, where it had been since the mid-1980s, due to skyrocketing rent. The headquarters moved "around the corner" to a building on South Elliott Place still in the Fort Greene neighborhood of Brooklyn. In 2010, Lee's documentary If God Is Willing and Da Creek Don't Rise won a Peabody Award. In 2021, the company had signed a multi-year creative partnership with Netflix to develop their film and television projects.

== Filmography ==
=== Film ===
Date	Title	Director	Co-producer	Distributor
August 8, 1986	She's Gotta Have It	Spike Lee		Island Pictures
February 12, 1988	School Daze	Spike Lee		Columbia Pictures
July 21, 1989	Do the Right Thing	Spike Lee		Universal Pictures
August 3, 1990	Mo' Better Blues	Spike Lee		Universal Pictures
June 7, 1991	Jungle Fever	Spike Lee		Universal Pictures
November 18, 1992	Malcolm X	Spike Lee		Warner Bros. (United States); Largo International (International)
May 13, 1994	Crooklyn	Spike Lee		Universal Pictures
October 28, 1994	Drop Squad	David C. Johnson		Gramercy Pictures
April 19, 1995	New Jersey Drive	Nick Gomez		Gramercy Pictures
May 24, 1995	Tales from the Hood	Rusty Cundieff		Savoy Pictures
September 13, 1995	Clockers	Spike Lee		Universal Pictures
March 22, 1996	Girl 6	Spike Lee	Fox Searchlight Pictures	Fox Searchlight Pictures
October 16, 1996	Get on the Bus	Spike Lee	Columbia Pictures	Sony Pictures Releasing
May 1, 1998	He Got Game	Spike Lee	Touchstone Pictures	Buena Vista Pictures
July 2, 1999	Summer of Sam	Spike Lee	Touchstone Pictures	Buena Vista Pictures
October 22, 1999	The Best Man	Malcolm D. Lee		Universal Pictures
April 21, 2000	Love & Basketball	Gina Prince-Bythewood		New Line Cinema
August 18, 2000	The Original Kings of Comedy	Spike Lee	MTV Productions; Latham Entertainment	Paramount Pictures
October 6, 2000	Bamboozled	Spike Lee		New Line Cinema
July 1, 2001	3 A.M.	Lee Davis		Prism Leisure Corporation
December 19, 2002	25th Hour	Spike Lee	Touchstone Pictures; 25th Hour Productions; Gamut Films; Industry Entertainment	Buena Vista Pictures
July 30, 2004	She Hate Me	Spike Lee		Sony Pictures Classics
March 24, 2006	Inside Man	Spike Lee	Universal Pictures; Imagine Entertainment	Universal Pictures
September 26, 2008	Miracle at St. Anna	Spike Lee	Touchstone Pictures; Rai Cinema; On My Own Produzioni Cinematografiche	Walt Disney Studios Motion Pictures
August 10, 2012	Red Hook Summer	Spike Lee		Variance Films
November 27, 2013	Oldboy	Spike Lee	Good Universe; Vertigo Entertainment	FilmDistrict
January 25, 2015	Cronies	Michael Larnell	Circa 1978 Productions	
February 14, 2015	Da Sweet Blood of Jesus	Spike Lee		Gravitas Ventures
December 4, 2015	Chi-Raq	Spike Lee	Amazon Studios	Roadside Attractions
February 5, 2016	Michael Jackson's Journey from Motown to Off the Wall	Spike Lee	Optimum Productions Sony Legacy	Showtime
April 20, 2018	Pass Over	Spike Lee		Amazon Prime
August 10, 2018	BlacKkKlansman	Spike Lee	Blumhouse Productions; Monkeypaw Productions; QC Entertainment; Legendary Entertainment; Perfect World Pictures	Focus Features (United States); Universal Pictures (International)
October 2, 2018	Tales from the Hood 2	Rusty Cundieff; Darin Scott	Universal 1440 Entertainment; Hood Productions, Inc.	Universal Pictures Home Entertainment
May 17, 2019	See You Yesterday	Stefon Bristol		Netflix
June 12, 2020	Da 5 Bloods	Spike Lee	Rahway Road; Lloyd Levin/Beatriz Levin Production	Netflix
October 6, 2020	Tales from the Hood 3	Rusty Cundieff; Darin Scott	Universal 1440 Entertainment	Universal Pictures Home Entertainment
October 17, 2020	American Utopia	Spike Lee	HBO Films; Participant; River Road Entertainment; Warner Music Entertainment; RadicalMedia; Todomundo	HBO (United States/Canada); Universal Pictures (International)
August 15, 2025	Highest 2 Lowest	Spike Lee	Escape Artists; Mandalay Pictures	A24; Apple Studios

=== Television ===
- A Huey P. Newton Story (2001)
- Good Fences (2003)
- When the Levees Broke (2006)
- Kobe Doin' Work (2009)
- If God Is Willing and da Creek Don't Rise (2010)
- She's Gotta Have It (2017–19)
- NYC Epicenters 9/11-2021½ (2021)
- Katrina: Come Hell and High Water (2025)
