= GBM Nutron =

Trinidadian musician

- Birth name: GBM Nutron
- Origin: Trinidad and Tobago
- Genres: Soca
- Occupations: Singer, Songwriter, Producer
- Instruments: Vocals

GBM Nutron, also known as Jason Carter, is a Trinidadian soca singer, songwriter and producer.

== Background ==
Jason Carter was born and raised in the twin island state of Trinidad and Tobago. His father Ancil "Perez" Ford produced soca artists such as Carl and Carol Jacobs and Crazy while also being a member of soca bands Shandileer and Sound Revolution. At the age of ten, Nutron's family moved to New York where he eventually became a songwriter and producer in his own right. He first worked with Kevin Lyttle then joined Machel Montano's band as its programmer. At this juncture he started producing hit singles for artists like Montano, Shal Marshall, Destra, Kes and Ravi B.

In 2017 Nutron released his debut album entitled Calypso: The Unsung Legacy, which peaked at No. 11 on the US Billboard Top Reggae Albums chart. A song from the album called Scene also appeared in episode four of the Netflix tv series She's Gotta Have It.
