= Anthony Ramos =

American actor and singer (born 1991)

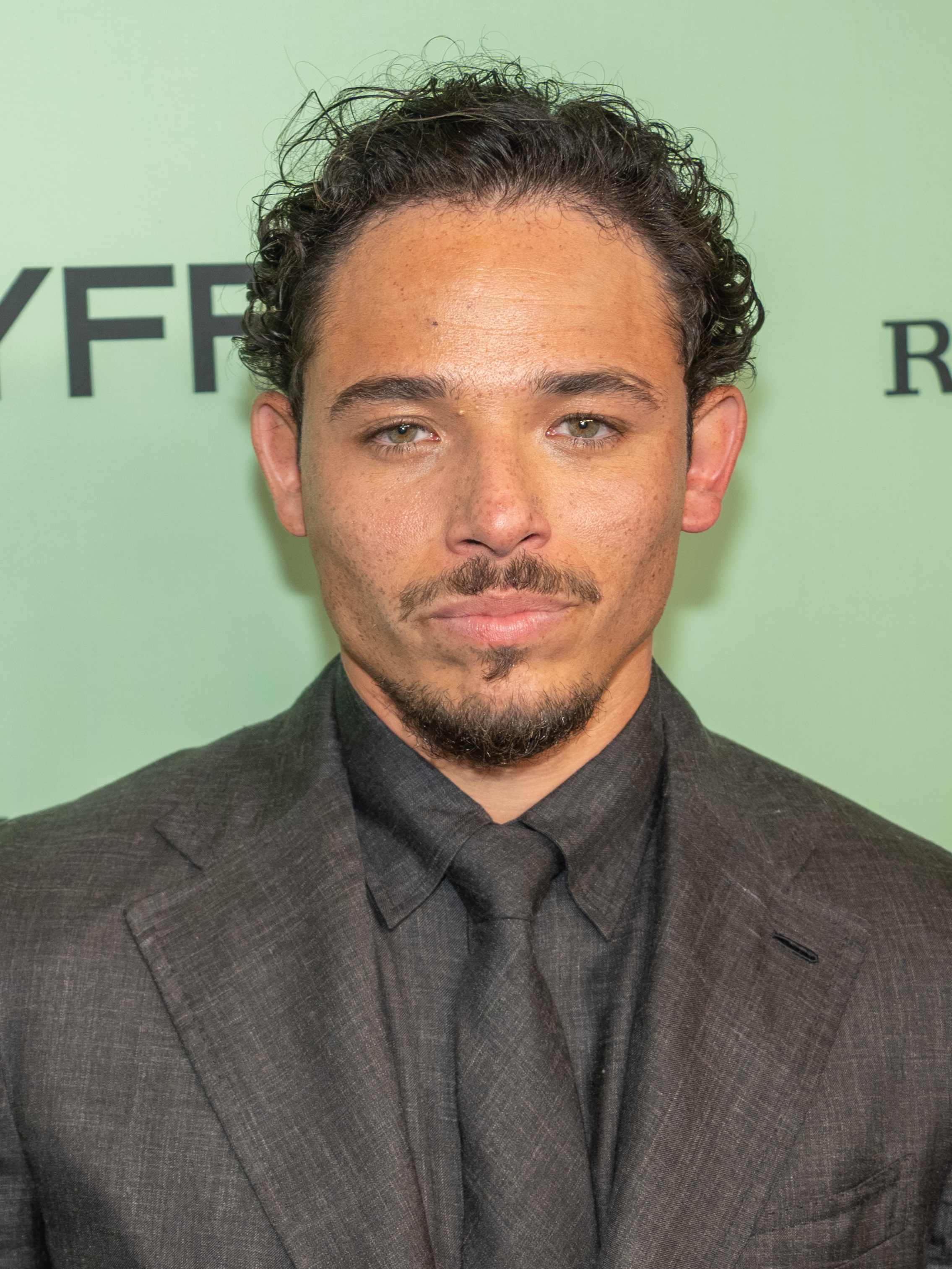
- Ramos in 2025
- Born: Anthony Paul Ramos Martinez; November 1, 1991 (age 35); New York City, U.S.
- Education: American Musical and Dramatic Academy
- Occupations: Actor; singer
- Years active: 2010–present

Anthony Paul Ramos Martinez (born November 1, 1991) is an American actor and singer. After graduating in musical theater from the American Musical and Dramatic Academy, Ramos began performing in stage musicals. In 2015, he originated the dual role of John Laurens and Philip Hamilton in the musical Hamilton, for which he won a Grammy Award. He received a nomination for the Primetime Emmy Award for Outstanding Actor in a Supporting Role in a Limited Series or Movie for his performance in the 2020 stage recording.

Ramos played a supporting role in A Star Is Born (2018), and starred in the musical film In the Heights (2021), earning him a nomination for the Golden Globe Award for Best Actor – Motion Picture Musical or Comedy, the action film Transformers: Rise of the Beasts (2023), and the disaster film Twisters (2024). Ramos has also voiced roles in the DreamWorks Animation films such as King Trollex in Trolls World Tour (2020) and Mr. Piranha in the crime comedy film The Bad Guys franchise (2022–present); the latter of which landed him a nomination for the Black Reel Award for Outstanding Voice Performance.

== Early life and education ==
Ramos was born Anthony Paul Ramos Martinez on November 1, 1991. He grew up in Bushwick, Brooklyn. His family is Puerto Rican, of African, indigenous, and European descent. On a 2024 episode of Finding Your Roots, he discovered that a portion of his heritage traces back to the Canary Islands and his 16th great-grandfather was Pelinor (d. 1505), an indigenous Guanche king of the island of Tenerife, the largest island in the Canaries.

Ramos lived in Hope Gardens Apartments, an affordable housing complex in Bushwick, Brooklyn with his mother, older brother, and younger sister. Anthony's father struggled with substance abuse and was only present in his life occasionally.

Anthony Ramos attended Halsey Junior High School in Brooklyn, New York City, where he sang Motown songs at school assemblies in a student group called the Halsey Trio. He is a 2009 graduate of New Utrecht High School in Brooklyn. His ambitions at the time centered around baseball, including plans to play NCAA Division III college baseball, followed by a baseball coaching career. After high school, he attended the American Musical and Dramatic Academy on the Upper West Side of Manhattan, New York a conservatory for the performing arts, on a full scholarship from the Seinfeld Scholarship, run by Jerry Seinfeld. He graduated from the musical theater program in 2011.

== Acting career ==
Beginning in 2011, Ramos earned roles in a variety of regional and touring musical productions, including Usnavi de la Vega in a 2012 production of In the Heights. In 2014, he performed in Heart and Lights at Radio City Music Hall, a dance show with the Rockettes which was canceled during previews. During rehearsals for Heart and Lights, Ramos auditioned for the off-Broadway production of Hamilton at The Public Theater. After being cast in Hamilton, Ramos played Justin Laboy in Lin-Manuel Miranda's short musical 21 Chump Street, a 14-minute, one-time performance on June 7, 2014, which was recorded for This American Life.

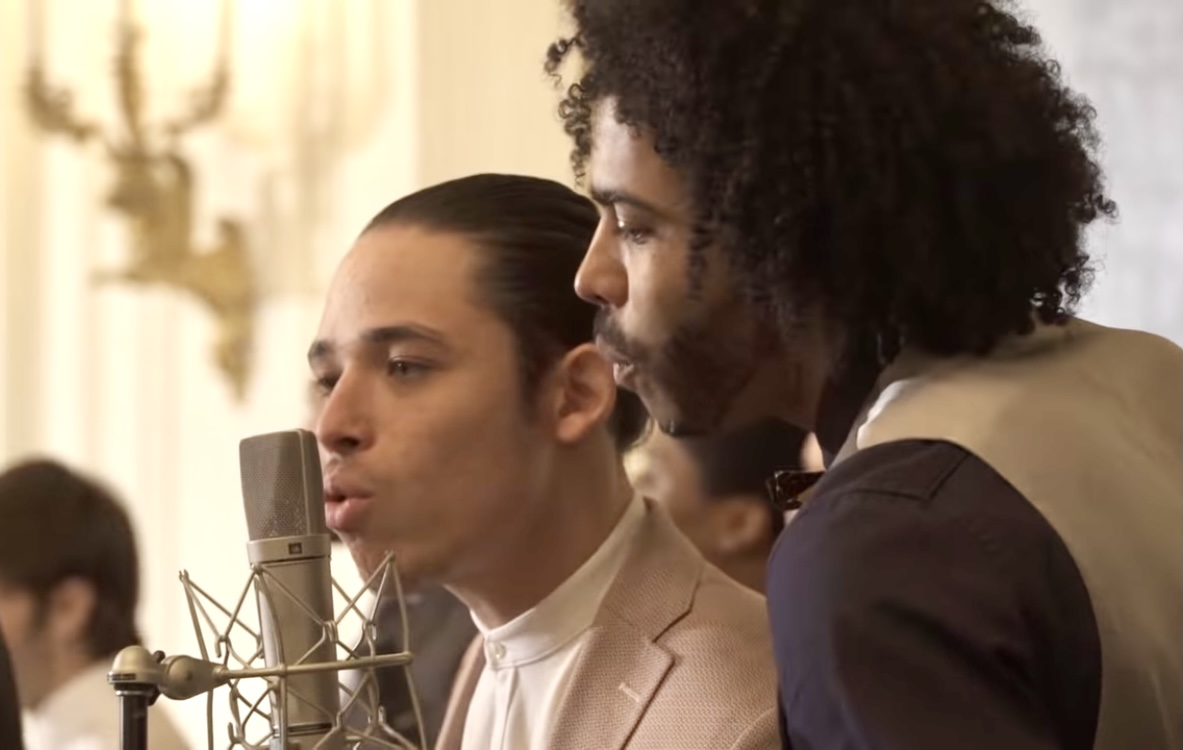
Ramos (left) and Daveed Diggs perform with Hamilton castmates at the White House, March 2016

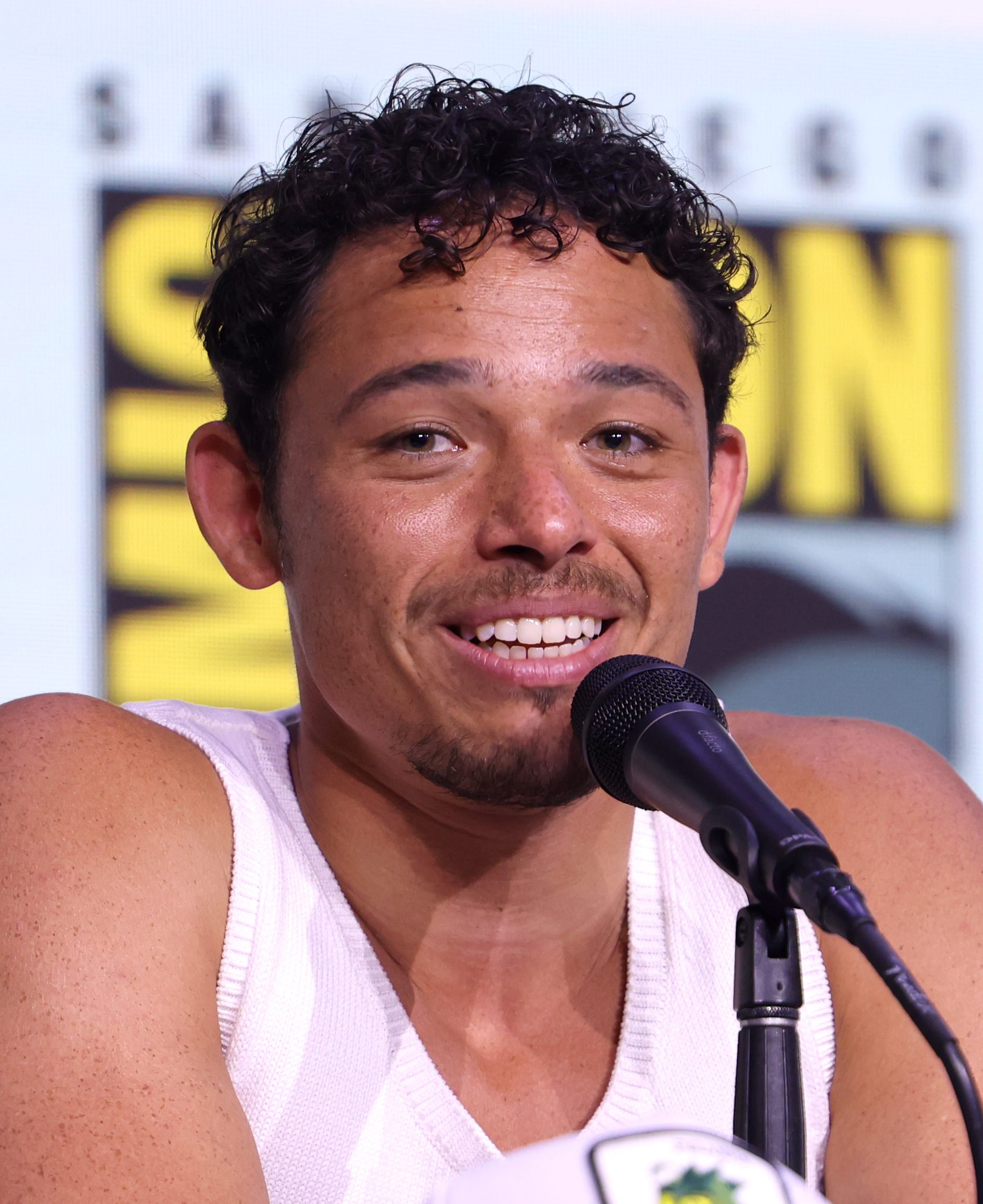
Ramos at the 2025 San Diego Comic-Con

Hamilton opened off-Broadway in early 2015, with Ramos originating the dual role of John Laurens and Philip Hamilton, the oldest son of Alexander Hamilton. The musical moved to Broadway on July 13, 2015, in previews, and opened on August 6, 2015. Ramos left the production on November 20, 2016, being replaced by Jordan Fisher.

In September 2016, it was announced that Ramos had been cast in director Spike Lee's Netflix comedy-drama series She's Gotta Have It, in the role of Mars Blackmon. Ramos played the role of Ramon in the 2018 remake of A Star Is Born, starring Lady Gaga and Bradley Cooper, and directed by Cooper. In 2018, Variety reported that Ramos had been cast as Usnavi de la Vega in the film adaptation of In the Heights. The movie was released in 2021 to significant acclaim, but was a box-office bomb. In April 2021, Ramos was cast in the lead role in the next installment of the Transformers film franchise, Transformers: Rise of the Beasts. The film was released on June 9, 2023.

In February 2022, Ramos was cast as Parker Robbins / The Hood in the superhero streaming series Ironheart, set in the Marvel Cinematic Universe. In January 2024, Ramos was cast as the lead voice role in a Bob the Builder animated film. In July 2024, Ramos appeared in Twisters, the sequel to the 1996 film Twister.

== Recording career ==
Ramos appeared on the original Broadway cast recording of Hamilton in 2015, in the dual roles of John Laurens and Philip Hamilton. He reunited with Lin-Manuel Miranda in October 2017 as one of the vocalists on Miranda's song "Almost Like Praying," a release to benefit Hurricane Maria victims.

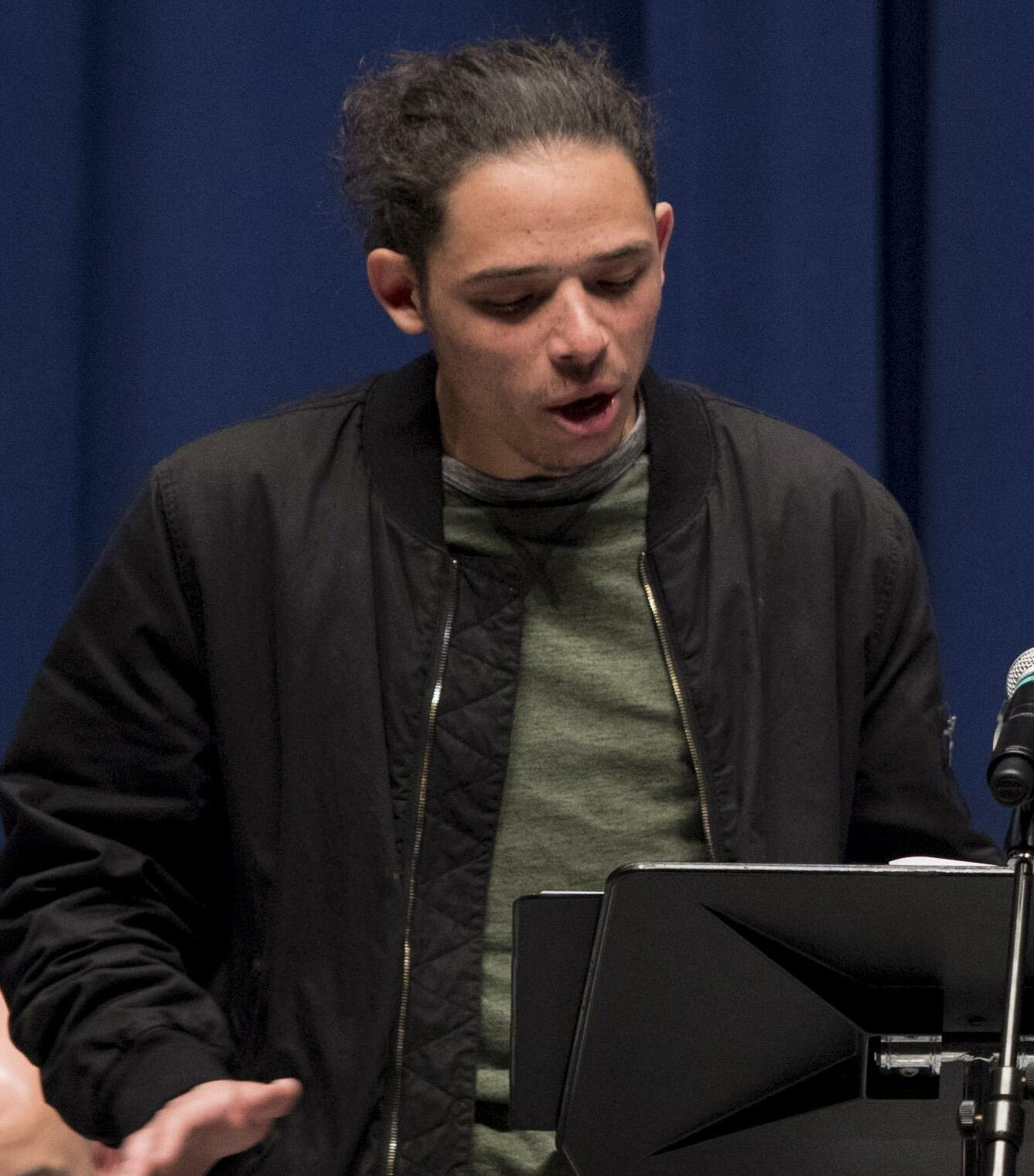
Ramos acting with actor Andre Royo (out of frame) in an Arts in the Armed Forces performance in Yokota Air Base in Japan, March 2017

On November 8, 2017, two tracks, "Freedom" and "Common Ground", from his first solo EP, titled The Freedom EP, were released. The release was produced by Will Wells, who had previously worked with Logic and Pentatonix. The Freedom EP was released on January 20, 2018. In addition to the previously released singles, the EP included two new songs, "When The Bell Tolls" and "PRayer" [sic].

On June 13, 2019, it was announced that Ramos had signed to Republic Records. The signing was documented on his YouTube series, It Takes A Village, where he revealed that new music would be released that summer. His debut album, The Good & The Bad, was released in the autumn on October 25, 2019. Although it did not chart on the US Billboard Top 200 album chart, it did debut at number 21 on the Billboard Heatseekers Albums chart.

On June 25, 2021, Republic released his second album, Love and Lies. The album debuted and peaked for one week at number 36 on the Billboard Top 200 album chart.

== Personal life ==
In 2014, Ramos met actress Jasmine Cephas Jones during rehearsals for the off-Broadway production of Hamilton. He confirmed their relationship in February 2015, and on Christmas Eve 2018, he proposed to Jones in front of her favorite castle in Arundel, England. In November 2021, they ended their engagement before officially splitting.

In February 2024, Ramos' family was featured on episode 104 ("Mean Streets") of the PBS television show Finding Your Roots, a program about genealogy.

== Filmography ==
Key
†	Denotes films that have not yet been released

=== Film ===
Year	Title	Role	Notes
2016	White Girl	Kilo	
2016	10 Crosby	Younger Doorman	Short film
2017	Patti Cake$	Recording Engineer	
2018	Monsters and Men	Manny Ortega	
2018	Summer Days, Summer Nights	Frankie	
2018	A Star Is Born	Ramon	
2019	Godzilla: King of the Monsters	Staff Sergeant Anthony Martinez	
2020	Trolls World Tour	King Trollex (voice)	
2020	Hamilton	John Laurens / Philip Hamilton	Filmed recording of 2016 Broadway musical
2020	Honest Thief	Agent Ramon Hall	
2021	In the Heights	Usnavi de la Vega	
2022	The Bad Guys	Mr. Piranha (voice)	
2023	Transformers: Rise of the Beasts	Noah Diaz	
2023	Dumb Money	Marcus	
2024	Long Distance	Andy Ramirez	
2024	Twisters	Javi	
2025	Highest 2 Lowest	Himself	Cameo
2025	The Bad Guys 2	Mr. Piranha (voice)	
2025	A House of Dynamite	Major Daniel Gonzalez	
2026	Love Language	Dash	
TBA	Kaet Might Die		Post-production

=== Television ===
Year	Title	Role	Notes
2015	Younger	Julio	Episodes: “Liza Sows Her Oates”, “IRL”
2016	Law & Order: Special Victims Unit	Juan Flores	Episode: "Forty-One Witnesses"
2017–2018	Will & Grace	Tony	4 episodes
2017–2019	She's Gotta Have It	Mars Blackmon	19 episodes
2019	Elena of Avalor	Tito (voice)	Episode: "Team Isa"
2021	In Treatment	Eladio Restrepo	6 episodes
2021	Blindspotting	Yorkie	2 episodes
2021	Trolls: Holiday in Harmony	King Trollex (voice)	TV special
2024	Finding Your Roots	Himself	Episode: "Mean Streets"
2025	Ironheart	Parker Robbins / The Hood	Disney+ miniseries; 6 episodes
2026	The Beauty	The Assassin	11 episodes
2026	The Shards	Tony Cruz	1 episode

=== Theatre ===
Year	Production	Role	Location	Notes
2011	Grease	Sonny LaTierri	Surflight Theatre; June 22 – July 15, 2011	Regional
2012	Damn Yankees	Henry / Ensemble	Various	National tour
2012	In the Heights	Sonny de la Vega u/s Usnavi de la Vega	Pioneer Theatre Company; September 14 – 29, 2012	Regional
2014	Hamilton	John Laurens / Philip Hamilton	The 52nd Street Project; May 2014	Workshop
2014	21 Chump Street	Justin Laboy	Brooklyn Academy of Music; June 7, 2014	Regional
2015	Alice by Heart	Caterpillar / Angus / Knave of Hearts	MCC Theater; December 2015	Workshop
2015–2016	Hamilton	John Laurens / Philip Hamilton	The Public Theater; January 20 – May 3, 2015	Off-Broadway
2015–2016	Hamilton	John Laurens / Philip Hamilton	Richard Rodgers Theater; July 13, 2015 – November 20, 2016	Broadway
2018	In the Heights	Usnavi de la Vega	John F. Kennedy Center for the Performing Arts, Washington, DC; March 21–25, 2018	Regional
TBA	Amadeus †	Mozart	TBA	Broadway

== Discography ==
=== Studio albums ===
List of studio albums, with selected information
Title	Details
The Good & the Bad	Release date: October 25, 2019; Label: Republic; Formats: CD, digital download, streaming
Love and Lies	Release date: June 25, 2021; Label: Republic; Formats: CD, digital download, streaming

=== Extended plays ===
List of extended plays, with selected information
Title	Details
The Freedom EP	Release date: January 28, 2018; Label: Whole Team Winnin'; Formats: CD, digital download, streaming

=== Soundtrack and cast albums ===
List of soundtrack albums, with selected information
Title	Details	Peak chart positions			
Title	Details	US	AUS	CAN	UK
21 Chump Street: The Musical	Release date: June 19, 2014; Label: 5000 Broadway Productions; Formats: CD, digital download	—	—	—	—
Hamilton (Original Broadway Cast Recording)	Release date: September 25, 2015; Label: Hamilton Uptown; Formats: CD, digital download	2	6	2	58
Trolls World Tour (Original Motion Picture Soundtrack)	Release date: March 13, 2020; Label: RCA; Formats: CD, digital download, streaming	15	66	33	—
In The Heights (Original Motion Picture Soundtrack)	Release date: June 10, 2021; Label: Atlantic Records/WaterTower Music; Formats: CD, digital download, streaming	45	59	—	—

=== Singles ===
List of singles, with selected information
Title	Year	Album
"Cry Today, Smile Tomorrow"	2019	Non-album single
"Dear Diary"	2019	The Good & the Bad
"The Good & the Bad"	2019	The Good & the Bad
"Mind Over Matter"	2019	The Good & the Bad
"Figure It Out"	2019	The Good & the Bad
"Relationship"	2020	The Good & the Bad
"Stop"	2020	Non-album single
"If You Want Me to Stay" (Sly and the Family Stone cover) (with Ari Lennox)	2020	Non-album single
"Say Less"	2021	Love and Lies
"Blessings"	2021	Love and Lies
"Échale"	2021	Love and Lies
"Lose My Mind"	2021	Love and Lies
"Good Time"	2022	Non-album single
"Échale (Eydren Remix)"	2022	Non-album single
"Villano"	2023	TBA
"Se Fue"	2023	TBA
"Vicariously"	2024	TBA
"New York City"	2026	TBA

== Awards and nominations ==
Year	Award	Category	Work	Result	Ref.
2016	Grammy Awards	Best Musical Theater Album	Hamilton	Won	
2016	Broadway.com Audience Awards	Favorite Actor in a Featured Role in a Musical	Hamilton	Nominated	
2016	Broadway.com Audience Awards	Favorite Male Breakthrough Performance	Hamilton	Nominated	
2019	Screen Actors Guild Awards	Outstanding Performance by a Cast in a Motion Picture	A Star Is Born	Nominated	
2021	Hollywood Critics Association Midseason Awards	Best Actor in a Leading Role	In the Heights	Won	
2021	Primetime Emmy Awards	Outstanding Supporting Actor in a Limited or Anthology Series or Movie	Hamilton	Nominated	
2021	People's Choice Awards	The Drama Movie Star of 2021	In the Heights	Nominated	
2021	Hollywood Music in Media Awards	Song - Onscreen Performance (Note: Shared with the cast) (for "96,000")	In the Heights	Nominated	
2022	Golden Globe Awards	Best Actor in a Motion Picture – Musical or Comedy	In the Heights	Nominated	
2022	Black Reel Awards	Outstanding Breakthrough Performance, Male	In the Heights	Won	
2022	Satellite Awards	Best Actor in a Motion Picture – Comedy or Musical	In the Heights	Nominated	
2025	Critics Choice Celebration of Latino Cinema and Television	Supporting Actor Award - Film	A House of Dynamite	Won	
2026	Black Reel Awards	Outstanding Voice Performance	The Bad Guys 2	Nominated	
