= She's Gotta Have It (TV series) =

Television series created by Spike Lee

- Genre: Comedy drama
- Created by: Spike Lee
- Based on: She's Gotta Have It by Spike Lee
- Directed by: Spike Lee
- Starring: DeWanda Wise; Anthony Ramos; Lyriq Bent; Cleo Anthony; Margot Bingham; Chyna Layne; De'Adre Aziza
- Country of origin: United States
- Original language: English
- No. of seasons: 2
- No. of episodes: 19

Production
- Executive producers: Spike Lee; Tonya Lewis Lee
- Running time: 31–38 minutes
- Production companies: Tonik Productions; 40 Acres and a Mule Filmworks

Original release
- Network: Netflix
- Release: November 23, 2017 – May 24, 2019

She's Gotta Have It is an American comedy-drama television series created by Spike Lee. It is based on his 1986 film of the same name. Ten 30-minute episodes were ordered by Netflix, all of which were directed by Lee. The show premiered on November 23, 2017. On January 1, 2018, the series was renewed for a second season, which premiered on May 24, 2019. On July 17, 2019, Netflix canceled the series after two seasons.

== Cast and characters ==
=== Main ===
- DeWanda Wise as Nola Darling
- Anthony Ramos as Mars Blackmon
- Lyriq Bent as Jamie Overstreet
- Cleo Anthony as Greer Childs
- Margot Bingham as Clorinda "Clo" Bradford (season 2; recurring season 1)
- Chyna Layne as Shemekka Epps (season 2; recurring season 1)
- De'Adre Aziza as Raqueletta Moss (season 2; recurring season 1)

=== Recurring ===
- Ilfenesh Hadera as Opal Gilstrap
- Kim Director as Bianca Tate
- Sydney Morton as Cheryl Overstreet
- Elise Hudson as Rachel
- Elvis Nolasco as Papo
- Heather Headley as Dr. Jamison
- Fat Joe as Winnie Win
- Joie Lee as Septima Darling
- James McCaffrey as Danton Phillips
- Thomas Jefferson Byrd as Stokely
- Craig muMs Grant as Cash Jackson
- Nolan Gerard Funk as Andrew Goldling
- Wallace Shawn as Julius Kemper

== Music ==
The song "Black Girl Magic" by Chrisette Michele was going to be played in the show; however, Lee removed it after Michele performed at the inauguration of Donald Trump.

== Episodes ==
=== Series overview ===
| Season | Episodes | Originally released |
|---|---|---|
| 1 | 10 | November 23, 2017 |
| 2 | 9 | May 24, 2019 |

=== Season 1 (2017) ===
| No. overall | No. in season | Title | Directed by | Written by | Original release date |
|---|---|---|---|---|---|
| 1 | 1 | "#DaJumpoff (DOCTRINE)" | Spike Lee | Spike Lee | November 23, 2017 |
Artist Nola Darling's romantic life in gentrified Brooklyn is characterized by sexual freedom as she juggles three open relationships with thoughtful Jamie, carefree Mars, and cocky Greer. Despite her wish to manage her sexual relationships on her own terms, the three men struggle to accept her independence. Songs featured in episode: "Between the Sheets" by The Isley Brothers, "Set It Off" by Strafe, "Pretty Wings" by Maxwell, "Tender Love" by Force MDs and "Golden Jill" by Jill Scott.
| 2 | 2 | "#BootyFull (SELF ACCEPTANCE)" | Spike Lee | Radha Blank | November 23, 2017 |
The episode opens with Nola giving a monologue about the black female form. She states that she wants to paint a portrait of her friend Shemekka because she is representative of a Brooklyn-based black feminine style. During the painting of the portrait, Shemekka reveals that she met Nola at a house party when Nola spilled a drink on her. Songs featured in episode: "The Seed (2.0)" by The Roots, "Losing You" by Solange Knowles
| 3 | 3 | "#LBD (LITTLE BLACK DRESS)" | Spike Lee | Lynn Nottage | November 23, 2017 |
Nola presents her "Little Black Dress," in her three encounters with the men she is dating. Songs featured in episode: "You Make Me Feel So Young" by Frank Sinatra, "Autumn Serenade" by John Coltrane and Johnny Hartman, "Keep Looking" by Sade and "Anytime" by Brian McKnight.
| 4 | 4 | "#LuvIzLuv (SEXUALITY IS FLUID)" | Spike Lee | Eisa Davis | November 23, 2017 |
Nola decides that, for the time being, she does not want a man in her loving bed. The audience is then introduced to Opal Gilstrap, a former love interest of Nola's. She and Nola rekindle their sexual relationship. The pair spend more time with each other and Nola speaks about Opal with her therapist. While Nola and Opal are on the street, they run into Greer, and Nola acts embarrassed by Opal. Opal has a daughter, and she and Nola begin to bond, but she promises to see her before her bedtime and arrives too late. Opal is upset at Nola's lack of commitment, and they end their fling. Looking at the upside of things, Nola makes it to the second round of the Catlett Prize. Songs featured in episode: "Say Yes" by Floetry, "I Still Haven't Found What I'm Looking For" by Rhythms Del Mundo, U2 and Coco Freeman, "Fool of Me" by Meshell Ndegeocello, "Scene" by GBM Nutron
| 5 | 5 | "#4MyNegusAndMyBishes (ALL WORDS MATTER)" | Spike Lee | Barry Michael Cooper | November 23, 2017 |
Nola embarks on her new journey as an art teacher. She faces many challenges along the way. As for Shemekka, she decides to make a drastic change for her dance career to take off.
| 6 | 6 | "#HeGotItAllMixedUp (DYSLEXIA)" | Spike Lee | Cinqué Lee | November 23, 2017 |
Nola becomes increasingly nervous as her opening night arrives. Meanwhile, Shemekka's debut with her dance career coincides with Nola's group show. When the guys discover that they aren't invited to Nola's big night, they decide to take matters into their own hands.
| 7 | 7 | "#HowToMakeLoveToANegroWithoutGettingTired" | Spike Lee | Joie Lee | November 23, 2017 |
Greer opens up the episode about his first encounter with Nola. But now he's ready to be exclusive.
| 8 | 8 | "#LoveDontPayDaRent (IF YOU DON’T KNOW ME BY NOW)" | Spike Lee | Barry Michael Cooper | November 23, 2017 |
The episode opens with characters reacting to the election of Donald Trump, and article clippings and photographs of the new president. We cut to Nola smoking on her bed when she receives a call from Greer asking if he can come over. Nola tells Greer that she has sold one of her paintings, and then they have sex. While this occurs, she calls out Jamie's last name. She makes up an excuse. Jamie's wife shows him a picture on her phone of the self-portrait he purchased from Nola and asks, "Who is this?" She confronts Jamie about the $10,000 check he made out to Nola. They fight. Next, Nola is seen trying to purchase art supplies when her card is declined. Her rent check was bounced, causing the landlord to give a two-day eviction notice. Nola angrily calls Jamie to ask him why he canceled the check. Jamie responds by saying he will fix the situation and Nola replies that she wants her painting back. Nola tries to sell some of her artwork in front of her brownstone apartment to some tourists, to no avail. Songs featured in episode: "I Know" by Dionne Farris, "Mercy" by Prefab Sprout, "Outta Here" by KRS-One
| 9 | 9 | "#ChangeGonCome (GENTRIFICATION)" | Spike Lee | Radha Blank | November 23, 2017 |
Songs featured in episode: "This Woman's Work" by Maxwell, "Faithful" by Meshell Ndegeocello
| 10 | 10 | "#NolasChoice (3 DA HARD WAY)" | Spike Lee | Spike Lee | November 23, 2017 |
While Nola's parents are celebrating Thanksgiving with family, she decides to invite Mars, Jamie and Greer over for dinner. Songs featured in episode: "Be Real Black for Me" by Roberta Flack and Donny Hathaway, "Raspberry Beret" by Prince

=== Season 2 (2019) ===
| No. overall | No. in season | Title | Directed by | Written by | Original release date |
|---|---|---|---|---|---|
| 11 | 1 | "#I'mFeelingMyFeelings" | Spike Lee | Spike Lee | May 24, 2019 |
Songs featured in episode: “Everybody Loves the Sunshine” by Roy Ayers Ubiquity, “Frozen” by Madonna, “Back in the Day (Puff)” by Erykah Badu, “Cause We’ve Ended as Lovers” by Syreeta, “Beautiful” by Meshell Ndegeocello, “Nights Over Egypt” by The Jones Girls, “Maybe There’s Black People (In Fort Greene)” by Stew and The Negro Problem, “Brooklyn Omnibus” by Stew and The Negro Problem
| 12 | 2 | "#ConeyIslandIsTheEndOfTheLine" | Spike Lee | Cinqué Lee | May 24, 2019 |
| 13 | 3 | "#LuvStings" | Spike Lee | Jocelyn Bioh | May 24, 2019 |
| 14 | 4 | "#NationTime" | Spike Lee | Radha Blank | May 24, 2019 |
| 15 | 5 | "#SuperFunkyCaliFragiSexy" | Spike Lee | Barry Michael Cooper | May 24, 2019 |
| 16 | 6 | "#WhenYourChickensComeHometoRoost" | Spike Lee | Antoinette Nwandu | May 24, 2019 |
| 17 | 7 | "#OhJudoKnow?" | Spike Lee | Lemon Andersen | May 24, 2019 |
| 18 | 8 | "#OnTheComeUpTheComeDown&TheComeRound" | Spike Lee | Joie Lee | May 24, 2019 |
| 19 | 9 | "#IAmYourMirror" | Spike Lee | Eisa Davis | May 24, 2019 |

== Reception ==
She's Gotta Have It has received positive reviews from critics. As of July 2019, the show holds a score of 77 out of 100 on the review aggregator Metacritic, based on 26 critics. On Rotten Tomatoes, the first season holds an 83% rating based on 63 reviews, with an average rating of 7.9/10. The site's consensus is: "Fun, fascinating and feminist, Spike Lee's classic is born again for a new generation."

The second season has a 73% approval rating on Rotten Tomatoes, based on 11 reviews, with an average rating of 4.4/10. The site's consensus was: "She's Gotta Have It wades through some narrative wilderness after shifting away from its founding romantic conceit, but Spike Lee's vibrant eye and DeWanda Wise's darling performance keep proceedings engaging."
