= Cinqué Lee =

American actor and filmmaker (born 1966)

- Born: July 4, 1966 (age 59); Brooklyn, New York, United States
- Occupation(s): Actor, filmmaker
- Years active: 1986–present
- Parent: Bill Lee
- Relatives: Spike Lee (brother); David Lee (brother); Joie Lee (sister); Malcolm D. Lee (cousin)

Cinqué Lee (born July 4, 1966) is an American actor and filmmaker. He is the younger brother of filmmaker Spike Lee.

== Acting ==
Lee has worked in a number of different positions in his older brother's films, as a camera operator, video archivist, and most notably as a co-screenwriter in Crooklyn (1994). He also had small roles in School Daze (1988) and Oldboy (2013). As an actor, he appeared in the Jim Jarmusch-directed films Mystery Train (1989) and Coffee and Cigarettes (2003), and a number of other independent films.

== Filmography ==
Lee is also a filmmaker himself, directing, producing and writing the following films: Window on Your Present (1988), Nowhere Fast (1997), Sink Like a Stone (2000), UR4 Given (2004), and Burn Out the Day (2010, co-directed with Sean Bohary).
