= She's Gotta Have It =

1986 film by Spike Lee

- Theatrical release poster
- Directed by: Spike Lee
- Written by: Spike Lee
- Produced by: Spike Lee (Note: Credited under his real name, Shelton J. Lee.)
- Starring: Tracy Camilla Johns; Tommy Redmond Hicks; John Canada Terrell; Spike Lee; Raye Dowell
- Cinematography: Ernest Dickerson
- Edited by: Spike Lee
- Music by: Bill Lee
- Production company: 40 Acres & A Mule Filmworks
- Distributed by: Island Pictures
- Release dates: May 1986 (Cannes); August 8, 1986 (US)
- Running time: 84 minutes
- Country: United States
- Language: English
- Budget: $175,000
- Box office: $7.1 million

She's Gotta Have It is a 1986 American romantic comedy-drama film written, directed, produced, and edited by Spike Lee in his feature-length directorial debut. It stars Tracy Camilla Johns, Tommy Redmond Hicks, John Canada Terrell, and Lee. The film follows a young woman who is dating three men and explores the feelings this arrangement provokes.

Filmed on a low budget of $175,000, it earned positive reviews and grossed $7.1 million, launching Lee's career. Lee won the Award of the Youth at the 1986 Cannes Film Festival, and Best First Feature at the 1987 Independent Spirit Awards. In 2019, the film was selected for preservation in the United States National Film Registry by the Library of Congress as being "culturally, historically, or aesthetically significant".

A streaming television series adaptation, created and directed by Lee, debuted on Netflix in 2017.

== Plot ==
Nola Darling is a young, attractive graphic artist living in Brooklyn who juggles three suitors: polite and well-meaning Jamie Overstreet; self-obsessed model Greer Childs; and immature, motor-mouthed Mars Blackmon. Nola is attracted to the best in each of them, but refuses to commit to any of them, cherishing her personal freedom instead, while each man wants her for himself.

Her carefree, sexually liberated lifestyle ultimately comes to an end when her three male suitors meet and compare notes on Nola. While Greer justifies Nola's callous behavior by claiming that she sees the three not as individuals but as a collective, Jamie and Mars become bitter over how little Nola cares for all three men. Opal, a lesbian friend of Nola's who believes every person is capable of sexual fluidity, expresses attraction to her and when Nola asks how having sex with a woman is, offers her an opportunity to find out. However, Nola declines.

Realizing that Greer and Mars are too scared of losing Nola to force her to choose one of them, Jamie tells her that she must choose a single lover. Nola scoffs at this, and persuades him to come to her apartment several days later for casual sex. Jamie rapes her and mockingly asks her if he's as good sexually as Greer or Mars. Nola has an epiphany: realizing that her choices have turned Jamie against her, she decides to call his bluff. Nola dumps Greer and Mars and tells Jamie that she is ready for a monogamous relationship. Believing that her sexual activity has prevented her from committing to a single guy, Nola tells Jamie their relationship has to be celibate for the time being. After at first rejecting Nola's "no sex" decree, Jamie agrees to it.

Nola and Jamie's reunion, however, is followed by a coda which dismantles the "happy ending" of the couple coming together. In a monologue delivered to the camera, Nola reveals that her vow of celibacy and her decision to be with Jamie exclusively was "a moment of weakness". She says that she soon began to cheat on Jamie and their relationship collapsed. Nola proudly proclaims that monogamy is a form of slavery and that her lifestyle is freedom in its purest form. The film closes with a view of Nola going to bed alone.

== Themes ==
Nola idealizes the freedom to have multiple sexual partners that men have typically enjoyed. "A woman (or, at least Nola) can be a sexual being, doesn't have to belong to a man, and perhaps shouldn't even wish for such a thing." The narrative provided by Nola's narration has been described as the most revolutionary element in the film, a representation of the struggle African American women faced in society at the time.

== Cast ==
- Tracy Camilla Johns as Nola Darling
- Tommy Redmond Hicks as Jamie Overstreet
- John Canada Terrell as Greer Childs
- Spike Lee as Mars Blackmon
- Raye Dowell as Opal Gilstrap
- Joie Lee as Clorinda Bradford
- Dennis Karika as The Trainer
- S. Epatha Merkerson as Dr. Jamison
- Bill Lee as Sonny Darling
- Monty Ross as Dog #1
- Tiziano Cortini (as Lewis Jordan) as Dog #2
- Erik Dellums as Dog #3
- Reginald Hudlin as Dog #4
- Eric Payne as Dog #5
- Marcus Turner as Dog #6
- Gerard Brown as Dog #7
- Ernest Dickerson as Dog #8
- Eric Wilkins as Dog #9
- Fab Five Freddy as Dog #10
- Scott Sillers as Dog #11
- Geoffrey Garfield as Dog #12

== Influence ==
She's Gotta Have It was Lee's first feature-length motion picture as a writer/director and is a landmark independent film of American cinema. He was initially inspired by viewing Akira Kurosawa's Rashomon in film school.

The New York Times wrote that the film

ushered in (along with Jim Jarmusch's Stranger Than Paradise) the American independent film movement of the 1980s. It was also a groundbreaking film for African-American filmmakers and a welcome change in the representation of blacks in American cinema, depicting men and women of color not as pimps and whores, but as intelligent, upscale urbanites.

== Production ==
In the summer of 1984, filmmaker Spike Lee originally intended to shoot a film titled Messenger, centered around a bicycle messenger. However, due to difficulties in securing funding, this project fell through. The setback led Lee to craft a script feasible within his financial means. Despite facing challenges, Lee managed to redirect an $18,000 grant from the New York State Council on the Arts, initially intended for Messenger, towards She's Gotta Have It. Lee was inspired to do the film by conversations he had with male friends that boasted about how many female friends they had, which led him to want to make a movie about an "independent Black woman who is leading her life as a man as far as relationships go." While a $20,000 grant from the American Film Institute for his previous work was revoked, the film also used a $10,000 grant from the Jerome Foundation, and $500 from the Brooklyn Arts and Cultural Association. Lee adopted a cost-effective approach, working with minimal locations, and no elaborate costumes or sets, to complete the film without the prolonged effort of raising substantial funds for a larger production. To research the lead character, "Nora Darling," Lee collaborated with his Spelman College classmate Tracey Willard, creating a questionnaire circulated among thirty-five women. The questions delved into various topics, including unfulfilled fantasies, perceptions of men, and preferences in sexual acts.

Facing budget constraints, Lee took on the role of "Mars Blackmon" himself, as he could not afford to hire another actor. The production involved Lee's family and friends, with his father, Bill Lee, composing the film's score and making a cameo as "Sonny Darling." Lee's sister, Joie Lee, played "Clorinda Bradford," and his brother, David Lee, handled still photography. Cinematographer Ernest Dickerson had a cameo as "Dog #8." Actor John Canada Terrell, has claimed that Lee cast him without an audition. This would be Terrell's breakout role and he would later appear in Mo' Better Blues (1990). She's Gotta Have It was the feature film debut of actress Raye Dowell.

Filmed over twelve days during the summer of 1985 in Brooklyn, New York, in the neighborhoods of Fort Greene, Bedford–Stuyvesant, Brooklyn Heights, Downtown Brooklyn, Crown Heights, and at the Ferry Bank Restaurant, the film adhered to a $175,000 budget. Shot predominantly in black and white with a single color sequence, Lee worked with a non-union crew, without film permits or insurance. Originally filmed in Super 16 mm, Lee scrambled to secure funds for a 35 mm blowup when the film was accepted into the January 1986 San Francisco Film Festival.

Despite Island Pictures' policy of distributing unrated films, Lee believed that an R rating was crucial for the film's success and did multiple edits to secure an R rating from the Motion Picture Association of America. Finding the pre-edited film's content comparable to mainstream films like Body Double (1984) and 9½ Weeks (1986), Lee contended that the board's demands for numerous cuts were rooted in discomfort with African-American love scenes.

To finish the film, Lee also held a rough cut screening at NYU, later calling attendees to "become financially involved in helping us complete it." The film was profitable, earning $7.1 million domestically.

== Impact ==
The film catalyzed the Fort Greene, Brooklyn neighborhood where it was shot. Lee portrayed the neighborhood as a vibrant cosmopolitan community where successful African Americans thrived, focusing not only on Nola and her struggles, but also on local children, residents, and graffiti. Fort Greene Park is the setting of much of the movie, and is portrayed as a comfortable place for the characters. People were encouraged to investigate the area's public spaces and viewers in other places investigated similar thriving public spaces of community importance.

Writer and director Quentin Tarantino, along with collaborators Roger Avary and Craig Hamann, consider the production and low budget nature of the film a major influence in making his unreleased first film My Best Friend's Birthday and later Reservoir Dogs.

Following the film's release, media attention was drawn to Brooklyn, and to its artists and musicians.

== Release ==
=== Box office ===
She's Gotta Have It opened in one theater on August 8, 1986, and earned $28,473 on its opening weekend. The film ultimately grossed $7,137,503 in the United States.

=== Critical response ===
The film was very well received by critics and audiences. Review aggregator website Rotten Tomatoes reports a 91% score based on 87 reviews, with an average rating of 7.2/10. The consensus states: "With She's Gotta Have It, Spike Lee delivered his bracing first shot across Hollywood's bow--and set the template for the groundbreaking act to follow." It holds a 79/100 average on Metacritic.

The New York Times Film critic, D.J.R. Bruckner, wrote of the film in 1986: "stripped of some of the distractions of this presentation, their story has a touch of the classic. These people are not victims of blind forces; they make choices, defend them and grow in understanding, not always happily, as a result. Their story would be more enjoyable in a more polished film, but it has a power that is not dissipated by this one's weaknesses."

John Simon of the National Review called She's Gotta Have It a "cutesy, trivial sex carousel".

=== Home media ===
She's Gotta Have It was first released on VHS, initially by Key Video and later by PolyGram Video as part of a distribution deal with Chris Blackwell's Island World Group, which retained the rights following the purchase of Island Records by PolyGram (PolyGram would eventually acquire the rest of Island in December 1994).

In the mid-1990s, The Criterion Collection released the film on laserdisc. According to Lee's agent, the film was to be eventually released on DVD. Jonathan Turell of The Criterion Collection ended that rumor, saying "No for She's Gotta Have It. We don't have DVD rights." This laserdisc is the only release of the film that has the unrated director's cut, including sexual content that was cut to obtain an R rating. This release also contains an exclusive commentary by Spike Lee.

The film's first North American DVD release was in January 2008 by 20th Century Fox Home Entertainment through United Artists and Metro-Goldwyn-Mayer. Despite its availability on DVD in the United Kingdom, the DVD release for Region 1 took longer than expected.

In 2010, the film was digitized in High Definition (1080i) and broadcast on MGM HD.

== Awards and honors ==
1986 Cannes Film Festival

- Award of the Youth, Foreign Film – Spike Lee (won)

1986 Los Angeles Film Critics Awards

- New Generation Award – Spike Lee (won)

1987 Independent Spirit Awards

- Best First Feature – Spike Lee (won)
- Best Female Lead – Tracy Camilla Johns (nominated)

In 2019, the film was selected by the Library of Congress for preservation in the National Film Registry for being "culturally, historically, or aesthetically significant".

== TV series ==
On September 15, 2016, Netflix announced a deal to produce a series based on the film, with Lee returning to direct the first season and serve as executive producer. Ten 30-minute episodes were ordered. Netflix released the series in November 2017. On July 17, 2019, Netflix canceled the series after two seasons.

=== Reflection ===
In 2014, Lee said that his one regret as a filmmaker was the rape scene in She's Gotta Have It:

If I was able to have any do-overs, that would be it. It was just totally ... stupid. I was immature. It made light of rape, and that's the one thing I would take back. I was immature and I hate that I did not view rape as the vile act that it is. I can promise you, there will be nothing like that in She's Gotta Have It, the TV show, that's for sure.
