= List of awards and nominations received by Spike Lee =

Spike Lee awards and nominations
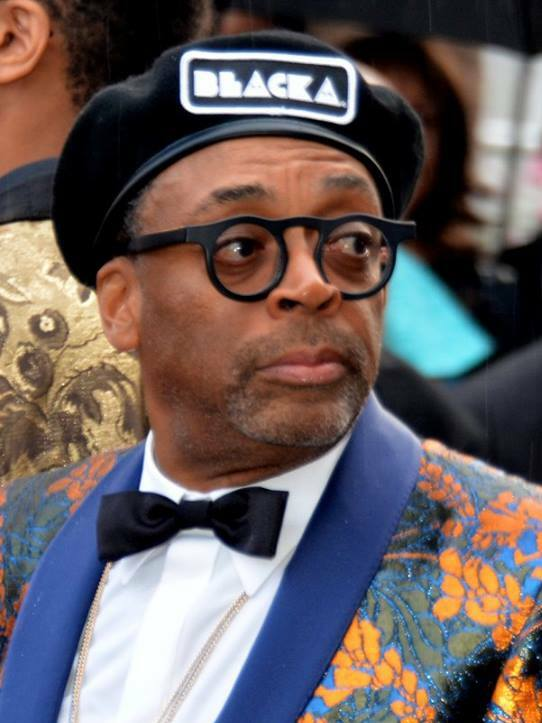
- Lee at the Cannes Film Festival
Awards and nominations
Award	Wins	Nominations
Academy Awards	2	6
BAFTA Awards	1	3
Emmy Awards	4	8
Grammy Awards	0	1
Golden Globes	0	3
Peabody Awards	2	2

Totals (Note: Certain award groups do not simply award one winner. They acknowledge several different recipients, have runners-up, and have third place. Since this is a specific recognition and is different from losing an award, runner-up mentions are considered wins in this award tally. For simplification and to avoid errors, each award in this list has been presumed to have had a prior nomination.)
- Wins: 28
- Nominations: 79

The following is a list of awards and nominations received by Spike Lee.

Spike Lee is an American filmmaker and actor. He is known for directing racial dramas, historical epics, thrillers, war dramas, social satires and documentary films. Lee has received various awards including an Academy Award, a British Academy Film Award, four Emmy Awards and two Peabody Awards as well as nominations for a Grammy Award, three Golden Globe Awards, and three Critics' Choice Movie Awards.

Lee started his career with an early student film Joe's Bed-Stuy Barbershop: We Cut Heads (1983) which earned the Student Academy Award. He directed his seminal breakthrough work, the racial drama Do the Right Thing (1989) which received acclaim as well nominations for the Academy Award for Best Original Screenplay as well as two Golden Globe Awards (for Best Director and Best Screenplay).

He directed the historical documentary film 4 Little Girls (1997) which was nominated for the Academy Award for Best Documentary Feature Film and the Primetime Emmy Award for Outstanding Documentary or Nonfiction Special. With the historical comedy-drama BlacKkKlansman (2018), he won the Academy Award for Best Adapted Screenplay, his first competitive win, as well as nominations for Best Picture and Best Director.

He directed the HBO documentary miniseries When the Levees Broke (2006) for which he received a Peabody Award as well as two Primetime Emmy Awards (for Outstanding Directing for a Documentary/Nonfiction Program and the Exceptional Merit in Documentary Filmmaking). He directed another HBO documentary, If God Is Willing and da Creek Don't Rise (2010) for which he won his second Peabody Award. He directed the HBO David Byrne concert film American Utopia (2020) for which he was nominated for the Grammy Award for Best Music Film.

Over his career he has received numerous honors including the Special BAFTA Award in 2002, an Honorary César in 2003, The Dorothy and Lillian Gish Prize in 2013, the Academy of Motion Picture Arts and Sciences's Academy Honorary Award in 2015, the Directors Guild of America's Lifetime Achievement Award in 2022, and the American Society of Cinematographers Board of Governor's Award in 2024. He was presented with the National Medal of Arts from President Joe Biden in 2023.

== Major Associations ==
=== Academy Awards ===
Year	Category	Nominated work	Result	Ref.
1983	Student Academy Award	Joe's Bed-Stuy Barbershop: We Cut Heads	Won	
1989	Best Original Screenplay	Do the Right Thing	Nominated	
1997	Best Documentary Feature	4 Little Girls	Nominated	
2015	Academy Honorary Award		Recipient	
2018	Best Picture	BlacKkKlansman	Nominated	
2018	Best Director	BlacKkKlansman	Nominated	
2018	Best Adapted Screenplay	BlacKkKlansman	Won	

=== BAFTA Awards ===
Year	Category	Nominated work	Result	Ref.
British Academy Film Awards
2002	Special Award	Himself	Recipient	
2018	Best Film	BlacKkKlansman	Nominated	
2018	Best Direction	BlacKkKlansman	Nominated	
2018	Best Adapted Screenplay	BlacKkKlansman	Won	

=== Critics' Choice Awards ===
Year	Category	Nominated work	Result	Ref.
Critics' Choice Movie Awards
2018	Best Director	BlacKkKlansman	Nominated	
2018	Best Adapted Screenplay	BlacKkKlansman	Nominated	
2020	Best Director	Da 5 Bloods	Nominated	

=== Emmy Awards ===
Year	Category	Nominated work	Result	Ref.
Primetime Emmy Awards
1998	Outstanding Documentary or Nonfiction Special	4 Little Girls	Nominated	
2007	Outstanding Directing for Nonfiction Programing	When the Levees Broke	Won	
2007	Exceptional Merit in Documentary	When the Levees Broke	Won	
2021	Outstanding Variety Special (Pre-Recorded)	David Byrne's American Utopia	Nominated	
2021	Outstanding Directing for a Variety Special	David Byrne's American Utopia	Nominated	
New York Emmy Awards
2015	Entertainment: Program/Special	The Lineup: Best New York Movies	Won	
2015	Interview/Discussion	The Lineup: Best New York Movies	Won	
Sports Emmy Awards
2022	Outstanding Production	The 2021 NBA Finals	Nominated	

=== Golden Globe Awards ===
Year	Category	Nominated work	Result	Ref.
1990	Best Director	Do The Right Thing	Nominated	
1990	Best Screenplay	Do The Right Thing	Nominated	
2019	Best Director	BlacKkKlansman	Nominated	

=== Grammy Awards ===
Year	Category	Nominated work	Result	Ref.
2022	Best Music Film	David Byrne's American Utopia	Nominated	

=== Peabody Awards ===
Year	Category	Nominated work	Result	Ref.
2001	Peabody Award	A Huey P. Newton Story	Won	
2006	Peabody Award	When the Levees Broke: A Requiem in Four Acts	Won	
2010	Peabody Award	If God Is Willing and da Creek Don't Rise	Won	

== Festival awards ==
Organizations	Year	Category	Work	Result	Ref.
American Black Film Festival	1998	Best Director	4 Little Girls	Nominated	
American Black Film Festival	1999	Best Director	He Got Game	Nominated	
American Black Film Festival	1999	Best Screenplay	He Got Game	Nominated	
American Black Film Festival	2004	Time Warner Innovator Award		Won	
Atlanta Film Festival	2005	Ossie Davis Award		Won	
Berlin International Film Festival	1993	Golden Bear	Malcolm X	Nominated	
Berlin International Film Festival	1997	Golden Bear	Get on the Bus	Nominated	
Berlin International Film Festival	1997	Honourable Mention	Get on the Bus	Won	
Berlin International Film Festival	2001	Golden Bear	Bamboozled	Nominated	
Berlin International Film Festival	2003	Golden Bear	25th Hour	Nominated	
Cannes Film Festival	1986	Caméra d'Or	She's Gotta Have It	Nominated	
Cannes Film Festival	1986	Award of the Youth	She's Gotta Have It	Won	
Cannes Film Festival	1989	Palme d'Or	Do the Right Thing	Nominated	
Cannes Film Festival	1991	Palme d'Or	Jungle Fever	Nominated	
Cannes Film Festival	1991	Ecumenical Jury - Special Mention	Jungle Fever	Won	
Cannes Film Festival	1999	C.I.C.A.E. Award	Summer of Sam	Nominated	
Cannes Film Festival	2002	Un Certain Regard Award	Ten Minutes Older: The Trumpet	Nominated	
Cannes Film Festival	2018	Palme d'Or	BlacKkKlansman	Nominated	
Cannes Film Festival	2018	Grand Prix	BlacKkKlansman	Won	
Cannes Film Festival	2018	Ecumenical Jury - Special Mention	BlacKkKlansman	Won	
Capri Hollywood International Film Festival	2018	Best Adapted Screenplay	Blackkklansman	Won	

== Miscellaneous awards ==
Organizations	Year	Category	Work	Result	Ref.
Black Movie Awards	2006	Best Director	Inside Man	Won	
Black Reel Awards	2000	Best Director	Summer of Sam	Nominated	
Black Reel Awards	2000	Best Film	The Best Man	Nominated	
Black Reel Awards	2001	Best Screenplay, Adapted or Original	Bamboozled	Nominated	
Black Reel Awards	2001	Best Director	Bamboozled	Nominated	
Black Reel Awards	2001	Best Film	Bamboozled	Nominated	
Black Reel Awards	2001	Best Film	Love & Basketball	Won	
Black Reel Awards	2002	Network/Cable - Best Film	3 A.M.	Nominated	
Black Reel Awards	2002	Best Director: Television	A Huey P. Newton Story	Nominated'	
Black Reel Awards	2003	Best Director	25th Hour	Nominated	
Black Reel Awards	2003	Best Film	25th Hour	Nominated	
Black Reel Awards	2005	Best Screenplay, Adapted or Original	She Hate Me	Nominated	
Black Reel Awards	2005	Best Director	She Hate Me	Nominated	
Black Reel Awards	2006	Best Director: Television	Sucker Free City	Nominated	
Black Reel Awards	2006	Best Director: Television	Miracle's Boys	Nominated	
Black Reel Awards	2007	Best Director	Inside Man	Won	
Black Reel Awards	2008	Best Director	Miracle at St. Anna	Nominated	
Black Reel Awards	2008	Best Film	Miracle at St. Anna	Nominated	
Black Reel Awards	2010	Best Director	Passing Strange	Nominated	
Black Reel Awards	2010	Best Feature Documentary	Passing Strange	Nominated	
Black Reel Awards	2011	Best Television Documentary	If God Is Willing and Da Creek Don't Rise	Won	
Black Reel Awards	2013	Best Director	Red Hook Summer	Nominated	
Black Reel Awards	2013	Best Screenplay, Adapted or Original	Red Hook Summer	Nominated	
Black Reel Awards	2013	Best Feature Documentary	Bad 25	Nominated	
Detroit Film Critics Society Awards	2021	Best Director	Da 5 Bloods	Nominated	
NAACP Image Awards	1989	Outstanding Motion Picture	School Daze	Nominated	
NAACP Image Awards	1990	Outstanding Motion Picture	Do the Right Thing	Nominated	
NAACP Image Awards	1990	Outstanding Actor in a Motion Picture	Do the Right Thing	Nominated	
NAACP Image Awards	2007	Outstanding Directing in a Motion Picture	Inside Man	Won	
NAACP Image Awards	2009	Outstanding Directing in a Motion Picture	Miracle at St. Anna	Nominated	
NAACP Image Awards	2010	Outstanding Directing in a Motion Picture	Passing Strange: The Movie	Nominated	
NAACP Image Awards	2019	Outstanding Directing in a Motion Picture	BlacKkKlansman	Nominated	
NAACP Image Awards	2019	Outstanding Writing in a Motion Picture	BlacKkKlansman	Nominated	
Location Managers Guild Awards	2020	Location Managers Guild Trailblazer Award (Note: Spike Lee has been recognized by the Location Managers Guild International with their Trailblazer Award for his innovative and collaborative use of locations as a distinct character in his films. Lee saluted location managers, saying without them, "I would not be able do what I do" as he rarely shoots on sets. "I'm out in the streets; I love shooting in the streets of New York City, especially the people's republic of Brooklyn, New York.")		Won	
Location Managers Guild Awards	2020	Outstanding Locations in a Contemporary Film (Note: His films Da 5 Bloods & BlacKkKlansman have previously been nominated for their use of locations in their annual awards ceremony.)	Da 5 Bloods	Nominated	
Location Managers Guild Awards	2019	Outstanding Locations in a Period Film	BlacKkKlansman	Nominated	

== Honorary awards ==
Organizations	Year	Award	Result	Ref.
Academy of Motion Picture Arts and Sciences	2015	Academy Honorary Award	Honored	
American Society of Cinematographers	2024	Board of Governor's Award	Honored	
British Academy Film Awards	2002	Special BAFTA Award	Honored	
César Awards	2003	Honorary César	Honored	
Directors Guild of America	2022	Lifetime Achievement Award	Honored	
The Dorothy and Lillian Gish Prize	2013	Gish Prize	Honored	
National Endowment for the Arts	2023	National Medal of Arts	Honored	

== Awards and nominations received by Lee's films ==
Year	Film	Academy Awards		BAFTA Awards		Golden Globe Awards	
Year	Film	Nominations	Wins	Nominations	Wins	Nominations	Wins
1989	Do the Right Thing	2				4	
1992	Malcolm X	2				1	
2002	25th Hour					1	
2018	BlacKkKlansman	6	1	5	1	4	
2020	Da 5 Bloods	1		1			
Total		11	1	6	1	10	0

Directed Academy Award performances
Under Lee's direction, these actors have received Academy Award nominations for their performances in their respective roles.

Year	Performer	Film	Result
Academy Award for Best Actor
1992	Denzel Washington	Malcolm X	Nominated
Academy Award for Best Supporting Actor
1989	Danny Aiello	Do the Right Thing	Nominated
2018	Adam Driver	BlacKkKlansman	Nominated
