= Spike Lee filmography =

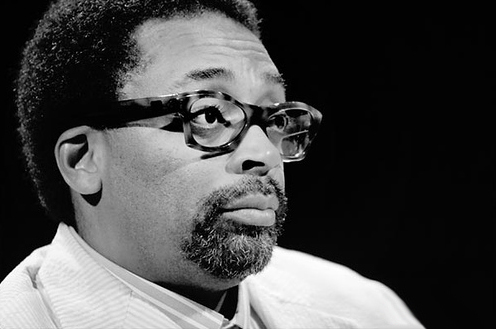
Lee c. 1990s

Spike Lee is an American filmmaker and actor, known for films that deal with controversial social and political issues. Each of Lee's films typically refers to itself as "A Spike Lee Joint" and the closing credits always end with the phrases "By Any Means Necessary," "Ya Dig," and "Sho Nuff."

Lee received a Master of Fine Arts from New York University's Tisch School of the Arts, which culminated in his thesis film Joe's Bed-Stuy Barbershop: We Cut Heads, the first student film to be shown in Lincoln Center's New Directors/New Films Festival. Lee's first feature film, She's Gotta Have It, was released three years later in 1986. Lee directed, produced, wrote, and acted in his first three feature films: She's Gotta Have It, School Daze, and Do the Right Thing, and has since starred or acted in others. He reprised the role of Mars Blackmon from She's Gotta Have It for a series of Nike commercials that also starred Michael Jordan.

Lee has directed music videos by artists such as Prince, Michael Jackson, Anita Baker and Eminem, and for songs featured in films he has directed, including "Fight the Power" by Public Enemy, which was featured heavily in the 1989 film Do the Right Thing.

== Filmography ==
=== Short film ===
| Year | Title | Credited as | | | Notes |
| Year | Title | Director | Writer | Producer | Notes |
|---|---|---|---|---|---|
| 1979 | Last Hustle in Brooklyn | Yes | Yes | No | |
| 1980 | The Answer | Yes | Yes | No | |
| 1981 | Sarah | Yes | Yes | No | |
| 1995 | Lumière and Company | Yes | No | No | Segment |
| 2001 | Come Rain or Come Shine | Yes | No | No | |
| 2002 | "We Wuz Robbed" | Yes | No | Yes | Segment of Ten Minutes Older: The Trumpet |
| 2005 | "Jesus Children of America" | Yes | No | Yes | Segment of All the Invisible Children |
| 2017 | Brave: Visions for Moncler | Yes | No | No | |
| 2020 | New York, New York | Yes | Yes | Yes | |
| 2020 | 3 Brothers: Radio Raheem, Eric Garner and George Floyd | Yes | Yes | Yes | |

=== Feature film ===
| Year | Title | Credited as | | | |
| Year | Title | Director | Producer | Writer | Notes |
|---|---|---|---|---|---|
| 1983 | Joe's Bed-Stuy Barbershop: We Cut Heads | Yes | Yes | Yes | Also editor and assistant camera |
| 1986 | She's Gotta Have It | Yes | Yes | Yes | Also editor Inducted into the National Film Registry in 2019 |
| 1988 | School Daze | Yes | Yes | Yes | |
| 1989 | Do the Right Thing | Yes | Yes | Yes | Inducted into the National Film Registry in 1999 |
| 1990 | Mo' Better Blues | Yes | Yes | Yes | |
| 1991 | Jungle Fever | Yes | Yes | Yes | |
| 1992 | Malcolm X | Yes | Yes | Yes | Inducted into the National Film Registry in 2010 |
| 1994 | Crooklyn | Yes | Yes | Yes | |
| 1995 | Clockers | Yes | Yes | Yes | |
| 1996 | Girl 6 | Yes | Yes | No | |
| 1996 | Get on the Bus | Yes | Executive | No | |
| 1998 | He Got Game | Yes | Yes | Yes | |
| 1999 | Summer of Sam | Yes | Yes | Yes | |
| 2000 | Bamboozled | Yes | Yes | Yes | Inducted into the National Film Registry in 2023 |
| 2002 | 25th Hour | Yes | Yes | No | |
| 2004 | She Hate Me | Yes | Yes | Yes | |
| 2006 | Inside Man | Yes | No | No | |
| 2008 | Miracle at St. Anna | Yes | Yes | No | |
| 2012 | Red Hook Summer | Yes | Yes | Yes | |
| 2013 | Oldboy | Yes | No | No | |
| 2014 | Da Sweet Blood of Jesus | Yes | Yes | Yes | |
| 2015 | Chi-Raq | Yes | Yes | Yes | |
| 2018 | BlacKkKlansman | Yes | Yes | Yes | |
| 2020 | Da 5 Bloods | Yes | Yes | Yes | |
| 2025 | Highest 2 Lowest | Yes | Executive | No | |

Executive producer

- Drop Squad (1994)
- New Jersey Drive (1995)
- Tales from the Hood (1995)
- Afrocentricity (2000)
- Good Fences (2003)
- Pariah (2011)
- Evolution of a Criminal (2014)
- Manos sucias (2014)
- Cronies (2015)
- The Girl Is in Trouble (2015)
- Tales from the Hood 2 (2018)
- Son of the South (2020)
- Tales from the Hood 3 (2020)
- You Resemble Me (2021)
- The Voice of Hind Rajab (2025)

Producer

- The Best Man (1999)
- Love & Basketball (2000)
- 3 A.M. (2001)
- Dream Street (2005)
- Saint John of Las Vegas (2009)
- You're Nobody 'til Somebody Kills You (2011)
- See You Yesterday (2019)
- Amazing Grace (2019)

=== Documentary film ===
| Year | Title | Credited as | |
| Year | Title | Director | Producer |
|---|---|---|---|
| 1997 | 4 Little Girls | Yes | Yes |
| 2000 | The Original Kings of Comedy | Yes | Yes |
| 2012 | Bad 25 | Yes | Yes |
| 2016 | Michael Jackson's Journey from Motown to Off the Wall | Yes | Yes |
| 2020 | American Utopia | Yes | Yes |

=== Acting roles ===
| Year | Film | Role | Notes |
|---|---|---|---|
| 1986 | She's Gotta Have It | Mars Blackmon | |
| 1988 | School Daze | Darrell "Half-Pint" Dunlap | |
| 1989 | Do the Right Thing | Mookie | |
| 1990 | Mo' Better Blues | Giant | |
| 1990 | Lonely in America | Himself | |
| 1991 | Jungle Fever | Cyrus | |
| 1992 | Malcolm X | Shorty | |
| 1994 | Crooklyn | Snuffy | |
| 1994 | Drop Squad | Himself | |
| 1995 | Lumière and Company | Himself | Short film |
| 1995 | Clockers | Chucky | |
| 1996 | Girl 6 | Jimmy | |
| 1999 | Summer of Sam | John Jeffries | |
| 2000 | Lisa Picard Is Famous | Himself | |
| 2012 | Red Hook Summer | Mookie | Uncredited |

== Television ==
| Year | Title | Credited as | | | Notes |
| Year | Title | Director | Producer | Writer | Notes |
|---|---|---|---|---|---|
| 2004 | Sucker Free City | Yes | Yes | No | Television film |
| 2005 | Miracle's Boys | Yes | No | No | Episodes: "New Charlie" and "Bond of Brothers" |
| 2006 | Shark | Yes | No | No | Pilot |
| 2007 | M.O.N.Y. | Yes | No | No | Unaired pilot |
| 2011 | Da Brick | Yes | Yes | No | Unaired pilot |
| 2014 | Katt Williams: Priceless: Afterlife | Yes | Executive | No | Stand-up special |
| 2014 | Jerrod Carmichael: Love at the Store | Yes | No | No | Stand-up special |
| 2017–2019 | She's Gotta Have It | Yes | Executive | Yes | Creator |

=== Documentary ===
| Year | Title | Credited as | |
| Year | Title | Director | Producer |
|---|---|---|---|
| 1990 | Spike Lee & Company: Do It a Cappella | Yes | No |
| 1999 | Pavarotti and Friends for Guatemala and Kosovo | Yes | No |
| 2002 | Jim Brown: All-American | Yes | Yes |
| 2006 | When the Levees Broke: A Requiem in Four Acts | Yes | Yes |
| 2009 | Kobe Doin' Work | Yes | Yes |
| 2010 | If God Is Willing and da Creek Don't Rise | Yes | Yes |
| 2021 | NYC Epicenters 9/11→2021½ | Yes | Yes |
| 2022 | The Captain | No | Yes |
| 2025 | Katrina: Come Hell and High Water | Yes | Yes |

=== Stage show ===
| Year | Title | Credited as | |
| Year | Title | Director | Producer |
|---|---|---|---|
| 1998 | Freak | Yes | No |
| 2001 | A Huey P. Newton Story | Yes | No |
| 2008 | Passing Strange | Yes | No |
| 2013 | Mike Tyson: Undisputed Truth | Yes | Yes |
| 2017 | Rodney King | Yes | Yes |
| 2018 | Pass Over | Yes | No |
| 2020 | American Utopia | Yes | Yes |

=== Acting roles ===
| Year | Title | Role | Notes |
|---|---|---|---|
| 1986 | Saturday Night Live | Mars Blackmon | Episode: "Malcolm-Jamal Warner/Run-DMC" |
| 1992 | Ghostwriter | Special Agent Pete | Episode: "Into the Comics: Part 1" |
| 2017–2019 | She's Gotta Have It | Joe the Bartender / Drum Major | 2 episodes |

== Music videos ==
| Year | Artist | Song | Album |
|---|---|---|---|
| 1983 | Grandmaster Flash and Melle Mel | "White Lines (Don't Don't Do It)" | Non-album single |
| 1987 | Anita Baker | "No One in the World" | Rapture |
| 1988 | E.U. | "Da Butt" | School Daze OST |
| 1989 | Public Enemy | "Fight the Power" | Do the Right Thing OST and Fear of a Black Planet |
| 1991 | Fishbone | "Sunless Saturday" | The Reality of My Surroundings |
| 1991 | State of Art | "Understanding" | Community |
| 1992 | State of Art | "Laughing at the Years" | Community |
| 1992 | Prince and the New Power Generation | "Money Don't Matter 2 Night" | Diamonds and Pearls |
| 1992 | Arrested Development | "Revolution" | Malcolm X OST |
| 1993 | Naughty by Nature | "Hip Hop Hooray" | 19 Naughty III |
| 1993 | Eros Ramazzotti | "Cose della vita" | Tutte storie |
| 1993 | Bruce Hornsby | "Talk of the Town" | Harbor Lights |
| 1994 | Buckshot LeFonque | "Breakfast at Denny's" | Buckshot LeFonque |
| 1996 | Michael Jackson | "They Don't Care About Us" (Prison Version) | HIStory: Past, Present and Future, Book I |
| 1996 | Michael Jackson | "They Don't Care About Us" (Brazil/Olodum Version) | HIStory: Past, Present and Future, Book I |
| 2000 | Mau Maus | "Blak Iz Blak" | Bamboozled |
| 2009 | Michael Jackson | "This Is It" | This Is It |
| 2014 | Eminem | "Headlights" | The Marshall Mathers LP 2 |
| 2019 | The Killers | "Land of the Free" | Non-album singles |
| 2020 | Michael Jackson | "They Don't Care About Us" (2020) | Non-album singles |

== Video games ==
| Year | Title | Credited as | | |
| Year | Title | Director | Executive Producer | Writer |
|---|---|---|---|---|
| 2015 | NBA 2K16 | Yes | Yes | Yes |

== See also ==
- Spike Lee's unrealized projects

== Bibliography ==
- "Spike Lee > Filmography". Allmovie.
- "Spike Lee – Rotten Tomatoes Celebrity Profile". Rotten Tomatoes.
