= Leonard L. Thomas =

American film and television actor (born 1961)

- Born: Leonard Lee Thomas; August 31, 1961 (age 63); Muskogee, Oklahoma, U.S.
- Education: Howard University (BFA)
- Occupation: Actor
- Years active: 1985–present
- Spouse: Iris Little-Thomas (m. 1990)
- Children: 2

Leonard Lee Thomas (born August 31, 1961) is an American film and television actor. He is perhaps best known for his role as Big Brother ADP General Patton in Spike Lee's film School Daze.

== Early life ==
Thomas was born in Muskogee, Oklahoma. He earned a Bachelor of Fine Arts degree from Howard University in 1983.

== Career ==
Since the beginning of his acting career beginning with School Daze, Thomas has appeared in over twenty movies, often in a minor role alongside Samuel L. Jackson, and is frequently credited as his assistant. In particular, his most notable film roles are in Spike Lee movies including School Daze, Do the Right Thing, Mo' Better Blues, and Malcolm X. He also starred other movies such as Bad Lieutenant and Black Snake Moan and TV shows like Gemini Division and Law & Order.

== Personal life ==
In 1990, Thomas married actress Iris Little, who is best known for her role as Judge Barbara Lansky in the drama show Law & Order. Together they have two children.

== Filmography ==
=== Film ===
Year	Title	Role	Notes
1988	School Daze	George Patton	
1988	The Laser Man	Sergeant Williams	
1989	Do the Right Thing	Punchy	
1990	King of New York	Blood	
1990	Mo' Better Blues	Mo	
1990	The Return of Superfly	Joey Maxwell	
1991	At the Bus Stop	Man	
1992	Bad Lieutenant	Cop Two	
1992	Malcolm X	Leon Davis	
1993	Dangerous Game	Prop Guy	
1994	The Cowboy Way	Train Conductor	
1994	Drop Squad	XB	
1995	Major Payne	Bleeding Soldier	
1995	Clockers	Onion the Bar Patron	
1996	Girl 6	Co-Agent	
1996	A Time to Kill	Man in Lumberyard	
1997	One Eight Seven	New York Assistant Principal	
1997	Eve's Bayou	Maynard	
1998	The Negotiator	Allen	
2001	The Caveman's Valentine	Shaker / Greater No Face	
2002	Changing Lanes	Newsroom Reporter	
2002	Star Wars: Episode II – Attack of the Clones	Roth-Del Masona	Uncredited
2002	XXX	NSA Agent	
2003	S.W.A.T.	Officer Lennox	Uncredited
2004	Twisted	Mills' Aide	
2005	Coach Carter	Preseason Game Referee	
2005	The Man	Mark	
2006	Freedomland	Desk Sergeant	
2006	The Shaggy Dog	Mercenary	
2006	Black Snake Moan	Deke Woods	
2008	The Man Who Came Back	Junebug	
2009	Angel Wishes: Journey of a Spiritual Healer	Isaac	
2010	Consinsual	Detective Edwards	
2011	Threading Needles	Man at Bathroom Door	

=== Television ===
Year	Title	Role	Notes
1992, 2001	Law & Order	CSU Technician / Lucas	2 episodes
1994	The Cosby Mysteries	Hospital Reporter	Television film
2003	Miss Match	Bailiff	Episode: "Something Nervy"
2004	LAX	Security Guard	Episode: "Out of Control"
2016	The Sin Within	Deacon Eggerton	4 episodes
2018	This Is Us	James	Episode: "The Beginning Is the End Is the Beginning"
2020	The Crack'd Nutz Experiment	Leonard / Virgil Mayhew	Television film
2020	Insecure	Stanley	Episode: "Lowkey Thankful"
