= Spike Lee's unrealized projects =

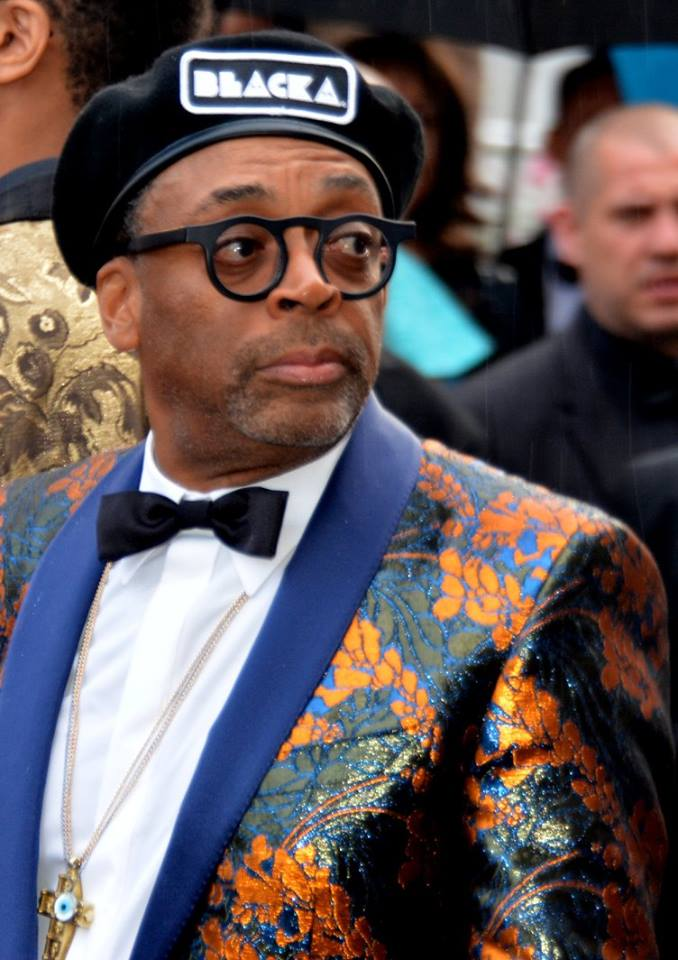
Lee attending the 2018 Cannes Film Festival

During his long career, American filmmaker Spike Lee has worked on a number of projects which never progressed beyond the pre-production stage under his direction. Some of these projects have fallen in development hell or are officially canceled.

== 1980s ==
=== The Messenger ===
In 1984, Lee started working on a project called "The Messenger", which chronicled the story of a bike messenger that becomes the head of his household after the death of his mother. Giancarlo Esposito and Laurence Fishburne were initially set to star in the lead roles, but the film never materialized due to financial struggles he faced related to the production.

== 1990s ==
=== Ace in the Hole remake ===
Sometimes in the 1990s, Lee reportedly wanted to remake 1951's Ace in the Hole, directed by Billy Wilder.

=== Playhouse '90s TV series ===
In 1992, it was reported that Lee had written and was expected to direct an episode of Francis Ford Coppola's planned revival of the anthology drama series Playhouse 90, Playhouse '90s, a series of "live, one-hour dramatic plays" for CBS. The project never came to fruition.

=== Micheaux ===
In the mid-1990s, playwright and screenwriter Robert O'Hara penned an unproduced screenplay on the life of Oscar Micheaux, often regarded as the first major African-American feature filmmaker, which Lee was attached to direct.

== 2000s ==
=== Save Us, Joe Louis ===
In July 2000, Lee acquired the rights to make a film about Joe Louis from a script he wrote with boxing expert Bert Randolph Sugar and scriptwriting legend Budd Schulberg under the title Save Us, Joe Louis. The movie was focused on Louis' fights with Max Schmeling with Arnold Schwarzenegger interested in playing Schmeling. In July 2006, Schulberg mentioned that Lee talked with Terrence Howard to play Louis. The film fell into development hell because Lee didn't get half of the budget he needed. Following the death of Schulberg, Lee continuously reaffirmed his intention to make the film in 2018, 2021, and 2025. "I made a promise to Budd that one day, soon, that we'd get the money, and I'm gonna keep that promise and get that film made."

=== Rent ===
Until 2001, Lee was to direct the film for Miramax. However, budgetary constraints and Lee's insistence on engaging celebrities like Justin Timberlake and Brittany Murphy stalled the project for a time.

=== Selling Time ===
In May 2006, Lee was set to direct 20th Century Fox's supernatural thriller Selling Time, with Tom Cruise in talks to star. In January 2014, D.J. Caruso took over directing the movie from Lee, with Dan McDermott writing a new draft and Will Smith is rumored to star in the movie. However, plans fell in development hell and its fate is unknown after the Acquisition of 21st Century Fox by Disney was completed.

=== NoLa TV series ===
In September 2006, Lee was planning to follow up his HBO documentary When the Levees Broke with a fictionalized dramatic series for NBC set in post-Hurricane Katrina New Orleans. The series, titled NoLa, was being pitched as an ensemble piece centering on a multicultural group of residents from various different backgrounds, attempting to rebuild their lives after the hurricane. Lee planned to executive produce and direct the pilot if NBC decided to move forward with the project, which he developed with writer Sid Quashie.

=== Untitled Michael Jordan documentary ===
In May 2008, Lee was reportedly set to direct a feature-length documentary, centering on Michael Jordan. Lee had previously starred alongside Jordan in a series of Nike commercials, reprising the role of Mars Blackmon, from his debut feature film She's Gotta Have It (1986).The documentary was going to be produced by his own production house, with the NBA financing the development. But, in a 2009 interview with IGN, he reportedly told them to "squash it", effectively dismissing further plans to develop the project.

=== Time Traveler ===
In June 2008, it was announced that Lee was going to adapt Ronald Mallett's memoir Time Traveler: A Scientist’s Personal Mission to Make Time Travel a Reality into a feature film. The film was to have been titled Time Traveler and Lee was to have co-written and directed it. On July 27, 2015, Mallett reported that Lee and screenwriter Ian Harnarine were "in negotiations about how to proceed regarding a feature film of my book, Time Traveler."

=== L.A. Riots ===
In July 2008, Lee was set to direct the film L.A. Riots, with John Ridley and Terry George writing the script and Brian Grazer producing the film. In August 2012, Justin Lin was set to direct L.A. Riots, since Lee didn't get enough money and ended up working on Miracle at St. Anna. There has been no further announcements since.

=== Now the Hell Will Start ===
In 2009, Lee acquired the rights to Brendan Koerner's novel Now the Hell Will Start, a World War II manhunt in the Burmese jungle. However, plans fell into development hell.

== 2010s ==
=== Brooklyn Loves Michael Jackson ===
In April 2010, Samuel L. Jackson announced that Lee showed him a script that he wrote titled Brooklyn Loves Michael Jackson. The script, according to Jackson, was "about these folks who want to have a big concert in a Brooklyn park for Michael. And the new gentrified people that live in the neighborhood are worried about the kind of element that might be coming into the neighborhood." On January 24, 2011, it was announced that Lee scrapped the project.

=== Nagasaki Deadline ===
In June 2010, Lee was announced to direct the thriller Nagasaki Deadline with David Griffiths, Peter Griffiths, William Broyles Jr. writing the script and Lightstorm Entertainment producing the film. However, plans fell into development hell.

=== Untitled Marion Barry biopic ===
In 2011, Lee was set to direct and produce a biopic of Marion Barry with Eddie Murphy set to play Barry, and John Ridley writing the script for HBO Films. There has been no further announcements since.

=== Porgy and Bess remake ===
In August 2012, Lee was in negotiations with the George Gershwin estate to direct the Porgy and Bess remake. The following year, both the Gershwin family and the DuBose Heyward estate announced a remake was in development without Lee's involvement. In 2020, Dee Rees was hired to write and direct the remake.

=== Untitled Stevie Wonder documentary ===
In August 2012, Lee premiered his documentary Bad 25, about the 25th anniversary of Michael Jackson's 1987 album Bad at the 69th Venice International Film Festival. In the documentary, Stevie Wonder, performed a rendition of MJ’s “The Way You Make Me Feel”, and during Lee's Toronto Film Festival QnA in September 2012, he expressed his aspiration to direct a documentary centered on him. Since then, there have been no further announcements regarding the film's development.

=== School Daze Too ===
On July 27, 2013, Lee told Black&Sexy TV that he had a script for a planned contemporary-set sequel to his film School Daze. "Hopefully I can get Laurence Fishburne to play Dap [again]. He'll be the president now of the school," Lee said. "And we would deal with issues around Historically Black Colleges today." According to Lee, the new issues would include homophobia, modern pledging, class issues, color and hair texture. In December the following year, information was leaked by Sony regarding the casting of Drake and Kevin Hart in the film, revealed to be titled School Daze Too.

=== Untitled Clarence Thomas biopic ===
On July 29, 2013, filmmaker Paul Schrader revealed that he reached out to Lee, offering to write a script for him to direct about Clarence Thomas, saying, "If either one of us did it alone, it wouldn't have as much strength to it."

=== Enter the Dragon remake ===
In 2014, Lee was in negotiations to direct the remake of Enter the Dragon with Ken Jeong set to play Lee and Billy Bob Thornton set to play Roper. In 2015, Brett Ratner revealed that he replaced Lee as director, and in 2018, David Leitch was in early talks to direct.

=== Archer TV series ===
In August 2017, it was announced that Lee was developing Archer, a TV series with a "young, black Mark Zuckerberg-like protagonist" who develops a dating app that reads sexual chemistry.

=== Nightwatch ===
By September 2017, Sony Pictures was actively developing a film based on the character Nightwatch for their Sony's Spider-Man Universe, with a script from Edward Ricourt. Sony wanted Lee to direct the film, and he was confirmed to be interested in the project in March 2018, with Cheo Hodari Coker re-writing the script. However, Lee was no longer involved by October.

=== School Daze Broadway musical ===
In February 2018, on a podcast episode, Lee announced that he would be adapting his film School Daze as a musical on Broadway. "People said that from the jump when it came out that this should be a musical," added Lee.

=== Frederick Douglass Now ===
In November 2018, Lee was set up to direct a film version of the stage show by Roger Guenveur Smith, Frederick Douglass Now.

=== Prince of Cats ===
In 2019, Lee closed a deal to direct the long-gestated Prince of Cats film, based on the graphic novel.

== 2020s ==
=== Boner ===
In 2020, studio Entertainment One and Lee were prepping a then-untitled film about the breakthrough of the erectile dysfunction drug Viagra. Lee was to have directed from a screenplay co-written with Kwame Kwei-Armah, based on the 2015 Esquire article "All Rise: The Untold Story of The Guys Who Launched Viagra". Lee described the project as a "dancin', all singin' musical", featuring original songs and music written by Stew Stewart and Heidi Rodewald. In March 2023, Lee called it one of "several projects that are in the pot" and revealed that it would be titled Boner. In 2025, he reaffirmed his intentions to make the film, saying "that's something I've got to get made. Got to get made."

=== Da Saga of Colin Kaepernick documentary ===
In February 2022, it had been reported that Lee was to film a multipart documentary for ESPN on former San Francisco 49ers quarterback Colin Kaepernick, featuring extensive interviews and access to his personal archive. In December of that year, the documentary was given the title of Da Saga of Colin Kaepernick, and Lee revealed he had been working on the series for over a year. By 2025, it was reported that the project will never be released and has been canceled due to "creative differences" among Lee, Kaepernick, and ESPN.

=== Untitled ROTC drama series ===
In November 2022, Lee came aboard as director and executive producer of an untitled coming-of-age drama developed at Amazon Studios. Written by Jalysa Conway and Rebecca Murga, the series was to have been set in the world of an ROTC military program at a major university.

=== Da Understudy ===
In 2023, Lee was circling to direct Da Understudy, with Jonathan Majors attached to star and produce from Westbrook Studios and Amazon Studios. Tom Hanada, Zach Strauss and Tyler Cole wrote the screenplay, based on an original story by Cole about an "understudy of a Broadway production [who] finds a role he's willing to kill for," as reported by Deadline Hollywood. The following year, Variety confirmed that sources close to Amazon had said Majors was dropped from the film.

=== Liberty ===
In 2025, it was reported that Lee was developing and eyeing to direct the comedic military drama Liberty based on a pitch from writers Jalysa Conway and Rebecca Murga. The project was said to be "in the vein" of the 1973 film The Last Detail.

== See also ==
- Spike Lee filmography
