= Calvin Mackie =

American motivational speaker, entrepreneur (born 1967 or 1968)

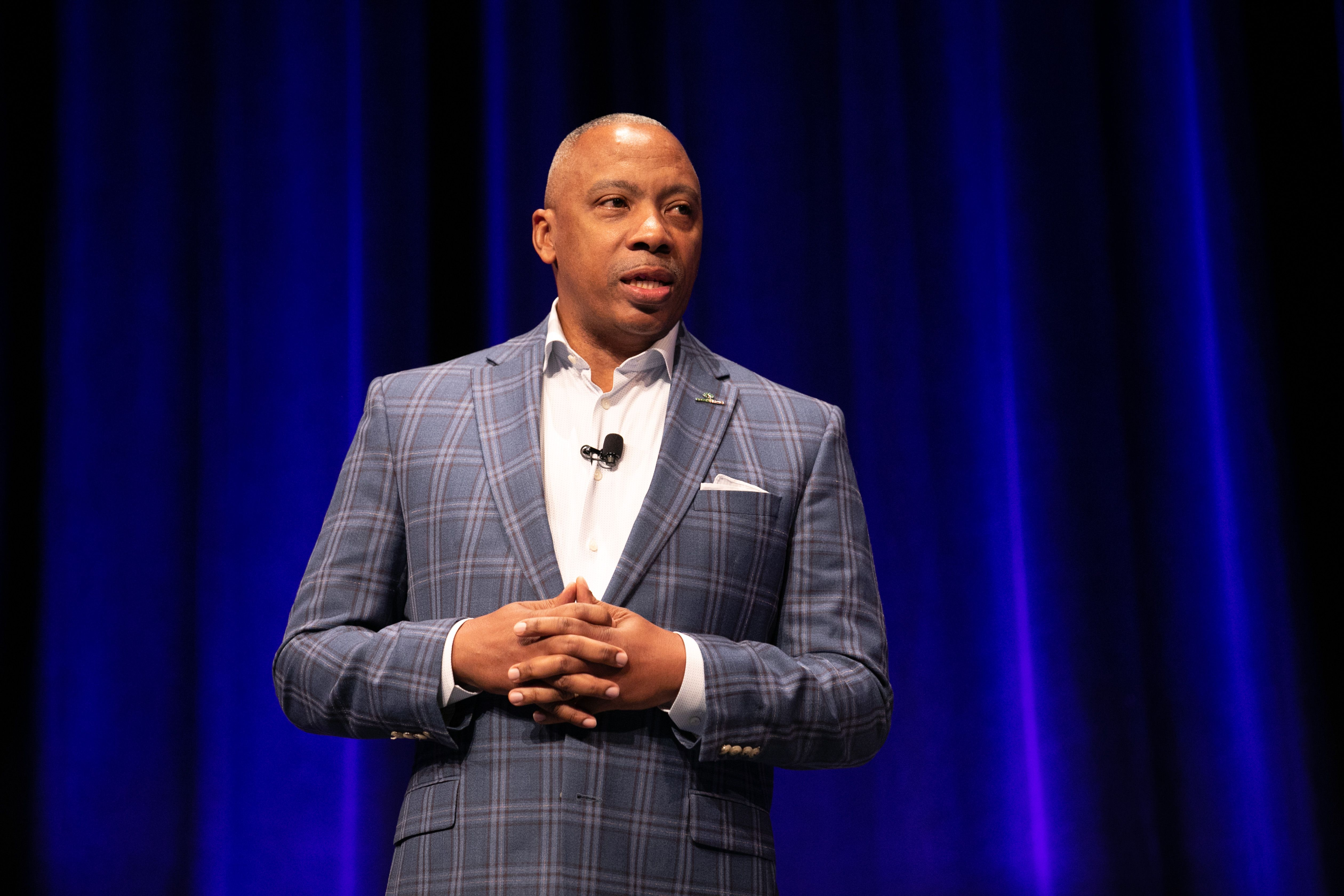
- Mackie in 2022
- Born: 1967 or 1968 (age 57–58); New Orleans, Louisiana, U.S.
- Education: Morehouse College (BS); Georgia Institute of Technology (MS, PhD)
- Spouse: Tracy Mackie
- Children: 2
- Relatives: Anthony Mackie (brother)
- Scientific career
- Fields: Mechanical engineering
- Institutions: Tulane University; Louisiana Recovery Authority
- Thesis: Convective Instability of a Solidification Interface in a Porous Layer (1996)
- Doctoral advisor: Prateen Desai; Carolyn Meyers

Calvin Mackie (born 1967 or 1968) is an American motivational speaker and entrepreneur. He is the older brother of actor Anthony Mackie.

== Education ==
Mackie was born in New Orleans and graduated in 1985 from McDonogh 35 High School, the first high school for African Americans in New Orleans. In 1990, Mackie earned a B.S. in mathematics from Morehouse College and a Bachelor of Mechanical Engineering from Georgia Tech through a dual-degree program. He also completed a M.S. in 1992 and a Ph.D. in 1996, both in mechanical engineering and from Georgia Tech.

== Career ==
=== Academia ===
Following graduation Mackie joined the faculty at Tulane University where he continued to pursue research related to heat transfer, fluid dynamics, energy efficiency and renewable energy until the Engineering Program was discontinued in 2006. In 2002, Mackie was promoted to Associate Professor with tenure. He has published numerous peer-reviewed articles and successfully competed for federal, state and private funding.

In 2004–2005, Mackie was a visiting professor in the Department of Chemical Engineering at the University of Michigan. He is a member of Phi Beta Kappa, Pi Tau Sigma and Tau Beta Pi National Honor Societies, and a Lifetime Member of the National Society of Black Engineers.

Mackie has also worked as a professional speaker. In 1992, he co-founded Channel ZerO, an educational and motivational consulting company; he has presented to civic and educational institutions, and Fortune 500 corporations.

=== Louisiana Recovery Authority ===
Louisiana Governor Kathleen Blanco appointed Mackie to the Louisiana Recovery Authority (LRA), the guiding agency to lead the state's rebuilding efforts following the catastrophic 2005 Hurricanes Katrina and Rita. As an ambassador of the LRA and a guest of the U.S. Embassy, he traveled to the country of Kuwait and appeared on Good Morning Kuwait and in international Arab newspapers. As a resident of pre- and post-Katrina New Orleans, Mackie has also been featured on HBO as a commentator on Spike Lee's documentary on the Katrina disaster When The Levees Broke: A Requiem in Four Parts. He has also appeared on national and local news shows talking about Katrina, including the PBS News Hour with Jim Lehrer, and the Tom Joyner Morning Show.

== Patents and publications ==
In November 1999, Mackie and Benjamin Hall Thomas received a patent (#US5988565A) on a device to retrofit luggage stow bins on 737 and 757 Boeing commercial airliners.

=== Partial bibliography ===
- Mackie, Calvin (March 2001). "Semi-analytic Solutions for Freezing Induced by Evaporative Cooling". International Journal of Heat and Mass Transfer. 44 (6): 1161–1170. Bibcode:2001IJHMT..44.1161H. doi:10.1016/S0017-9310(00)00154-X.
- Mackie, Calvin (August 2001). "Effect of Environmental Phase Characteristics on the Discharge of a Thermal Storage System". Journal of Solar Energy Engineering.
- Mackie, Calvin (June 29, 1999). "Convective Stability of a Particle-laden Fluid System in the Presence of Solidification". International Journal of Heat and Mass Transfer. 43 (9): 1617–1627. doi:10.1016/S0017-9310(99)00226-4.
- Mackie, Calvin (November 2005). A View from the Roof: Lessons for Life and Business. Boston, Massachusetts: Acanthus Publishing. ISBN 978-0-9754810-3-5.

== Awards ==
- 2003 Presidential Award for Excellence in Science, Mathematics and Engineering Mentoring
- 2003 National Title - "One Distinguished Graduate for Louisiana"
- 2002 Black Engineer of the Year Award for College Level Educator
- 2002 New Orleans Data News Weekly Trailblazer Award
- Pi Tau Sigma/ASME Excellence in Teaching Award in Mechanical Engineering for 2000 and 2002
