= Brendan Loy =

American blogger

Brendan Loy is an American blogger, husband, and father of three.

Loy's first blog, titled The Irish Trojan's Blog, gained moderate attention on the Internet and in some media outlets for his posting on Hurricane Katrina. He currently runs two blogs. His primary blog, "The Living Room Times," covers politics, sports, news, weather, and other topics. His secondary blog, "The Pioneer Pulse," is devoted to covering the Denver Pioneers men's basketball team.

Loy worked for the Daily Trojan during his undergraduate studies at the University of Southern California, but Loy states that he was "forced to resign" from an editorial position. Loy has not stated the reasons for his resignation.

Loy is a native of Newington, Connecticut. He graduated from the University of Southern California in 2003 with a bachelor's degree in journalism and political science and Notre Dame Law School in 2007. He and his wife Becky have three daughters. He is currently a practicing attorney in Colorado.

== Hurricane Katrina coverage ==
Loy's site became the "most frequently cited hurricane-related blog" for Katrina-related coverage, according to Intelliseek's Blogpulse.

Due to his hurricane coverage, Loy was the subject of articles in The New York Times, The Washington Post, and was covered by Slate's Mickey Kaus. Loy also appeared briefly in Spike Lee's 2006 HBO documentary film "When the Levees Broke: A Requiem in Four Acts."

== Other media attention ==
Loy also authored a piece for Sports Illustrated on Campus titled "The Perfect Bracket: How to come out on top in your NCAA tournament pool."
