= Victoria Holt Takamine =

Hawaiian kumu hula, cultural advocate, and activist

- Born: Victoria Holt Takamine; 1952 (age 73–74); Hawaiʻi, United States
- Other names: Vicky Holt Takamine
- Occupations: Kumu hula, cultural advocate, activist
- Years active: 1970s–present
- Organization: PA‘I Foundation
- Known for: Founder of PA‘I Foundation; cultural activism
- Awards: First Peoples Fund Community Spirit Award (2013); Gish Prize (2024)
- Website: paifoundation.org

Victoria Holt Takamine is a Native Hawaiian kumu hula (hula teacher), cultural practitioner, and activist. She is the founder of the PA‘I Foundation, an organization dedicated to perpetuating Native Hawaiian cultural traditions, and a nationally recognized advocate for Indigenous rights and cultural preservation.

== Early life and education ==
Takamine was born and raised on Oʻahu, Hawaiʻi to Charles Holt and Frances Kalei Heath. She trained in hula under renowned kumu hula Maiki Aiu Lake and graduated through the traditional ʻūniki process in 1975. She attended, and graduated from, Kamehameha Schools, Kapālama, later earning a Bachelor's and Master's degree in dance ethnology from the University of Hawaiʻi at Mānoa.

== Career ==
Takamine is the kumu hula of Hālau Pua Aliʻi ʻIlima, which she founded in 1977. Her hālau has performed in numerous cultural events, including the Merrie Monarch Festival. She is known for using hula not just as a cultural practice but also as a medium for political activism. Although she is retired from the University of Hawaiʻi, she continues to teach through workshops hosted at the university's various campuses

== Advocacy ==
In 2001, Takamine established the PA‘I Foundation, a nonprofit organization to support Native Hawaiian artists and cultural practitioners, that now includes affordable housing for artists through a partnership with Artspace. She is a co-founder of the MAMo: Maoli Arts Movement, an annual festival that began in 2016, that highlights Native Hawaiian visual and performing arts.

She has also led efforts to protect Native Hawaiian burial sites and advocated for Native Hawaiian self-determination, notably participating in demonstrations and public education around land use and cultural preservation. Takamine was a leading figure in protests against the desecration of Native Hawaiian sacred sites, including opposition to construction projects that threatened iwi kūpuna (ancestral remains).

Takamine has served on the boards and advisory groups of numerous cultural and community organizations. In 2024, she was appointed as the first-ever Cultural Adviser to the Doris Duke Foundation’s Shangri La Museum of Islamic Art, Culture & Design, bringing her expertise in Native Hawaiian cultural practices to an institution rooted in multicultural and cross-cultural engagement.

Through her leadership of PA‘I Foundation, she has built partnerships with local and national arts organizations, health care systems, and educational institutions. She has collaborated with entities such as Hawai‘i Pacific Health to integrate Native Hawaiian cultural values and practices into holistic health and wellness initiatives. Her advocacy often emphasizes the importance of place-based knowledge and ancestral wisdom in shaping sustainable futures for Indigenous communities.

As a respected kumu hula and Hawaiian advocate, Takamine advances cultural sovereignty through education, policy advocacy, and artistic expression. Her work has been instrumental in bridging the arts and activism, using hula and Native Hawaiian aesthetics to promote awareness of Indigenous rights and social justice.

== Awards and honors ==
In 2024, Takamine was awarded The Dorothy and Lillian Gish Prize for her "outstanding contribution to the beauty of the world and to mankind’s enjoyment and understanding of life."
