= If God Is Willing and da Creek Don't Rise =

- Directed by: Spike Lee
- Theme music composer: Terence Blanchard
- Country of origin: United States
- Original language: English

Production
- Producers: Spike Lee; Samuel D. Pollard
- Cinematography: Cliff Charles
- Editor: Geeta Gandbhir
- Running time: 255 minutes
- Production company: 40 Acres and a Mule Filmworks
- Budget: $2.4 million

Original release
- Network: HBO
- Release: August 23, 2010

If God Is Willing and da Creek Don't Rise is a 2010 documentary film directed by Spike Lee, as a follow-up to his 2006 HBO documentary film, When the Levees Broke: A Requiem in Four Acts. The film looks into the proceeding years since Hurricane Katrina struck the New Orleans and Gulf Coast region, and also focuses on the 2010 BP oil spill in the Gulf of Mexico and its effect on the men and women who work along the shores of the gulf. Many of the participants in Levees were also featured in this documentary.

It won a Peabody Award in 2010 "for ambitiously chronicling one of the largest disasters in American history, interrogating the well-known narratives and investigating other stories that could have easily fallen through the cracks."

== Synopsis ==
Featured in the documentary are stories about New Orleans' rebuilding efforts in the aftermath of Hurricane Katrina, including the shuttering and demolition of four public housing projects in the city. The documentary also goes into the story of how the Federal Bureau of Investigation looked into allegations of brutality and cover-ups within the New Orleans Police Department.

Another element in the documentary was the NFL's New Orleans Saints, a team long known for losing for the better half of its 43-year history, as they defeated New Orleans native Peyton Manning and his Indianapolis Colts in Super Bowl XLIV, and seeing the region celebrating the victory which took place days prior to the annual Mardi Gras celebration.

Also included were a federal court ruling in February 2009 that held the United States Army Corps of Engineers responsible for poor maintenance of the Mississippi River – Gulf Outlet Canal, which caused the flooding of New Orleans and its surrounding communities during Hurricane Katrina. Some native New Orleanians who re-located to the Houston area post-Katrina were also interviewed, and each tells the story about their lives in the years since the hurricane. Ray Nagin and Mitch Landrieu, the former and current mayors of New Orleans respectively, were also interviewed, specifically about the portion of the documentary which saw Nagin unseated as mayor after eight years, due to his being ineligible to run for a third term.

== Interviewees ==
(partial list)

- Shelton "Shakespear" Alexander, New Orleans native, rapper, and poet
- Terence Blanchard, New Orleans–based Grammy-winning jazz musician
- Kathleen Babineaux Blanco, former governor of Louisiana (2004–2008)
- Douglas Brinkley, Professor of History at Tulane University, historian
- Karen Carter, New Orleans politician, member of the Louisiana State Legislature
- Bobby Jindal, governor of Louisiana (2008–2016)
- Mitch Landrieu, mayor of New Orleans (2010–2018)
- Phyllis Montana LeBlanc, New Orleans native and actress
- Dr. Calvin Mackie, Mechanical Engineering Faculty-Tulane University and Founder of Channel Zero; also appointed to Louisiana Recovery Authority
- Jacques Morial, brother of former New Orleans mayor Marc Morial and community activist
- Marc Morial, former mayor of New Orleans (1994–2002)
- Ray Nagin, former mayor of New Orleans (2002–2010)
- Annise Parker, mayor of Houston, Texas (Since 2010)
- Sean Penn, actor and activist
- Wendell Pierce, New Orleans native and actor
- Brad Pitt, actor and activist
- Garland Robinette, New Orleans journalist and radio host
