= Kyme (actress) =

American actress

- Born: November 21, 1962 (age 62); United States
- Occupation: Actress
- Spouse: Otis Sallid (1996-present)

Kyme (born November 21, 1962) is an American film and television actress. She is mostly remembered for her portrayal of "Rachel Meadows" in the 1988 film School Daze. Her television credits include guest appearances on Chicago Hope, The Parkers, Frasier, NYPD Blue and 24.

== Filmography ==
Film
Year	Film	Role	Notes
1988	School Daze	Rachel Meadows	Film
1990	Kojak: It's Always Something	Vera Stephenson	
1998-1999	Chicago Hope	Reporter	6 episodes
1999	The Parkers	Pilar	Episode: Kimberlale
2000	Unauthorized: The Mary Kay Letourneau Story		TV movie
2000	Judging Amy	DCF Melanie Richardson	Episode: Drawing the Line
2000	Geppetto	Featured	
2000	Frasier	Lucy	Episode: The Great Crane Robbery
2001	NYPD Blue	Kara Lowell	Episode: Dying to Testify
2000-2002	Providence	Mrs. Winthrop/Nurse Lynn	2 episodes
2003	JAG	Lead PSD Technician	Episode: The One That Got Away
2003	The Guardian	Nicole Lakey	Episode: Believe
2004	24	Alice	Episode: Day 3: 7:00 a.m.-8:00 a.m.
2005	Malcolm in the Middle	Meryl	Episode: Billboard
2005	E-Ring		Episode: Tribes
2005	Single White Female 2: The Psycho	Doctor	
