= The Dorothy and Lillian Gish Prize =

American annual arts award

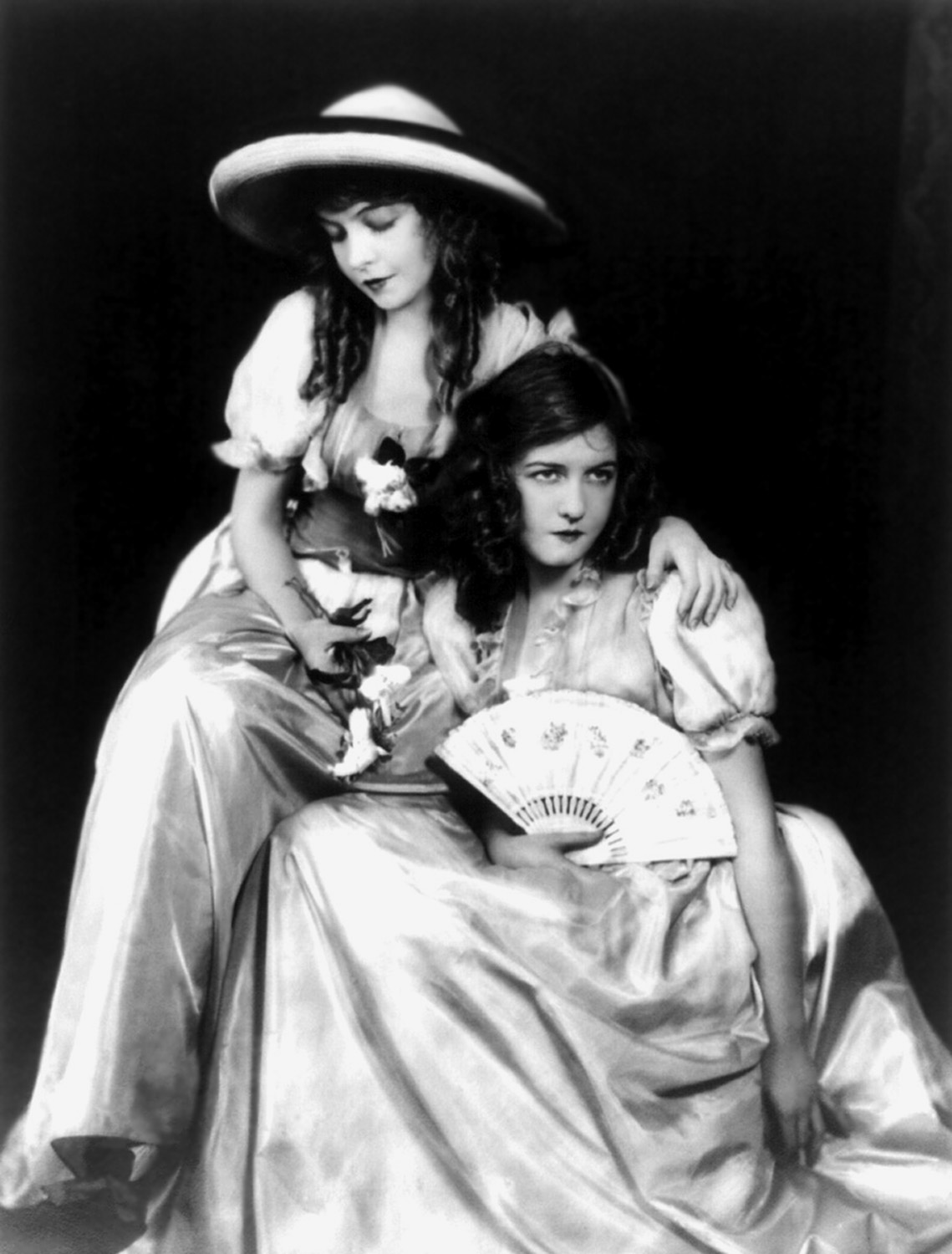
Dorothy and Lillian Gish

The Dorothy and Lillian Gish Prize or Gish Prize is given annually to "a man or woman who has made an outstanding contribution to the beauty of the world and to mankind's enjoyment and understanding of life". It is among the most prestigious and one of the richest prizes in the American arts. The 2024 award was for over $450,000. The founders Dorothy Gish (1898–1968) and Lillian Gish (1893–1993) were sisters, famous as actresses from the silent era of film and mid-century theater. The prize was established in Lillian Gish's will, in which she wrote, "It is my desire, by establishing this prize, to give recipients of the prize the recognition they deserve, to bring attention to their contributions to society and encourage others to follow in their path." It was funded in 1994 by the Dorothy and Lillian Gish Prize Trust and is administered by JPMorgan Chase Bank.

== Recipients ==
- 1994: Frank Gehry, architect
- 1995: Ingmar Bergman, film director
- 1996: Robert Wilson, artist and director
- 1997: Bob Dylan, singer, songwriter
- 1998: Isabel Allende, author
- 1999: Arthur Miller, author and playwright
- 2000: Merce Cunningham, dancer and choreographer
- 2001: Jennifer Tipton, lighting designer
- 2002: Lloyd Richards, theater director
- 2003: Bill T. Jones, dancer and choreographer
- 2004: Ornette Coleman, jazz innovator
- 2005: Peter Sellars, theater, opera and festival director
- 2006: Shirin Neshat, filmmaker
- 2007: Laurie Anderson, artist
- 2008: Robert Redford, actor
- 2009: Pete Seeger, musician
- 2010: Chinua Achebe, writer
- 2011: Trisha Brown, dancer, choreographer and artistic director
- 2012: Anna Deavere Smith, author, actor, educator
- 2013: Spike Lee, director, producer, writer, teacher
- 2014: Maya Lin, artist, architect
- 2015: Suzan-Lori Parks, playwright, screenwriter
- 2016: Elizabeth LeCompte, theater director
- 2017: Meredith Monk, composer, singer, director, choreographer
- 2018: Gustavo Dudamel, violinist, conductor, music director
- 2019: Walter Hood, artist, designer, urbanist
- 2020: Ava DuVernay, filmmaker
- 2021: Sonia Sanchez, poet
- 2022: Jawole Willa Jo Zollar, dancer and choreographer
- 2023: Thelma Golden, Museum Director and Chief Curator of the Studio Museum in Harlem
- 2024: Vicky Holt Takamine, kumu hula (master teacher)
- 2025: Rosalba Rolón, actress, director, dramaturg, theater founder, Artistic Director of Pregones/Puerto Rican Traveling Theater
- 2026 Louise Erdrich, author and bookstore owner
