= When the Levees Broke =

2006 American documentary series

- The logo for the documentary, depicting a damaged New Orleans street sign.
- Directed by: Spike Lee
- Theme music composer: Terence Blanchard
- Country of origin: United States
- Original language: English
- No. of episodes: 4

Production
- Producers: Spike Lee; Samuel D. Pollard
- Cinematography: Cliff Charles
- Editors: Geeta Gandbhir; Nancy Novack; Samuel D. Pollard
- Running time: 255 minutes
- Production company: 40 Acres and a Mule Filmworks
- Budget: US$2 million

Original release
- Network: HBO
- Release: August 21 – August 22, 2006

Related
- If God Is Willing and Da Creek Don't Rise

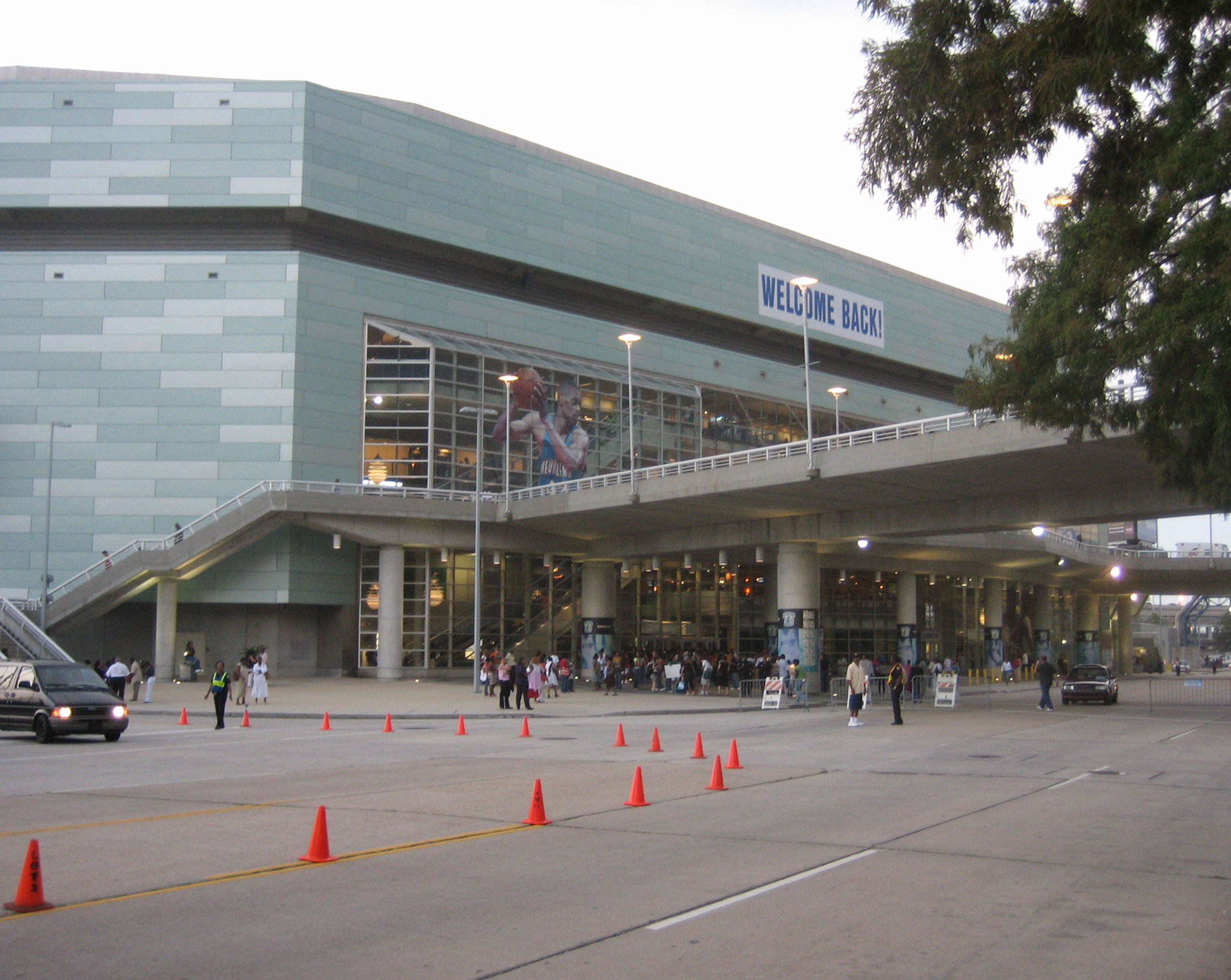
New Orleans Arena on August 16, 2006, the day of the premiere of the film.

When the Levees Broke: A Requiem in Four Acts is a 2006 documentary film directed by Spike Lee about the devastation of New Orleans, Louisiana following the failure of the levees during Hurricane Katrina. It premiered at the New Orleans Arena on August 16, 2006 and was first aired on HBO the following week. The television premiere aired in two parts on August 21 and 22, 2006 on HBO. It has been described by Sheila Nevins, chief of HBO's documentary unit, as "one of the most important films HBO has ever made." The title is a reference to the blues tune "When the Levee Breaks" by Kansas Joe McCoy and Memphis Minnie about the Great Mississippi Flood of 1927.

The documentary was screened at the 63rd Venice International Film Festival on August 31 and September 1, 2006. It won the Orizzonti Documentary Prize and one of two FIPRESCI awards. It was also shown at the 2006 Toronto International Film Festival on September 15 and September 16, 2006. It won three awards at the 59th Primetime Emmy Awards and received a Peabody Award.

The documentary is based on news video footage and still photos of Katrina and its aftermath, interspersed with interviews. Interviewees include politicians, journalists, historians, engineers, and many residents of various parts of New Orleans and the surrounding areas, who give first hand accounts of their experiences with the levee failures and the aftermath.

In the style of Michael Apted's Up series (a documentary series that interviews Apted's subjects every seven years), Lee planned to interview his featured subjects in Levees at least once more. In August 2010, HBO aired Lee's documentary series, If God Is Willing and Da Creek Don't Rise, which chronicles how New Orleans and the Gulf Coast area have fared in the five years following Hurricane Katrina. Lee also directed the third episode of the 2025 Netflix documentary series titled "Katrina: Come Hell and High Water".

== Synopsis ==
The film focuses on the changed lives of New Orleans residents after Hurricane Katrina hit. The film shows residents in the midst of disaster dealing with death, devastation and disease. Spike Lee said about the film:

New Orleans is fighting for its life. These are not people who will disappear quietly — they're accustomed to hardship and slights, and they'll fight for New Orleans. This film will showcase the struggle for New Orleans by focusing on the profound loss, as well as the indomitable spirit of New Orleaneans.

This documentary is Spike Lee's third, preceded by 4 Little Girls (1997), about the Birmingham church bombing of 1963; and Jim Brown: All-American (2002), about the football player.

Shooting for the film began a few months after the hurricane hit, after Thanksgiving, when Lee and his camera crew took the first of eight trips to New Orleans. They conducted interviews and taped footage for the film. Lee hoped to hear varying opinions of the storm and responses to the storm's destruction. He interviewed nearly 100 people of diverse backgrounds and opinions for his film.

== Interviewees ==
People appearing in interviews include:

- Glen David Andrews, musician
- John M. Barry, author and member of Southeast Louisiana Flood Protection Authority
- Harry Belafonte, actor and singer
- Terence Blanchard, jazz musician
- Kathleen Blanco, governor of Louisiana
- Douglas Brinkley, professor of history at Tulane University
- Karen Carter, New Orleans politician, member of the Louisiana State Legislature
- Louella Givens, representative, second district of Louisiana Board of Elementary and Secondary Education
- Cynthia Hedge-Morrell, member of the New Orleans City Council
- Donnell Herrington, survivor of a post-Katrina shooting in Algiers Point
- Mary Landrieu, senior U.S. Senator from Louisiana
- Mitch Landrieu, Lieutenant Governor of Louisiana
- Brendan Loy, American Katrina Blogger
- Dr. Calvin Mackie, faculty member of Tulane University and founder of Channel Zero; member of the Louisiana Recovery Authority
- Wynton Marsalis, musician
- Dr. Hassan Mashriqui, researcher, Louisiana State University (LSU) Hurricane Center
- Marc Morial, former Mayor of New Orleans and President and CEO of the National Urban League
- Arthur Morrell, New Orleans politician and member of the Louisiana State Legislature
- Ray Nagin, mayor of New Orleans
- Soledad O'Brien, television journalist
- Sean Penn, actor and activist
- Wendell Pierce, New Orleans actor
- Garland Robinette, New Orleans journalist and radio host
- Junior Rodriguez, president of the St. Bernard Parish Council
- Rev. Al Sharpton, civil rights activist
- Dinerral Shavers, musician
- Ivor van Heerden, deputy director of the Louisiana State University Hurricane Center
- Kanye West, music producer and rapper
- Phyllis Montana LeBlanc, resident of New Orleans East.

== Music ==
The first installment opens with a photo and film montage of historic and recent New Orleans scenes, with a soundtrack of Louis Armstrong performing Louis Alter's "Do You Know What It Means to Miss New Orleans". At the end of the last episode is a similar montage with Fats Domino's "Walking to New Orleans" on the soundtrack.

The film's original score is by Terence Blanchard, a New Orleans-born trumpeter who appears in the film, with his mother and aunt, as they return to their flooded home. Not being the first time that Terence Blanchard had worked as a composer for a film by Spike Lee, Blanchard had worked to create compositions of a more universal genre of jazz as opposed to New Orleans style jazz in order to reach masses of audiences to raise awareness of the results of New Orleans after Hurricane Katrina. In general, the music he had composed was written under the context of respecting those who were directly affected by the catastrophe and with intentions of providing contexts to allow audiences to sympathize with those affected.

== Awards ==
When the Levees Broke won three Emmy Awards: Exceptional Merit in Nonfiction Filmmaking, Outstanding Directing for Nonfiction Programming, and Outstanding Picture Editing for Nonfiction Programming.

It received a 2006 Peabody Award from the University of Georgia for being an "epic document of destruction and broken promises and a profound work of art" and "an uncompromising analysis of the events that precede and follow Hurricane Katrina's assault on New Orleans" that "tells the story with an unparalleled diversity of voices and sources."

It won the 2007 NAACP Image Award for Outstanding Television Movie, Mini-Series or Dramatic Special. At the 63rd Venice International Film Festival the film was awarded the Horizons award in the documentary category. The film was also selected as part of the 2008 Whitney Biennial.

== Points made by the film ==
The film focuses on the suffering of those affected by the disaster and their will to survive. Additionally, it suggests that the disaster in New Orleans was preventable, caused by levees poorly designed by the United States Army Corps of Engineers, and the suffering afterward was compounded by failures at all levels of government, most severely at the State level. These points are in line with mainstream investigations, including the bipartisan U.S. Congressional report, A Failure of Initiative, and the Army Corps of Engineers' own studies.

== See also ==
- 2005 levee failures in Greater New Orleans
- Criticism of the government response to Hurricane Katrina
