= Joe's Bed-Stuy Barbershop: We Cut Heads =

- Title screen
- Directed by: Spike Lee
- Written by: Spike Lee
- Produced by: Spike Lee; Zimmie Shelton
- Starring: Monty Ross
- Cinematography: Ernest R. Dickerson
- Edited by: Spike Lee
- Music by: Bill Lee
- Production companies: 40 Acres & A Mule Filmworks, New York University (NYU)
- Distributed by: First Run Features
- Release date: March 27, 1983 (New York New Directors/New Films Festival)
- Running time: 60 minutes
- Country: United States
- Language: English

Joe's Bed-Stuy Barbershop: We Cut Heads is a 1983 student film by American filmmaker Spike Lee. Lee submitted the film as his master's degree thesis at the Tisch School of the Arts.

== Production ==
Lee's classmates Ang Lee and Ernest R. Dickerson worked on the film as assistant director and cinematographer, respectively. The film was the first student film to be showcased in Lincoln Center's New Directors New Films Festival. Spike Lee's father, Bill Lee, composed the score. The film won a Student Academy Award.

== Plot ==
The film is set in a Bedford–Stuyvesant, Brooklyn barbershop where customers come to hang out, discuss various issues, and get a haircut. The manager, Zack, took over after Joe was killed by a gangster who used the shop as a front for a numbers racket. Zack wants to keep the shop legitimate but the gangster wants to continue the deal he had with Joe.

== See also ==
- American Taboo – another student film that also won the Student Academy Award the same year as Spike's film
- 1983 in film
