= Spike Lee =

American filmmaker (born 1957)

- Lee in 2025
- Born: Shelton Jackson Lee; March 20, 1957 (age 69); Atlanta, Georgia, U.S.
- Education: Morehouse College (BA); New York University (MFA)
- Occupations: Director; producer; screenwriter; actor
- Years active: 1977–present
- Organization: 40 Acres and a Mule Filmworks
- Works: Filmography; unrealized projects
- Spouse: Tonya Lewis (m. 1993)
- Children: 2
- Father: Bill Lee
- Relatives: Joie Lee (sister); Cinqué Lee (brother); Malcolm D. Lee (cousin)
- Awards: Full list

Shelton Jackson "Spike" Lee (born March 20, 1957) is an American filmmaker and actor. Cited by various publications as one of the most important filmmakers of the late 20th century, his work explores issues including race relations, issues within the black community, the role of media in contemporary life, urban crime and poverty. Lee has received numerous accolades including an Academy Award, a British Academy Film Award, and four Emmy Awards, as well as nominations for three Golden Globe Awards and a Grammy Award.

Lee studied filmmaking at Morehouse College and New York University Tisch School of the Arts, where he directed the student film Joe's Bed-Stuy Barbershop: We Cut Heads (1983), which won a Student Academy Award. Under his production company, 40 Acres and a Mule Filmworks, he has produced more than 35 films, including his own. Lee made his directorial debut with the comedy She's Gotta Have It (1986) before making his seminal film Do the Right Thing (1989), earning a nomination for the Academy Award for Best Original Screenplay. He has since directed the historical epic Malcolm X (1992), and the crime dramedy BlacKkKlansman (2018), the latter of which earned him the Academy Award for Best Adapted Screenplay.

Lee has also written and directed films such as School Daze (1988), Mo' Better Blues (1990), Jungle Fever (1991), Crooklyn (1994), Clockers (1995), Bamboozled (2000), 25th Hour (2002), Inside Man (2006), Chi-Raq (2015), Da 5 Bloods (2020), and Highest 2 Lowest (2025). He has also acted in eleven of his feature films and directed documentary projects including 4 Little Girls (1997), which was nominated for the Academy Award for Best Documentary Feature Film. He directed the HBO series When the Levees Broke (2006), which won two Primetime Emmy Awards, as well as If God Is Willing and da Creek Don't Rise (2010) and the David Byrne concert film American Utopia (2020).

Lee's honors include the Honorary BAFTA Award in 2002, an Honorary César in 2003, the Academy Honorary Award in 2015, and the National Medal of Arts in 2023. Five of his films (Note: These films are Do the Right Thing (1989), Bamboozled (2000), Malcolm X (1992), 4 Little Girls (1997), and She's Gotta Have It (1986).) have been selected by the Library of Congress for preservation in the National Film Registry as "culturally, historically, or aesthetically significant". He received a Gala Tribute from the Film Society of Lincoln Center, three Peabody Awards, and the Gish Prize. His films have featured breakthrough performances from actors such as Denzel Washington, Laurence Fishburne, Samuel L. Jackson, Giancarlo Esposito, Rosie Perez, Delroy Lindo, John Turturro, and John David Washington.

== Early life, family, and education ==
Shelton Jackson Lee was born on March 20, 1957, in Atlanta, Georgia, to Jacqueline Carroll (née Shelton), a teacher of arts and black literature, and William James Edwards Lee III, a jazz musician and composer. He has five younger siblings, three of whom (Joie, David, and Cinqué) have worked in many different positions in his films. A fourth, Christopher, died in 2014. His youngest sibling is half-brother Arnold. Director Malcolm D. Lee is his cousin. When he was a child, the family moved from Atlanta to Brooklyn, New York. His mother nicknamed him "Spike" during his childhood. He attended John Dewey High School in Brooklyn's Gravesend neighborhood.

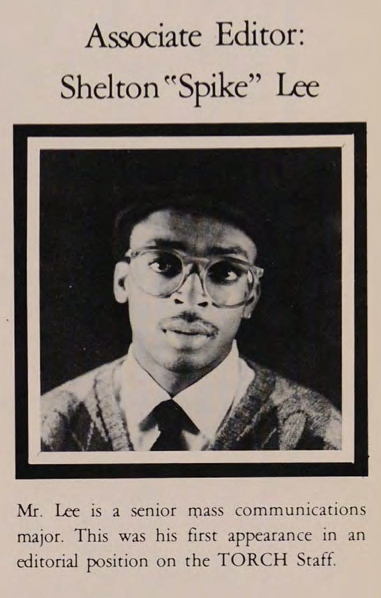
Lee in the Morehouse College's 1979 yearbook

Lee enrolled in Morehouse College, a historically black college in Atlanta, where he made his first student film, Last Hustle in Brooklyn. He took film courses at Clark Atlanta University and graduated with a B.A. in mass communication from Morehouse in 1979. He did graduate work at New York University's Tisch School of the Arts, where he earned a Master of Fine Arts in film and television in 1982.

=== David Lee ===
David Lee, a younger brother of Spike, is a still photographer, and has done the still photography for all of his older brother's feature films before 2013 with the exception of Get on the Bus and He Got Game. Other films he has done still photography for include The Preacher's Wife, The Best Man, Pollock, Made, Eternal Sunshine of the Spotless Mind, and American Gangster, and the television series The Wire.

== Career ==
=== 1983–1990: Early work and breakthrough ===
In 1983, Lee premiered his first independent short film, titled Joe's Bed-Stuy Barbershop: We Cut Heads. Lee submitted the film as his master's degree thesis at the Tisch School of the Arts. Lee's classmates Ang Lee and Ernest R. Dickerson worked on the film as assistant director and cinematographer, respectively. The film was the first student film to be showcased in Lincoln Center's New Directors New Films Festival. Lee's father, Bill Lee, composed the score. The film won a Student Academy Award.

In 1985, Lee began work on his first feature film, She's Gotta Have It. The black-and-white film concerns a young woman (played by Tracy Camilla Johns) who is seeing three men, and the feelings this arrangement provokes. The film was Lee's first feature-length film, and launched Lee's career. Lee wrote, directed, produced, starred and edited the film with a budget of $175,000, he shot the film in two weeks. When the film was released in 1986, it grossed over $7 million at the U.S. box office. New York Times film critic A.O. Scott wrote that the film "ushered in (along with Jim Jarmusch's Stranger Than Paradise) the American independent film movement of the 1980s. It was also a groundbreaking film for African-American filmmakers and a welcome change in the representation of blacks in American cinema, depicting men and women of color not as pimps and whores, but as intelligent, upscale urbanites." He followed this with the musical drama School Daze (1988).

In 1989, Lee made perhaps his most seminal film, Do the Right Thing, which focused on a Brooklyn neighborhood's simmering racial tension on a hot summer day. The film's cast included Lee, Danny Aiello, Bill Nunn, Ossie Davis, Ruby Dee, Giancarlo Esposito, Rosie Perez, John Turturro, Martin Lawrence and Samuel L. Jackson. The film gained critical acclaim as one of the best films of the year from film critics including both Gene Siskel and Roger Ebert who ranked the film as the best of 1989, and later in their top 10 films of the decade (No. 6 for Siskel and No. 4 for Ebert). Ebert later added the film to his list of The Great Movies.

To many people's surprise, the film was not nominated for Best Picture or Best Director at the 62nd Academy Awards. The film only earned two Academy Award nominations for Best Original Screenplay—Lee's first Oscar nomination—and for Best Supporting Actor for Aiello. At the academy ceremony Kim Basinger, who was a presenter that evening, stated that Do the Right Thing also deserved a Best Picture nomination stating, "We've got five great films here, and they are great for one reason, because they tell the truth, but there is one film missing from this list because ironically it might tell the biggest truth of all and that's Do the Right Thing". The film that did win Best Picture was Driving Miss Daisy, a film that focused on race relations between an elderly Jewish woman (Jessica Tandy) and her driver (Morgan Freeman). Lee said in an April 7, 2006, interview with New York magazine that the other film's success, which he thought was based on safe stereotypes, hurt him more than if his film had not been nominated for an award.

=== 1990–1999: Established director ===
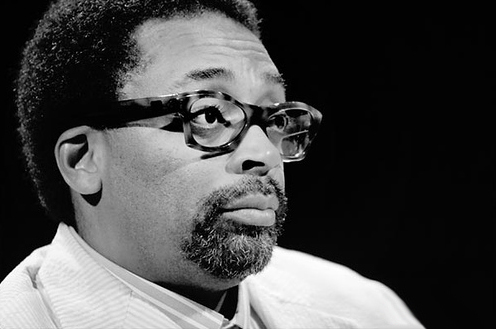
Lee c. 1990s

In 1990, Lee had his first collaboration with Denzel Washington in Mo' Better Blues. After the release of Mo' Better Blues, Lee was accused of antisemitism by the Anti-Defamation League and several film critics. They criticized the characters of the club owners Josh and Moe Flatbush, described as "Shylocks". Lee denied the charge, explaining that he wrote those characters in order to depict how black artists struggled against exploitation. Lee said that Lew Wasserman, Sidney Sheinberg, or Tom Pollock, the Jewish heads of MCA and Universal Studios, were unlikely to allow antisemitic content in a film they produced. He said he could not make an antisemitic film because Jews run Hollywood, and "that's a fact". His next film was Jungle Fever (1991), for which Samuel L. Jackson won acclaim for his performance as a crack addict.

In 1992, Spike released his biographical epic film Malcolm X based on the Autobiography of Malcolm X, starring Denzel Washington as the famed civil rights leader. The film dramatizes key events in Malcolm X's life: his criminal career, his incarceration, his conversion to Islam, his ministry as a member of the Nation of Islam and his later falling out with the organization, his marriage to Betty X, his pilgrimage to Mecca and reevaluation of his views concerning whites, and his assassination on February 21, 1965. Defining childhood incidents, including his father's death, his mother's mental illness, and his experiences with racism are dramatized in flashbacks. The film received widespread critical acclaim including from critic Roger Ebert, who ranked the film No. 1 on his Top 10 list for 1992 and described the film as "one of the great screen biographies, celebrating the sweep of an American life that bottomed out in prison before its hero reinvented himself." Ebert and Martin Scorsese, who was sitting in for late At the Movies co-host Gene Siskel, both ranked Malcolm X among the ten best films of the 1990s. Denzel Washington's portrayal of Malcolm X in particular was widely praised and he was nominated for the Academy Award for Best Actor. Washington lost to Al Pacino (Scent of a Woman), a decision which Lee criticized, saying "I'm not the only one who thinks Denzel was robbed on that one."

External videos
- Presentation by Lee at the New York University's Black Genius series, October 18, 1996, C-SPAN

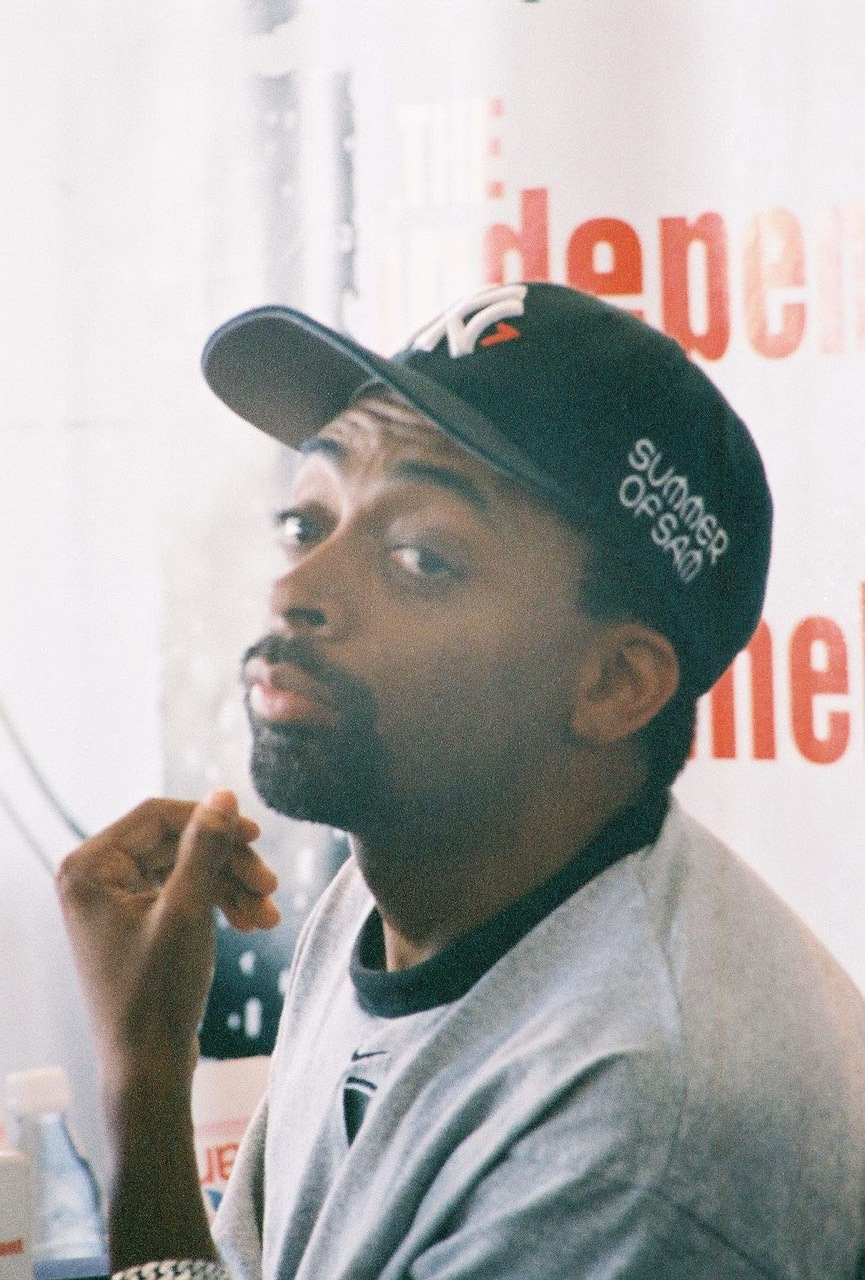
Lee at the 1999 Cannes Film Festival

Lee next directed Crooklyn (1994), a semi-autobiographical film which he co-wrote with his siblings Joie Lee and Cinqué Lee. He followed this with the films Clockers (1995) and Girl 6 and Get on the Bus (both 1996). His 1997 documentary 4 Little Girls, about the girls killed in the 16th Street Baptist Church bombing in Birmingham, Alabama, in 1963, was nominated for the Academy Award for Best Feature Documentary. In 2017, the film was selected for preservation in the United States National Film Registry by the Library of Congress as being "culturally, historically, or aesthetically significant". He had his third collaboration with Denzel Washington on the sports drama He Got Game (1998). He followed this with Summer of Sam (1999), based on the Son of Sam murders.

=== 2000–2014: Studio films and career fluctuations ===
In 2000, Lee directed Bamboozled (2000), a satire about a modern televised minstrel show. He followed this with 25th Hour (2002) starring Edward Norton and Philip Seymour Hoffman which opened to positive reviews, with several critics since having named it one of the best films of its decade. Film critic Roger Ebert added the film to his "Great Movies" list on December 16, 2009. A. O. Scott, Richard Roeper and Roger Ebert all put it on their "best films of the decade" lists. It was later named the 26th greatest film since 2000 in a BBC poll of 177 critics. The film was also a financial success earning almost $24 million against a $5 million budget. He followed 25th Hour with She Hate Me (2004), which received negative reviews.

In 2006, Lee directed Inside Man starring Denzel Washington, Jodie Foster, Clive Owen, Chiwetel Ejiofor, Willem Dafoe and Christopher Plummer. The film was an unusual film for Lee considering it was a studio heist thriller. The film was a critical and financial success earning $186 million off a $45 million budget. Empire gave the film four stars out of five, concluding, "It's certainly a Spike Lee film, but no Spike Lee Joint. Still, he's delivered a pacy, vigorous and frequently masterful take on a well-worn genre. Thanks to some slick lens work and a cast on cracking form, Lee proves (perhaps above all to himself?) that playing it straight is not always a bad thing."

On May 2, 2007, the 50th San Francisco International Film Festival honored Spike Lee with the San Francisco Film Society's Directing Award. In 2008, he received the Wexner Prize. The same year, Lee directed the drama Miracle at St. Anna about an all-black U.S. division fighting in Italy during World War II. At the 2008 Cannes Film Festival, Lee, who was then making Miracle at St. Anna, criticized director Clint Eastwood for not depicting black Marines in his own World War II film, Flags of Our Fathers. Citing historical accuracy, Eastwood responded that his film was specifically about the Marines who raised the flag on Mount Suribachi at Iwo Jima, pointing out that while black Marines did fight at Iwo Jima, the U.S. military was racially segregated during World War II, and none of the men who raised the flag were black. He angrily said that Lee should "shut his face". Lee responded that Eastwood was acting like an "angry old man", and argued that despite making two Iwo Jima films back to back, Letters from Iwo Jima and Flags of Our Fathers, "there was not one black soldier in both of those films". He added that he and Eastwood were "not on a plantation". Lee later claimed that the event was exaggerated by the media and that he and Eastwood had reconciled through mutual friend Steven Spielberg, culminating in his sending Eastwood a print of Miracle at St. Anna.

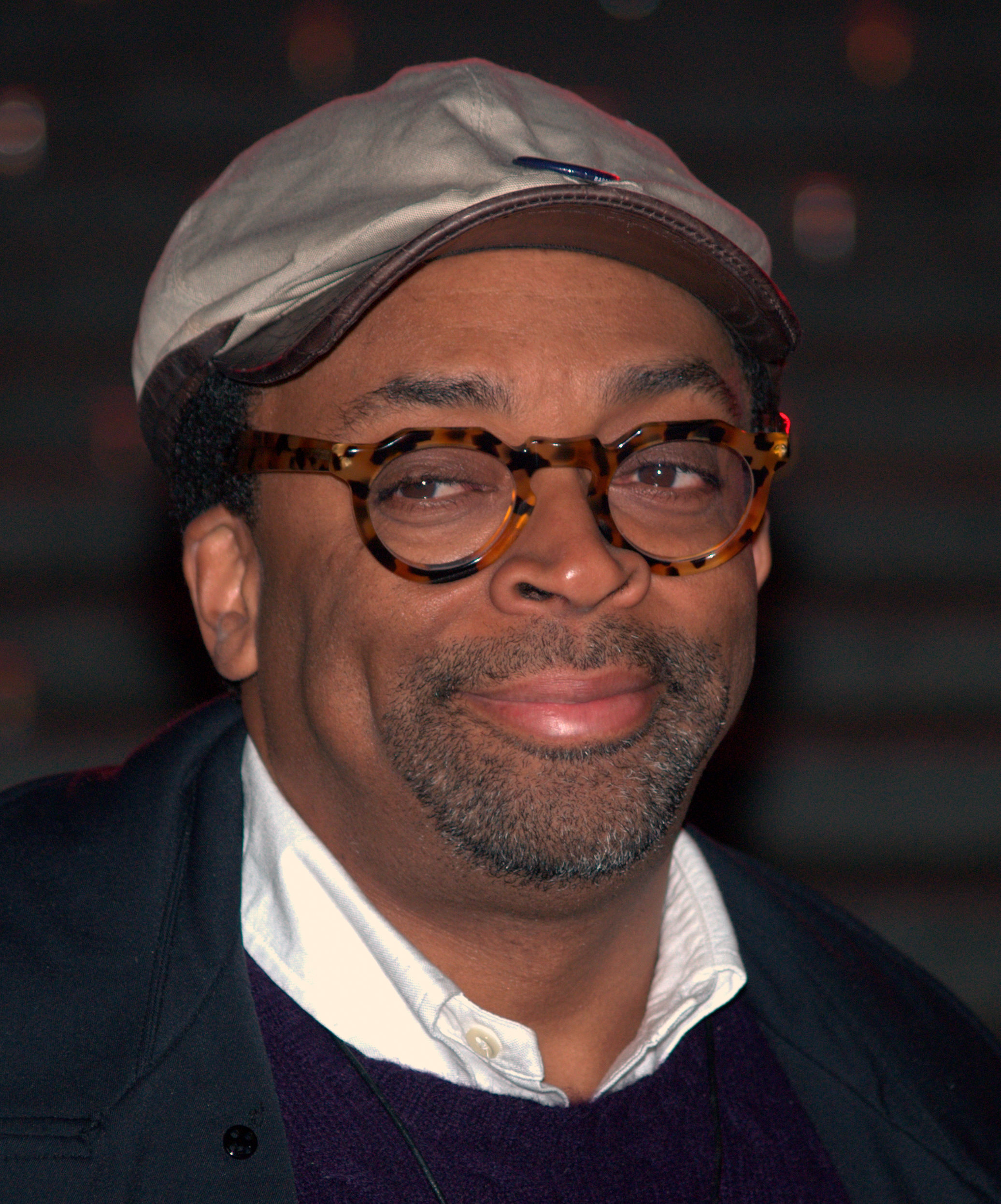
Lee at the 2009 Tribeca Film Festival

In 2012, Lee directed Red Hook Summer, in which he reprised his role as Mookie from Do the Right Thing. In 2013, Lee won The Dorothy and Lillian Gish Prize, one of the richest prizes in the American arts worth $300,000. The same year, he directed Oldboy, a remake of the Park Chan-wook 2003 film, which was reportedly taken away from Lee in the editing room, leading him to remove his trademark "A Spike Lee Joint" credit for a more impersonal "A Spike Lee Film". He followed this with Da Sweet Blood of Jesus (2014), which was primarily funded on Kickstarter.

=== 2015–present: Career resurgence ===
In 2015, Lee received an Academy Honorary Award from the Academy of Motion Picture Arts and Sciences for his contributions to film. Friends and frequent collaborators Wesley Snipes, Denzel Washington, and Samuel L. Jackson presented Lee with the award at the private Governors Awards ceremony. Lee directed, wrote, and produced the MyCareer story mode in the video game NBA 2K16. Later that same year, after a perceived long dip in quality, Lee rebounded with a musical drama film, Chi-Raq. The film is a modern-day adaptation of the ancient Greek play Lysistrata by Aristophanes set in modern-day Chicago's Southside and explores the challenges of race, sex, and violence in America. Teyonah Parris, Angela Bassett, Jennifer Hudson, Nick Cannon, Dave Chappelle, Wesley Snipes, John Cusack, and Samuel L. Jackson starred in the film. The film was released by Amazon Studios in select cities in November. Chi-Raq received generally positive reviews from critics. On Rotten Tomatoes, the film has rating of 82% with the site's critical consensus stating, "Chi-Raq is as urgently topical and satisfyingly ambitious as it is wildly uneven – and it contains some of Spike Lee's smartest, sharpest, and all-around entertaining late-period work."

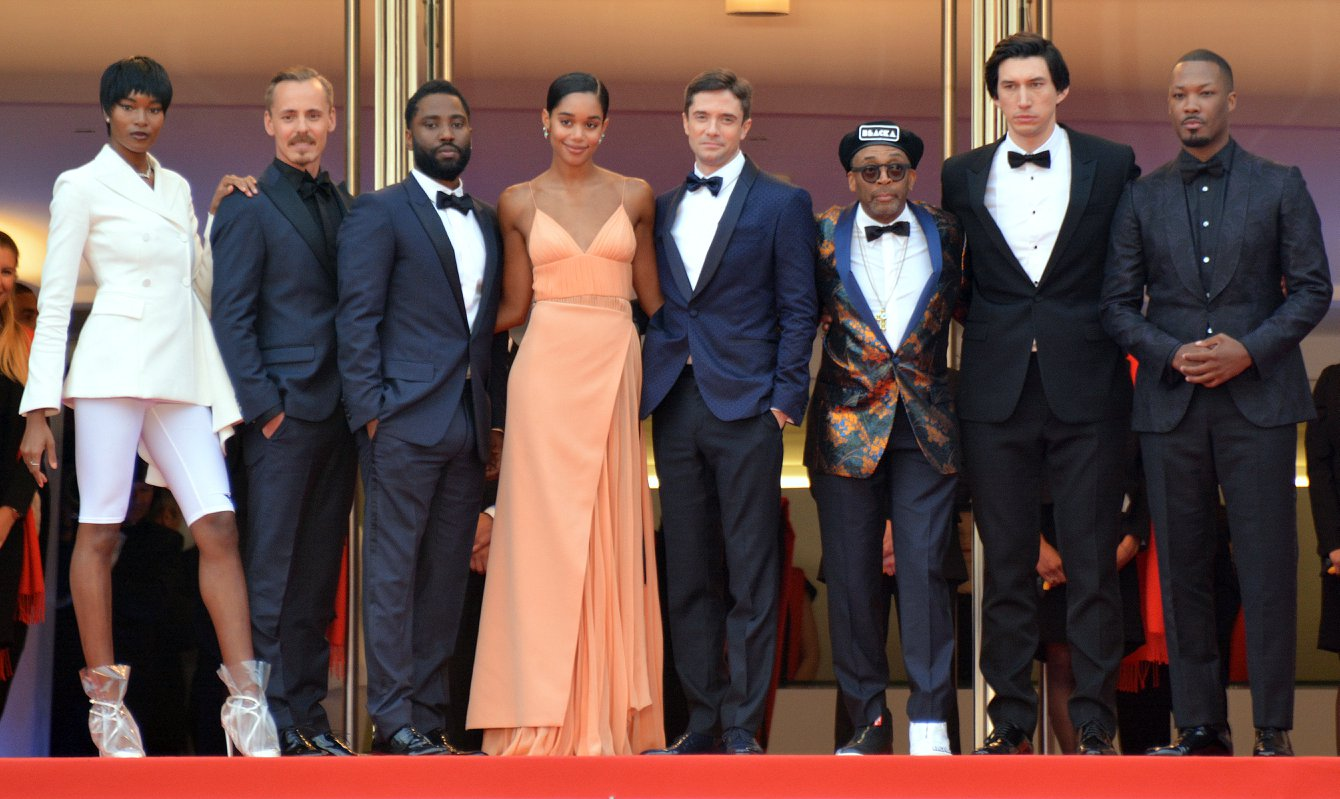
Lee with the cast of BlacKkKlansman (2018) promoting the film at the 2018 Cannes Film Festival

Lee's 2018 film BlacKkKlansman, a true crime drama set in the 1970s, centered around the true story of a black police officer, Ron Stallworth, infiltrating the Ku Klux Klan. The film premiered at the 2018 Cannes Film Festival, where it won the Grand Prix and opened the following August. The film received near universal praise when it opened in North America receiving a 96% on Rotten Tomatoes with the critics consensus reading, "BlacKkKlansman uses history to offer bitingly trenchant commentary on current events – and brings out some of Spike Lee's hardest-hitting work in decades along the way." In 2019, during the awards season leading up to the Academy Awards, Lee was invited to join a Directors Roundtable conversation run by The Hollywood Reporter. The roundtable included Ryan Coogler (Black Panther), Yorgos Lanthimos (The Favourite), Alfonso Cuarón (Roma), Marielle Heller (Can You Ever Forgive Me?), and Bradley Cooper (A Star is Born). It was nominated for the Academy Award for Best Picture and Best Director (Lee's first ever nomination in this category). Lee won his first competitive Academy Award in the category Best Adapted Screenplay. When asked by journalists from the BBC if the Best Picture winner Green Book offended him, Lee replied, "Let me give you a British answer, it's not my cup of tea". Many journalists in the industry noted how the 2019 Oscars with BlacKkKlansman competing against eventual winner Green Book mirrored the 1989 Oscars with Do the Right Thing missing out on a Best Picture nomination over the eventual winner Driving Miss Daisy.

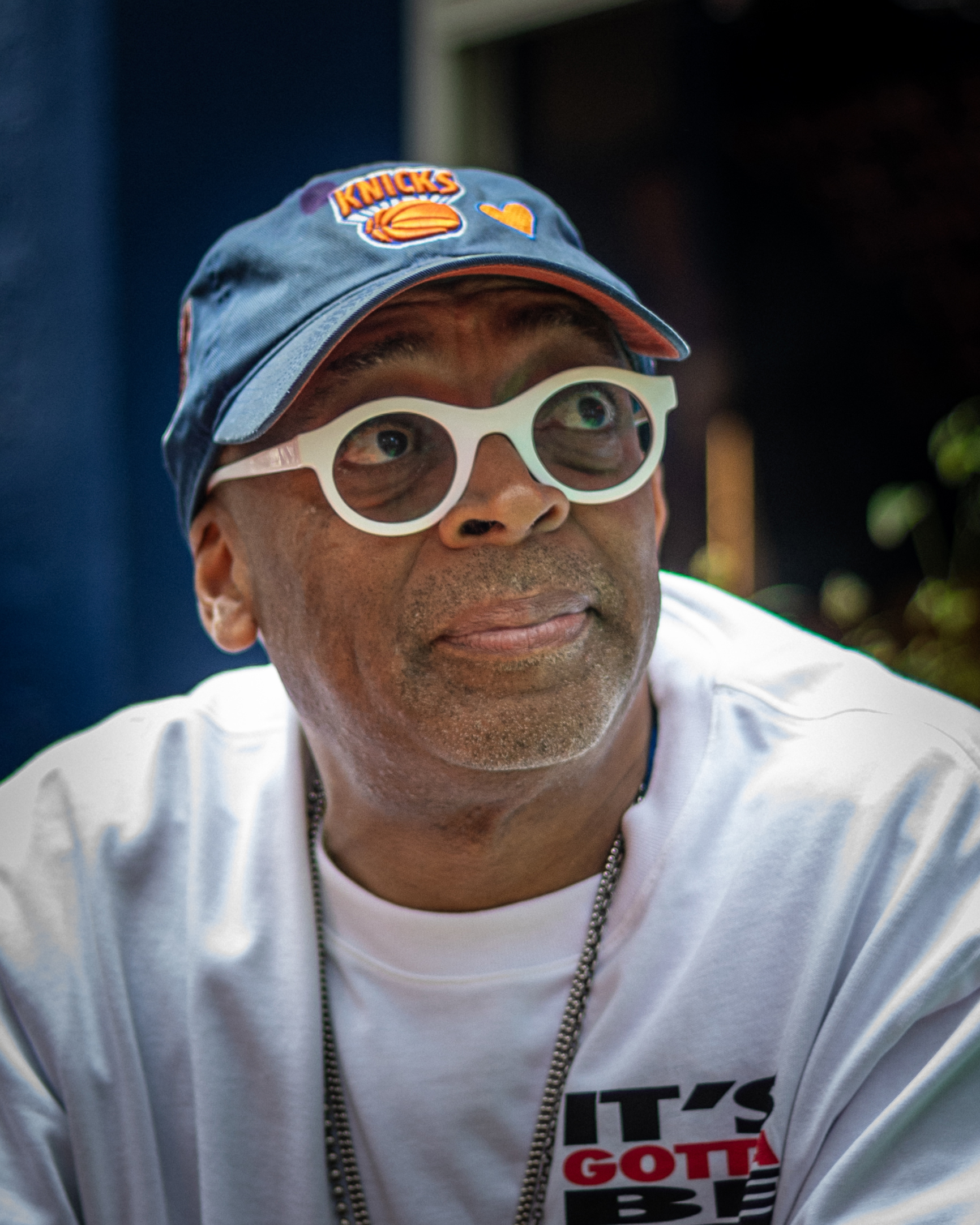
Lee in 2024

Lee's Vietnam war film Da 5 Bloods was released worldwide on Netflix on June 12, 2020. The film starred Delroy Lindo, Jonathan Majors, Clarke Peters, Isiah Whitlock Jr., Mélanie Thierry, Paul Walter Hauser and Chadwick Boseman. The film's plot follows a group of aging Vietnam War veterans who return to the country in search of the remains of their fallen squad leader, as well as the treasure they buried while serving there. Before the COVID-19 pandemic, the film had been scheduled to premiere out-of-competition at the 2020 Cannes Film Festival, then play in theaters in May or June before streaming on Netflix. The film received widespread critical acclaim; the website Rotten Tomatoes gave it an approval rating of 92% based on 252 reviews, with the critical consensus reading: "Fierce energy and ambition course through Da 5 Bloods, coming together to fuel one of Spike Lee's most urgent and impactful films." On Metacritic, the film has a weighted average score of 82 out of 100, based on 49 critics, indicating "universal acclaim".

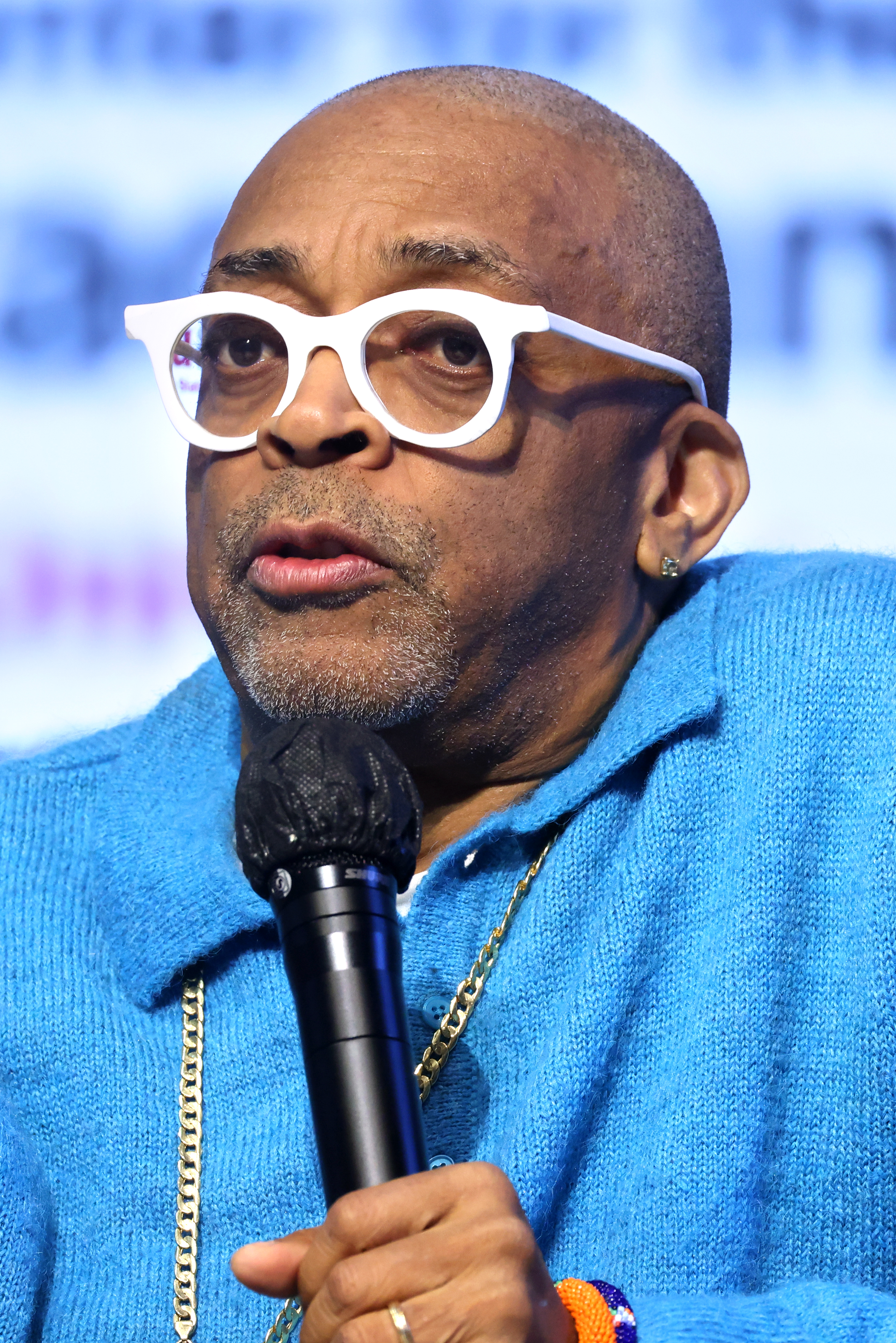
Lee in March 2025

In 2020, Lee was linked to a movie musical about the origin story of Viagra, Pfizer's erectile dysfunction drug. In December 2021, he signed a deal with Netflix to direct and produce more movies. In February 2024, it was announced that Lee was confirmed as the director of Highest 2 Lowest, a reinterpretation of High and Low (1963) originally directed by Akira Kurosawa, with Denzel Washington to star. In 2025, he directed an episode of the Netflix three-part documentary series Katrina: Come Hell and High Water, for which he also served as executive producer.

== Academic career and teaching ==
In 1991, Lee taught a course at Harvard about filmmaking. In 1993, he began to teach at New York University's Tisch School of the Arts in the Graduate Film Program. It was there that he received his master of fine arts. In 2002, he was appointed as artistic director of the school. He is now a tenured professor at NYU.

== Commercials ==
In mid-1990, Levi's hired Lee to direct a series of TV commercials for their 501 button-fly jeans. Marketing executives from Nike offered Lee a job directing commercials for the company. They wanted to pair Lee's character, Mars Blackmon, who greatly admired athlete Michael Jordan, and Jordan in a marketing campaign for the Air Jordan line. Later, Lee was asked to comment on the phenomenon of violence related to inner-city youths trying to steal Air Jordans from other kids. He said that, rather than blaming manufacturers of apparel that gained popularity, "deal with the conditions that make a kid put so much importance on a pair of sneakers, a jacket and gold". Through the marketing wing of 40 Acres and a Mule, Lee has directed commercials for Converse, Jaguar, Taco Bell, and Ben & Jerry's.

Since 2015, Lee has been part of Capital One's "Road Trip" advertising campaign, starring in a series of television commercials alongside Samuel L Jackson and Charles Barkley to coincide with March Madness.

== Artistic style, themes and reception ==
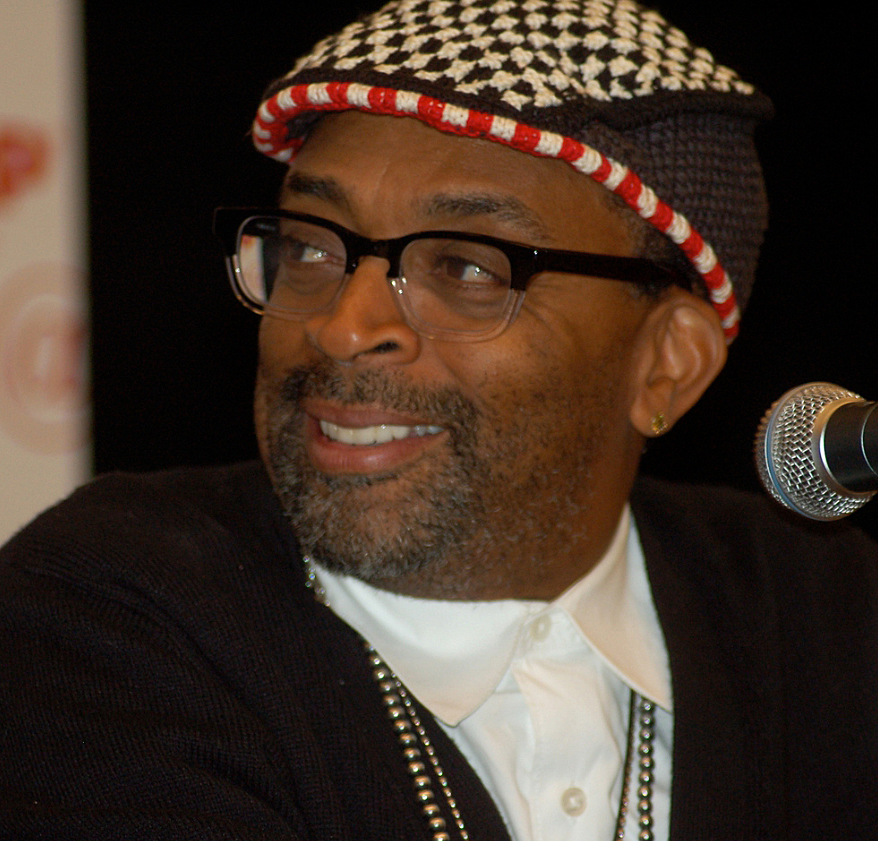
Lee in 2011

Lee's films are typically referred to as "Spike Lee Joints". The closing credits always end with the phrases "By Any Means Necessary", "Ya Dig", and "Sho Nuff". His 2013 film, Oldboy, used the traditional "A Spike Lee Film" credit after producers had it re-edited.

=== Themes ===
Lee's films have examined race relations, colorism in the black community, the role of media in contemporary life, urban crime and poverty, and other political issues. His films are also noted for their unique stylistic elements, including the use of dolly shots to portray the characters "floating" through their surroundings, which he has had his cinematographers repeatedly use in his work.

=== Influences ===
In 2018, during an interview with GQ, Lee cited some of his favorite films as Elia Kazan's On the Waterfront (1954) and A Face in the Crowd (1957), as well as Martin Scorsese's Mean Streets (1973). Lee says that he befriended Scorsese after attending a screening of After Hours at NYU.

=== Reception ===
In March 2012, after the killing of Trayvon Martin, Lee was one of many people who used Twitter to circulate a message that claimed to give the home address of the shooter George Zimmerman. The address turned out to be incorrect, causing the real occupants, Elaine and David McClain, to leave home and stay at a hotel due to numerous death threats. Lee issued an apology and reached an agreement with the McClains, which reportedly included "compensation", with their attorney stating "The McClains' claim is fully resolved". Nevertheless, in November 2013, the McClains filed a negligence lawsuit which accused Lee of "encouraging a dangerous mob mentality among his Twitter followers, as well as the public-at-large". The lawsuit, which a court filing reportedly valued at $1.2 million, alleged that the couple suffered "injuries and damages" that continued after the initial settlement up through Zimmerman's trial in 2013. A Seminole County judge dismissed the McClains' suit, agreeing with Lee that the issue had already been settled previously.

Lee has been criticized for his representation of women. For example, bell hooks said that he wrote black women in the same objectifying way that white male filmmakers write the characters of white women. Rosie Perez, who was in an acting role for the first time as Tina in Do the Right Thing, said later that she was very uncomfortable with doing the nude scene in the film, saying, "I had a big problem with it, mainly because I was afraid of what my family would think...It wasn't really about taking off my clothes. But I also didn't feel good about it because the atmosphere wasn't correct." Subsequently, Perez stated that Lee had offered an apology, and the two maintained their friendship.

Over the course of his career, Lee has defended Woody Allen, Michael Jackson and Nate Parker, all of whom have been accused of sexual misconduct.

== Personal life ==
=== Family, religion, and residence ===
Lee and his wife Tonya at the 2010 premiere of Wall Street: Money Never Sleeps in New York City

Lee met his wife, attorney Tonya Lewis Lee, in 1992, and they were married a year later in New York. They have two children.

When asked by the BBC whether he believed in God, Lee said: "Yes. I have faith that there is a higher being. All this cannot be an accident."

Lee continues to maintain an office in Fort Greene, Brooklyn, but he and his wife live on the Upper East Side of Manhattan. In the late 1990s, Lee bought the Barbara Rutherford Hatch House on the Upper East Side.

=== Sports ===
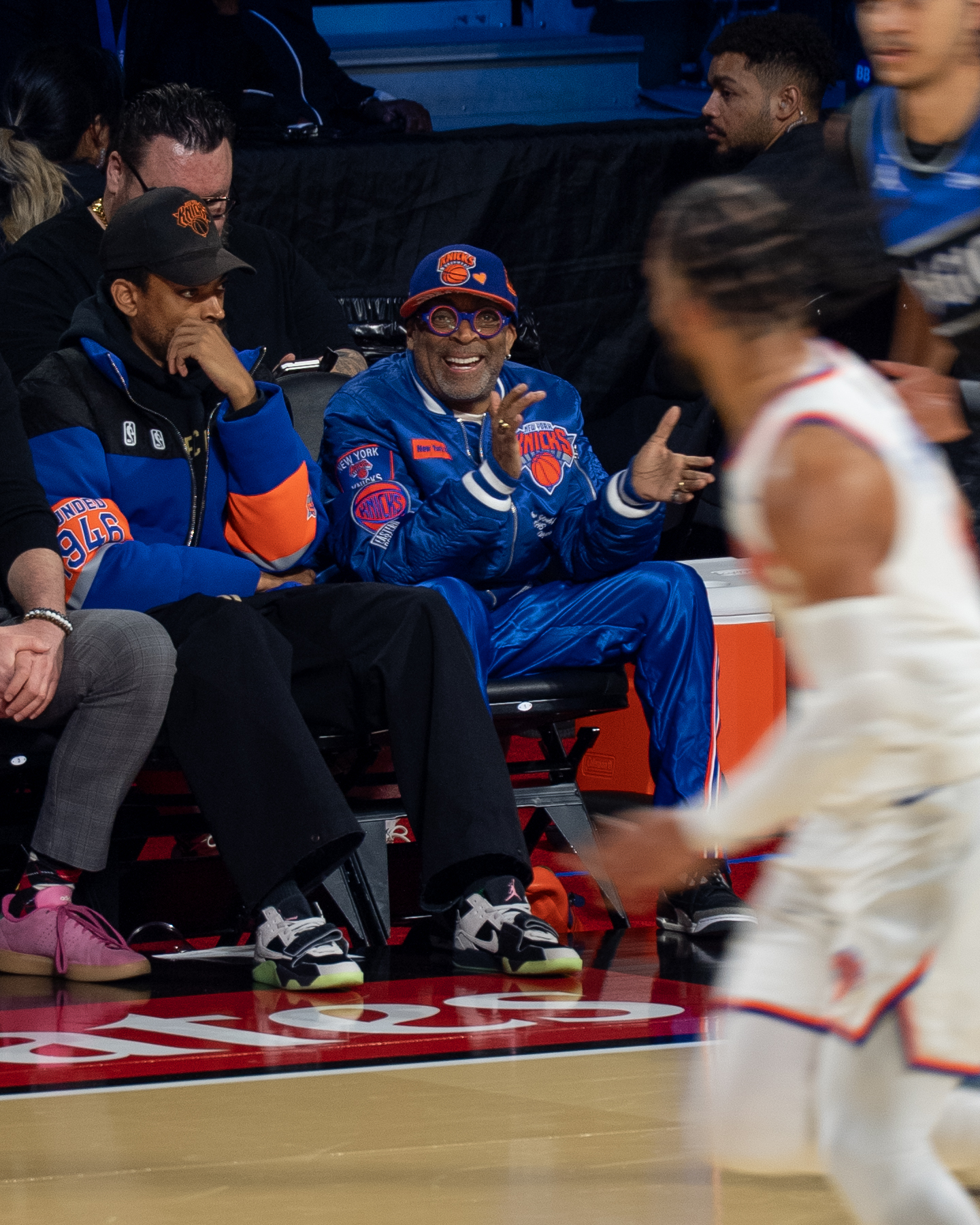
Lee watching the New York Knicks playing against the Orlando Magic in 2025

Lee is a fan of the New York Knicks basketball team, the New York Yankees baseball team (although he grew up a New York Mets fan), the New York Rangers ice hockey team, and the English football club Arsenal. One of the documentaries in ESPN's 30 for 30 series, Winning Time: Reggie Miller vs. The New York Knicks, focuses partly on Lee's interaction with Miller at Knicks games in Madison Square Garden. In June 2003, Lee sought an injunction against Spike TV to prevent them from using his nickname; he claimed that because of his fame, viewers would think he was associated with the channel. In March 2020, Lee and the security team at Madison Square Garden had a disagreement over which entrance to use to see the New York Knicks; Lee stated he would not attend the rest of the games for the season. Spike Lee has also frequented New York Liberty games at Barclays Center, sitting courtside during the 2024 WNBA playoffs in a Sabrina Ionescu jersey.

Lee is also a supporter of Spanish tennis player Carlos Alcaraz and Italian soccer team Inter Milan, featuring as the narrator in a promotional video for the club in June 2025.

=== Politics ===
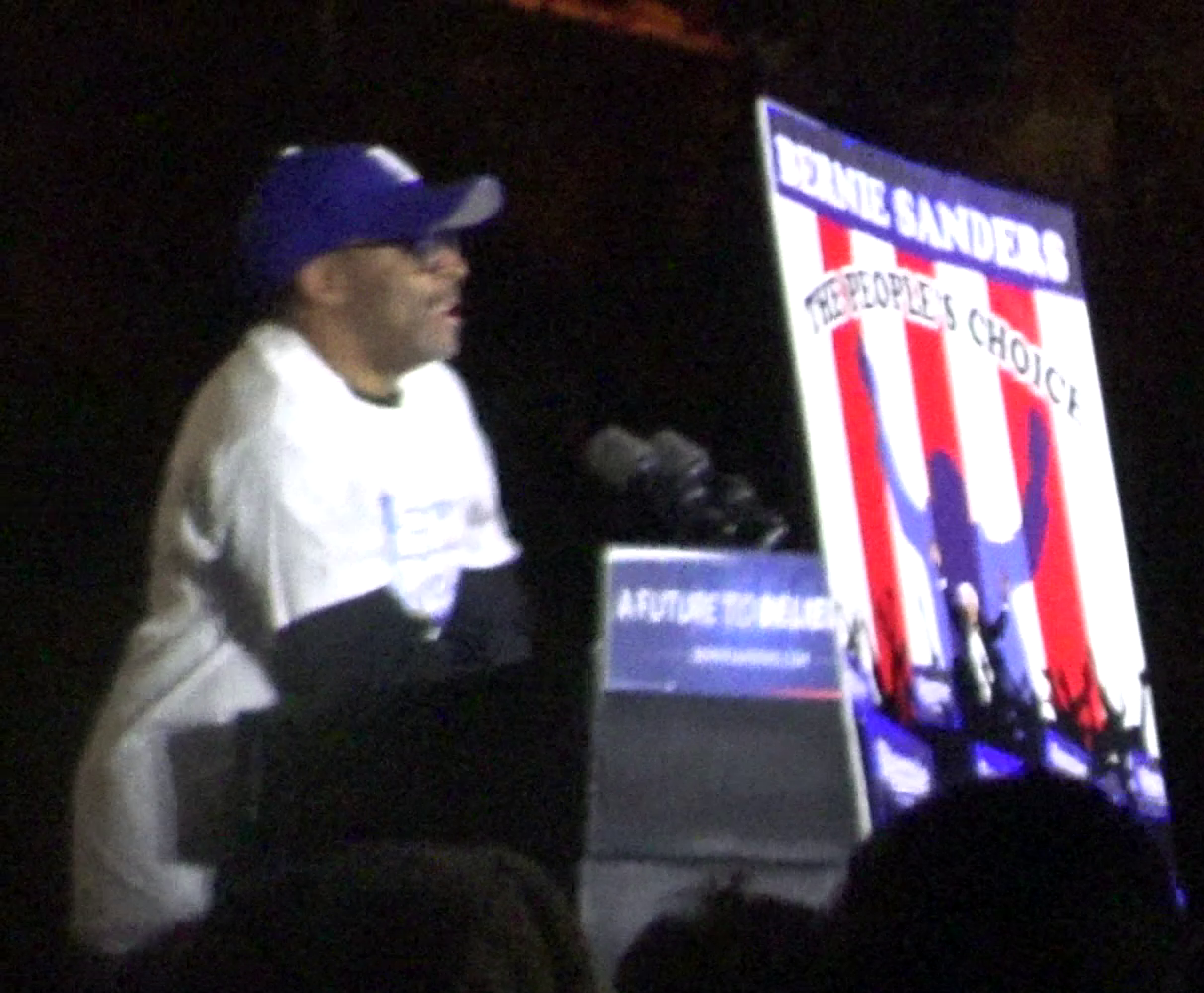
Lee speaking at a rally in support of the 2016 presidential campaign of Bernie Sanders in Washington Square Park, April 2016

In May 1999, the New York Post reported that Lee made an inflammatory comment about Charlton Heston, president of the National Rifle Association of America (NRA), while speaking to reporters at the Cannes Film Festival. Lee was quoted as saying the NRA should be disbanded and, of Heston, someone should "Shoot him with a .44 Bull Dog." Lee said he intended it as a joke. He was responding to coverage about whether Hollywood was responsible for school shootings. "The problem is guns", he said. Republican House Majority Leader Dick Armey condemned Lee as having "nothing to offer the debate on school violence except more violence and more hate".

In October 2005, Lee responded to a CNN anchor's question as to whether the government intentionally ignored the plight of black Americans during the 2005 Hurricane Katrina catastrophe by saying, "It's not too far-fetched. I don't put anything past the United States government. I don't find it too far-fetched that they tried to displace all the black people out of New Orleans." In later comments, Lee cited the government's past, including the Tuskegee Syphilis Study.

In October 2015, Spike Lee visited the National Basketball Association's Manhattan headquarters to discuss producing a commercial that would denounce gun violence in America. In December 2015, Everytown for Gun Safety Support Fund joined with the NBA and Lee to launch the 'End Gun Violence,' campaign focusing on the 88 Americans who are killed with guns every day.

In May 2020, Lee published a three-minute short film, NEW YORK NEW YORK, on Instagram that was later featured on the city's official website. Lee celebrated Joe Biden's victory over Donald Trump in the 2020 presidential election with champagne amid a crowd on the streets of Brooklyn. Lee endorsed Kamala Harris in the 2024 United States presidential election and spoke at one of her campaign rallies on October 24, 2024.

Lee has been critical of Trump, whom he often refers to as "Agent Orange". When asked about the president's tariffs on the film industry, Lee replied: "People are hurting [and] no one's working. There's this guy (Trump) who wants to put a tariff on every film that shoots [outside the U.S.]. I don't know how that's going to work. I love to shoot [in New York]… it's the vibe, it's an energy. I'm very lucky that I've been able to shoot films that take place in New York."

While promoting his film Highest 2 Lowest in the fall of 2025, during an interview with MSNBC's Politics Nation host Rev. Al Sharpton, Lee said President Trump should "think twice" if he was considering a Federal takeover of New York.

During the October 2025 No Kings protests, Lee posted on his Instagram encouraging his followers to, "get up, stand up."

In October 2026, while dining at Yankee Stadium before a game, Lee was recorded needing to be held back during an exchange where an individual approached him and allegedly used an expletive regarding the Israel-Palestine conflict.

=== Philanthropy ===
In 2019, Lee partnered with the Jackie Robinson Foundation and Budweiser to mark the 100th anniversary of Robinson's birth in 1919. Lee directed a 3-minute short film narrated by Robinson's daughter, Sharon Robinson.

Lee has also worked with Soles4Souls, Champions for Children, the Creative Coalition, and the AARP.

== Filmography ==
Directed features
Year	Title	Distributor
1986	She's Gotta Have It	Island Pictures
1988	School Daze	Columbia Pictures
1989	Do the Right Thing	Universal Pictures
1990	Mo' Better Blues	Universal Pictures
1991	Jungle Fever	Universal Pictures
1992	Malcolm X	Warner Bros.
1994	Crooklyn	Universal Pictures
1995	Clockers	Universal Pictures
1996	Girl 6	20th Century Fox
1996	Get on the Bus	Columbia Pictures
1998	He Got Game	Touchstone Pictures
1999	Summer of Sam	Touchstone Pictures
2000	Bamboozled	New Line Cinema
2002	25th Hour	Touchstone Pictures
2004	She Hate Me	Sony Pictures Classics
2006	Inside Man	Universal Pictures
2008	Miracle at St. Anna	Touchstone Pictures
2012	Red Hook Summer	Variance Films
2013	Oldboy	FilmDistrict
2014	Da Sweet Blood of Jesus	Gravitas Ventures
2015	Chi-Raq	Roadside Attractions
2018	BlacKkKlansman	Focus Features
2020	Da 5 Bloods	Netflix
2025	Highest 2 Lowest	A24 / Apple TV

== Awards and honors ==
In 1983, Lee won the Student Academy Award for his film Joe's Bed-Stuy Barbershop: We Cut Heads. He won several awards at the Black Reel Awards: Outstanding Director, TV Movie for Mike Tyson: Undisputed Truth, Outstanding Television Documentary for If God is Willing and Da Creek Don't Rise, and Outstanding Film Director for Inside Man (2006). He also won at the Black Movie Awards for Inside Man, and the Berlin International Film Festival for Get on the Bus. He won a BAFTA Award for Best Adapted Screenplay for BlacKkKlansman (2018), which also received nominations for Director and Best Film.

In 2007, he won two Emmy Awards, Outstanding Directing For Nonfiction Programming and Exceptional Merit In Nonfiction Filmmaking for When The Levees Broke: A Requiem In Four Acts. He was previously nominated in 1988 for Outstanding Non-Fiction Special for 4 Little Girls, and later nominated in 2021 for Outstanding Variety Special (Pre-Recorded) and Outstanding Directing For A Variety Special for David Byrne's American Utopia.

Lee was nominated for Academy Awards for Best Original Screenplay for Do the Right Thing and Best Documentary for 4 Little Girls, but did not win either award. In 2015, at the age of 58, Lee became the youngest person ever to receive an Academy Honorary Award. Lee received the award as "a champion of independent film and an inspiration to young filmmakers". Frequent collaborators Denzel Washington, Samuel L. Jackson, and Wesley Snipes presented Lee with the award at a private ceremony at the Governors Awards. In 2019, Lee's film BlacKkKlansman went on to receive six Academy Award nominations. Lee himself was nominated for three: Best Picture, Best Director, and Best Adapted Screenplay. He went on to win the Best Adapted Screenplay, his first competitive Academy Award.

Two of his films have competed for the Palme d'Or award at the Cannes Film Festival, and of the two, BlacKkKlansman won the Grand Prix in 2018. Lee's films Do the Right Thing, Malcolm X, 4 Little Girls, She's Gotta Have It, and Bamboozled were each selected by the Library of Congress for preservation in the National Film Registry for being "culturally, historically, or aesthetically significant". On May 18, 2016, Lee delivered the Commencement address for The Johns Hopkins University Class of 2016.

In 2020, Lee received the Chaplin Award at a New York City gala presented by Film at Lincoln Center. In 2021, he was recognized by American Cinema Editors (ACE), receiving its ACE Golden Eddie Filmmaker of the Year Award. In 2022, Lee was honored with a Lifetime Achievement Award by the Directors Guild of America (DGA). He was named as the recipient of the Ebert Director Award at the TIFF Tribute Awards for the 2023 Toronto International Film Festival. In March 2024, Lee received a Board of Governor's Award from the American Society of Cinematographers (ASC). In October 2025, he accepted a Lifetime Achievement Award from the Chicago International Film Festival. That same year, Lee received a Career Achievement Award at the Critics Choice Association's 8th Annual Celebration of Black Cinema & Television.

Four of Lee's films (Bamboozled, David Byrne's American Utopia, Do the Right Thing, and Malcolm X) had been included in The Criterion Collection. Do the Right Thing was also included in CC40, a 40-film box set celebrating Criterion's 40th anniversary.

Awards and nominations received by Lee's films
Year	Film	Academy Awards		BAFTA Awards		Golden Globe Awards	
Year	Film	Nominations	Wins	Nominations	Wins	Nominations	Wins
1989	Do the Right Thing	2				4	
1992	Malcolm X	2				1	
2002	25th Hour					1	
2018	BlacKkKlansman	6	1	5	1	4	
2020	Da 5 Bloods	1		1			
Total		11	1	6	1	10	0

Directed Academy Award performances
Under Lee's direction, these actors have received Academy Award nominations for their performances in their respective roles.

Year	Performer	Film	Result
Academy Award for Best Actor
1992	Denzel Washington	Malcolm X	Nominated
Academy Award for Best Supporting Actor
1989	Danny Aiello	Do the Right Thing	Nominated
2018	Adam Driver	BlacKkKlansman	Nominated
