= School Daze =

1988 film by Spike Lee

- Theatrical release poster
- Directed by: Spike Lee
- Written by: Spike Lee
- Produced by: Spike Lee
- Starring: Laurence Fishburne; Giancarlo Esposito; Tisha Campbell; Kyme; Joe Seneca; Art Evans; Ellen Holly; Ossie Davis
- Cinematography: Ernest Dickerson
- Edited by: Barry Alexander Brown
- Music by: Bill Lee
- Production company: 40 Acres and a Mule Filmworks
- Distributed by: Columbia Pictures
- Release date: February 12, 1988
- Running time: 121 minutes
- Country: United States
- Language: English
- Budget: $6.1 million
- Box office: $14.5 million

School Daze is a 1988 American musical comedy-drama film written and directed by Spike Lee and starring Lee along with Laurence Fishburne (credited as Larry Fishburne), Giancarlo Esposito, and Tisha Campbell. Released on February 12, 1988, by Columbia Pictures as Lee's second feature film, and based partly on his experiences as a student at Morehouse College in the Atlanta University Center, it is a story about undergraduates in a fraternity and sorority clashing with some of their classmates at a historically black college during homecoming week. It also touches upon issues of colorism, elitism, classism, political activism, hazing, groupthink, female self-esteem, social mobility, and hair texture bias within the African-American community.

== Plot ==
On Friday of homecoming weekend at Mission College, a prestigious historically black college in Atlanta, Georgia, Vaughn "Dap" Dunlap, a politically militant and socially conscious black senior, leads an anti-apartheid demonstration, demanding that the school divest from South Africa. However, the fraternity Gamma Phi Gamma and their pledge class, the Gammites, arrive to interrupt the demonstration. Julian "Dean Big Brother Almighty" Eaves, the head/president of Mission College's Gamma Phi Gamma Fraternity chapter and Dap's former friend, upsets Dap by stating his opposition to the protest, after which Student Government Association president Virgil Cloyd breaks up both their subsequent fight and the rally. Dap's younger cousin Darrell, a Gamma pledge known as "Half-Pint" to Julian and his fellow Big Brothers (Chucky, Dr. Feelgood, Lance, X-Ray Vision, and General George Patton; the assistant dean of the pledge class), is ordered to bring a girl to the fraternity that night, and goes to Dap for advice.

Cedar Cloud, chairman of Mission's board of trustees, warns college president Harold McPherson that Dap's divestment protests may scare off the school's wealthy donors. In the evening, Dap asks his friends Da Fellas (Grady, Monroe, Jordan, Edge, and Booker T.) to return with him to the administration building to protest. Although supportive of Dap's cause, they decline, wanting to complete their college education and get good jobs in the future. Meanwhile, the Gamma Rays ("wannabes", who are mostly light-skinned black women with straightened hair), the Gamma women's auxiliary led by Julian's girlfriend Jane Toussaint, clash with some of their non-Greek classmates ("jigaboos", who are mostly dark-skinned black women with natural hair), including Dap's girlfriend Rachel Meadows, over skin color and hair politics. Unsuccessful in courting any female students, Half-Pint and his fellow Gammites (Doo-Doo Breath, Double Rubber, Mussolini, Mustafa, Yoda, Slim Daddy, and Sir Nose) are hazed by the Big Brothers. Dap and Rachel have a falling out when she plans to rush a sorority, and she accuses him of colorism.

On Saturday, the weekend's festivities begin, and the Gamma brothers nearly come to blows with Dap and his fellow protestors at the homecoming parade. After the Mission football team suffers an embarrassing loss at the homecoming football game, Dap is called into McPherson's office and informed by Cloud that if he continues with his protests he will be expelled. Da Fellas drive into town to eat at a local KFC, where they are harassed by locals who resent them as privileged college boys. Returning to campus, Dap confronts Julian about Half-Pint's pledge status. On Sunday, at the Greeks' step show, a performance by Da Fellas (as "the brothers of Fellas Phi Fellas") leads to a brawl with the Gammas. Seeking out Rachel, Dap is humiliated by her dorm neighbors, but he and Rachel reconcile.

That evening, following a grueling initiation, the Gammites are welcomed as new members. At the school dance, Dap's roommate Grady hits it off with a female student and coaxes her to his room, but she refuses to stay when Dap and Rachel are already there. As the Gammas celebrate, Julian becomes annoyed with Jane. Singling out Half-Pint, Julian orders him to sleep with Jane as a final test. Although Half-Pint and Jane are both uncomfortable with Julian's request, she insists she would do anything for Julian. Afterward, Julian accuses Jane of prioritizing the fraternity and his position as leader over him, and breaks up with her. Half-Pint excitedly informs Dap that he slept with Jane by Julian's orders; infuriated that his cousin has become an entitled Gamma, the two disown each other. At sunrise, Dap runs to the center of the campus quad and awakens the entire campus from the previous night's debauchery by ringing a large bell. A tearful Julian, remorseful for his treatment of Half-Pint and Jane, arrives and stands eye-to-eye with Dap, who breaks the fourth wall to tell the audience directly: "Please, wake up".

== Cast ==
- Laurence Fishburne (credited as Larry Fishburne) as Vaughn "Dap" Dunlap
- Giancarlo Esposito as Julian "Dean Big Brother Almighty" Eaves
- Tisha Campbell as Jane Toussaint
- Kyme as Rachel Meadows
- Joe Seneca as President Harold McPherson
- Ellen Holly as Odrie McPherson
- Art Evans as Cedar Cloud
- Ossie Davis as Coach Odom
- Bill Nunn as Grady
- Branford Marsalis as Jordan
- Kadeem Hardison as Edge
- Spike Lee as Darrell "Half-Pint" Dunlap
- Darryl M. Bell as Big Brother X-Ray Vision
- Joie Lee as Lizzie Life
- Alva Rogers as Doris Witherspoon
- Jasmine Guy as Dina
- Samuel L. Jackson as Leeds
- Roger Guenveur Smith as Yoda
- Cinqué Lee as Buckwheat
- Cylk Cozart as Big Brother Dr. Feelgood
- Dominic Hoffman as Mustafa
- Kirk Taylor as Sir Nose
- Erik Dellums as Slim Daddy
- Rusty Cundieff as Big Brother Chucky
- Leonard L. Thomas as Big Brother General George Patton
- Tyra Ferrell as Tasha
- Gregg Burge as Virgil Cloyd
- A.J. Johnson as Cecilia
- Cassi Davis as Paula
- Kasi Lemmons as Perry
- Phyllis Hyman as Phyllis

== Themes ==
School Daze explores several issues within the Black-American community such as colorism, elitism, classism, political activism, hazing, groupthink, female self-esteem, social mobility, and hair texture bias—all against the backdrop of a historically black college. Daphnee McMaster of The Spool asserts that in setting the film at an HBCU director Spike Lee peers into a very particular black space largely isolated from the rest of American society: "every conversation is directly related to black people's own perceptions of, and issues amongst, themselves".

=== Class divisions ===
Two major themes found in the film are the issues of skin color-based class divisions and economic inequality. The divide between light-skinned people and dark-skinned people is exemplified by the rivalry between the Gamma Phi Gamma fraternity and its coed counterpart—which are predominantly made up of affluent, light-skinned students and Dap's politically conscious friends and the Pi Delta Pi sorority—which is predominantly made up of dark-skinned students from lower-class backgrounds. Throughout the film, the characters from both groups engage in a series of confrontations and conflicts, fueled by their respective feelings of superiority and resentment towards one another. Another theme tied to this is the exploration of economic inequality through the character of Dap, a socially conscious and politically active student who is involved in a campaign to increase the number of black faculty members at Mission College. Dap's activism and commitment to social justice are juxtaposed with the apathy and materialism of other students, such as Julian, the wealthy and privileged president and dean of membership intake of the Gamma Phi Gamma fraternity.

== Production ==
Following the release of his debut feature film, She's Gotta Have It, in August 1986, Spike Lee started writing the screenplay for School Daze. Lee initially secured a $3 million budget, but concerns from Island Pictures about potential cost increases, possibly reaching $5 million, led them to drop their option. Columbia Pictures subsequently acquired the film. Filming commenced on March 9, 1987, in Atlanta, Georgia. Reverend Jesse Jackson visited the set to offer a blessing. Initially set on the campus of Morehouse College, production faced obstacles when the Atlanta University Center objected to the film's portrayal of historically black colleges. Consequently, filming was prohibited at Morehouse College, as well as Clark Atlanta University, Morris Brown College, and Spelman College. The production relocated to Atlanta University, with additional filming in Brooklyn, New York.

Lee arranged for the two groups of actors to stay in separate hotels during filming. The actors playing the "wannabes" were given better accommodations than the ones playing the "jigaboos". This favoritism contributed to tension on the set, which showed in the on-camera animosity between the two camps. (Similar tactics were used during the filming of Animal House and The Outsiders). In School Daze, the method approach yielded strong results — the fight that occurs at the step show between Dap's crew and the Gammas was not in the script. On the day the scene was shot, the fight broke out between the two sides. Lee ordered the cameras to keep rolling. Ruth E. Carter designed the costumes for the film, inspired by uniforms and styles worn at the HBCUs. At Lee's encouragement, she commissioned American fashion designer Willi Smith to design the gowns for the Homecoming Court in the film. Filming concluded on May 4, 1987, with a final budget of $6.1 million.

Actress Vanessa Williams, originally cast as "Jane Toussaint", was replaced by Tisha Campbell. In June 1988, Campbell filed a $550,000 lawsuit against Lee, alleging non-payment for her contribution to the soundtrack and lack of credit for the song "Be Alone Tonight".

== Reception and legacy ==
The film received mixed reviews for its exploration of issues within the black community. Roger Ebert of the Chicago Sun-Times noted: "There is no doubt in my mind that School Daze, in its own way, is one of the most honest and revealing movies I've ever seen about modern middle-class black life in America". He also noted its frank exploration of issues of discrimination within the black community related to skin tone and nature of hair. He said it was significant as a film with a "completely black orientation. All of the characters, good and bad, are black, and all of the character's references are to each other."

On review aggregator website Rotten Tomatoes, the film holds an approval rating of 58%, based on 31 reviews, and an average rating of 5.8/10. The critical consensus reads: "School Daze is undeniably messy, but thought-provoking themes, strong performances, and Spike Lee's ingratiating energy help tie it all together".

Kadeem Hardison, Darryl M. Bell and Jasmine Guy were principal cast members on The Cosby Show spin-off, A Different World — a TV series about life at a historically black college. (The NBC sitcom was airing its first season at the time of the film's release.) Other School Daze cast members also appeared on A Different World, including Dominic Hoffman, Tisha Campbell, Art Evans, Guy Killum, and Roger Guenveur Smith.

In 2008, Alicia Keys paid homage to School Daze in the music video for her song "Teenage Love Affair". She imitated scenes including the rally in front of the school building, the pajama party, and the scene where Tisha Campbell and her court perform at coronation.

== Soundtrack ==
"Da Butt", written by Marcus Miller and Mark Stevens, and performed by the group E.U. (who appear in the film), hit number 1 on Billboard's R&B chart and number 35 on its Pop chart. The School Daze soundtrack also features the song, "Be One", written by Bill Lee and performed by Phyllis Hyman, who also appears in the film.

== See also ==
- Brown Paper Bag Test
- Burning Sands (2017)
- List of African-American fraternities
