= Louisiana Recovery Authority =

Governmental agency

The Louisiana Recovery Authority (LRA) was the governmental body created in the aftermath of hurricanes Katrina and Rita by Governor Kathleen Blanco to plan for the recovery and rebuilding of Louisiana. Under the leadership of the founding executive director, Andy Kopplin, the authority's mission was to plan for Louisiana's future, coordinate across jurisdictions, support community recovery and resurgence, and ensure integrity and effectiveness. By working in collaboration with local, state and federal agencies, the authority's goal was to also address short-term recovery needs while guiding the long-term planning process.

In part, the authority's creation was intended to ensure recovery decisions were made based on critical recovery priorities rather than political influences. It was modeled on the Lower Manhattan Development Corporation, which guided recovery and redevelopment in New York after 9/11.

Hurricanes Katrina and Rita devastated South Louisiana, destroying more than 200,000 homes and 18,000 businesses and causing about $25 billion in insured losses. The LRA lead one of the most extensive rebuilding efforts in the world. The LRA's decisions were made by a 33-member board of directors, led by its chairman, Xavier University of Louisiana President Norman Francis, and its vice chairman, journalist and author Walter Isaacson. The authority was staffed by fewer than 30 state government employees.

The LRA designed all policy and programs funded by $10.4 billion in federal Community Development Block Grant (CDBG) congressionally approved funds. The LRA's largest program dedicated $7.5 billion to helping residents of Louisiana affected by Hurricane Katrina or Rita get back into their homes as quickly and fairly as possible. At the time, the groundbreaking program, called the Road Home, represented the largest single housing recovery program in U.S. history.

The program afforded eligible homeowners up to $150,000 in compensation for their losses to get back into their homes. As of February 1, 2008 the final number of applications received was 185,106. Of those applications received 159,406 were deemed eligible.

== See also ==
- Road Home
