= John Friedrich (actor) =

American film actor (born 1958)

- Born: March 15, 1958 (age 68); Los Angeles, California
- Occupation: Actor
- Years active: 1976–1984

John Friedrich (born March 15, 1958) is an American former actor.

== Career ==
A character actor of the 1970s and early 1980s, John Friedrich is probably best known for his portrayal of Joey Capra in The Wanderers (1979), Philip Kaufman's film adaption of Richard Price's novel.

A familiar face on television throughout the '70s, Friedrich made guest starring appearances on the police drama series, Baretta, and The Streets of San Francisco. He also had a strong supporting role in the John Travolta telefilm, The Boy in the Plastic Bubble. In 1984 Friedrich played the lead role of Marshall Weatherly in The Paper Chase episode "Not Prince Hamlet".

In 1978, he appeared in two films; the much-criticized disco film, Thank God It's Friday, and the school comedy Almost Summer. A year later he was cast as Joey in The Wanderers. In 1982, he worked alongside James Woods in the prison drama, Fast-Walking, in which he portrayed a gay convict called "Squeeze."

Another of Friedrich's most recognizable roles was as Frank Cleary, the oldest of the Cleary brothers, in the 1983 mini-series, The Thorn Birds; based on the novel by Colleen McCullough. In both The Thorn Birds, and Friedrich's final film release, The Final Terror, he worked with the British actress Rachel Ward.

After working in The Thorn Birds, Friedrich ended his film career.

The Final Terror was filmed in 1981 but released in 1983 (after Friedrich's retirement), due to the popularity of its female leads, Rachel Ward and Daryl Hannah.

At the peak of his career with The Thorn Birds, Friedrich retired to New Mexico, married, started a family, and began a career as a financial consultant. He also became something of a cult icon as his films developed a cult following. Rumors persisted about him, including one recurring myth that he was working as a live-in gardener for his Wanderers co-star, Ken Wahl, who had gone on to success in the television series Wiseguy.

There has also been confusion between the film actor and an Australian criminal and former government official of the same name who committed suicide in 1991. At least one website has claimed that the actor and the criminal, John Friedrich, are one and the same.

In 2007, Friedrich resurfaced when he appeared on stage at the University of Hawaiʻi to discuss his films with professor Marc Moody. During this stage appearance, Friedrich shared anecdotes of his decade-long career and commented that he would like to return to acting, to "complete that chapter" in his life.

== Filmography ==
Film
| Year | Title | Role | Director |
|---|---|---|---|
| 1976 | Bittersweet Love | Josh | David Miller |
| 1978 | Thank God It's Friday | Ken | Robert Klane |
| 1978 | Almost Summer | Darryl Fitzgerald | Martin Davidson |
| 1979 | The Wanderers | Joey Capra | Philip Kaufman |
| 1980 | A Small Circle of Friends | Alex Haddox | Rob Cohen |
| 1982 | Fast-Walking | "Squeeze" | James B. Harris |
| 1983 | The Final Terror | Dennis Zorich | Andrew Davis |

Television
| Year | Title | Role | Notes |
|---|---|---|---|
| 1975 | Baretta | Niki Coppelli | "The Coppelli Oath" (S1E7) |
| 1976 | Baretta | "Cornflakes" | "Under the City" (S3E7) |
| 1976 | The Boy in the Plastic Bubble | Roy Slater | TV movie |
| 1977 | The Death of Richie | Kurt | TV movie |
| 1977 | Baretta | Donnie Locker | "Guns and Brothers" (S3E23) |
| 1977 | The Streets of San Francisco | Hal Fin | "Breakup" (S5E21) |
| 1977 | In the Matter of Karen Ann Quinlan | John Quinlan | TV movie |
| 1978 | Forever | Artie Lewin | TV movie |
| 1978 | Family | Robert Pearson | "See Saw" (S3E15) |
| 1979 | Studs Lonigan | Martin Lonigan | Miniseries (3 episodes) |
| 1980 | A Rumor of War | Corporal Pascarella | Miniseries (2 episodes) |
| 1983 | The Thorn Birds | Frank Cleary | Miniseries (3 episodes) |
| 1984 | The Paper Chase | Marshall Weatherly | "Not Prince Hamlet" (S2E18) |
