= Freedomland (film) =

2006 US crime drama mystery film by Joe Roth

- Theatrical release poster
- Directed by: Joe Roth
- Screenplay by: Richard Price
- Based on: Freedomland by Richard Price
- Produced by: Scott Rudin; Charles Newirth
- Starring: Samuel L. Jackson; Julianne Moore; Edie Falco; Ron Eldard; William Forsythe; Aunjanue Ellis; Anthony Mackie
- Cinematography: Anastas Michos
- Edited by: Nick Moore
- Music by: James Newton Howard
- Production companies: Columbia Pictures; Revolution Studios
- Distributed by: Sony Pictures Releasing
- Release date: February 17, 2006
- Running time: 113 minutes
- Country: United States
- Language: English
- Budget: $30 million
- Box office: $14.7 million

Freedomland is a 2006 American crime drama mystery film directed by Joe Roth and starring Samuel L. Jackson, Julianne Moore, Edie Falco, Ron Eldard, William Forsythe, Aunjanue Ellis, and Anthony Mackie. It is based on Richard Price's 1998 novel of the same name, which touches on themes of covert racism. Freedomland was released by Sony Pictures Releasing on February 17, 2006. The film performed poorly at the box office, grossing $14.7 million against a $30 million budget, and received mixed-to-negative reviews.

== Plot ==
Brenda walks through a predominantly African American housing project and enters an emergency room in a daze, apparently in shock and with cut and bleeding hands. Police detective Lorenzo Council is sent to take a statement from her. She says that her car has been stolen. When Lorenzo gets there, she reveals that her young son, Cody, was in the back seat of the car. The police frantically begin searching for him.

Brenda's brother, Danny, a police officer in a neighboring town, calls a massive police presence in to search the housing project for clues. This angers the residents who protest their innocence. Lorenzo begins to suspect that Brenda is holding back details from him and pressures her to tell the truth. She insists that she has told the truth and would never harm her son. With a sketch artist she produces a picture of the man she says stole her car. Danny's white coworkers arrest a man from the housing project who they think matches the picture. Danny flies into a rage and beats him.

Desperate to find Cody, Lorenzo enlists the aid of a volunteer group which helps search for missing children. He suggests that they search Freedomland, an abandoned foundling hospital nearby. As they search, the group's leader Karen Collucci talks with Brenda. She had lost her own son years before and convinces Brenda to admit that Cody is dead. She leads them to a nearby park where they find Cody's body in a shallow grave, covered with heavy rocks.

Lorenzo realizes that Brenda could not have moved the rocks herself. Under interrogation Brenda admits to having been engaged in an affair with a man named Billy who lived in the projects. She would give Cody cough syrup so that he would fall asleep and she could visit Billy.

On the night in question, before Brenda had gone out, Cody had begged her not to leave and insisted she'd regret it. Desperate, believing it would be the last time she'd get to meet up with Billy, she went anyway. When Brenda had returned she'd found Cody dead, having drunk the whole bottle of cough syrup. Billy helped her bury his body.

When the police go to arrest Billy, they are confronted by residents angry over previous unfounded police harassment and a riot erupts. Brenda is charged with criminal neglect, and Lorenzo promises to visit her in jail.

== Cast ==
- Samuel L. Jackson as Detective Lorenzo Council
- Julianne Moore as Brenda Martin
- Edie Falco as Karen Collucci
- Ron Eldard as Detective Danny Martin
- William Forsythe as Detective Bobby Boyle
- Aunjanue Ellis as Felicia
- Anthony Mackie as Billy Williams
- LaTanya Richardson as Marie
- Clarke Peters as Reverend Longway
- Peter Friedman as Lieutenant Gold
- Domenick Lombardozzi as Leo Sullivan
- Aasif Mandvi as Dr. Anil Chatterjee
- Sharon Washington as Rose
- Philip Bosco as Priest
- Dorian Missick as Jason Council
- Colman Domingo as Male Patient
- Marlon Sherman as Cody
- Donald Cebron as Detective

== Production ==
In September 2000, it was reported Paramount Pictures based producer Scott Rudin intended to fast track an adaptation of the Freedomland by Richard Price in the hopes of avoiding potential strikes by the Screen Actors Guild and the Writers Guild of America. However, by December Rudin was reportedly holding off on moving forward until after the labor disputes had settled and that Sydney Pollack was interested in directing. In April 2002, it was reported that Rudin had hired Price to write the screen adaptation of Freedomland which had just been completed. In November 2004, it was Revolution Studios had entered into negotiations to acquire Freedomland after Paramount put the film into turnaround as Revolution head Joe Roth stated it was his favorite Richard Price book. Samuel L. Jackson and Julianne Moore were in negotiations to star in the film, with Moore having been attached only for her deal to be voided once Paramount put the film into Turnaround. In order to make the film for a $30 million budget, both Jackson and Moore took pay cuts on the film.

Shooting took place mostly in Yonkers, New York.

== Release ==
Initially, Sony Pictures announced Freedomland would be released in Los Angeles and New York City on December 23, 2005, prior to nationwide expansion on January 13, 2006, in order to qualify for the Academy Awards. Revolution ultimately decided to cancel their attempt at an award qualifying run and pushed Freedomland back to February 17, 2006, as according to Revolution executive Tom Sherak the film played a bit more broadly than they anticipated and pivoted their release strategy toward marketing Freedomland in a similar manner to Ransom.

=== Home media ===
The film was released on DVD on May 30, 2006, with no special features. The film debuted on the Blu-ray format for the first time on November 6, 2012, by Mill Creek Entertainment. It was included in a double feature with the horror film The Messengers (2007).

== Reception ==
=== Box office ===
The film grossed $14.7 million against its $30 million budget.

=== Critical reception ===
On Rotten Tomatoes, the film has an approval rating of 22% based on 145 reviews. The consensus states: "Poorly directed and overacted, Freedomland attempts to address sensitive race and class issues but its overzealousness misses the mark." On Metacritic, it has a score of 43 out of 100 based on 35 reviews. Audiences surveyed by CinemaScore gave the film a grade C+ on scale of A to F.

Roger Ebert gave the film an overall negative review, and awarded the film 2 out of 4 stars, writing: "Freedomland assembles the elements for a superior thriller, but were the instructions lost when the box was opened? It begins with a compelling story about a woman whose car is hijacked with her 4-year-old son inside. It adds racial tension, and the bulldog detective work of a veteran police detective. Then, it flies to pieces with unmotivated scenes, inexplicable dialogue, and sudden conclusions which may be correct but arrive from nowhere. The film seems edited none too wisely from a longer version that made more sense."

Sheri Linden of The Hollywood Reporter wrote: "The film is, above all, a moving portrait of hurting souls, brought to life in compelling performances." Brian Lowry of Variety wrote: "Despite a few raw moments, pic feels like a Lifetime movie with a marquee cast."

In a more positive review, James Berardinelli awarded the film 3 out of 4 stars, writing: "The thing that makes Freedomland riveting is the way in which its tale of human tragedy unfolds. Although it begins by looking like a big screen episode of CSI, it develops into something more sublime and disturbing. This isn't a mystery in the conventional sense, but it's about secrets hidden and revealed, and the corrosive power of guilt. Even as Council probes into the dark recesses of Brenda's psyche, he seeks to exorcise his own demons. The two form an unlikely connection, the nature of which cannot be revealed without spoiling the ending. But don't expect any last-minute twists or turns. The movie doesn't employ sensationalist tactics to enhance its potency."
