= Bloodbrothers (Price novel) =

1976 novel by Richard Price

- First edition
- Author: Richard Price
- Language: English
- Publisher: Houghton Mifflin
- Publication date: 1976
- Publication place: United States
- Pages: 271
- ISBN: 0-395-24303-3
- Preceded by: The Wanderers
- Followed by: Ladies' Man

Bloodbrothers is a novel by Richard Price, published in 1976. It recounts the story of an eighteen-year-old boy growing up in a working-class environment. It was adapted into a film of the same title in 1978.

== Critical reception ==
New York wrote that "Price intensifies the themes of The Wanderers—the end of adolescent freedom, the cruelty of parents who despise what they’ve become and take it out on their kids, the paralyzing fear that comes with choosing a future among meager options." Kirkus Reviews wrote that "although the characters draw their only life from the frenetic, stabbing speechways echoing down Price's mean streets, this does not diminish the validity or impact of men on the march to nowhere."
