= Murder of Nicole duFresne =

American murder victim

- Location: Lower East Side, Manhattan, New York City
- Date: January 27, 2005; 21 years ago 3:00 a.m. (EST)
- Deaths: 1
- Charges: Fleming: Murder in the first degree, Robbery in the first degree (2), Attempted robbery (4), Criminal possession of a weapon Simmons and Evans: Robbery in the first degree
- Convicted: Rudy Fleming, Servisio Simmons, Ashley Evans

Nicole duFresne (January 5, 1977 – January 27, 2005) was an American playwright and actress. She was murdered on a sidewalk on Manhattan's Lower East Side when a group of seven teens accosted and mugged a group consisting of duFresne, her fiancé Jeffrey Sparks, her close friend Mary Jane Gibson and Gibson's boyfriend Scott Nath sometime after 3:00 a.m. on January 27, 2005.

== Events ==
In the early morning hours of January 27, 2005, duFresne, Sparks, Gibson and Nath were returning home from a night of celebratory drinking. DuFresne had just started a new interim job as a bartender at the Rockwood Music Hall. As duFresne's group was walking down bistro-lined Clinton Street on the Lower East Side of Manhattan, a group of five young men and two girls approached them, "spoiling for a fight and looking for victims." The group had already mugged a man for his leather jacket and menaced a girl at a subway station that same night. According to testimony by another member of the group, Rudy Fleming stated, "I'd like to bang on these people right here." Ashley Evans, an 18-year-old girl in the group, later told police, "They were so extremely happy, so that made me even angrier."

Fleming demanded money. Sparks pushed his way past, at which point Fleming swung with both hands, striking him across his left temple with a Taurus .357 magnum, which he had been holding pointed downward at the sidewalk. According to Sparks neither he nor anyone else in the group had realized that Fleming had a gun. Another robber, Servisio Simmons, reportedly said, "It doesn't have to be like this. My friend's buggin'. We just want the money."

Fleming took Gibson's purse and cell phone and gave them to the girls, Ashley Evans and Tatiana McDonald. DuFresne turned to Sparks who was dazed and bleeding profusely from his left eye, asking if he was okay. He indicated that he was and said "Let's just go". Nath took Sparks by the arm and they ran away, north on Clinton toward Rivington Street. Gibson turned to follow.

According to New York Times reporting of the trial, duFresne then confronted the attackers. “What are you going to do, you going to shoot us? Is that what you wanted?” duFresne demanded. As she shouted those words, she walked up to Rudy Fleming and looked him in the eye. Fleming reacted by pushing duFresne in the chest with his left hand. DuFresne stumbled backward, then bounced back and shouted her question again: “What are you going to do, shoot us?” Fleming pushed duFresne a second time, and when she came at him again, he lifted his right arm and fired one bullet. The bullet struck duFresne in the chest and exited through her back.

From further up the block Sparks and Nath ran back, only to find duFresne on her back in the street. She died a few minutes later in Sparks's arms, as Gibson and Nath knelt beside them.

== Legal proceedings ==
On October 12, 2006, Fleming was found guilty of first degree murder, two counts of robbery, four counts of attempted robbery, and one count of criminal possession of a weapon. Fleming was on parole for pointing a gun at a truancy officer at the time of duFresne's murder.

On December 11, 2006, Fleming was sentenced to life in prison without the possibility of parole, plus an additional 15 years for the robbery committed earlier that night and 15 years for unlawful possession of a weapon.

Fleming appealed on the basis of mental instability and other legal issues raised during the trial. In December 2010, an appeals court found he had been fit for trial and was faking or amplifying his mental illness. The court rebuffed the arguments made on the other legal issues and upheld the conviction. Fleming's accomplices were charged and tried separately.

On February 27, 2007, Servisio Simmons, a cousin of Fleming who took part in the attack, was sentenced to ten years in prison as part of a plea deal in which he pleaded guilty to first-degree robbery and agreed not to appeal.

On April 26, 2007, Ashley Evans, Fleming's girlfriend and the instigator of the attack, was sentenced to six years in prison as part of a plea deal in which she pleaded guilty to first-degree robbery. Evans reportedly told police that she decided to start a fight with one of the women in the group because they annoyed her by being cheerful and laughing. In court, duFresne's mother forgave Evans but criticized the six-year sentence, telling Evans she will still have most of her life ahead when she emerges from prison, but her daughter is gone forever. Evans, 18 at the time of the attack, was released on parole in 2010.

Sparks said of his fiancée's actions in confronting Fleming: "It makes it sound like she was asking for it. She didn't mean, 'I dare you to shoot me. She meant, 'It would be smart if you stopped pointing the gun at me so I can turn around and walk away and you can walk away.'"

== In media ==
- The May 8, 2005 episode of Law & Order: Criminal Intent entitled "The Unblinking Eye" contained a murder scene similar to duFresne's death.
- The plot of Richard Price's 2008 novel Lush Life revolves around a homicide similar to Nicole duFresne's.
