= Clockers (novel) =

1992 book by Richard Price

- First edition
- Author: Richard Price
- Language: English
- Genre: Crime
- Publisher: Houghton Mifflin
- Publication date: 1992
- Publication place: United States
- Media type: Print (hardback & paperback)
- ISBN: 0-06-093498-0
- OCLC: 45963011
- Dewey Decimal: 813/.54 21
- LC Class: PS3566.R544 C56 2001
- Preceded by: The Breaks
- Followed by: Freedomland

Clockers is a 1992 novel by American author Richard Price.

The book takes place in the fictitious city of Dempsey (based on Newark and Jersey City) in New Jersey. It centers on the workings of a local drug gang and the dynamics between the drug dealers, the police and the community.

In 1995, director Spike Lee adapted the story as a film. Price has stated that The Wire creator David Simon told him the first two seasons were based on Clockers before being asked to work directly on the show. Simon has claimed inspiration for the show's structure and multiple points of view.

== Plot ==
Clockers follows intertwining storylines of low level cocaine dealer Ronald "Strike" Dunham and homicide detective Rocco Klein in the fictional New Jersey city of Dempsey (which shares many similarities with Jersey City, New Jersey, where author Richard Price spent extensive time researching the subject matter). Strike works in the drug organization of Rodney Little, a friendly but violent drug lieutenant of local drug lord Champ. When Rodney Little asks Strike to kill his second in command Darryl and take his position, Strike hesitates. While scoping out Ahab's, the fish restaurant from where Darryl wholesales cocaine, he encounters his brother Victor drunk in a bar across the street, to whom he tells a made-up story about Darryl's abuse of his girlfriend. Victor apparently sees through his story, and suggests that if Strike needs someone killed, he knows "My Man" who could do the job. Strike is surprised by this offer from his law-abiding, working-man brother, and responds noncommittally, assuming his remark is just a drunken boast. He is shocked the next day to find that Darryl has been shot dead in the Ahab's parking lot by an unknown assailant.

David "Rocco" Klein and his partner Larry Mazilli are assigned to investigate Darryl's murder. They quickly deduce that Darryl was more than just a restaurant manager. Meanwhile, Strike is promoted in Rodney's organization and is introduced to Papi, a Puerto Rican cocaine wholesaler. Rodney reveals that he has been buying cocaine from Papi and selling it behind Champ's back, without giving him a cut. Strike recognizes that Champ will have them both killed if he discovers their side business, but agrees to participate, believing he has no other choice.

Rodney brings Strike to meet with Champ at his headquarters at the O'Brien housing projects. Rodney brings an undercover police officer who he introduces to Champ as a cocaine supplier, as part his plan to sabotage Champ and take control of the organization. There, Strike encounters Champ's chief violent enforcer, Buddha Hat, a murderous man who cryptically identifies Strike as "Victor's brother." Strike takes this to mean that Buddha Hat was Victor's "My Man" and that he had killed Darryl. As Buddha Hat worked for Champ, and Darryl was the previous overseer of Rodney's secret drug sales, Strike assumes that Buddha Hat will realize their treachery and tell Champ, who would have them both killed.

Buddha Hat pays Strike a perplexing visit, where Strike, thinking he is about to be killed, is instead taken to a restaurant and peep show in New York, in a bizarre gesture of friendship by Buddha Hat. Victor gives a full confession for Darryl's murder, but his self-defense story does not match witness accounts and Rocco believes that he is in fact innocent. His obsessive investigation begins to lead him to Strike, who he believes is a much more likely murderer than the hard working and law-abiding Victor. Assuming that Victor will take a mandatory 30-year sentence to protect his brother, Rocco confronts Strike at his drug corner and forcibly takes him in for questioning several times. Strike goes to meet Papi to pick up the week's cocaine shipment but finds him shot to death. Strike panics, fearing that Champ is on to him and Rodney. He later learns from Rodney that Buddha Hat also went behind Champ's back to take a bit of Papi's profits, and murdered him when he refused to pay.

When Rodney is arrested selling cocaine to an undercover police officer, Rocco arranges things so that Rodney believes Strike has been talking to police. Rodney then sends his enforcer, Errol Barnes, to murder him. Rocco, whose marriage is in serious trouble because of the tremendous amount of work he has taken on, brings in Strike for another round of questioning. He also talks again with Victor and his mother. They reveal that Victor did indeed commit the murder in a moment when, hating his difficult life and ungrateful wife, he impulsively decided to murder Darryl just as Strike had suggested, using a gun he had earlier found and kept.

At about the same time, Errol Barnes, despite a fearsome reputation for violence, is shot and killed by Strike's panicked young assistant Tyrone, who had been on his way to return Strike's gun after borrowing it out of curiosity. Strike goes free but is still being threatened by Rodney. Also, local cop Andre "The Giant", who was a father figure to Tyrone, beats Strike and threatens to kill him for ruining Tyrone's life unless he leaves Dempsy permanently. The novel ends with Rocco driving Strike into NYC, where, while at the Greyhound station, a drug mule tries to get Strike to buy him a bus ticket. After Strike is almost arrested by the police, he buys a See America pass and leaves the city.

== Writing style ==
David Denby of New York magazine said that the novel was "filled with operational detail" related to the drug trade. It discusses mechanisms such as division of crack cocaine into "bottles" and cutting of drugs.

== Critical reception ==
The New York Times wrote that the book "manages to come across as both clear-eyed and bighearted, able to illuminate and celebrate, in the midst of the most unpromising circumstances imaginable, a cop's heroism and a small-time drug dealer's stubborn resilience, without overly sentimentalizing either." Kirkus Reviews called Clockers "a vital and bold novel rich in unexpected pleasure, with Price generally avoiding melodrama, sentimentality, and stereotype to portray a harsh world with cleareyed compassion."

== In other media ==
In 1995, director Spike Lee adapted the story for the film Clockers. David Denby of New York magazine said that the film adaptation was "more emotional" and "less factual" relative to the original novel. Lee co-wrote the screenplay with Price.

The book served as an inspiration for the hit drama The Wire, where Price served as a writer, working closely with the show's creator, David Simon.
