= Bloodbrothers (1978 film) =

1978 film

- Theatrical release poster
- Directed by: Robert Mulligan
- Screenplay by: Walter Newman
- Based on: Bloodbrothers by Richard Price
- Produced by: Stephen J. Friedman
- Starring: Paul Sorvino; Tony Lo Bianco; Richard Gere
- Cinematography: Robert L. Surtees
- Edited by: Sheldon Kahn
- Music by: Elmer Bernstein
- Distributed by: Warner Bros. Pictures
- Release date: October 6, 1978
- Running time: 116 minutes
- Country: United States
- Language: English
- Budget: $4 million

Bloodbrothers is a 1978 coming-of-age film directed by Robert Mulligan, and starring Richard Gere, Paul Sorvino, Tony Lo Bianco and Marilu Henner. It was based on the 1976 novel by Richard Price. It was nominated for an Academy Award for Best Adapted Screenplay.

== Plot ==
The film narrates the coming-of-age story of a teenager hailing from an Italian-American working-class family, specifically a household of construction workers in the Bronx. Tommy De Coco and his brother Louis, affectionately known as Chubby due to his robust build, toil as laborers on construction sites, embodying the life and family values prevalent among immigrant Italians in the working-class milieu of the Bronx. This includes the macho posturing of men, the traditional role of the wife in the kitchen, the marriage to a virtuous girl, and the premarital exploration among vivacious, pleasure-seeking women. Numerous issues remain unaddressed, and the family grapples with finding solutions to certain behaviors, such as the younger son Albert's refusal to eat, leading to the development of an eating disorder.

Stony De Coco, Tommy's elder son, finds himself torn between his allegiance to the family and the desire to break free from the described social context. While Tommy dreams of a joint venture, envisaging "De Coco and Son" working together on a construction site, Stony envisions a different path; he aspires to work with children. Through the intervention of a well-meaning doctor, he seizes the opportunity to work as a rehabilitation assistant on a children's ward in a hospital, delving into the realm of working with children. There, he discovers fulfillment, delighting in narrating uplifting stories to the young ones. However, in the eyes of Tommy, such endeavors are deemed as women's work.

In search of support beyond his immediate family, Stony forges a romantic relationship. After parting ways with Cheri, a spirited young woman, he embarks on a relationship with Annette, a disco waitress, who becomes his pillar of support in challenging his father's macho traditions, particularly the patterns of excessive alcohol consumption and the treatment of women. Adding further complexity to the familial dynamic, Stony's mother, Marie, grapples with borderline personality disorder.

Stony grapples with the egocentrism and harsh methods of his father but is reluctant to completely sever ties with the family. He must carve out his own path. The film concludes with Stony leaving the family, accompanied by his psychologically distressed brother Albert.

== Cast ==
- Paul Sorvino as Louis "Chubby" De Coco
- Tony Lo Bianco as Thomas "Tommy" De Coco Sr.
- Richard Gere as Thomas "Stony" De Coco Jr.
- Lelia Goldoni as Marie De Coco
- Yvonne Wilder as Phyllis De Coco
- Marilu Henner as Annette Palladino
- Kenneth McMillan as Mikey Banion
- Floyd Levine as Dr. Ralph Harris
- Kim Milford as Bobby Butler
- Michael Hershewe as Albert "Tiger" De Coco
- Lila Teigh as Mrs. Cutler
- Kristine DeBell as Cheri
- Robert Englund as Mott
- Gloria LeRoy as Sylvia
- Damu King as "Chili" Mac
- Paulene Myers as Mrs. Pitt
- Danny Aiello as Artie Di Falco
- Raymond Singer as Jackie Cutler
- Bruce French as Paulie
- Peter Iacangelo as Malfie
- Eddie Jones as "Blackie"
- E. Brian Dean as Brian (credited as Brian Dean)
- Randy Jurgensen as Randy
- Ron McLarty as Mac
- David Berman as Dave Stern
- Robert Costanzo as Victor "Vic" (credited as Bob Costanzo)
- Edwin Owens as Stan (credited as Ed Owens)
- Tom Signorelli as Sig
- Kennedy Gordy as Tyrone
- Jeffrey Jacquet as Derek

== Response ==
The film opened to positive reviews, and though it would be forgotten about in later years, it was liked for the ensemble cast. As one of the De Coco sons, Richard Gere was especially praised. The film also introduced Marilu Henner.

Ryan McDonald of Shameless Self Expression said: "This 1978 Robert Mulligan tale about a seriously dysfunctional Italian-American family is too broadly played, stereotyped, and overly familiar... This is all very shouty and somewhat overbearing stuff for a story that isn’t all that memorable to begin with. ... Tony Lo Bianco and especially an unrestrained Lelia Goldoni are the worst offenders. Lo Bianco, often typecast as (an) Italian-American hood, gives us a stereotype of Italian-American machismo, misogyny, occasional brutality, and just general hamminess. Occasionally there seems to be a real character in there, but largely it’s just too much of a ‘performance’... But at least he has his moments, which cannot be said for the ghastly Goldoni, whose shrieking, mugging, wailing ... coupled with a pathetic, basically psychotic character derail the film. ... The most enjoyable work comes from Paul Sorvino, Marilu Henner, and Kenneth McMillan..."

== Awards ==
- Nominee Best Adapted Screenplay - Academy Awards (Walter Newman)
- Nominee Best Adapted Screenplay - Writers Guild of America (Walter Newman)
