= Lazarus Man =

2024 novel by Richard Price

- Author: Richard Price
- Language: English
- Genre: Literary fiction
- Publisher: Farrar, Straus and Giroux
- Publication date: November 12, 2024
- Publication place: United States
- Pages: 352
- ISBN: 978-0-374-16815-5

Lazarus Man is a 2024 novel by Richard Price. It was released on November 12, 2024.

== Synopsis ==
After the collapse of an apartment building in East Harlem in 2008, the surrounding neighborhood struggles to come to terms with the disaster.

== Development ==
Price was inspired to write the novel after the 2014 East Harlem gas explosion, which caused multiple buildings to collapse and killed eight people. Price lived several blocks away from the collapsed building and spent time observing the scene. In an interview on NPR's Fresh Air, Price said that he wrote the bulk of the novel during the COVID-19 pandemic.

=== Publication history ===
Lazarus Man was published in the United States by Farrar, Straus and Giroux. It was released on November 12, 2024.

== Reception ==
Associated Press opined that the novel benefited from Price's screenwriting experience, noting that the character shifts were easy to follow and praising the unconventional story structure. The Boston Globe wrote that the book's characters were diverse and that the novel highlighted the "racial and religious identities" present in New York City. The Los Angeles Times and the San Francisco Chronicle concurred, with the former complimenting the novel's dialogue and the latter naming Price "the bard of everyday life in America." The Atlantic was also positive, noting connections between the novel's themes and the philosophy of Jean-Paul Sartre.

Laura Miller, writing for Slate, praised the interactions between the characters and noted that the novel's lack of plot allowed for the characters to be explored in more depth. Miller positively compared the book to Deacon King Kong by James McBride. The Wall Street Journal similarly praised the characters. The Washington Post's review, written by Ron Charles, praised the novel's structure and Price's writing for giving each character an individual voice. Kirkus Reviews was positive, positively describing the prose and describing the novel as being "kinder and gentler" than Price's previous work. Publishers Weekly published a starred review praising Price's attention to detail in describing the street life of New York City. Booklist was also positive.

By contrast, The New York Times Book Review panned the book, directing mild praise at its characters but criticizing its tone and overall structure for "[elid]ing the sense that there's no story."
