= The Whites (novel) =

2015 detective novel by Harry Brandt (Richard Price)

- Author: Richard Price
- Language: English
- Genre: Fiction
- Published: February 17, 2015
- Publisher: Henry Holt and Company
- Publication place: United States

The Whites is a 2015 detective novel written by Richard Price under the pen name Harry Brandt. The book was published on February 17, 2015.

== Critical reception ==
The New York Times called The Whites "a work of reportage as much as it is a work of fiction. That’s what makes it important. It tells it like it is. It provides insight and knowledge, both rare qualities in the killing fields of the crime novel."

== Adaptations ==
In August 22, 2014, Scott Rudin was set to produce a film adaptation of the novel for Sony Pictures. On June 16, 2022, Showtime was set to produce a limited television series adaptation of the novel with Ethan Hawke set to star in and executive produce.
