= The Wanderers (Price novel) =

Novel by Richard Price

- First edition
- Author: Richard Price
- Language: English
- Genre: Dramedy; Coming of age
- Publisher: Houghton Mifflin, Boston
- Publication date: 1974
- Publication place: United States
- Media type: Print (hard cover)
- Pages: 239 pages
- ISBN: 0-395-18477-0
- Followed by: Bloodbrothers

The Wanderers is a novel by the American author Richard Price. It was first published as a book in 1974. The plot is set in the Bronx, New York City, from mid-1962 to mid-1963.

== Writing and publication ==
Price was 24 years old when The Wanderers, was published. It was his first novel, and the setting of the story is a housing project in the Bronx, New York, which is similar to that in which Price grew up.

The book contains 12 chapters, which are loosely connected with each other, mainly by reappearing characters. It is more like a collection of short stories—each chapter can stand on its own. A conventional encompassing plot is missing. However, there is a thread: the protagonists are forced to mature, each one in his own way, toward the end of the book.

Parts of the book were published as the story "Big Playground" in Antaeus, New York City, in 1972.

Regarding the year(s) in which the story takes place there is an inconsistency. In the first chapter, it reads 12 September 1962. In chapter 5, Thanksgiving and 27 November 1962 are explicitly mentioned, as well as Valentine's Day in one of the following chapters. Then, in chapter 11, it reads 1 June 1962 on the wedding invitation given out by Buddy Borsalino. It might be an author's inaccuracy or a misprint.

The Wanderers was first published at Houghton Mifflin, Boston, Massachusetts, USA in 1974. Reprints and publications at other publishers followed, such as:

- Avon Books, New York, USA, 1975. Paperback. ISBN 0-380-00242-6.
- Chatto & Windus, London, UK, 1975. Hardcover. ISBN 0-7011-2096-7.
- Rowohlt, Reinbek, GER, 1976. 1st German paperback edition (German title “Scharfe Zeiten”). ISBN 3-499-14540-5.
- Bloomsbury Publishing Limited, London, UK, 1993. 1st paperback edition. ISBN 0-7475-1503-4.

== Plot ==
Richie Gennaro is the 17-year-old leader of the Wanderers, an Italian-American youth gang in the Bronx in 1962. His girlfriend is Denise Rizzo. Richie's friends in the Wanderers are Joey Capra, Buddy Borsalino, Eugene Caputo and Perry LaGuardia.

At the beginning of the book, a broad range of events and characters describe the zeitgeist. In addition to the protagonists, many characters appear only once. At first, “gang-business” is in focus: rivalry with other gangs in the neighborhood who come from different cultural and/or ethnic backgrounds. This rivalry is determined by prejudice and machismo. But there is also competition, in terms of sports such as football and bowling. And above all, it is about being cool and trying to have sex for the first time.

Toward the end of the book, the events focus more and more on the protagonists and their problems and challenges of growing up – everyone in his own way. Eugene joins the marines after watching, without interfering, his girlfriend, Nina, being raped. Perry's father had died several years ago; now his mother dies, and he's suddenly on his own. Living with his aunt in Trenton, New Jersey, becomes unbearable for him, so he decides to go to Boston and sail to sea. After the situation escalates, Joey flees from his violent father and joins Perry. And Buddy impregnates his girlfriend, Despie, on their very first date and has to face the challenges of being a 17-year-old husband and father.

The serious side of life is catching up, the gang is falling apart, and Richie is staying behind.

== Characters ==
=== Major characters ===
- Richie Gennaro, 17 years old, is the head of the Wanderers. His father, Louis, and his mother, Millie, both 41 years old, run a rather conservative household with a reasonable income, since there's always plenty of good food on the table. Louis accuses Richie of being ungrateful for what he does for him. Apart from that, Richie's family background is pretty normal. Richie has a 12-year-old brother, Randy, and a girlfriend, Denise. Richie is desperately trying to get laid.
- Denise Rizzo, called C, 15 years old, is Richie's girlfriend. Her parents often have arguments and yell at each other in front of the children. They both blame one another for lack of respect. C stands for comb, since Denise always has a pink comb handy. C has a little brother, Dougie. She is not yet ready for her first time with Richie.
- Joey Capra is short, smokes, and has much nervous energy, never standing still. Joey's best friend is Perry. Joey is afraid of his brutal father. There's permanent tension in his home because of his father's conceit and chauvinism.
- Mario Borsalino, called Buddy, is anxious to get laid: when he does, he gets Despinoza "Despie" Carabella pregnant.
- Despie Carabella, a friend of C's. They go to the same school, and she later becomes Buddy's love interest, and eventually, wife, after he impregnates her.
- Eugene Caputo, whom his father calls him "Ace", lives with his parents in their house. He's a womanizer, keeping score of his conquests. Eugene's major activity is chasing girls, although he has a complex: because of his penis pointing downward when erected, he thinks he's impotent. Consequently, he's always insulting girls, to make them run off before sex occurs. He is afraid of falling in love, but when does, it leads to tragic consequences.
- Perry LaGuardia, 19 years old, a tall, beefy guy, who has problems at home involving his mother, and his brother's absence, to deal with, as well as his rivalry with Emilio, Joey's father.

=== Minor characters ===
- Turkey is ugly and alone, but of high intelligence, with flippy parents and a cheap sister. Turkey is Jewish, yet collecting Nazi paraphernalia. He can draw, sing and speak German. He occasionally hangs out with the Wanderers.
- Dougie Rizzo, C's brother, he is malicious with an evil streak. Causes much trouble for Richie, but is paid back in full by Randy Gennaro and his gang.
- Scotty Hite is Dougie Rizzo's friend, that is, Scotty is Dougie's punching ball, until Scotty dares standing up. Regarding this as mutiny, Dougie tricks Scotty to jump off the roof of a tall building – to death.
- Randy Gennaro, Richie's little brother, he is called upon to get revenge against Dougie for causing Richie trouble against the African-American students at his school
- Antone is the head of the Pharaohs. After calling a truce with the Wanderers, he turns around and almost hurts the Wanderers, if not for the intervention of Turkey.
- Lenny Arkadian owns the sign-painting shop, where the Wanderers sometimes hang out after school. Lenny is more of an entertainer than a business man. He served in the Navy and is the one painting the football banner for the Stingers (football team of the Wanderers). Apparently, Lenny has a lot of experience with women and is Richie's advisor in how to get laid. He finally makes arrangements with a hooker for Richie's first time.
- Joey DiMassi is leader of the Fordham Baldies, respected for his fairness and decency. But he tires of being a Baldie, and the nail in the coffin, is when all the good members in a drunken stupor, sign up for the US Navy.
- Terror, cross-eyed, 150 pounds, six foot four is the war machine of the Fordham Baldies. He has asthma. His mother is said to be Mexican.
- Clinton Stitch is the head of the Pips.
- Raymond LaGuardia is Perry's brother, and married with a wife and kids, he neglects his mother and brother after the death of their father. After their mother's death, Perry refuses to have anything to do with him
- Nancy and Marie are two girls Buddy and Eugene meet at a bar, Nancy is crosseyed, Marie has a face full of acne, and the two wear hearing aids, but it is with Nancy that Eugene pops his cherry
- Emilio Capra is Joey's father. He is a fireman. He has a humiliating and rather violent way of raising his son and treating his wife. Emilio was Mister New York City 1940, and is still in good shape. He is an egomaniac and has no respect for his son, who is not at all like him. He likes teasing Joey to the point of distress and giving him a hard time whenever possible. He also has a rivalry with Perry, being the same size.
- Chubby Galasso, A Bowling gambler, he and his five brothers run a racket at the local bowling alley.
- Peppy Dio, an older man who works in the bar at the bowling alley, he is the uncle of the Galasso brothers, helping them with their racket.
- Mr. Sharp, an ex-gang member turned teacher, he hates Puerto Ricans, and teaches all the students of his class a simple lesson about racism.
- Nina Becker, Eugene's later girlfriend, he falls in love with her, but after witnessing her rape by a black guy, he leaves her.

== Reception ==
The Wanderers received mostly positive reviews. Kirkus Reviews called the book "a fine first novel — gritty, incisive, unpatronizing, authentic in its detail, able to recreate a dead era and deal with the American male myth (city-style) while somehow managing miraculously to avoid both pomposity and sentimentality." New York called it "a powerhouse," writing that "the book is raunchy, violent, tender, cruel, and laugh-your-ass-off funny."

== Adaptations ==
=== Film ===
Wanderers logo used in the 1979 film

The Wanderers was filmed in 1979 by Philip Kaufman. The first Avon Books printing from February 1975 refers to the upcoming movie ("SOON A MAJOR MOTION PICTURE"). The artwork of the title on the front cover of the same book may have been the inspiration for the 'Wanderers logo' on the back of the uniform jackets in the film.

The major differences between book and film are Despie is Richie's girlfriend and made Chubby's daughter, Buddy is made a minor character, Eugene and C are nonexistent, Nina becomes Joey's love interest and Nina's rape never occurs. Instead, she kisses Richie in the back of his car, becoming his main love interest which betrays Joey. However disappointed with all their boys lifestyles, Richie sees her "disappear" and becoming more interested and heading into a higher spiritual road along the intellectual Youth Force that will lead the 1960s away from the 1950s in which his gang were still lingering, and way ahead incomprehensible for him at the verge of settling into a married man life. Witnessing the assassination of President Kennedy on a store-window TV set made him realize that change was spinning and speeding up in the nation as a whole, as well as in him and his peers as they transitioned from teens to young adults.
