= Clockers (film) =

1995 film directed by Spike Lee

- Theatrical release poster
- Directed by: Spike Lee
- Screenplay by: Richard Price; Spike Lee
- Based on: Clockers by Richard Price
- Produced by: Martin Scorsese; Spike Lee; Jon Kilik
- Starring: Harvey Keitel; John Turturro; Delroy Lindo; Mekhi Phifer; Isaiah Washington; Keith David
- Cinematography: Malik Hassan Sayeed
- Edited by: Sam Pollard
- Music by: Terence Blanchard
- Production company: 40 Acres and a Mule Filmworks
- Distributed by: Universal Pictures
- Release date: September 15, 1995
- Running time: 128 minutes
- Country: United States
- Language: English
- Budget: $25 million
- Box office: $13,071,518

Clockers is a 1995 American crime drama film directed by Spike Lee. It is an adaptation of the 1992 novel of the same name by Richard Price, who also co-wrote the screenplay with Lee. The film stars Harvey Keitel, John Turturro, Delroy Lindo, and Mekhi Phifer in his debut film role. Set in New York City, Clockers tells the story of Strike (Phifer), a street-level drug dealer who becomes entangled in a murder investigation.

The film originally entered production with Martin Scorsese attached to direct; he had previously collaborated with Price on his 1986 film The Color of Money. Scorsese eventually dropped out of production to focus on his passion project Casino, at which point Lee stepped in to direct and rewrite the script, Scorsese remained a co-producer alongside Lee. Clockers was released by Universal Pictures on September 15, 1995 and received generally positive reviews from film critics, but was a box office failure, grossing only around $13,071,518 on a $25 million budget.

== Plot ==
In a Brooklyn housing project, a group of clockers — street-level drug dealers — work for Rodney Little, a local drug lord. Rodney orders Ronald "Strike" Dunham, one of his lead clockers, to kill Darryl Adams, another dealer who has been stealing from him. Strike is reluctant to carry out the killing and asks his brother Victor if he knows someone who could kill Adams.

Later, Homicide detectives Rocco Klein and Larry Mazilli are called to the scene of Adams' murder and learn that Victor has confessed to killing him. Upon interrogation, Victor tells Rocco that he shot Adams in self-defense. Rocco finds holes in this story and examines Victor's background, where he finds that Victor cares for his family, is a responsible employee and has no criminal record, leading Rocco to believe that Victor is covering for his younger brother.

Rodney discusses Darryl's death with Strike. Later, Rodney tells Strike a story of a younger Rodney and Errol, where Errol threatened Rodney at gunpoint to kill a dealer, which he did. Back in the present, he tells Strike the reason Errol forced him at gunpoint to do so was so that Errol could hold something over him if he ever decided to tell on Errol, which was why he told Strike to kill Darryl Adams. Strike and Rodney have a falling-out after Rodney denies telling Strike to kill Darryl.

Rocco pressures Strike, but Victor sticks to his story, so Rocco convinces Rodney that Strike has confessed and informed on Rodney's drug ring. Rocco arrests Rodney and then implicates Strike in front of his crew. Strike tries to play it off and deny that he was involved in Rodney's arrest, but his crew begins to turn on Strike, leading to them labeling him a snitch. Rodney, calling Errol to notify him that he is in jail, puts a hit out on Strike. Strike then gets together some money and decides to leave town.

As Strike leaves his apartment, he sees Errol camped outside of his car with a gun. Strike deduces that Errol is there to kill him and hides. A younger boy who admires Strike, Tyrone, rides up to Errol on a bike and shoots him dead with Strike's gun. Later, Tyrone is taken into custody. With Rocco, Tyrone's mother and Andre listening, Tyrone confesses that he got the gun from Strike. Andre storms out of the interrogation room and proceeds to look for Strike.

Andre angrily beats Strike in front of the whole project, and with a gun threatens the onlooking bystanders to stay back. As Andre threatens to kill Strike if he ever talks to or even looks at the young boy again, Rodney pulls up, which leads to Strike jumping in his own car and driving to the precinct, with Rodney following. Strike runs into Rocco, who now has an arrest warrant for Strike, and runs into the precinct just as Rodney arrives.

Rocco tries to intimidate Strike into confessing to the murder, but he loses his composure when Strike continues to change his story. When Rocco grabs Strike and throws him against the wall, Strike's mother walks in with Mazilli and Victor's wife. She advises Rocco that Victor confessed to the murder immediately when he got home, and how Victor was physically unable to leave his bed. Strike asks his mom what happened to the bail money he gave Victor's wife, which leads to Strike's mother angrily throwing the money in Strike's face.

Meanwhile, Rodney proceeds to damage Strike's car, going as far as breaking the windows, damaging the doors and urinating in the car. Left with no other options and unable to go home, Strike asks Rocco to drive him to Penn Station.

In a car, Rocco threatens to arrest Strike, then arrest Rodney on the same charges and ensure that Rodney and Strike share a cell and a bed in prison. Strike leaves town by train. While Tyrone is playing inside his apartment with the train set that Strike gave him, Rocco and Mazilli respond to the homicide of clocker Scientific. Victor is released from custody.

== Cast ==
- Harvey Keitel as Det. Rocco Klein
- John Turturro as Det. Larry Mazilli
- Delroy Lindo as Rodney Little
- Mekhi Phifer as Ronald "Strike" Dunham
- Isaiah Washington as Victor Dunham
- Keith David as Andre "The Giant" Ashley
- Sticky Fingaz as Andres "Scientific" Atkins
- Regina Taylor as Iris Jeeter
- Fredro as Elvis "Go" Atkins
- Tom Byrd as Errol Barnes
- Lawrence B. Adisa as Stan Gilmore
- Hassan Johnson as Trevor "Skills" Jeeter
- Michael Imperioli as Det. Joey "Jojo" Thompson
- Mike Starr as Det. Shawn "Thumper" Ferrell
- Paul Calderon as Jesus at Hambones
- Lisa Arrindell Anderson as Sharon Dunham
- Spike Lee as Chucky "Big Chucky" Bridges Sr.
- Harry Lennix as Bill Walker
- Michael Badalucco as Michael "Lil Chief" James

== Film poster ==
Critics and film buffs were quick to notice that the poster, designed by Art Sims, was similar to the artwork of Saul Bass for Otto Preminger's 1959 film Anatomy of a Murder. Sims claimed that it was a homage, but Bass regarded it as a rip-off.

== Release ==
=== Critical reception ===
The film received generally positive reviews. On the review aggregator website Rotten Tomatoes, 75% of 65 critics' reviews are positive, with an average rating of 6.90/10. The site's consensus reads, "A work of mournful maturity that sacrifices little of its director's signature energy, Clockers is an admittedly flawed drama with a powerfully urgent message". On Metacritic, the film has a score of 71 out of 100 based on reviews from 20 critics, indicating "generally favorable" reviews. Audiences polled by CinemaScore gave the film an average grade of "B" on an A+ to F scale.

Roger Ebert gave the movie three-and-a-half stars, praising the stark depiction of violence and the drug trade while also praising Lee for finding "poetry and humor in all of his stories." He concluded the review by writing: "Although “Clockers” is, as I suggested, a murder mystery, in solving its murder, it doesn’t even begin to find a solution to the system that led to the murder. That is the point. In a closing scene, Strike asks Rocco, the white cop, what made him care. Rocco does not answer. Instead, he tells Strike, “Don’t ever let me see you in this town again.” Is that the answer? That the infection of drugs and guns is so deep that the only sane action is to get out of town? Maybe, in a symbolic way, it is."

David Denby of New York said that while the original novel was "filled with operational detail" the film adaptation was "more emotional" and "less factual". Denby further explained that Spike Lee was "concerned less with Strike's spiritual condition than with the survival of the entire community." Denby said that Lee, in the work, "jumps around a lot, telling his story in hot flashes" as typical in Spike Lee films, arguing that the technique makes the film "difficult to follow". In regard to the cinematography of Malik Sayeed, Denby said that it was "rough and dark-hued, with an almost tabloid angriness in the scenes of violence."

=== Box office ===
Clockers grossed over $4 million its first weekend and ended its run with over $13 million domestically.

== Soundtrack ==
Clockers (Original Motion Picture Soundtrack)

Soundtrack album by Various artists
- Released: August 25, 1995
- Recorded: 1994–95
- Genres: Hip hop; R&B
- Length: 51:48
- Label: MCA Soundtracks
- Producers: Bill Stephney (exec.); Spike Lee (exec.); Salaam Remi; DJ Trouble; Branford Marsalis; David Gamson; DJ Ali; DJ Premier; Gordon Chambers; Ike Lee III; Prince Sampson; Raymond Jones; Ski; Sean "Uneek" McFadden; Tim Atack; Trevor Horn

Singles from Clockers
- 1. "Return of the Crooklyn Dodgers" Released: 1995; 2. "Love Me Still" Released: August 29, 1995

Professional ratings
Review scores
Source	Rating
AllMusic	4/5 stars

Clockers (Original Motion Picture Soundtrack) was released on August 25, 1995, through MCA Soundtracks. Composed of twelve songs, it features performances from Marc Dorsey, Rebelz of Authority, BrooklyNytes, Buckshot LeFonque, Chaka Khan, Crooklyn Dodgers '95, Des'ree, Mega Banton, Seal and Strictly Difficult. The album made it to #54 on the Billboard Top R&B/Hip-Hop Albums chart in the United States, spawning two singles: "Return of the Crooklyn Dodgers" by Jeru the Damaja, O.C. and Chubb Rock, which peaked at #96 on the Billboard Hot 100, and "Love Me Still" by Chaka Khan.

One song featured in the film but not included in the original motion picture soundtrack is R&B artist Philip Bailey's "Children of the Ghetto," from Bailey's 1984 album Chinese Wall.

=== Track listing ===
No.	Title	Producer(s)	Length
1.	"People in Search of a Life" (performed by Marc Dorsey)	Raymond Jones	6:13
2.	"Love Me Still" (performed by Chaka Khan and Bruce Hornsby)	David Gamson	3:26
3.	"Silent Hero" (performed by Des'ree)	Prince Sampson; Tim Atack	5:01
4.	"Bird of Freedom" (performed by Seal)	Trevor Horn	5:14
5.	"Return of the Crooklyn Dodgers" (performed by Crooklyn Dodgers '95)	DJ Premier	5:04
6.	"Bad Boy No Go a Jail" (performed by Mega Banton)	Salaam Remi	4:22
7.	"Blast of the Iron" (performed by Rebelz of Authority)	Salaam Remi; DJ Trouble (co.)	4:12
8.	"Reality Check" (performed by Buckshot LeFonque)	Branford Marsalis	2:51
9.	"Illa Killa" (performed by Strictly Difficult)	Ski	4:29
10.	"Sex Soldier" (performed by Rebelz of Authority)	DJ Ali; DJ Trouble	3:32
11.	"Reality" (performed by BrooklyNytes)	Uneek	3:23
12.	"Changes" (performed by Marc Dorsey)	Gordon Chambers; Ike Lee	4:13
Total length:			51:48

=== Charts ===
Chart (1995)	Peak position
US Top R&B/Hip-Hop Albums (Billboard)	54

Clockers(Original Orchestra Score)was composed for the movie by Terence Blanchard, and released on Columbia in 1995

== See also ==
- List of hood films
