= The Final Terror =

- US film poster
- Directed by: Andrew Davis
- Screenplay by: Jon George; Neill D. Hicks; Ronald Shusett
- Story by: Jon George; Neill D. Hicks
- Produced by: Joe Roth
- Starring: John Friedrich; Rachel Ward; Adrian Zmed; Mark Metcalf; Daryl Hannah; Ernest Harden Jr.; Akosua Busia; Joe Pantoliano
- Cinematography: Andrew Davis
- Edited by: Paul Rubell; Erica Flaum
- Music by: Susan Justin
- Production company: Arkoff International Pictures
- Distributed by: Comworld Pictures; Aquarius Releasing
- Release date: October 28, 1983
- Running time: 82 minutes
- Country: United States
- Language: English

The Final Terror (released internationally as Carnivore and Campsite Massacre) is a 1983 American horror film directed and photographed by Andrew Davis, and starring John Friedrich, Rachel Ward, Daryl Hannah, Adrian Zmed, Mark Metcalf, Akosua Busia, and Joe Pantoliano. Blending elements of the survival thriller and the slasher film, the story follows a group of campers in the Northern California wilderness who are forced to fight for their lives against a backwoods, feral killer hunting them as prey.

The film was developed by executive producer Samuel Z. Arkoff, who hoped to capitalize on the success of such films as Halloween (1978), Friday the 13th (1980), and The Burning (1981). Arkoff commissioned Joe Roth to produce the film, after which a screenplay was developed by three writers, including Ronald Shusett. Principal photography took place in the fall of 1981, primarily in the Redwood Forests of northern California, as well in southern Oregon, under the working title Bump in the Night.

Though completed in 1981, The Final Terror was shelved for two years as a result of the filmmakers failing to find a distributor. It was eventually released on October 28, 1983 to capitalize on the rising fame of its stars Ward, Hannah, and Zmed. Critical reaction to the film was mixed, with some praising it for its believability, while others admonished it for its incorporation of overlapping dialogue and art film elements. Numerous critics drew comparisons to Deliverance (1972) due to the film's survivalist elements, as well as to its slasher contemporary Friday the 13th. In the intervening years, the film has developed a small cult following.

== Plot ==
A young couple named Jim and Lori lose control of their motorbike while riding in a forest. With Jim hurt, Lori finds no help and returns, only to find Jim dead hanging from a tree before she is killed by a trap. Weeks later, a group of campers consisting of Dennis, Margaret, Windy, Marco, Nathaniel, Boone, Eggar, Vanessa, Mike, and Melanie, arrive at the forest. The group makes a clearing and spend the night around a bonfire telling a story about a young teenager who was raped and became insane, so she was put in a local mental institution, where she gave birth to a baby boy who was taken from her. When the boy was 19, he took his mother from the institution and released her to live in the forest.

The next morning, the group discover that Marco and Eggar are missing. While the others search for them, Mike takes a swim with Melanie and later they have sex, during which Mike is stabbed to death by a camouflaged killer who then kidnaps Melanie. Nathaniel and Dennis find an abandoned cabin containing an old grave. Dennis enters the cabin and Nathaniel hears him scream, only for it to be a prank by Dennis trying to scare him. While searching the cabin for food and items, they find a severed wolf's head in a cabinet and are shaken before returning to the camp.

That night, the killer appears near Margaret in her sleep and she hysterically tells the others what she saw. The campers also find Marco, who has returned to the camp. After Vanessa gets angry at the men for scaring the girls, she walks off alone to the outhouse; she screams when Mike's severed head falls onto her, and the group comes to her aid. The group spends one more night at the camp, and unsuccessfully search for Melanie who they assumed was still with Mike. In the morning they go to the cabin to look for the killer, unaware that he is down in the basement with a captured Melanie, and they flee with the rafts after finding a human hand in a glass jar. While rafting along the river, the body of Melanie is tossed onto the boat by the killer which causes panic among the group. Burying Melanie near the river, the group continues on to the end of the river and find their empty, broken-down bus. They spend the night there, but the killer attacks and gets inside the bus before the group escapes out the back door. Windy gets separated and is slashed by the killer, where the group comes to her and gives her first aid.

In the morning, the group gathers supplies and camouflages themselves. They find a knocked over redwood tree and devise an ambush on Eggar. Dennis climbs one of the highest trees, where he sets a spiked log trap. Marco begins calling out for Eggar, who appears and begins to strangle Marco with a rope. The group attacks Eggar, believing he is the killer. While Dennis is watching the rest of the group fight, the killer climbs out from the roots of the knocked over redwood tree. The killer slashes Dennis's ankle and he falls to his death. The killer rises up to scream; it is revealed that Eggar's missing, feral mother (the subject of the earlier story) is the killer. As she walks toward the group, she sets off the trap and is mortally wounded. The group watch in silent horror as Eggar's mother hangs dead in the trap.

== Cast ==
- John Friedrich as Dennis Zorich
- Adrian Zmed as Marco Cerone
- Daryl Hannah as Windy Morgan
- Mark Metcalf as Mike
- Ernest Harden Jr. as Nathaniel Hines
- Rachel Ward as Margaret
- Akosua Busia as Vanessa
- Lewis Smith as Richard Boone
- Cindy Harrell as Melanie
- Joe Pantoliano as Eggar Buelton
- Irene Sanders as Sammie
- Richard Jacobs as Mr. Morgan
- Donna Pinder as Mrs. Morgan
- Jim Youngs as Jim
- Lori Lee Butler as Lori

Eggar’s Mother is played by three different actors in the film: Joe Pantoliano, Tony Maccario, and stunt performer Jeannie Epper. Only Maccario was credited.

== Themes ==
Film scholar John Kenneth Muir notes in his book Horror Films of the 1980s that The Final Terror exemplifies a trend of slasher films boasting a "man-versus-nature" trope. Muir writes: "In the 1980s, Americans had more creature comforts, including Atari 2600s, VCRs, shopping malls, and less of a need to seek leisure outside in the woods... Ever since Jean Renoir's A Day in the Country (1936), cinema has played with the notion of nature as a foreign place... The Final Terror is no Renoir movie, yet (much like 1977's The Hills Have Eyes and, to a much lesser degree, 1983's The Prey), it explores the idea that wilderness is just that."

== Production ==
=== Development ===
After the success of such slasher films as Halloween (1978) and Friday the 13th (1980), executive producer Samuel Z. Arkoff pitched the idea of making a horror film to his friend and co-producer, Joe Roth. The project marked Arkoff's first major feature following his departure from American International Pictures.

The original screenplay, which had the working title Bump in the Night, consisted of a sparse plot about "rich boys and girls going off into the woods and getting killed." The screenplay was co-written by Ronald Shusett, who had previously co-written Alien (1979) with Dan O'Bannon.

Director Davis was recommended for the film by Shusett, who had been impressed by Davis's previous work. Davis was also hired by producer Joe Roth to serve as cinematographer, billed under the pseudonym "Andreas Davidescu" to avoid problems with the filmmakers' union. Prior to shooting, Davis and Roth scouted various locations, including the Mount St. Helens area in Washington.

=== Casting ===
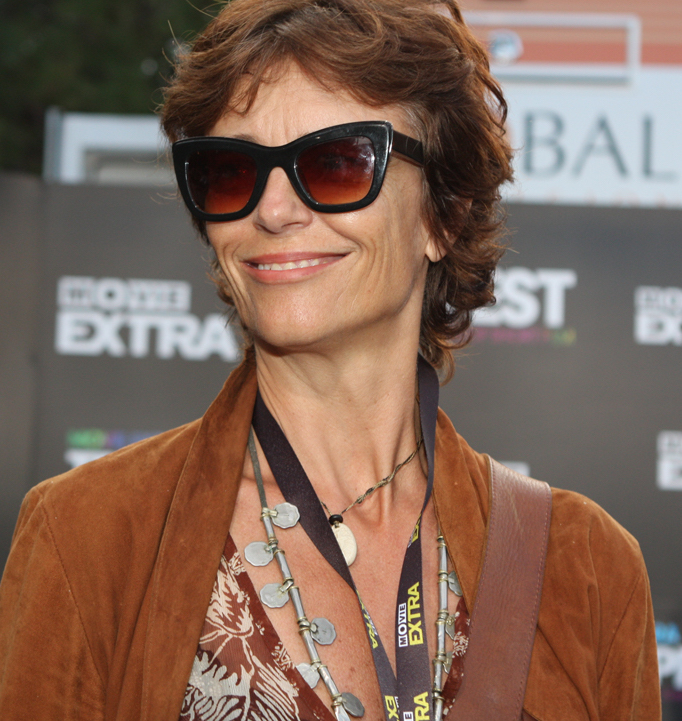
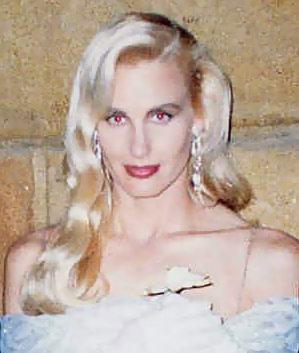
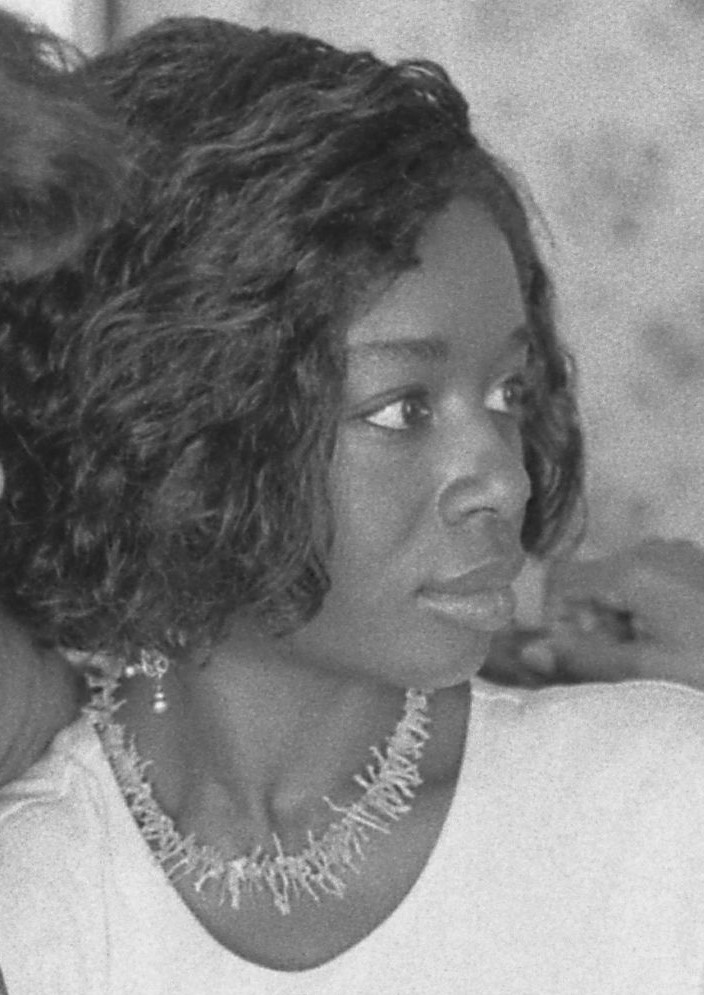
The three female leads, Rachel Ward, Daryl Hannah, and Akosua Busia, had little film experience when cast

Most of the cast of The Final Terror were inexperienced or new actors. Rachel Ward was cast in the lead role of Margaret after Davis had seen a modeling portrait of her in Roth's office. Akosua Busia auditioned during an open casting call on Hollywood Boulevard, and was cast in the supporting role of Vanessa; Busia, the daughter of Ghana Prime Minister Kofi Abrefa Busia, was a childhood friend of Ward, who became acquainted with her while they were studying in London, and neither were aware the other had been cast in the same film until the first day of shooting.

In the role of Windy, Davis cast Daryl Hannah, who, like Ward, had little film experience at the time. Davis cast Joe Pantoliano in the role of Eggar after he entered the audition in character, impressing Davis with his commitment. Donna Pinder, who portrayed Mrs. Morgan, was producer Arkoff's daughter, who later married Roth.

=== Filming ===
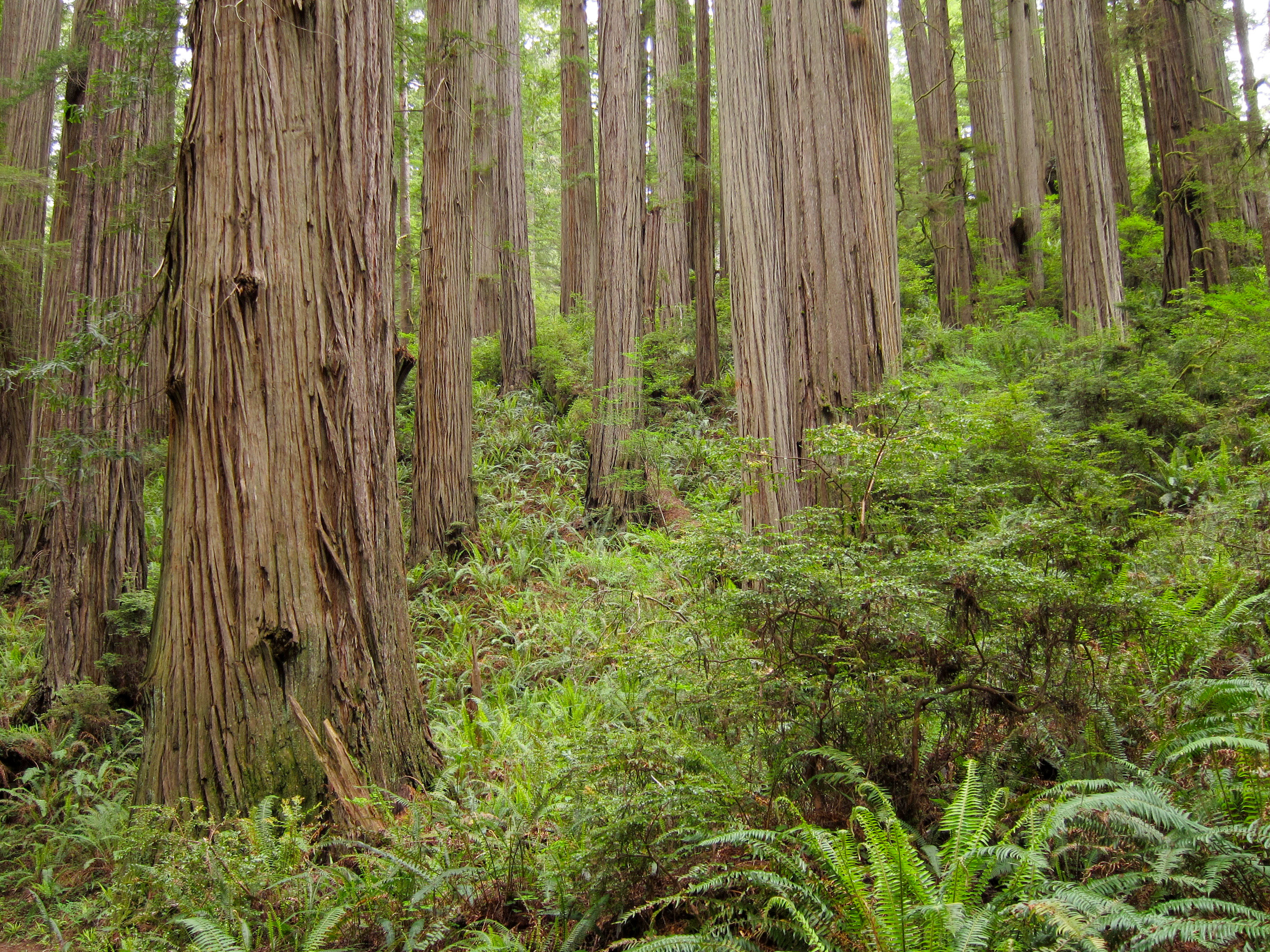
The Jedediah Smith Redwoods State Park was a central filming location

Principal photography took place largely in the Jedediah Smith Redwoods State Park, surrounding Crescent City, California, and southern Oregon in September 1981, under the working title Three Blind Mice. The accompanying crew consisted of only four people. The majority of filming was completed by Davis, though the opening sequence featuring the anonymous couple being murdered was later filmed by an editor. Some of the establishing camp sequences were filmed at the California Conservation Corps camp in northern California.

During filming, the cast and crew stayed in Crescent City and would enter through the border before filming all day in Oregon and also traveling along the Whitewater River. The filming conditions were difficult due to weather conditions, with frequent rain. One evening during the shoot, locals gave the cast marijuana brownies, which resulted in some of them being admitted to the hospital. Upon driving in one of their cars, the crew had hit a Redwood tree and Smith cited their excuse was "someone putted the tree out on the street".

According to Adrian Zmed, Davis shot an abundance of film, rolling the camera frequently; the scene with Zmed's character howling was done in an estimated 15-20 takes. Zmed mentioned that filming the sequence in which Eggar was strangling him during a fight was difficult to shoot; at the time, Zmed felt he was unable to enact being in real physical pain, so he asked stunt-woman Jeannie Epper to pull the rope tighter around his throat. The cast performed the majority of their own stunts. In the log-trap creation scene where Dennis Zorich was climbing up the tree, they used real tree-climbers and logging techniques.

== Release ==
After film was completed, it was shelved for two years until 1983 as the producers searched for a distributor. The film only had five deaths, so the beginning scene with the couple getting killed was filmed in order to have a higher chance of a distributor picking up the film. However, the scene was shot without the director's permission, so Roth had to pay a fee, some of it sourced from funds intended for Davis' wedding at the time.

In the United Kingdom, the film was released under the title Campsite Massacre in mid-1983. It was released theatrically in the United States on October 28, 1983.

At the time of its release, several of the film's stars had garnered recognition for other acting roles, including Hannah, who had had a major role in Ridley Scott's Blade Runner (1982), Ward, who made a critically acclaimed appearance in the miniseries The Thorn Birds, and Zmed, who had been cast as a regular on the network series T. J. Hooker.

=== Home media ===
The film came into home video on VHS in the mid 1980s and later had a DVD release in the 2000s. In July 2014, Shout! Factory subsidiary Scream Factory released the film in a Blu-ray/DVD combo pack, which contains the R-rated version. Accordingly, the original negative and interpositive were all lost, and Scream Factory went through six film prints lent by film collectors to deliver the best looking reels for the combo pack.

== Critical reception ==
The film received mixed reviews at the time of its release, with numerous critics drawing comparisons to Deliverance (1972) and Friday the 13th (1980), due to the film's slasher elements set against a survivalist narrative.

Kevin Thomas of the Los Angeles Times noted that the film does not contain "much of a story," though conceded that "Davis has managed to turn out a competent, though scarcely compelling, film with believable people. Although not for the faint of heart, The Final Terror avoids lingering morbidly over its bloodshed, and at least is not yet another exploitation of extreme violence against women." Writing for The Baltimore Sun, Stephen Hunter faulted the film as it "never builds any real tension or energy, even within the limited confines of the genre... Although the kids... are handsome enough, they never develop any personalities." Hunter did note, however, that the film's "production values are unusually high." The Palm Beach Post's Kathryn Buxton praised the film's setting and "likewise scenic cast" but added: "After her throat is cut by the slasher, Ms. Hanna is sewn miraculously back together by Ms. Ward, and she is up and walking in no time. Like that scene there is little sense, or tension, in The Final Terror."

Terry Lawson of the Dayton Journal Herald criticized the film's plot for being derivative, adding that both Ward and Hannah "do their jobs, which is to look beautiful even when scared out of their makeup. The only real performance in the film is rendered by John Friedrich, who does a Robert De Niro imitation that is so blatantly bad that one can only hope he intended it as parody." Mike Hughes in the Lansing State Journal, was also critical, writing: "Davis seems to think he's doing a Bergman drama. He fills Terror with overlapping dialogue, mumbled lines, meandering cameras. Unfortunately, this is no high-class drama... Despite the arty efforts, Final Terror emerges as a movie only James Watt could love. It shows forests aren't that much fun after all." In their capsule review, the Shreveport Times deemed the film "another vehicle in the current horror genre with a newcomer cast and not much else." Writing for the Gannett News Service, Mike Hughes denounced the film as "cheap and bad, without trying to be... The cast is filled with good people who got better roles while this film was waiting on the shelf."

On the internet review aggregator Rotten Tomatoes, the film holds a 33% approval rating with an average rating of 4.29/10 based on 9 reviews. AllMovie gave a 2.5 rating, citing the film as "mediocre" and recommending "worth watching more for its cast than for its clichéd story".

== Sources ==
- Craig, Rob (2019). American International Pictures: A Comprehensive Filmography. Jefferson, North Carolina: McFarland. ISBN 978-1-476-66631-0.
- Davis, Andrew (2014). The Final Terror (Blu-ray audio commentary). Scream Factory.
- Harper, Jim (2004). Legacy of Blood: A Comprehensive Guide to Slasher Movies. Manchester: Critical Vision. ISBN 978-1-900-48639-2.
- Muir, John Kenneth (2010). Horror Films of the 1980s. Jefferson, North Carolina: McFarland. ISBN 978-0-786-45501-0.
