= Lush Life (novel) =

2008 novel by Richard Price

- First hardcover edition
- Author: Richard Price
- Language: English
- Genre: Social novel
- Publisher: Farrar, Straus and Giroux
- Publication date: March 4, 2008
- Publication place: United States
- Media type: Print (hardcover and paperback)
- Pages: 464 pp
- ISBN: 0-374-29925-0
- OCLC: 123767285
- Dewey Decimal: 813/.54 22
- LC Class: PS3566.R544 L89 2008
- Preceded by: Samaritan

Lush Life is a social novel by American writer Richard Price. Price's eighth novel, it was published in 2008 by Farrar, Straus and Giroux.

== Plot summary ==
The book is set on the Lower East Side of Manhattan, and begins with a crime that at first seems straightforward, but quickly expands into a thicket of complications. On the way home from a night of drinking, three men—cafe manager Eric Cash, bartender Ike Marcus, and a friend of Marcus'—are accosted by two muggers. Marcus is shot and killed, in a manner echoing the real-life murder of Nicole duFresne. NYPD Detective Matty Clark winds up investigating the crime, and keeping an eye on Ike's distraught father Billy, whose behavior becomes increasingly erratic. Cash is initially arrested for the crime, but later released when the accounts of other witnesses back up his own; his own behavior is affected as he has difficulty coping with the memory of the incident and the stresses of the police interrogation. Interwoven with the main plot are vignettes of the Lower East Side and the waves of immigrants that have come through there and lived in its tenements over the years.

== Reception ==
The novel received mostly rave reviews from a wide variety of media sources. Michiko Kakutani of The New York Times wrote that Lush Life was "a visceral, heart-thumping portrait of New York City" and "no one writes better dialogue than Richard Price—not Elmore Leonard, not David Mamet, not even David Chase." The Hartford Courant praised Price's ability to "embrace irony without ever being ham-handed and to create characters who refuse to be pinned down". Others called it "powerful" and a "damned good book", and said that "every sentence is a pleasure".

Salon writer Richard B. Woodward called the book "astonishing", but "more a collection of brilliantly realistic scenes than a book with moral weight or a convincing vision of the way New York functions in the Bloomberg era". The Los Angeles Times praised it as "deftly written" and "beautifully expressive", but thought that "Price can't quite bridge the gap between this social novel and the subtleties of real life".

Lush Life was a finalist for both the Los Angeles Times Book Prize and the PEN/Faulkner Award for Fiction.

The novel gained further attention when it was revealed that U.S. President Barack Obama would be reading it during his 2009 summer vacation.
