= Sea of Love (film) =

1989 film directed by Harold Becker

- Theatrical release poster
- Directed by: Harold Becker
- Written by: Richard Price
- Based on: Ladies' Man by Richard Price
- Produced by: Martin Bregman; Louis A. Stroller
- Starring: Al Pacino; Ellen Barkin; John Goodman
- Cinematography: Ronnie Taylor
- Edited by: David Bretherton
- Music by: Trevor Jones
- Distributed by: Universal Pictures
- Release date: September 15, 1989
- Running time: 114 minutes
- Country: United States
- Language: English
- Budget: $19 million
- Box office: $110.9 million

Sea of Love is a 1989 American neo-noir romantic thriller film directed by Harold Becker, written by Richard Price, and starring Al Pacino, Ellen Barkin and John Goodman. The story concerns a New York City detective (Pacino) trying to catch a serial killer who finds victims through the singles column in a newspaper.

The film is inspired by Price's 1978 novel Ladies' Man, though it does not credit the novel as source material. It was Pacino's first film after a four-year hiatus following the critical and commercial failure of Revolution. Sea of Love received generally positive reviews and was a box-office success, grossing more than $110 million. Pacino's performance earned him a Golden Globe nomination for Best Actor in a Motion Picture – Drama.

== Plot ==
New York City homicide detective Frank Keller is a burned-out alcoholic. His wife left him and married one of his colleagues, and he is depressed about reaching his twentieth year on the police force. He is assigned to investigate the murder of a man in Manhattan who has been shot while face down in his bed, naked, and listening to an old 45 rpm record of the 1959 hit "Sea of Love". Keller has three clues: a lipstick-smeared cigarette, a want ad that the dead man placed in a newspaper, and fingerprints of the perpetrator.

A second man dies in the same manner in Queens. Detective Sherman Touhey from the local precinct suggests that he and Frank collaborate. Both victims had placed rhyming ads in the lonely-hearts column of the newspaper, seeking dates. The detectives track down Raymond Brown, the only other man with a rhyming ad. He is a married man who admits placing the ad but swears that he threw away all the letters and never saw anyone.

Frank intends to place a rhyming ad in the paper, meet women who respond in a restaurant, and take the prints from their drinking glasses. Frank's precinct chief is skeptical but reconsiders when Brown turns up dead in the same manner as the other two murder victims. Frank has dinner with several women, while Sherman, posing as a waiter, puts their glasses into evidence bags. One woman, divorcée Helen Cruger, shows no interest in Frank and leaves without taking a drink, so Frank is unable to get her fingerprints. Frank bumps into her again at a supermarket, but this time, she is more friendly. Helen manages a chic upscale shoe store, but Frank does not reveal his true occupation.

Frank and Helen go to his place against his better judgment and a warning from Sherman. They become passionate, but Frank panics when he finds a gun in her purse. Helen explains that she keeps the starting pistol because she has been frightened lately. Frank apologizes, and they have sex. The couple begin a romance. He has a chance to obtain Helen's fingerprints on a glass but chooses to wipe the glass clean. Their relationship becomes strained when she discovers that he is a police officer. One night, when he is drunk, he almost tells Helen that they were involved in a sting. He starts to confess his feelings for her, but discovers that she responded to each of the victims' ads. When he confronts her, Helen refuses to admit to anything. He tells her to leave.

Moments later, the real killer bursts into the apartment: Helen's ex-husband Terry, who has been stalking Helen and killing the men she dates. At gunpoint, he makes Frank lie on his bed and show how he made love to Helen as he had done to his other victims before murdering them. Frank manages to overpower Terry and tries to call the police, but Terry lunges at him and, in the ensuing struggle, Terry is thrown through the bedroom window to his death.

Several weeks later, a newly sober Frank meets Sherman in a bar and reunites with Helen. She forgives him, and they resume their relationship.

== Cast ==
- Al Pacino as Detective Frank Keller
- Ellen Barkin as Helen Cruger
- John Goodman as Detective Sherman Touhey
- Michael Rooker as Terry Cruger
- William Hickey as Frank Keller Sr.
- Richard Jenkins as Detective Gruber
- John Spencer as Lieutenant Longo
- Michael O'Neill as Raymond Brown
- Paul Calderón as Serafino
- Gene Canfield as Struk
- Larry Joshua as Dargan
- Christine Estabrook as Gina Gallagher
- Barbara Baxley as Miss Allen
- Patricia Barry as Older Woman
- Luis Ramos as Omar Maldonado
- Rafael Báez as Efram Maldonado
- Damien Leake as Ernest Lee
- Jacqueline Brookes as Helen's Mother
- Brian Paul as James Mackey
- Nancy Beatty as Mrs. Brown
- Ferne Downey as Sasha
- Hugh Thompson as Young Cop
- Christopher Maleki as Detective (uncredited)

Samuel L. Jackson played a minor role as one of the men arrested in the opening sting operation.

== Production ==
=== Writing ===
The film is a loosely based on Richard Price's novel Ladies' Man. The novel shares only a similar main idea, while having different characters, a different plot and a different theme. Price later said that he wanted to explore the same idea as Ladies' Man, but that he wanted to make the protagonist cooler to an audience (by making him a police officer and giving him a gun).

The opening scene of the film, in which the NYPD conducts a sting operation via a fake New York Yankees sweepstakes event, was based on Operation Flagship. The scene reportedly inspired a similar operation in Sheffield, England in 1995, which led to the apprehension of some 31 suspects.

=== Casting ===
Dustin Hoffman was originally in negotiations to star before Pacino became interested in the project.

Lorraine Bracco filmed scenes as Keller's ex-wife Denise, which were cut from the theatrical release print, but were restored for television versions.

=== Filming ===
Filming began on May 23, 1988, in Toronto, Canada, where interiors were filmed at the Masonic Temple Hall, the Horseshoe Tavern, and a disused former police station, among other locations. Sets were built at Toronto International Studios in Kleinburg. Production moved to New York City on July 26, where location exteriors and interiors were shot. The opening sting sequence was shot at the Savoy Ballroom. Filming lasted a total of 19 weeks.

In a 2023 interview with HuffPo, Ellen Barkin claimed that during the making of this film, director Harold Becker allegedly ripped off her merkin during the filming of a nude scene.

== Reception ==
=== Box office ===
Sea of Love grossed $58.5 million domestically and $52.3 million overseas, for a total of $110.9 million worldwide. The film made $10 million in its opening weekend, topping the box office and setting the record for best debut for a fall release. In its second week, it had a 22% drop, grossing $7.8 million and finishing second.

=== Critical response ===
Rotten Tomatoes reports that 76% of 33 critics have given the film a positive review, with an average rating of 6.80/10. The website's critics consensus reads: "Moody and steadily alluring, Sea of Love benefits immeasurably from the window-fogging chemistry between Ellen Barkin and Al Pacino." On Metacritic, the film has a weighted average score of 66 out of 100, based on 18 critics, indicating "generally favorable" reviews. Audiences polled by CinemaScore gave the film an average grade of "A−" on a scale of A+ to F.

In his review in the Los Angeles Times, Kevin Thomas called it "a slick, knowing genre film, through and through, a New York cop suspense thriller that we've seen countless times before", but stated that "it can't quite keep us away from wondering how a smart woman like Helen, whose looks would stop traffic and whose work would bring her into constant contact with an array of sophisticated men, would ever resort to the personals - unless, of course, she really is a psychopath."

The review in Variety praised the film, calling it "a suspenseful film noir boasting a superlative performance by Al Pacino as a burned-out Gotham cop".

Hal Hinson for The Washington Post stated that if the film "were able to get it all, it would be a great movie. As it is, it's stirring and messy and hints at more than it is capable of delivering."

Roger Ebert of the Chicago Sun-Times gave the film three stars out of four, praised the acting of Al Pacino and Ellen Barkin, but thought that "the ending...cheats by bringing in a character from left field at the last moment. Part of the fun in a movie like this is guessing the identity of the killer, and part of the problem...is that the audience is not fairly treated. Technically, I suppose, the plot can be justified. But I felt cheated. I had good feelings for the characters and their relationships, but I walked out feeling the plot played fast and loose with the rules of whodunits."

=== Awards and nominations ===
Institution	Year	Category	Nominee	Result
Chicago Film Critics Association	1990	Best Actress	Ellen Barkin	Nominated
Chicago Film Critics Association	1990	Best Supporting Actor	John Goodman	Nominated
Edgar Awards	1990	Best Motion Picture Screenplay	Richard Price	Nominated
Golden Globes	1990	Best Actor in a Motion Picture – Drama	Al Pacino	Nominated
Jupiter Awards	1990	Best International Actress	Ellen Barkin	Nominated
