= The Wanderers (1979 film) =

1979 film directed by Philip Kaufman

- Theatrical release poster
- Directed by: Philip Kaufman
- Screenplay by: Rose Kaufman; Philip Kaufman
- Based on: The Wanderers by Richard Price
- Produced by: Martin Ransohoff
- Starring: Ken Wahl; John Friedrich; Karen Allen; Toni Kalem
- Cinematography: Michael Chapman
- Edited by: Stuart H. Pappé; Ronald Roose
- Production companies: Orion Pictures; Film Finance Group
- Distributed by: Orion Pictures (thru Warner Bros.)
- Release date: July 4, 1979
- Running time: 117 minutes
- Country: United States
- Language: English
- Budget: $4–5 million
- Box office: $23 million

The Wanderers is a 1979 American drama film co-written and directed by Philip Kaufman and starring Ken Wahl, John Friedrich, Karen Allen, Toni Kalem, Tony Ganios and Jim Youngs. Set in the Bronx in 1963, the film follows a gang of Italian-American teenagers known as the Wanderers and their ongoing power struggles with rival gangs such as the Baldies and the Wongs.

The film is based on the novel of the same name by Richard Price; its screenplay was written by Philip Kaufman and his wife Rose. The film had a troubled development stage: after unsuccessfully trying to obtain financing for The Wanderers from Alberto Grimaldi, Kaufman directed other films. After filming the remake of Invasion of the Body Snatchers, Kaufman went to New York City and successfully pitched The Wanderers to Martin Ransohoff. The film's budget is unknown, but Kaufman said it was relatively low.

After an advance screening, The Wanderers premiered on July 13, 1979, to mostly positive reviews. The film was a financial success, grossing $23 million at the worldwide box office.

The film's increasing popularity and cult status led to The Wanderers being given a theatrical re-release in the U.S. by Warner Bros. in 1996. According to Kaufman, "it took a long time for [the film] to find [an] audience".

== Plot ==
Joey and Turkey are members of the Wanderers, an Italian-American greaser street gang living in the Bronx. Joey tries to dissuade Turkey from joining a rival gang, the Fordham Baldies. Before Turkey can ask, Terror's girlfriend Peewee overhears Joey insulting the Baldies, calling them a "bunch of pricks with ears". Joey and Turkey flee and the Baldies chase them. Richie—the leader of the Wanderers—and Buddy come to help but they also flee from the Baldies. After being cornered, the Wanderers are helped by a tough stranger named Perry, who has recently moved to the Bronx from New Jersey. After much persuasion, Perry joins the Wanderers.

In school, the Wanderers get into a racial dispute with another gang, the Del Bombers, who are all African-American. Both gangs agree to settle their dispute, seemingly a street fight, but the Wanderers struggle to find a gang willing to back them. With no other options, Richie asks his girlfriend's father, alleged local mafia boss Chubby Galasso, who agrees to help solve the gangs' dispute.

During a game of "elbow-tit", Richie gropes a woman called Nina. He feels ashamed of himself, apologizes for his actions and persuades Nina to accept Joey's telephone number. The Wanderers then decide to follow Nina in Perry's car.

After Perry becomes lost, the Wanderers are attacked by an all-Irish-American street gang called the Ducky Boys. They escape after Perry's arm is broken.

While drunk, the Baldies are tricked into joining the Marines. Before reporting for training, they decide to crash Despie's party, where Turkey—who has recently joined the Baldies—is told to draw the Wanderers outside. After drawing them out, Turkey realizes the Baldies have abandoned him. He tries to chase them but fails. Upset, Turkey visits a nearby Catholic church. After being spotted by a member of the Ducky Boys attending Mass, Turkey is chased down the street. After climbing a fire escape ladder in an attempt to escape, he falls to his death.

In school, while the Wanderers are mourning Turkey's death, the rest of the gang oust Richie for sleeping with Joey's date Nina. After the assassination of President John F. Kennedy, Richie rekindles his relationship with Despie. When Chubby discovers his daughter is pregnant, he forces Richie into marrying her.

The Wanderers and the Del Bombers decide to settle their dispute not with a street fight but with a football game organized by Chubby. Richie uses the opportunity to make amends with Joey. A member of the Ducky Boys interrupts the game, as the Wanderers momentarily turn their heads, hundreds of Ducky Boys invade the field. Many of the Wanderers and the Del Bombers flee, but some stand their ground. The remaining players join forces with spectator gangs in the stands, including one called the Wongs and even Emilio. After a long and bloody battle, the Ducky Boys flee.

After being physically abused by his father Emilio, Joey decides to spend the night at Perry's apartment. Perry tells Joey he is planning to leave the Bronx and move to California. Joey asks Perry if he can go with him; after an initially skeptical response, Perry agrees. Emilio, drunk, enters Perry's apartment and fights with him; Joey knocks Emilio unconscious with a glass bottle. Joey and Perry quickly leave the apartment and head to Richie's engagement party. At the party Richie notices Nina walking by and quickly follows. Before he catches up to her, she walks into a bar where Bob Dylan is performing "The Times They Are a-Changin'". Accepting that their relationship is over, he makes his way back to the party.

Upon his return, Joey and Perry say an emotional goodbye to Richie, and when they leave, Richie realizes things will not be the same. At Richie's party, members of the Wanderers, the Del Bombers and the Wongs embrace one another while singing "The Wanderer". The movie ends with Joey and Perry traveling to California.

== Cast ==
- Ken Wahl as Richie Gennaro, the leader of the Wanderers.
- John Friedrich as Joey Capra, Richie's closest friend and a fellow Wanderer.
- Karen Allen as Nina Becker, Richie's love interest.
- Toni Kalem as Despie Galasso, Richie's girlfriend and Chubby Galasso's daughter.
- Tony Ganios as Perry LaGuardia, a member of the Wanderers and a close friend of Joey.
- Jim Youngs as Buddy Borsalino, a leading member of the Wanderers.
- Alan Rosenberg as "Turkey", a member of the Wanderers who wants to join the Fordham Baldies.
- Dolph Sweet as "Chubby" Galasso, the local mafia boss and father of Despie Galasso.
- William Andrews as Emilio Capra, Joey's father.
- Erland van Lidth as "Terror", the leader of the Fordham Baldies.
- Linda Manz as "Peewee", Terror's girlfriend.
- Michael Wright as Clinton Stitch, the leader of the Del Bombers.
- Samm-Art Williams as Roger, the only black member of the Fordham Baldies and the cousin of Clinton Stitch.
- Val Avery as Mr. Sharp, a high school teacher.
- Dion Albanese as Teddy Wong, the leader of the Wongs.

Additional actors include Olympia Dukakis as Joey's Mother, the novel's author Richard Price as a Hustler, Wayne Knight (in his film debut) as a Waiter, and Faith Minton as The Big Lady.

== Production ==
=== Development ===
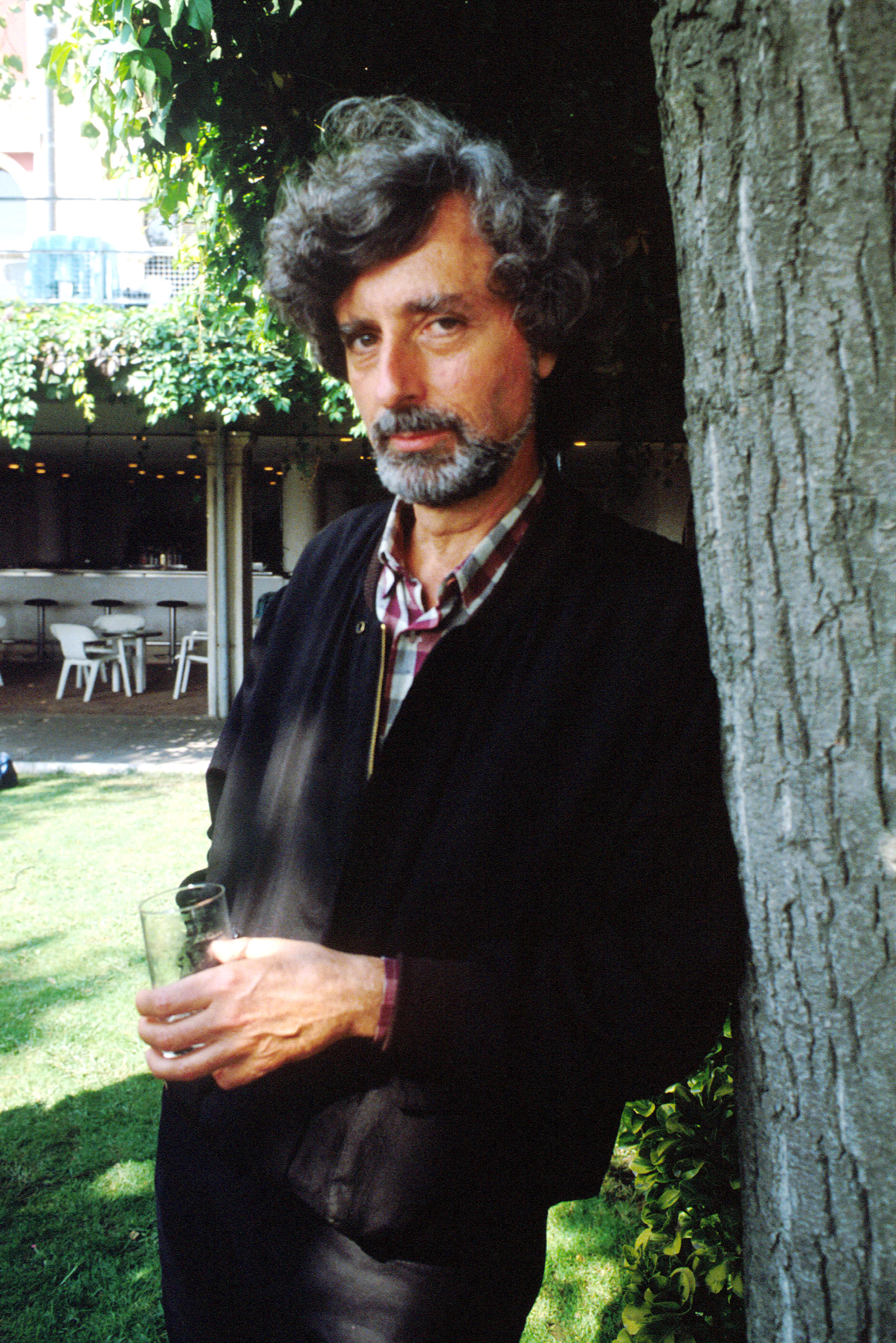
Philip Kaufman at the 48th Venice International Film Festival

Philip Kaufman and Richard Price unsuccessfully tried to pitch the project to Alberto Grimaldi. Because of this, Kaufman signed on to direct what would have been the first motion picture based on Star Trek: The Original Series, to be called Star Trek: Planet of the Titans. Allan Scott and Chris Bryant were hired to write the film's screenplay, but their attempt was rejected and Kaufman tried to write the screenplay himself. Before he could finish the screenplay, Paramount Pictures abandoned the project, saying there was no market for science-fiction movies. After the Star Trek project was shelved, Kaufman directed the remake of Invasion of the Body Snatchers. When filming finished, he went to New York and successfully pitched The Wanderers to Martin Ransohoff. According to Kaufman, "the pieces somehow fell together", partly because of the increasing popularity of gang movies.

=== Writing ===
Kaufman's wife Rose wrote the screenplay's first draft. It took her several years to complete: she found adapting the entire novel difficult. Some of the characters and stories from the novel were either changed or given retroactive continuity. Despite the differences, Richard Price approved of Kaufman's adaptation, saying, "I love that picture. It's not my book, and I don't care. The spirit is right, and the way Phil Kaufman directed it showed me another way of looking at my own book."

=== Casting ===
The casting process, which Kaufman described as "arduous", began in New York City. He said teenagers from across the city wanted to audition. Academy Award-winning producer Scott Rudin was the film's casting director who found Erland van Lidth and Linda Manz. There was no character named Peewee in the novel. Rudin had organized an interview with Manz. Kaufman and Price were present; they all thought she had "great character". Manz was so convincing that everyone assumed she was a real member of a street gang. Because of this, the character Peewee was specifically written for her.

Many of the film's actors were unknown at the time of casting. The film was the acting debut of four cast members; Ken Wahl, Tony Ganios, Erland van Lidth and Michael Wright. It was also the feature film debut of Toni Kalem, who had previously acted on television. Kaufman intentionally cast unknown actors; someone sent a photograph of Wahl on his way to his job in a pizza parlor to Rudin, thinking he could play one of the smaller roles in the film. Kaufman felt Wahl was talented, so he cast him in the lead role, instead.

To cast the role of Perry LaGuardia, Kaufman telephoned every gymnasium around New York asking for a "six-foot, four inch, 18 year-old kid". He was put into contact with Ganios, whom he cast in the role. Ganios said:

After a mysterious phone call, [my uncle] politely asked me to stop training and get dressed. He 'insisted' that I accompany him downtown to what was supposed to be a commercial audition, [but it later] turned out to be an interview for The Wanderers. I thought acting was for sissies, but I went anyway.

=== Filming ===
Filming of The Wanderers began in September 1978, most of it taking place in The Bronx. Kaufman said that during filming, "[This] Puerto Rican motorcycle gang came pushing its way through the crowd; wanting to see what was going on", and "they pushed everyone aside". They walked away after bumping into van Lidth. The crew also encountered trouble from former members of the "real" Baldies, who complained the film portrayed the Baldies incorrectly, saying: "[The movie] is a lie! This was not a bad neighborhood. There was no crime, no robbery. Murder, yes, but no crime!" Rose Kaufman eventually told them to "fuck off", which nearly resulted in a brawl between the former gang members, Wahl and several other actors.

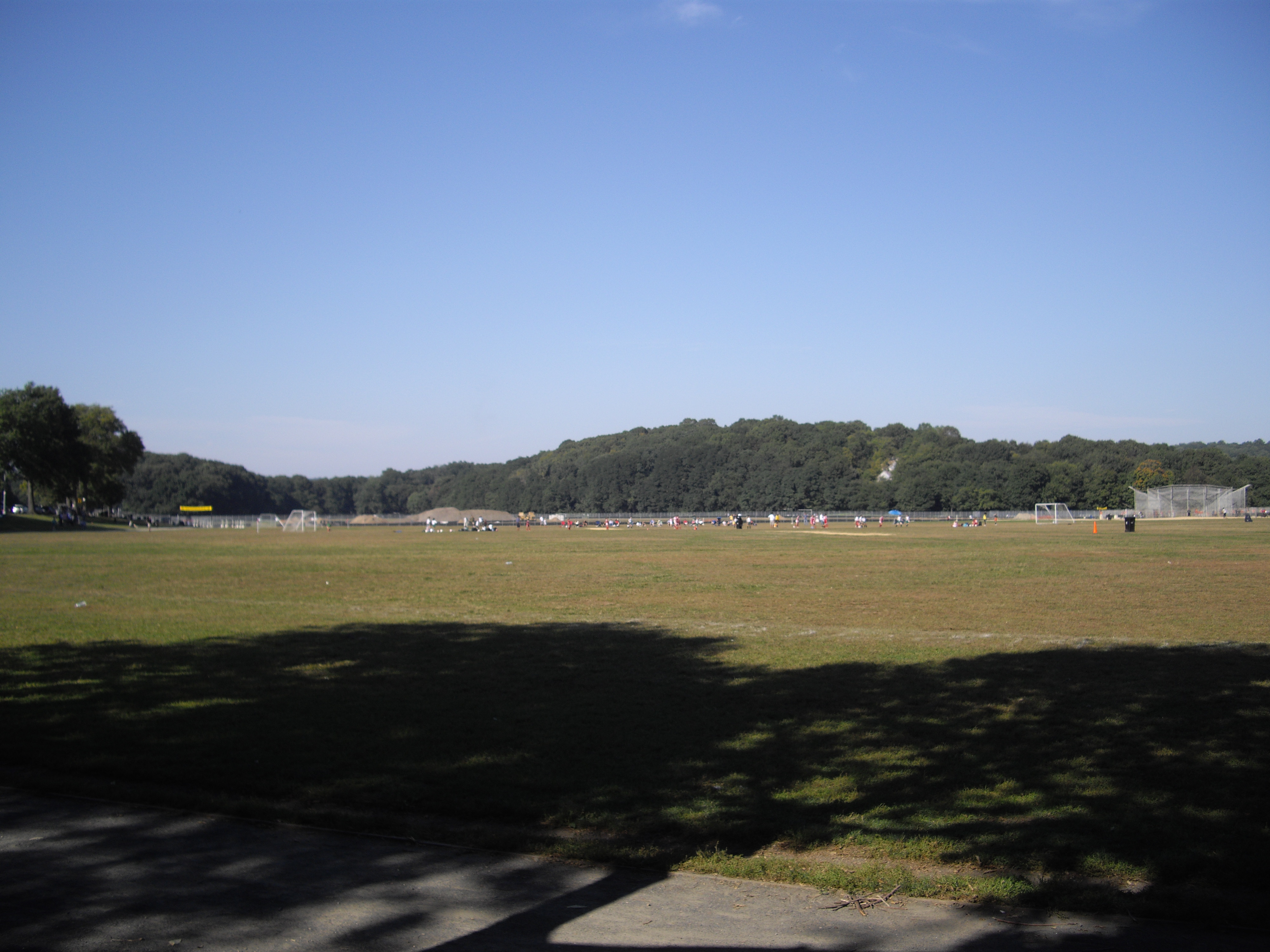
Van Cortlandt Park in September 2008

The final battle with the Ducky Boys, which takes place during a football game, was filmed in Van Cortlandt Park. Kaufman compared this scene to a "brutal British soccer brawl"; Ganios compared it to the Battle of Mons Graupius. When asked further about this scene, Ganios said:

The final fight with the Ducky Boys was absolutely wild, [and] for all practical purposes it was real. For an entire week hundreds of screaming, stunted madmen—armed with real baseball bats, axe handles, and chains—hurled themselves at us in wave after wave of unabated Celtic fury. It got totally out of hand, with the mayhem sometimes continuing for a full five minutes after [the director] yelled cut. Some of the actors and camera crew were seriously injured and had to be hospitalized.

=== Editing ===
During editing, Kaufman removed six minutes of footage from the film.

== Release ==
The Wanderers was released theatrically in New York on July 13, 1979, by Warner Bros. and throughout the United States in July and August. Kaufman said the film initially had a "very small, limited" release. The director's cut premiered at the Telluride Film Festival in 1995. This was followed by a 1996 theatrical re-release in the U.S. due to the film's popularity. In 2012, the director's cut of The Wanderers was screened to the Film Society at the Lincoln Center for the Performing Arts. Both versions of the film were released in 2017 by Kino Lorber under license from the film's producers, who own its rights.

=== Critical reception ===
The film's initial reception was mixed. After an advanced screening on December 31, 1978, Variety praised it, saying that "despite" the "uneasy blend of nostalgia and violence", The Wanderers "is a well-made and impressive film". The Kaufmans were also complimented for their script, which was described as "accurately" capturing the "urban angst" of growing up in the early 1960s. Janet Maslin of The New York Times criticized the film in her 1979 review, saying "the movie never attempts to tell a single story" and instead "settles for a string of boisterous vignettes, which are heaped carelessly atop one another without any consistent scheme".

A number of critics praised the film, including Peter Stack of the San Francisco Chronicle, after its 1996 theatrical re-release. Stack noted Kaufman's talent for effectively changing the film's tone and praised the acting abilities of Wahl and Ganios. He also complimented the film's soundtrack.

The film has an approval rating of 89% on Rotten Tomatoes based on 19 reviews, with an average rating of 6.8/10. Time Out praised the film, saying it "deliver[s] some great, gross, comic book capers; and rock history gets its most intelligent illustration since Mean Streets".

=== Box office performance ===
The Wanderers made $5 million at the U.S. box office and $18 million overseas, for a worldwide gross of $23 million. When asked about the financial success, Kaufman said the film had done "very well".

=== Legacy ===
Since its initial release, The Wanderers has gained a significant cult following. In 1988, Danny Peary said the film's "sensitive depiction" of teenagers coming-of-age was partly responsible for its cult status. Placing The Wanderers seventh in his list of "lesser-known" cult films, Neil Evans describing the film as a "lost masterpiece". Another writer described the film as a "near masterpiece" and called it "one of the best coming-of-age [films] ever made". On the film's popularity and cult status, Kaufman said:

It took a long time for [the film] to find [an] audience. It's great to see that now—however many years later—[that] it went to a brief re-release by Warner Bros. [in 1996] because of the cult following. Bravo says it's the most popular film they've shown in the New York area. [The film was also shown] at the Telluride Film Festival. All [of] the people who run the festival are members of The Wanderers fan club, all wear Wanderers jackets, and [they] know every line in the film. They show the film at least twice a year up there [in Colorado]. There were about 1000 people outside, under the mountains and watching the film. It was a great night.

== Soundtrack ==
The Wanderers: Original Motion Picture Soundtrack

Soundtrack album by Various artists
- Released: April 12, 1989
- Recorded: 1959–1964
- Length: 30:51
- Label: Warner Bros. Records

Professional ratings
Review scores
Source	Rating
AllMusic	3/5 stars

Kaufman and Price compiled the soundtrack themselves. The film features Bob Dylan performing "The Times They Are a-Changin'", but the song was not included on the soundtrack album.

The Wanderers: Original Motion Picture Soundtrack
No.	Title	Music	Writer(s)	Length
1.	"Walk Like a Man"	Performed by the Four Seasons	Bob Crewe and Bob Gaudio	2:17
2.	"Ya Ya"	Performed by Lee Dorsey	Lee Dorsey, Clarence Lewis, Morgan Robinson and Morris Levy	1:57
3.	"Big Girls Don't Cry"	Performed by the Four Seasons	Bob Crewe and Bob Gaudio	2:28
4.	"My Boyfriend's Back"	Performed by the Angels	Bob Feldman, Jerry Goldstein and Richard Gottehrer	2:41
5.	"Sherry"	Performed by the Four Seasons	Bob Gaudio	2:33
6.	"Baby It's You"	Performed by the Shirelles	Burt Bacharach, Mack David and Luther Dixon	2:44
7.	"Soldier Boy"	Performed by the Shirelles	Luther Dixon and Florence Greenberg	2:43
8.	"Stand by Me"	Performed by Ben E. King	Ben E. King, Jerry Leiber and Mike Stoller	2:54
9.	"Shout"	Performed by the Isley Brothers	Rudolph Isley, Ronald Isley and O'Kelly Isley, Jr.	2:17
10.	"Do You Love Me"	Performed by the Contours	Berry Gordy, Jr.	2:55
11.	"Runaround Sue"	Performed by Dion	Dion and Ernie Maresca	2:40
12.	"The Wanderer"	Performed by Dion	Ernie Maresca	2:42
Total length:				30:51

== Bibliography ==
- Peary, Danny (1989). Cult Movies III: 50 More Hits of the Reel Thing. United Kingdom: Sidgwick & Jackson. ISBN 0-6716-4810-1.
