= Samaritan (novel) =

Novel by Richard Price (writer)

- First edition
- Author: Richard Price
- Language: English
- Publisher: Knopf
- Publication date: 2003
- Publication place: United States
- Pages: 400
- ISBN: 0-375-41115-1
- Preceded by: Freedomland
- Followed by: Lush Life

Samaritan is a novel by Richard Price, first published in 2003. It tells the story of a wealthy screenwriter who returns to his impoverished neighborhood in Dempsey, New Jersey, where he begins to help others. His motivations and their ramifications are explored. Throughout the novel, various characters help others, with each good deed having different repercussions. The hardcover artwork was later reused for the album Wallflowers: Collected 1996-2005.

== Plot summary ==
The novel takes place in the fictional city of Dempsey. As the novel opens, Ray Mitchell is lying in a hospital, having been attacked and gravely injured. He refuses to press charges, but an old friend, Nerese Ammons, learns of the incident and decides to investigate. The novel then alternates between scenes of the events leading up to the attack, and Nerese's investigations. Ray volunteers as a writing teacher at his old high school, where he seeks to help the students. Prior to the attack, Ray was trying to reconnect with his estranged daughter, Ruby. Attempting to impress his daughter, he gives a large donation to a friend, Carla Powell, for her son's funeral. However, his daughter senses the real reason for his generosity, and Carla is humiliated by the gift. And Carla's daughter, Danielle, also seems to see through him.

Ray ends up dating Danielle. Ray realizes Danielle is just using him to make her husband jealous, but does not end the relationship. Selim, a troubled former student, manipulates Ray into funding his dubious schemes. Ray ends things with Danielle after her husband, Freddy Martin, about to get out of jail, threatens Ray. Ray refuses to spend further time with Danielle's son, Nelson.

Finally, in her investigations, Nerese is able to interview Nelson Martin. She feels that Freddy Martin was the attacker, and that if she questions Nelson the right way, he will reveal crucial information to rat his father out. However, unexpectedly, in the interview she learns that the attack was carried out by Nelson himself, because he was angry that Ray had deserted him.

Ray decides to move back to LA. However, something that happens during one of his classes changes his mind, and he decides to stay. Ray receives one final visit from Selim, but Ray rejects him, upsetting Selim. Ray realizes that his desire to help has narcissistic impulses. An ugly confrontation ensues and Selim leaves, whereupon he tries to mug a cab driver but is caught by police. He calls Ray to ask for bail, and Ray bails him out for $2500. Afterwards, Selim tells Ray that if he only had given him the $1000 he wanted the night before, he could have saved $1500 by not needing bail.

== Characters ==
- Ray Mitchell - A 43-year-old Jewish man who grew up in the Dempsey housing projects. Following years as a cocaine addict taxi driver and high school English teacher, Ray hit it big in Hollywood as a TV writer. He abruptly left that life and moved back to New Jersey, where he lives off his earnings and tries to forge a relationship with his daughter while also playing at being a good samaritan.
- Ruby Mitchell - Ray's young teen daughter who he is trying to forge a relationship with after being a bad father for a number of years
- Nerese Ammons - Ray's childhood acquaintance who he once helped greatly, she is now a 41-year-old black Dempsey police officer soon to retire
- Carla Powell - She grew up in the Dempsey housing projects and still lives there in her late 40s; Danielle is her only daughter
- Danielle Powell Martin - the 31-year-old, beautiful daughter of Carla, she works hard to make something better of her life; she is married to Freddy Martin, a drug dealer
- Frederick "Freddy" Martin - a college graduate, drug dealer, and police informant who is in and out of prison, Freddy is extremely intelligent, crafty, and dangerous.
- Nelson Martin - Carla and Freddy's only child, a 12-year-old, bookish, sensitive boy who is neglected by his father and treated brusquely by his mother
- Selim Alamein - A former student of Ray's
- "White Tom" Potenza - A former drug addict who now helps others get clean.

== Reception ==
A reviewer for The New York Times wrote that the novel was "gripping but oddly hollow".
