= Ladies' Man (novel) =

Book by Richard Price

- First edition
- Author: Richard Price
- Language: English
- Genre: Fiction
- Published: 1978
- Publisher: Houghton Mifflin
- Publication place: United States

Ladies' Man is the third novel by Richard Price published in 1978. It was adapted into a 1989 film Sea of Love.

== Overview ==
Kenny Becker, a young door-to-door salesman, goes on the prowl for love in 1970s New York City.

== Critical reception ==
Kirkus Reviews wrote that "what keeps this book afloat long past its torpedoing point is Price's Lenny Bruce-ish, shpritz-style riffery." New York called Ladies' Man "more of a cult book, as it lacks the emotional range and complexity of [Price's] first two novels."
