= Freedomland (novel) =

1998 mystery novel by Richard Price

- First edition book cover
- Author: Richard Price
- Language: English
- Genre: Mystery
- Publisher: Broadway Books
- Publication date: 1 June 1998
- Publication place: United States
- Media type: Print (hardcover)
- Pages: 546 pp
- ISBN: 0-7679-0024-3
- OCLC: 38304507
- Dewey Decimal: 813/.54 21
- LC Class: PS3566.R544 F74 1998
- Preceded by: Clockers
- Followed by: Samaritan

Freedomland is a 1998 mystery novel by Richard Price.

== Plot introduction ==
A woman staggers into a local hospital, too dazed to speak. As the doctors and police try to puzzle out her injuries, her story comes out. She was thrown to the ground and her car was stolen. And, in the back, was her four-year-old son. The town of Dempsey is in turmoil as the search for the child goes on and pressure builds up on all sides.

=== Explanation of the novel's title ===
An abandoned theme park, Freedomtown, is the site of a massive search and discovery, both for characters within the novel and relating to the crime. The secondary meaning refers to the freedoms that the citizens have that are restricted and reduced in special circumstances.

== Setting ==
- Dempsey – A fictional city that is predominantly African- American and poor.
- Gannon – A fictional middle-class city bordering Dempsey.
- Armstrong Housing Projects – A set of buildings in Dempsey in which the bulk of the novel takes place.
- Freedomtown is based loosely on the theme park Freedomland U.S.A.

== Plot summary ==
Brenda Martin walks into the hospital emergency room in a state of shock. As doctors bandage her hands, they find out she is the victim of a carjacking near Armstrong. Detective Lorenzo Council meets with her, and through her tears gets the story that her four-year-old son Cody was in the backseat of the car. She then describes the assailant as being a young black man with a shaved head and scary eyes.

Local reporter Jesse Haus follows up on this relatively minor news story, and is one of the first to learn about the kidnapping. After promising to write a story on Bump Rosen's son, she gets an inside chance to be next to Brenda. As the Gannon and Dempsey police blockade the crime area, Lorenzo works to get more details from Brenda, and Jesse works on details for her story. Lorenzo has Jesse stay with Brenda so she is not alone, and Jesse discovers Brenda's love of classic R&B music.

Lorenzo, under a deadline to solve the case or lose it to the FBI, starts asking all of his contacts for any information. False or no information is the result, and the residents of Armstrong are beginning to express outrage at the blockade. George Howard is arrested in hopes of getting information from him, but his unfair arrest only pushes passions higher. In a last chance to elicit information from Brenda, Lorenzo takes her to the abandoned Freedomtown theme park and opens up to her, hoping that she will do the same in turn.

Ben Haus brings in Karen Collucci and the Friends of Kent (an organization that searches for missing children) to speak to Brenda and organize a search party for Cody. They figure the most likely place to search would be an abandoned, overgrown mental hospital not too far from where the carjacking occurred. Understanding that the Friends of Kent have a hidden agenda, Jesse sticks close to Brenda and Elaine during the search. Lorenzo has an asthma attack and ends up in the hospital. After he is gone, the group arrives at a building where a child's body had been found years earlier. There, Brenda hears a child crying, and confesses to knowing where Cody is.

Days before, when Brenda had gone downstairs to meet her boyfriend Billy, she came back up and found Cody dead of a Benadryl overdose; she’d previously given it to him so he would sleep while she was with Billy. Brenda panicked and ran away, until she finally called Billy and told him what happened. He went over and took Cody to Freedomtown and buried him in front of the Chicago Fire exhibit, as per a written request from Brenda. When Brenda returned, Cody was gone and the spot was cleaned up. Then, while sitting next to the railroad and only half thinking about it, she jams her hands into the ground (causing her injuries) and makes her way to the hospital on foot.

As the story comes out, Dempsey residents are outraged, and Lorenzo feels a protest riot is in the air. That night, the feeling subsides when a man dies in an elevator accident. The next day, local leaders plan a march to demonstrate against the unfair treatment they received during the carjacking-kidnapping story. They march into Gannon with a police escort, and then back into Dempsey. At the end of the march, a fight breaks out and another resident is killed.

The novel ends with a funeral for Cody, followed soon after by Brenda's suicide. This seems to end the saga, leaving the residents of both cities emotionally exhausted.

== Characters ==
- Lorenzo Council – Detective with Dempsey Police Department.
- Brenda Martin – Mother of Cody Martin, sister to Danny Martin
- Karen Collucci – Leader of the Friends of Kent
- Cody Martin – Son of Brenda Martin
- Bump Rosen - Lorenzo's partner
- Danny Martin – Brother to Brenda Martin. Officer with the Gannon Police Department.
- Billy Williams – Brenda's boyfriend
- Felicia Mitchell – Billy's girlfriend. Runs the Study Club.

== Major themes ==
- "...it is essentially the story about race, perception and, as Price himself puts it when forced, 'How people dehumanize each other.' "

== Allusions/references to other works ==
The setting of Dempsey and Gannon were seen in Price's novel Clockers.

== Awards and nominations ==
Freedomland hit bestseller lists from coast to coast, including those of the Boston Globe, USA Today and Los Angeles Times; garnered universally rave reviews; and was selected as the Grand Prize Winner of the Imus American Book Award and as a New York Times Notable Book.

== Adaptation ==
Freedomland was turned into a major motion picture and released in 2006.

== Release details ==
- 1998, U.S., Broadway Books, ISBN 0-7679-0024-3, Pub date 1 June 1998, Hardcover
- 2005, U.S., Delta, ISBN 0-385-33513-X, Pub date 29 November 2005, Paperback
