= The Breaks (novel) =

1983 novel by Richard Price

- First edition
- Author: Richard Price
- Language: English
- Genre: Fiction
- Published: 1983
- Publisher: Simon & Schuster
- Publication place: United States

The Breaks is a 1983 novel by Richard Price. The Breaks was Price's fourth novel.

== Overview ==
Peter Keller, a young liberal arts graduate, moves back into his father's apartment in Yonkers after failing to get into law school, and quickly self-destructs.
