= Philip Kaufman =

American film director and screenwriter

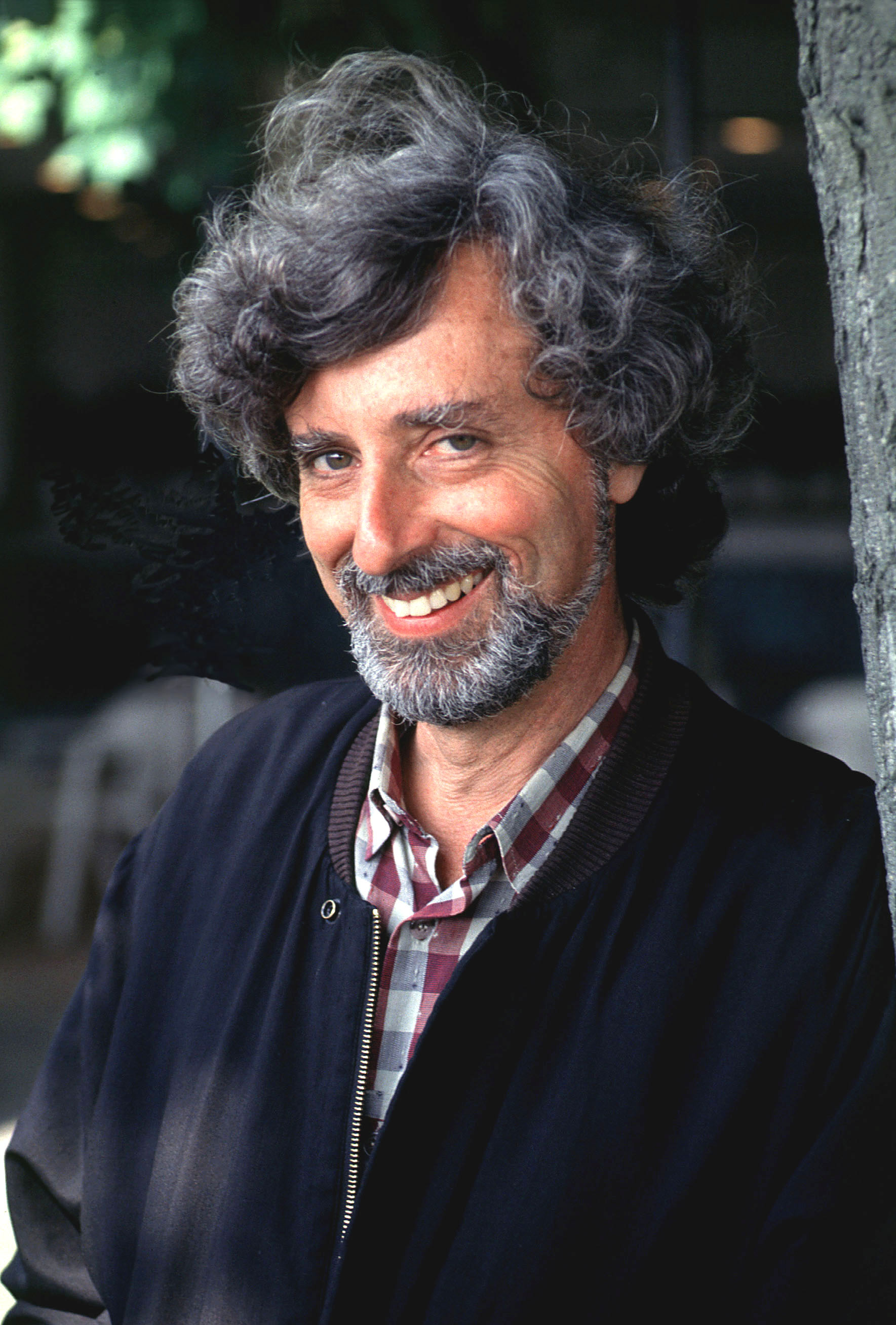
- Kaufman in 1991
- Born: October 23, 1936 (age 90); Chicago, Illinois, U.S.
- Education: University of Chicago (BA)
- Occupations: Director; screenwriter; producer
- Years active: 1964–2012
- Style: Comedy-drama; Satire; Erotic thriller; Erotic dramas; Horror; Thriller; Western
- Spouse: Rose Fisher (m. 1959; died 2009)
- Children: 1
- Website: PhilipKaufman.com

Philip Kaufman (born October 23, 1936) is an American film director and screenwriter who has directed fifteen films over a career spanning nearly five decades. He has received numerous accolades including a BAFTA Award along with nominations for an Academy Award, and a Primetime Emmy Award. He has been described as a "maverick" and an "iconoclast," notable for his versatility and independence, often directing eclectic and controversial films. He is considered an "auteur" whose films have always expressed his personal vision. Kaufman's works have included genres such as realism, horror, fantasy, erotica, western, and crime.

Kaufman’s film The Unbearable Lightness of Being (1988) earned him the BAFTA Award for Best Adapted Screenplay as well as a nomination for the Academy Award for Best Adapted Screenplay. He directed such films as The Wanderers (1979), Rising Sun (1993), the remake of Invasion of the Body Snatchers (1978), Henry & June (1990, the first film to be given an NC-17 rating), and Quills (2000). His film The Right Stuff (1983) received eight Academy Award nominations, including Best Picture. He also directed the HBO film Hemingway & Gellhorn (2012), for which he received a Primetime Emmy Award for Outstanding Directing for a Miniseries, Movie or a Dramatic Special nomination.

== Early life and education ==
Kaufman was born in Chicago in 1936, the only son of Elizabeth (née Brandau), a housewife, and Nathan Kaufman, a produce businessman. He was the grandson of German Jewish immigrants. One of his grammar and high school friends was William Friedkin, who also became a director. He developed an early love of movies, and during his youth he would often go to double features.

He attended the University of Chicago where he received a degree in history, and then enrolled at Harvard Law School where he spent a year. He returned to Chicago for a postgraduate degree, hoping to become a professor of history.

He met Saugus, Massachusetts-born Rose Fisher in 1957, when he was 21 and she was 18, and both were undergraduates at the University of Chicago. A year later, in 1958, they married. They had one son, Peter, born in 1960. Rose Kaufman was also a screenwriter and had bit roles in two of her husband's films.

Before graduating Kaufman became involved in the counterculture movement and in 1960 moved to San Francisco. He took various jobs there, including postal worker, and befriended a number of influential people, such as writer Henry Miller. He and his wife then decided to travel and live in Europe for a while where he would teach. After spending time working on a kibbutz in Israel, he taught English and math for two years in Greece and Italy. During his travels he also met author Anaïs Nin, whose relationship with her lover, Henry Miller, later became the inspiration and subject for Kaufman's film Henry & June (1990).

After backpacking in Europe with his wife and their young son, they returned to the United States. His time in Europe heavily influenced Kaufman's decision to become a filmmaker, when he and his wife would wander into small movie theaters showcasing the works of experimental new filmmakers such as John Cassavetes and Shirley Clarke, among others. He recalls the effect of being exposed to those filmmakers as the "start of something new" which would later inspire the European flavor of many of his films: "I could feel the cry of America, the sense of jazz ... So I came back to Chicago in 1962 and set about trying to learn as much as I could, seeing every foreign movie I could."

== Career ==
=== 1964–1977 ===
Goldstein (1964)

Kaufman returned to Chicago, ready to make his first feature film. He went around town looking for funding for his directorial debut, Goldstein (1964), co-written and co-directed with Benjamin Manaster. Kaufman initially conceived of the story in an unfinished novel, but at the urging of Anaïs Nin he then made it into a "mystical comedy" film. It was inspired by a story from Martin Buber's Tales of the Hasidim, and was filmed on location in Chicago with a cast composed of local actors from The Second City comedy troupe.

The film won the Prix de la Nouvelle Critique (New Critics Prize) at the 1964 Cannes Film Festival, with French director Jean Renoir calling it the best American film he had seen in 20 years. François Truffaut, another leading French director, was visiting Chicago when the film premiered and he came to the opening. Kaufman recalled that Truffaut "leaped to his feet" in the middle of the screening and began applauding.

Fearless Frank (1967)

Two years later, Kaufman directed Fearless Frank (1967), a comic book/counterculture fable, which he also wrote and produced. It costarred Jon Voight in his film debut. Kaufman spent four years trying to find a distributor, but the film was a box-office failure when it finally played. While the movie did not gain as much attention as Goldstein, it did help Kaufman land a contract in Universal Studios' Young Directors Program in 1969.

The Great Northfield Minnesota Raid (1972)

In 1972, Kaufman wrote and directed The Great Northfield Minnesota Raid starring Robert Duvall as Jesse James, in what was his first commercial film after the previous two independent ones. He spent a lot of time researching the real life characters when writing the screenplay, although the film took some liberties portraying some of the factual details. The Los Angeles Times wrote that "Kaufman is not an angry revisionist, but seems to be trying to tell it like it must have been, with an amused detachment, which sees the events as something close to an absurd spectacle."

The White Dawn (1974)

Kaufman directed The White Dawn in 1974, a drama based on the novel of the same name by James Houston. Shot in documentary style, a story about whalers, played by Warren Oates, Louis Gossett Jr., and Timothy Bottoms, stranded in the Arctic at the turn of the century. To survive they battle polar bears and take advantage of the Eskimos who had originally saved them.

The Outlaw Josey Wales (1976)

Kaufman wrote and began directing The Outlaw Josey Wales in 1975, but was fired as director after artistic differences with its star Clint Eastwood, who then directed the film himself. The enmity between Kaufman and Eastwood also stemmed from their mutual pursuit of actress Sondra Locke, then 32 and married to Gordon Leigh Anderson.

=== 1978–1983 ===
Invasion of the Body Snatchers (1978)

Kaufman directed the science fiction thriller, Invasion of the Body Snatchers in 1978, which became his first box office hit. It was a remake of the 1956 version. In this version, Kaufman moved the setting to San Francisco and recreated the alien threat as more a horror film than science fiction, and in a way that was disturbing, humorous, and believable. Critic Pauline Kael said "It may be the best movie of its kind ever made." Critics from the San Francisco Chronicle stated that unlike other Hollywood depictions of San Francisco, this representation was "geographically correct to the Powell Street line."

The Wanderers (1979)

In 1979, he directed The Wanderers, based on comic novel by Richard Price. The direction of the film illustrated Kaufman's mastery of genre quite different from his previous films. It is the story of a benign Italian gang of teenagers in the Bronx of 1963, with Ken Wahl and Karen Allen. It was Wahl's debut film, and Allen's second role, and the film has become a cult favorite.

Raiders of the Lost Ark (1981) co-writer

In 1981, Kaufman became involved with the first Indiana Jones film, Raiders of the Lost Ark, for which he received story credit. The story and character of Indiana Jones were created by George Lucas, while Kaufman came up with the MacGuffin in the story being the Ark of the Covenant.

The Right Stuff (1983)

In 1983, Kaufman directed and wrote the screenplay for the critically acclaimed film, The Right Stuff, an adaptation of the best-selling book of the same name by Tom Wolfe. The story is based on the events and lives of the original test pilots who were selected to become the first U.S. astronauts. The film helped launch or boost the careers of numerous little-known actors, including Ed Harris, Scott Glenn, Fred Ward and Dennis Quaid.

Kaufman hired William Goldman to write the screenplay, but after a number of disputes about the focus of the story, Goldman quit and Kaufman wrote the screenplay himself. Goldman wanted the story to portray patriotism and center mostly on the astronauts, whereas Kaufman wanted much of the story to focus on Chuck Yeager (played by Sam Shepard), whom Goldman's script left out completely. Goldman writes in his memoirs, "Phil's heart was with Yeager." And Shepard's biographer, Don Shewey, explains that "though its chief subject is the astronauts, Yeager is the apple of Kaufman's heroic eye." Critic David Thomson agrees:

I think Kaufman picked Shepard for the way he represents the movie star as real man and existentialist ... a man in a leather jacket on a horse meeting a jet plane in the desert. That is an arresting image, and Shepard is all that Kaufman wanted in The Right Stuff.

Historian Michael Barson considers it one of the more ambitious pictures of the 1980s. Roger Ebert said the film was "impressive," noting that the way Kaufman had organized the material into one of the "best recent American movies, is astonishing." The film was nominated for eight Academy Awards (including Best Picture) and won four, yet failed at the box office. Kaufman earned the Writers Guild and Directors Guild nomination for his satiric adaptation of the astronaut program. "It may be the last movie of the heroic 1970s," writes Thomson.

=== 1988–2000 ===
The Unbearable Lightness of Being (1988)

The Unbearable Lightness of Being was directed and co-written by Kaufman in 1988. The film is based on the novel by Milan Kundera which takes place during the Soviet invasion of Czechoslovakia in 1968. Kaufman was nominated for an Academy Award for Best Adapted Screenplay.

Henry & June (1990)

In 1990, he wrote and directed Henry & June, a re-creation of the affairs among and between Henry Miller, June Miller, and Anaïs Nin in 1931 Paris. The film created some controversy when it was released. It was the first film to be given an NC-17 rating by the MPAA.

Rising Sun (1993)

Kaufman directed Rising Sun in 1993, an adaptation of Michael Crichton's thriller which takes place in Los Angeles. The film starred Sean Connery and Wesley Snipes. Crichton angrily withdrew early on as a result of Kaufman softening the book's more anti-Japan posturing.

In 1995, Kaufman narrated China: The Wild East a documentary directed by his son, Peter Kaufman.

Quills (2000)

In 2000, Kaufman directed Quills, a film about the increasingly desperate efforts of the Marquis de Sade's jailers to censor his licentious works, starring Geoffrey Rush, Joaquin Phoenix, Kate Winslet and Michael Caine.

=== 2004–2012 ===
Twisted (2004)

In 2003, he directed Twisted, a thriller about a young policewoman whose casual sex partners are murdered while she herself suffers alcoholic blackouts. It starred Ashley Judd, Samuel L. Jackson and Andy Garcia.

Hemingway & Gellhorn (2012)

In 2012, eight years after his previous film, Kaufman directed an HBO biopic about Ernest Hemingway and his relationship with Martha Gellhorn entitled Hemingway & Gellhorn. It starred Clive Owen and Nicole Kidman. The film had been planned for many years, but languished as a project so Kaufman could care for his wife Rose, who was fighting a cancer which would prove terminal. Kidman read the script and told him, "I want to do it ... no matter how long it takes. I'm in." The film was nominated for 15 Primetime Emmy Awards, including one for Kaufman for Outstanding Directing for a Miniseries, Movie, or Dramatic Special.

== Personal life ==
Kaufman and his wife Rose Kaufman met in 1958 and married the following year. Their only son, Peter, was born in March 1960. Rose, appeared in bit roles in Henry & June and Invasion of the Body Snatchers. She co-wrote the screenplays of The Wanderers and Henry & June. Peter Kaufman was the producer of Henry & June, Rising Sun, Quills, Twisted, and Hemingway & Gellhorn. She died in 2009, aged 70, from cancer.

Peter is married to Christine Pelosi, daughter of Paul and Nancy Pelosi, the former Speaker of the United States House of Representatives, and they have a daughter, Isabella, born in 2009.

Kaufman lives in San Francisco, where he also runs his production company, Walrus and Associates.

== Filmography ==
=== Film ===
Year	Film	Director	Writer	Producer	Notes
1964	Goldstein	Yes	Yes	Yes	Co-writer and director Benjamin Manaster
1967	Fearless Frank	Yes	Yes	Yes	
1972	The Great Northfield, Minnesota Raid	Yes	Yes	No	
1974	The White Dawn	Yes	No	No	
1976	The Outlaw Josey Wales	No	Yes	No	Based on the novel The Rebel Outlaw: Josey Wales
1978	Invasion of the Body Snatchers	Yes	No	No	Remake of the 1956 film
1979	The Wanderers	Yes	Yes	No	Based on the 1974 novel, adapted with Rose Kaufman
1981	Raiders of the Lost Ark	No	Story	No	With George Lucas
1983	The Right Stuff	Yes	Yes	No	Based on the 1979 novel
1988	The Unbearable Lightness of Being	Yes	Yes	No	Based on the 1984 novel, adapted with Jean-Claude Carrière
1990	Henry & June	Yes	Yes	No	Written with Rose Kaufman
1993	Rising Sun	Yes	Yes	No	Based on the 1992 novel, adapted with Michael Backes and Michael Crichton
1994	China: The Wild East	No	No	Yes	Documentary film
2000	Quills	Yes	No	No	Based on the 1995 play
2004	Twisted	Yes	No	No	

Also credited as "Based on characters created by" for many post-Raiders Indiana Jones films and video games.

=== Television ===
Year	Film	Director	Writer	Producer	Notes	Ref.
2012	Hemingway & Gellhorn	Yes	No	No	HBO Television film	

Appearances

Year	Film	Role	Notes	Ref.
1978	Invasion of the Body Snatchers	City Official on Phone	Voice cameo	
1988	The Unbearable Lightness of Being	Man walking on street outside Sabina's flat	Cameo	
2004	Lumps of Joy	Himself	Short film	
2017	Adventures in Moviegoing	Host	Episode: "Kareem Abdul-Jabbar"	

== Awards and nominations ==
Year	Association	Category	Project	Result
1972	Writers Guild of America	Best Drama Written for the Screen	The Great Northfield, Minnesota Raid	Nominated
1981	Writers Guild of America	Best Comedy Written for the Screen	Raiders of the Lost Ark	Nominated
1983	Writers Guild of America	Best Adapted Screenplay	The Right Stuff	Nominated
1983	Directors Guild of America	Outstanding Direction of a Motion Picture	The Right Stuff	Nominated
1988	Writers Guild of America	Best Adapted Screenplay	Unbearable Lightness of Being	Nominated
1988	Academy Award	Best Adapted Screenplay	Unbearable Lightness of Being	Nominated
1988	BAFTA Award	Best Adapted Screenplay	Unbearable Lightness of Being	Won
2012	Primetime Emmy Award	Outstanding Directing for TV Movie or a Dramatic Special	Hemingway and Gellhorn	Nominated
2012	Directors Guild of America	Outstanding Direction of a Miniseries or Movie	Hemingway and Gellhorn	Nominated

Accolades received by Kaufman's directed films
Year	Film	Academy Awards		BAFTAs		Golden Globes	
Year	Film	Nominations	Wins	Nominations	Wins	Nominations	Wins
1983	The Right Stuff	8	4			1	
1988	The Unbearable Lightness of Being	2		1	1	2	
1990	Henry & June	1					
2000	Quills	3		4		2	
Total		14	4	5	1	5	

== Reception ==
According to film historian Annette Insdorf, "no other living American director has so consistently and successfully made movies for adults, tackling sensuality, artistic creation, and manipulation by authorities." Other critics note that Kaufman's films are "strong on mood and atmosphere," with powerful cinematography and a "lyrical, poetic style" to portray different historic periods. His later films have a somewhat European style, but the stories always "stress individualism and integrity, and are clearly American."
