= Richard Price (writer) =

American novelist and screenwriter (born 1949)

- Born: October 12, 1949 (age 77); The Bronx, New York, U.S.
- Education: Cornell University (BA); Columbia University (MFA)
- Occupations: Novelist; screenwriter; journalist
- Spouse: Lorraine Adams
- Writing career
- Pen name: Harry Brandt
- Period: 1974–present
- Genres: Crime fiction, drama, mystery
- Notable works: The Wanderers, Clockers

Richard Price (born October 12, 1949) is an American novelist and screenwriter, known for the books The Wanderers (1974), Clockers (1992) and Lush Life (2008). Price's novels explore late-20th-century urban America in a gritty, realistic manner that has brought him considerable literary acclaim. Several of his novels are set in a fictional northern New Jersey city called Dempsy.

Price has also written screenplays for television dramas such as The Wire, The Outsider, The Night Of, and The Deuce. For writing The Color of Money (1986), a feature film directed by Martin Scorsese and based on the 1984 novel of the same name by Walter Tevis, Price received a nomination for the Academy Award for Best Adapted Screenplay.

== Early life and education ==
Price was born in the Bronx, New York City, the son of Harriet (Rosenbaum) and Milton Price, a window dresser. A self-described "lower middle class Jewish kid", he grew up in a housing project in the northeast Bronx. He graduated from the Bronx High School of Science in 1967 and obtained a B.A. from Cornell University and an MFA from Columbia University. He also did graduate work at Stanford University.

== Career ==
Price's first novel was The Wanderers (1974), a coming-of-age story set in the Bronx in 1962, written when Price was 24 years old. It was adapted into a film in 1979, with a screenplay by Rose Kaufman and Philip Kaufman and directed by the latter.

His novel Clockers, published in 1992, was nominated for the National Book Critics Circle Award. In 1995, it was adapted into a film directed by Spike Lee; Price and Lee shared writing credits for the screenplay.

In his review of Price's novel Lush Life (2008), Walter Kirn compared Price to Raymond Chandler and Saul Bellow. In July 2010, a group art show inspired by Lush Life was held in nine galleries in New York City.

Price wrote a detective novel entitled The Whites under the pen name Harry Brandt. The book was released February 17, 2015. Film producer Scott Rudin will be producing a film version of the novel.

Price has written numerous screenplays, including The Color of Money (1986) (for which he was nominated for an Oscar), Life Lessons (the Martin Scorsese segment of New York Stories) (1989), Sea of Love (1989), Mad Dog and Glory (1993), Ransom (1996), and Shaft (2000). He wrote the screenplay for the film Child 44, which was released in April 2015. Price did uncredited work on the film American Gangster (2007). He also served as executive producer on the film Ethan Frome (1993).

Price wrote and conceptualized the 18-minute music video for Michael Jackson's "Bad". He also wrote for the HBO series The Wire, winning the Writers Guild of America Award for Best Dramatic Series at the February 2008 ceremony for his work on the fifth season of the series. He created a police drama series NYC 22 in 2012, it was cancelled after one season. His eight-part HBO miniseries The Night Of premiered in July 2016. Also premiering on HBO, in September 2017, was the series The Deuce—co-written and executive produced by Price. He acts as the showrunner for the 2020 HBO miniseries The Outsider, based on a novel by Stephen King.

Price is often cast in cameo roles in the films he writes.

He has published articles in The New York Times, Esquire, The New Yorker, The Village Voice, Rolling Stone and others. He has taught writing at Binghamton University, Hofstra University, Columbia University, Yale University, and New York University.

== Awards ==
In 1999, he received an American Academy of Arts and Letters Arts and Letters Award in Literature. He was inducted into the academy in 2009.

== Personal life ==
Price lives in Harlem in New York City, and is married to the journalist and author Lorraine Adams.

== Bibliography ==
=== Novels ===
- The Wanderers (1974)
- Bloodbrothers (1976)
- Ladies' Man (1978)
- The Breaks (1983)
- Clockers (1992)
- Freedomland (1998)
- Samaritan (2003)
- Lush Life (2008)
- The Whites (2015) (as Harry Brandt)
- Lazarus Man (2024)

=== Screenplays ===
- The Color of Money (1986)
- Streets of Gold (1986)
- New York Stories, Life Lessons segment (1989)
- Sea of Love (1989)
- Night and the City (1992)
- Mad Dog and Glory (1993)
- Clockers (1995)
- Kiss of Death (1995)
- Ransom (1996)
- Shaft (2000)
- Freedomland (2006)
- Child 44 (2015)

=== Teleplays ===
- The Wire (2002)
- NYC 22 (2012)
- The Night Of (2016)
- The Deuce (2017–19)
- The Outsider (2020)

== See also ==
- List of people from Harlem
