= Alex Turner (director) =

American filmmaker (born 1971)

- Born: 1971 (age 54–55); New York City, New York, U.S.
- Occupations: Director, producer, writer

Alex Turner (born 1971) is an American film director, producer and screenwriter, best known for his work in the horror film genre, including the film Dead Birds.

== Biography ==
Turner was born and raised in New York City, New York. He made his first film with a home movie camera given to him by his father, photographer Pete Turner when he was nine years old on Super 8mm. After graduating from the film program at SUNY Purchase, Turner moved to Los Angeles and worked on commercials and as a production assistant on low budget horror films, such as Anthony Hickox's Warlock: The Armageddon.

Alex's short film Chuck screened in over thirty film festivals. It was featured on the Sci-Fi Channel, and won the Rod Serling award at the 2001 Long Island Film Festival. Turner's second short film, Disposal, starring JK Simmons, was broadcast on IFC and was shown as part of LACMA's 2004 Young Directors Night.

Dead Birds, Turner's first feature, starring Henry Thomas, Isaiah Washington and Patrick Fugit, premiered at the 2004 Toronto International Film Festival. In a positive review, Bloody Disgusting said, "Director Alex Turner masterfully tells the story with visuals rather than spending a great deal of time with dialogue."

In 2009 Turner returned to the genre with Red Sands, a psychological thriller starring Shane West, Aldis Hodge, Leonard Roberts, Callum Blue, JK Simmons, Theo Rossi and Noel Gugliemi as US soldiers serving in Afghanistan just after the 2001 US invasion. In a mixed review, Dread Central said, "Director Alex Turner manages to deliver nominal tension and a couple semi-solid scares, but mines no new territory."
