= Red Sands =

- Promotional poster
- Directed by: Alex Turner
- Written by: Simon Barrett
- Produced by: Ash Shah; Timothy Peternel; David Hillary
- Starring: Shane West; Leonard Roberts; Aldis Hodge; Theo Rossi; Callum Blue; Brendan Miller; Noel Gugliemi; Mercedes Mason; J.K. Simmons
- Cinematography: Sean O'Dea
- Edited by: Alexis Spraic
- Music by: String Theory
- Production companies: Tricky Pictures; Deviant Films; Orion Pictures; Stage 6 Films
- Distributed by: Sony Pictures Home Entertainment
- Release date: February 24, 2009
- Running time: 88 minutes
- Country: United States
- Language: English
- Budget: $1-10 million

Red Sands is a 2009 American horror film directed by Alex Turner and written by Simon Barrett, in their second collaboration following Dead Birds. The film stars Shane West, Leonard Roberts, Aldis Hodge, Theo Rossi, Callum Blue, Brendan Miller, Noel Gugliemi, and J.K. Simmons, and introduces Mercedes Mason.

== Plot ==
In 2002, Jeff Keller, who mysteriously survived the slaughter of his troops during a mission, is debriefed by an officer. The facts gathered indicate that he and his soldiers had been ambushed by al-Qaeda fighters who killed them all, leaving Keller for dead.

Two weeks before, in September 2002, Keller's crew gets a mission assignment and sets out for an isolated farmhouse where a family had been slaughtered days before. Their mission is to monitor a road as a sting to catch militants using it to transfer supplies. However, as the platoon’s convoy makes their way towards the objective, an IED detonates near the truck carrying Keller’s squad. Disorientated, the vehicle inadvertently heads off in a different direction from the rest of their platoon. Staff Sergeant Howston manages to make contact with their lieutenant and is ordered to conduct a reconnaissance sweep, sending Keller and a group to search the area. During this unintended stop, the men discover a mysterious shrine; the squad's interpreter Wilcox believes that it was a shrine to a Djinn, a powerful deity made from a smokeless flame, which in mythology matched the legend of a genie. A bored member of their group, Chard Davies, proceeds to fire a few rounds at a stone idol, causing it to shatter. They return to their convoy and go to the farmhouse. While there, a series of bizarre events unfold.

The squad travels to a nearby village to announce their presence, only to find it abandoned, with the only sign of inhabitants being a man lying dead and half buried in the sand. A sandstorm comes up and the group catches an unnamed Afghan woman running in, seeking shelter. Unable to speak her language, they cannot understand what she is saying. Though dubious to her arrival, they keep her in case there are more. During the following days, tension begins to mount in the group. Staff Sergeant Howston is unable to reach any of their allies by radio; when Wilcox attempts to, he hears a strange distress call stating that their sergeant has gone AWOL. Howston cannot hear this call. Paranoia begins to get the better of them, when Howston receives word that they missed a car on the road which they cannot see, and their truck's ignition system is destroyed one night.

Meanwhile, Howston and Wilcox are haunted by gruesome images of people they killed. Wilcox goes missing, and the only witness seems to be team member Tino Hull, who sees another member, Jorge Wardell, giving off a terrifying roar before him. That night, Wilcox's dead body is found with his eyes removed and his face in a frozen expression of terror. After a series of vivid and bizarre dreams Hull grabs another member, Trevor Anderson, and holds him at gunpoint as he accuses Wardell of killing Wilcox. Hull opens fire on Wardell and Davies is forced to retaliate, killing Hull. Howston orders them to take the bodies outside, and the next morning, the group is shocked to find that they are missing.

Howston, slowly losing his grip on his sanity, orders Keller and Anderson to keep guard outside while he himself watches to make sure nothing else goes missing. While they are gone, Davies attempts to rape the Afghan girl, and in a heated moment calls Howston a "fucking nigger", prompting Howston to hit him. In anger, Davies attempts to attack Howston, and Howston finally cracks, killing Davies and ordering Anderson and Keller to stash his body outside. Afterwards, Howston goes missing, as does the girl while the remaining two attempt to make radio contact. Keller realizes that the voice he heard on the radio was that of Anderson, when he makes the same radio call he had heard days prior.

The pair plan to make a break for the rest of their group, but the girl appears briefly in the house and Keller goes to find her. Meanwhile, Anderson is confronted by the dead Wilcox who reveals himself to be a hideous creature. Before Anderson can react, however, he is killed by a shot to the head from the stalking Howston. Howston prowls the farm looking for Keller and is shocked when he comes across the same creature that Anderson had seen. His defenses lowered after running, Keller manages to gain the upper hand and slits the Sergeant's throat. Keller then encounters the Afghan girl, who turns out to be the Djinn, and manages to escape by throwing a grenade into the ammo-filled farmhouse. The following morning, Keller is grabbed by something from underneath the sand and pulled down, disappearing under the desert.

The first scene then recaps, and after the commanding officer tells him that he will be returned to the United States, he leaves. Keller then looks toward the camera, his eyes turning black. This reveals that he is in fact the Djinn. As the screen pans out to the desert again, it is revealed to the audience that Keller is dead, half buried in the sand, his eyes removed and his mouth open wide in terror, similarly to the man from the abandoned village early in the film . The screen then goes dark, and the credits roll.

== Cast ==
- Shane West as SPC Jeff Keller
- Leonard Roberts as SSG Marcus Howston
- Aldis Hodge as PFC Trevor Anderson
- Callum Blue as PFC Gregory Wilcox
- Brendan Miller as PFC Chard Davies
- Theo Rossi as PFC Tino Hull
- Noel Gugliemi as PFC Jorge Wardell (as Noel G)
- Mercedes Mason as Afghan Woman
- J.K. Simmons as LTC Arson
- Fahim Fazli as Goat herder
- Govinda Touzene as Afghan child

== Production ==
=== Development ===
On June 5, 2007, under the title The Stone House, the film was announced as a sequel to Dead Birds with Simon Barrett and Alex Turner returning as writer and director respectively, with filming expected to begin that summer. The following day, Turner clarified that the film was not Dead Birds 2 but instead a "companion piece" similar to The Devil's Backbone and Pan's Labyrinth. The director described the film as a more action-oriented film and "in-your-face". Barrett conceived the idea for the film from the Iraq Invasion. In September 2007, Brendan Miller, Shane West, Aldis Hodge, Leonard Roberts, Theo Rossi, and Noel Gugliemi were reported to have joined the cast.

=== Filming ===
Filming was underway by August 2007 and concluded on September 5, 2007.

== Release ==
Sony Pictures Home Entertainment released Red Sands on DVD on February 24, 2009. By December 2008, the film was retitled to Red Sands.

== Reception ==
Dread Central rated it 2.5/5 stars and called it a "lukewarm entry" in the military horror genre that is not as good as R-Point. Clark Douglas of DVD Verdict wrote that the concept would have been better realized as a 45-minute Masters of Horror episode. Justin Felix of DVD Talk rated it 2/5 stars and also wrote that it should have been a short film.

== Potential sequel ==
In January 2009, Barrett told Bloody Disgusting that he and Alex Turner had discussions for a third film and a script was already written. Barrett was consulted to set the film in the future. However, neither were entirely sure if the film would get off the ground.

== See also ==
- Djinns (2010)
