= The Master of Disguise =

- Theatrical release poster
- Directed by: Perry Andelin Blake
- Written by: Dana Carvey; Harris Goldberg
- Produced by: Sid Ganis; Alex Siskin; Barry Bernardi; Todd Garner
- Starring: Dana Carvey; Brent Spiner; Jennifer Esposito; Harold Gould; James Brolin
- Cinematography: Peter Lyons Collister
- Edited by: Peck Prior; Sandy Solowitz
- Music by: Marc Ellis
- Production companies: Revolution Studios; Columbia Pictures; Happy Madison Productions
- Distributed by: Sony Pictures Releasing
- Release date: August 2, 2002
- Running time: 80 minutes
- Country: United States
- Language: English
- Budget: $16 million
- Box office: $43.4 million

The Master of Disguise is a 2002 American adventure comedy film directed by Perry Andelin Blake, written by Dana Carvey and Harris Goldberg; and produced by Sid Ganis, Alex Siskin, Barry Bernardi, and Todd Garner. The film stars Carvey, Brent Spiner, Jennifer Esposito, Harold Gould, and James Brolin. It tells the story of a man who is trained to become a "Master of Disguise" by his grandfather when a master criminal kidnaps his parents.

Produced by Revolution Studios, The Master of Disguise was released by Sony Pictures Releasing on August 2, 2002. The film was universally panned by critics, with many deeming it among the worst films ever made, but was a commercial success, grossing $43.4 million on a $16 million budget.

== Plot ==
In Palermo, Italy in 1979, Fabbrizio Disguisey, the latest in a long line of secret agents known as "The Masters of Disguise", breaks up a smuggling ring run by the evil Devlin Bowman while disguised as Bo Derek. Not wanting his infant son Pistachio to receive the same dangerous future lifestyle as he and his lineage, Fabbrizio decides to keep his family's nature a secret.

Twenty-three years later, Fabbrizio runs an Italian restaurant in an unnamed town in America with his wife and son Pistachio. Released from prison three years earlier, Bowman and his henchmen kidnap Fabbrizio and his wife, forcing Fabbrizio to use his talents to steal legendary artifacts around the world to reestablish Bowman's smuggling ring. After Fabbrizio's disappearance, Pistachio is visited by his grandfather, who reveals Pistachio's heritage and begins training him.

Pistachio gets the basics down and his grandfather gets him an assistant, Jennifer Baker, who is a little confused about what the job entails. The two find one of Bowman's cigars in the alley where his parents were kidnapped. This leads them to the Turtle Club where it was made, where they learn of Bowman's scheme, as well as that he will be at an antiques fair the next day.

Pistachio and Jennifer go to the fair, with Pistachio disguised as an elderly woman. Bowman invites Jennifer to a party at his house. Pistachio goes to the party in disguise and distracts Bowman while Jennifer looks for clues.

That night, Pistachio and Jennifer look through the clues. Bowman's men kidnap Jennifer, so Pistachio talks to his grandfather via a crystal ball and comes up with a scheme to break into Bowman's lair to rescue Jennifer and his parents. They confront Bowman, who has attached a mask of his face to Fabbrizio's head. While the real Bowman escapes, Pistachio fights his father, who is brainwashed to think he is Bowman.

In the end, Pistachio helps his father snap out of his trance, and they free Pistachio's mother and return the artifacts. Pistachio marries Jennifer and becomes an official Master of Disguise. However, they eventually realize that Bowman still got away and has the United States Constitution with him. The Disguiseys locate Bowman in Costa Rica, defeat him in their disguises, and retrieve the Constitution.

== Cast ==
- Dana Carvey as Pistachio Disguisey, a man who follows in the footsteps of his family's legacy by becoming a "Master of Disguise".
  - Dylan and Cole Sprouse as young Pistachio Disguisey
  - Dane Morris as teenage Pistachio Disguisey
- Brent Spiner as Devlin Bowman, a master criminal and enemy of the Disguisey family.
- Jennifer Esposito as Jennifer Baker, a woman who aids Pistachio in fighting Devlin.
- Harold Gould as Grandpa Disguisey, Pistachio's grandfather who trains him in becoming a "Master of Disguise".
- James Brolin as Fabbrizio Disguisey, Pistachio's father and expert "Master of Disguise".
- Maria Canals-Barrera as Sophia
- Mark Devine as Trent
- Edie McClurg as "Mama" Disguisey, Pistachio's mother.
- Austin Wolff as Barney Baker, a young neighbor of the Disguisey family and Jennifer's son.
- Michael Bailey Smith as Bald Henchman, the unnamed bald-headed henchman of Devlin.
- Vincent Riverside as Henchman, an unnamed henchman of Devlin.
- Jay Johnston as Rex
- Mark Ginther, Carrick O'Quinn, Mitch Silpa, and John Tenn as the rest of Devlin's henchmen.
- Jonathan Loughran and Ted Rooney as Security Guards
- Virginia Hawkins as Interview Woman
- Erick Avari as Cigar Maker
- Larry Cedar as Businessman
- Vincent Castellanos as Art Dealer
- Gabriel Pimentel as Boxing Dummy
- Kevin Nealon as White Collar Executive
- Andy Morrow, Naya Rivera, and Julius Ritter as Captain America Kids
- Leland Crooke as Appraiser
- Lisa Foiles as Lisa (uncredited) (deleted scene)
- Kyle Sullivan as Kyle (uncredited) (deleted scene)
- Shane Lyons as Shane (uncredited) (deleted scene)

Kenan Thompson, Bo Derek, Michael Johnson, Jessica Simpson, and an uncredited Jesse Ventura make cameo appearances as themselves.

== Production ==
There is a longstanding rumor that the filming of the scene in the Turtle Club took place on September 11, 2001, the same day as the September 11 attacks, causing production to stop and observe a moment of silence during the terrorist attacks. The rumor states that Dana Carvey was in the full turtle outfit and makeup during the solemn moment. The rumor is occasionally humorously exaggerated to claim Carvey retracted his head into the shell of the turtle costume out of fear. The rumor is believed to have stemmed from a piece of trivia on the film's IMDb page, a section that includes user-generated content and is not subject to rigorous fact-checking. Director Perry Andelin Blake and Carvey both later confirmed that a moment of silence for the victims of the attack was held and that Carvey was in the turtle outfit during the moment of silence, but that the moment took place a few weeks after the attacks. On the morning of September 11, the film was still in pre-production, and filming was scheduled to begin in a couple of weeks.

== Release ==
The Master of Disguise was granted a PG certificate by the British Board of Film Classification for "mild language and mild comic violence". To obtain the PG certificate, seven seconds of material was cut, the reasons being "dangerous imitable technique, a series of head butts".

=== Home media ===
The Master of Disguise was released on VHS and DVD on January 28, 2003, by Columbia TriStar Home Entertainment.

== Soundtrack ==
The Master of Disguise: Music from the Motion Picture

Soundtrack album by Various Artists
- Released: July 23, 2002
- Length: 38:20
- Labels: Music World, Sony

Professional ratings
Review scores
Source	Rating
Allmusic	2.5/5 stars

No.	Title	Writer(s)	Performed by	Length
1.	"M.A.S.T.E.R., Pt. 2" (featuring Lil' Fizz from B2K)	Bryan Bonwell / Marques Houston / Jerome Jones / Kelton Kessee / Tony Oliver	Play	2:56
2.	"Fun"	Rose Falcon / Billy Falcon	Rose Falcon	2:55
3.	"Happy Face"	Beyoncé Knowles / Michael Cooper / Rob Fusari / Calvin Gaines / Falonte Moore	Destiny's Child	4:18
4.	"Eenie Meenie Minie Mo"	Brian Adams / Teron Beal / Eddie Berkeley / Keir Gist	Strong	3:22
5.	"Walking on Sunshine"	Kimberley Rew	Val-C	2:49
6.	"Master of Disguise"	Colleen Fitzpatrick / Jimmy Harry	Vitamin C	3:00
7.	"Double Dutch Bus"	Frankie Smith	Devin Vasquez	3:21
8.	"Conga"	Enrique García	Miami Sound Machine	4:14
9.	"This Could Be Love"	Troy Johnson / Solange Knowles	Solange Knowles	4:02
10.	"Cherry Pie"	Marques Houston / Jerome Jones	Jhené Aiko	3:07
11.	"M.A.S.T.E.R., Pt. 1" (featuring Play)	Bryan Bonwell	Hardhedz / Hardhedzz	4:16
Total length:				38:20

== Reception ==
=== Box office ===
The film opened in Australia on July 31, 2002, in the United States on August 2, 2002, and in the United Kingdom on January 17, 2003, in 2,565 theaters and earned $12,554,650 in the domestic box office, ranking third for the weekend, behind Signs and the second weekend of Austin Powers in Goldmember. The film closed on November 28, 2002, having grossed $40,388,794 domestically and $3,022,207 internationally for a worldwide total of $43,411,001. When the film was released in the United Kingdom, it originally opened at #14, before falling out of the charts completely by the next weekend.

=== Critical response ===
The Master of Disguise was heavily panned by critics. On Rotten Tomatoes, The Master of Disguise has an approval rating of 1% based on 105 reviews with an average rating of 2.6/10, making it the lowest-rated film produced by Revolution Studios to date. Its consensus reads: "An ill-conceived attempt to utilize Dana Carvey's talent for mimicry, The Master of Disguise is an irritating, witless farce weighted down by sophomoric gags." On Metacritic, the film has a score of 12 out of 100 based on reviews from 24 critics, indicating "overwhelming dislike". Audiences surveyed by CinemaScore gave the film a grade "B−" on scale of A to F.

Roger Ebert, awarding the film a rating of one star out of four, reserved some praise for director Perry Andelin Blake's production design, as well as for Carvey's imitative abilities, but saw the overall film as being "like a party guest who thinks he is funny and is wrong". Ebert also noted that the film is only 65 minutes long, but includes 15 minutes of credit cookies in order to qualify as a feature presentation. Jamie Russell at the BBC described the film as being so bad as to make other films such as Deuce Bigalow: Male Gigolo seem like comic equivalents to Citizen Kane: "Never have so many jokes clunked off the screen to such a silent audience. And never has 80 minutes seemed like such an eternity."

Peter Bradshaw, writing for The Guardian, awarded the film two stars out of five, citing a limited number of amusing moments, but criticizing Carvey's characterizations and warning potential audience members that "you might want to put the shotgun in your mouth". Adam Smith in the Radio Times drew attention to the "lame screenplay" and "barely coherent plot", and noted that "when the nearest thing to a genuine joke is the bad guy's propensity for breaking wind whenever he laughs, you can be pretty sure that you're not in the hands of comedy geniuses".

Alan Morrison, writing for Empire, suggested that it was no more than a feeble imitation of the character comedy of the Austin Powers series, concluding that The Master of Disguise was the single worst film ever made: "a film about idiots, made by idiots, for idiots". Comedian and former Mystery Science Theater 3000 host Michael J. Nelson named the film the third-worst comedy ever made.

=== Accolades ===
Bo Derek's cameo in the film was nominated for a Golden Raspberry Award for Worst Supporting Actress, but lost to Madonna in Die Another Day.

At the 2002 Stinkers Bad Movie Awards, the film was nominated for Worst Picture, Worst Actor, and Worst Male Fake Accent – the latter two regarding Carvey. Its only win was a tie with Kung Pow: Enter the Fist for Most Painfully Unfunny Comedy.

Despite its overwhelmingly negative attention, the film was also nominated for Favorite Fart in a Movie at the 2003 Kids' Choice Awards, though it lost to Scooby-Doo.

== See also ==
- List of 21st century films considered the worst
