= Harris Goldberg =

Canadian film director, producer and writer

Harris Goldberg is a Canadian-American director, writer and producer. He co-wrote the 1999 film Deuce Bigalow: Male Gigolo with Rob Schneider and the 2002 film The Master of Disguise with Dana Carvey. In 2007, Goldberg wrote and directed the film Numb, inspired by his own experiences battling an anxiety disorder.

== Early life ==
Goldberg's first passion was tennis. He reached a Canadian (SW Ontario) Junior Tennis ranking of number two. His older brother, Daniel Goldberg, had attained success writing and producing films, including Stripes and Meatballs, both starring Bill Murray.

== Film career ==
Goldberg returned to writing. Goldberg moved to Los Angeles, where he sold his first screenplay within a week. He signed with the William Morris Agency, and soon secured his first job writing for Matty Simmons, owner of National Lampoon and producer of Animal House.

A multi-picture deal at Disney followed, including: I'll Be Home for Christmas starring Jonathan Taylor Thomas and Jessica Biel; a sequel to The Mighty Ducks; and the award-winning Hallmark film, A Step Toward Tomorrow, a story about two young brothers, one reliant on a wheelchair after an accident. Premiering to rave reviews during CBS Sweeps Week in the winter of 1996, the film was also noted for a touching and memorable performance by Christopher Reeve, in his first acting role after his tragic horseback riding accident.

In 2003, Goldberg directed the short film, Where's Angelo?, a Get Shorty-style production, which starred Robert Forster, Michael Madsen, Beverly D'Angelo, and Wolfgang Bodison and was honored at the Hollywood Film Festival.

=== Deuce Bigalow ===
Goldberg became friends with SNL alum Rob Schneider, and together they gave a series of stand-up comedy performances, including co-hosting the Montreal Comedy Festival and a memorable appearance on Late Night with Conan O'Brien, where the duo performed as the satirical Blue Man Ass Group. Goldberg subsequently accompanied Schneider to Chicago, where Schneider was to be master of ceremonies at a fundraiser for President Bill Clinton and Vice President Al Gore. An hour before the event, Goldberg was asked to fill in by Clinton himself, after the Secret Service expressed concerns that Schneider's public image - he was then starring in Men Behaving Badly - might reflect unfavorably on the President. Goldberg later described the experience as the most surreal of his life.

Goldberg went on to write and co-produce Deuce Bigalow: Male Gigolo under Adam Sandler's Happy Madison shingle. Touchstone acquired the project after a bidding war with New Line. Modestly budgeted at $16.5 million, the film was a box office success, grossing $68 million domestically and over $100 million internationally.

Goldberg next partnered with Dana Carvey, writing and co-producing The Master of Disguise for Sony Pictures, which grossed a profitable $40 million domestically. Without a Paddle followed, starring Seth Green, Matthew Lillard, Dax Sheppard and Burt Reynolds which grossed $58 million for Paramount Pictures.

=== Anxiety and Numb ===
Goldberg crossed over to television writing during this period, selling pilots to HBO, CBS, NBC, ABC, TNT and USA. It was during this time that Goldberg developed depersonalization disorder, an anxiety and stress reaction he calls the most hideous and frightening time of his life. He would go on to say that he did not know if he would make it from one day to the next.

After recovering, Goldberg wrote the screenplay Numb about the experience. Actor Matthew Perry attached himself to the project, and soon afterward Goldberg landed his feature film directorial debut with a cast that included Mary Steenburgen, Kevin Pollak, and Lynn Collins. The film won many festival awards, including Best Feature at Chicago's GenArt Film Festival and the Ojai International Film Festival. Goldberg has stated that the film was not only cathartic personally, but that it also proved helpful to many sufferers and drew attention to the disorder from the medical community.

In May 2013, Goldberg started his second directorial effort on Alex & the List. Shooting was completed in Los Angeles, and Patrick Fugit stars with Jennifer Morrison, Karen Gillan, Aaron Staton, Eddie Kaye Thomas, Giles Martini, JoBeth Williams and Victoria Tennant. The film was released on May 4, 2018, by Gravitas Ventures.

=== Teaching ===
Between projects, Goldberg began teaching film at UCLA with an emphasis on the practicalities of surviving the business. He subsequently became a professor of film and television at McMaster University in Ontario Canada.
