= Corsicana (film) =

- Directed by: Isaiah Washington
- Written by: Robert Johnson; Isaiah Washington
- Starring: Isaiah Washington; Noel Gugliemi; Lew Temple; Stacey Dash
- Distributed by: Rose Dove Entertainment
- Release date: August 26, 2022
- Running time: 102 minutes
- Country: United States
- Language: English

Corsicana is a 2022 American Western film, featuring Isaiah Washington in his directorial debut. The film was co-written by Washington and Robert Johnson, and stars Washington alongside Noel Gugliemi, Lew Temple, and Stacey Dash. Washington portrays Bass Reeves, a former slave who went on to become the first noted black deputy U.S. Marshal, as he tracks an outlaw gang to Corsicana, Texas.

== Synopsis ==
"Deputy U.S. Marshal Bass Reeves reunites with his former partner turned fugitive Sam Tanner. They find themselves in a race against time as they track Jack Donner and his vicious gang of outlaws to the oil-rich town of Corsicana."

== Cast ==
- Isaiah Washington as Bass Reeves
  - Thomas Q. Jones as Young Bass Reeves
- Lew Temple as Jack Donner
- Noel Guglielmi as Juan
- Stacey Dash as Jennie
- Billy Blair as Miller
- Amber McNutt as Becky
- Jason Johnson as Sam Tanner

== Production and release ==
Washington was first informed of the project by actor Robert Davi; with Washington becoming enthralled by Bass Reeves after having a conversation with a woman who had been attempting to produce the project. Washington offered to direct the work, after production almost ceased due to internal disputes surrounding the film.

In September 2020, Deadline reported that Washington was directing Corsicana, a film based on the life of Bass Reeves, with filming currently underway. The film features the city Corsicana, Texas, with screenwriter Robert Johnson noting that he wanted "to bring something to the city of Corsicana, a city I love...Bass Reeves never set foot in Corsicana and that's why it's historical fiction but I did want to pay homage to Corsicana.

The film received a limited theatrical release in August 2022, in Texas. Washington promoted the film's release in Chicago, hosting screenings, meet and greet, and Q&A events.

In May 2023, 101 Films International picked up international distribution rights to the film.

== Reception ==
On review aggregator Rotten Tomatoes, the film has received just two member reviews, both of which are positive.

The audience review on Rotten Tomatoes has an average rating 3.2 stars out of 5.

== Awards and nominations ==
Year	Award	Category	Result
2023	Best Film	C&I Movie Awards	Nominated
