= The Amateurs =

2005 film by Michael Traeger

- Theatrical release poster
- Directed by: Michael Traeger
- Written by: Michael Traeger
- Produced by: Scott Kroop; Adam Merims; Scott Strauss; Aaron Ryder
- Starring: Jeff Bridges; Tim Blake Nelson; Joe Pantoliano; William Fichtner; Ted Danson; Patrick Fugit; Lauren Graham; Jeanne Tripplehorn
- Cinematography: Denis Maloney
- Edited by: Raúl Dávalos
- Music by: Nic. tenBroek
- Distributed by: First Look Studios
- Release dates: February 2005 (Santa Barbara Film Festival); April 22, 2006 (United States)
- Country: United States
- Language: English
- Box office: $64,253

The Amateurs, originally called The Moguls, is a 2005 comedy film written and directed by Michael Traeger and starring Jeff Bridges. The story revolves around six friends in a small town in the United States who decide to make a full-length amateur adult film.

== Plot ==
Six friends come together to try to gain fame by making the world's most "innocent" adult movie ever made.

After the clueless crew finally completes the film, they screen it for the first time at the local bar. The brother of a girl whose scene ultimately was not used (besides some brief shots of her face) barges in, takes the reel off the projector, covers it in whiskey and sets it aflame.

It is revealed that this was the only print they had and that all their work has been lost. However, the cinematographer had been videotaping the entire production process on mini DV tapes. He then edits these down into a completely innocent documentary, minus the nudity and sex scenes, about the trials and tribulations of making (and then losing) their original film. This new version is released as the titular The Amateurs which becomes a critical and financial success on the independent film circuit.

== Cast ==
- Jeff Bridges as Andy Sargentee
- Ted Danson as "Moose"
- William Fichtner as Otis
- Patrick Fugit as Emmett
- Lauren Graham as Peggy
- Glenne Headly as Helen Tatelbaum
- Tim Blake Nelson as Barney Macklehatton
- Joe Pantoliano as Some Idiot
- Valerie Perrine as V
- Jeanne Tripplehorn as Thelma
- Isaiah Washington as Homer
- Eileen Brennan as Mrs. Cherkiss
- John Hawkes as Moe
- Brad Henke as Ron
- Steven Weber as Howard
- Tom Bower as Floyd
- Dawn Didawick as Clara
- Norm O'Neill as Clara's Man
- Alex D. Linz as Billy

== Release ==
The film was released under the title The Moguls in the United Kingdom on April 28, 2006. The film was released under the title The Amateurs and opened in limited release in the United States on December 7, 2007.

Jeff Bridges has called it one of his favorite films and claimed the distributor went bankrupt which caused the film to have a small release.

== Reception ==
On the review aggregator website Rotten Tomatoes, 19% of 26 critics' reviews are positive. The website's consensus reads: "The Amateurs is a largely unfunny sex comedy that squanders a talented cast." Metacritic, which uses a weighted average, assigned the film a score of 45 out of 100, based on 6 critics, indicating "mixed or average" reviews.
