= Exit Wounds =

2001 film by Andrzej Bartkowiak

- Theatrical release poster
- Directed by: Andrzej Bartkowiak
- Screenplay by: Ed Horowitz; Richard D'Ovidio
- Based on: Exit Wounds (1990 novel) by John Westermann
- Produced by: Joel Silver; Dan Cracchiolo
- Starring: Steven Seagal; DMX; Isaiah Washington; Anthony Anderson; Michael Jai White; Bill Duke; Jill Hennessy
- Cinematography: Glen MacPherson
- Edited by: Derek Brechin
- Music by: Damon "Grease" Blackman; Jeff Rona
- Production companies: Village Roadshow Pictures; NPV Entertainment; Silver Pictures
- Distributed by: Warner Bros. Pictures
- Release date: March 16, 2001
- Running time: 101 minutes
- Country: United States
- Language: English
- Budget: $25‒33 million
- Box office: $80 million

Exit Wounds is a 2001 American action thriller film directed by Andrzej Bartkowiak, produced by Joel Silver, and starring Steven Seagal, DMX, Isaiah Washington, Anthony Anderson, Michael Jai White, Bill Duke, Tom Arnold and Jill Hennessy. Seagal plays Orin Boyd, a Detroit police detective notorious for pushing the limits of the law in his quest for justice. The screenplay is based on a novel of the same name by John Westermann.

This is the second of three films directed by Bartkowiak and produced by Silver that focus on martial arts-based action in an urban setting with a hip-hop soundtrack, following Romeo Must Die (2000) and preceding Cradle 2 the Grave (2003). The three films feature many of the same cast, key crew, and locations.

The film received mostly negative reviews from critics, who noted that Seagal "aged rather badly" and criticized the plot holes and writing, but was a moderate success, having grossed $80 million worldwide against a budget of $25‒33 million. This became Steven Seagal's final film to be distributed by Warner Bros. Pictures as it marked the end of his long-standing relationship with the studio that launched his career.

== Plot ==
Detroit Police Department's detective Orin Boyd is a cop in Detroit's 21st precinct, who saves the Vice President of the United States from a right-wing militant group trying to kill him. Because he disobeyed orders, however, Captain Frank Daniels transfers Boyd to the 15th precinct — the city's worst.

Boyd's new captain, former internal affairs officer Annette Mulcahy, knows of his reputation, and she tells him that she will not tolerate insubordination. Annette sends Boyd to an anger management class where he meets Henry Wayne, the high-strung host of a local talk show called Detroit AM. Boyd comes across local drug dealer Latrell Walker and his fast-talking sidekick T.K. Johnson doing a shady deal with a man named Matt Montini. After a brief fight, Boyd discovers that Montini has been working undercover trying to nail Walker and Boyd ruined the sting, and that does not sit well with Montini's musclebound partner Useldinger.

Sergeant Lewis Strutt steps in to cool things down when Boyd gets in a fight with Useldinger. After Boyd stumbles upon the theft of $5,000,000 worth of heroin from evidence storage, Boyd and new partner George Clark begin focusing their efforts on Walker and T.K. Intrigued by what little they have on Walker, they investigate why he has been visiting Shaun Rollins. Henry discovers that Walker is not a drug dealer, but a computer expert and billionaire whose real name is Leon Rollins, Shaun Rollins' brother. After an attempt on his life, Boyd confronts Leon, who explains that a group of corrupt cops needed a fall guy for a deal gone bad and pinned it on Shaun. It is further revealed that Strutt is the leader of the group, which also includes Montini and Useldinger. Leon and his friend Trish have been videotaping the activities of Strutt's gang, hoping that it might help prove Shaun's innocence and get him out of jail.

Boyd meets Mulcahy at a parking lot to inform her what he has uncovered. Montini, Useldinger, and some other men try to kill Boyd and Annette. Mulcahy is killed in the chase and Boyd escapes. Boyd calls Frank and tells him that Strutt will be having a meeting at a warehouse in about an hour, to sell the heroin that was stolen. Strutt plans to try to sell it to Leon and T. K., not knowing that Leon is working against him. Frank promises that he will be there with some backup.

Boyd and Daniels show up, but Strutt tells Frank to keep Boyd under control. Boyd realizes that it is Frank who is behind everything. Clark blows open the door and barges in with backup, including police chief Hinges. Useldinger shoots Boyd and as he is about to shoot him again, Clark shoots Useldinger dead. Chief Hinges kills Frank by shooting him four times with a shotgun. After a fight with Boyd, Strutt grabs a case full of money and runs up to the roof, where a helicopter is waiting. Montini gets the upper hand in his fight with Leon after he damages Leon's vision with indigo fabric dye. Leon manages to stab Montini in the leg with a piece of broken glass, before killing him by having his neck impaled on a clothes rack. As the helicopter ladder is dragging Boyd across the roof with Strutt hanging on to the ladder, Boyd hooks the ladder to the roof; Strutt falls and is impaled on a metal pipe.

At dawn, Leon gives Hinges the videotape that proves the corruption, hoping that the tape will help prove Shaun's innocence. Hinges does not believe the courts will care about the tape, so he had Shaun released from county about an hour before. Boyd decides to stay with the 15th precinct with George as his partner, and T.K. becomes Henry's television co-host.

== Cast ==
- Steven Seagal as Detective Orin Boyd
- DMX as Leon Rollins / Latrell Walker
- Isaiah Washington as Detective George Clark
- Anthony Anderson as T.K. Johnson
- Michael Jai White as Sergeant Lewis Strutt
- Bill Duke as Chief Hinges
- Jill Hennessy as Commander Annette Mulcahy
- Tom Arnold as Henry Wayne
- Bruce McGill as Captain Frank Daniels
- David Vadim as Detective Matt Montini
- Eva Mendes as Trish
- Matthew G. Taylor as Detective Useldinger
- Paolo Mastropietro as Detective Parker
- Shane Daly as Detective "Fitz"
- Drag-On as Shaun Rollins
- Jennifer Irwin as Linda
- Daniel Kash as Rory
- Christopher Lawford as Vice President of the United States
- Arnold Pinnock as Alan Morris
- John Ralston as Eric

== Production ==
The film is based on the book of the same name by John Westermann. The book is set in Long Island, New York, but the film moves the setting to Detroit. Silver and Warner Bros. Pictures president of worldwide motion pictures Lorenzo di Bonaventura brought Seagal back to Warner Bros. for the film under a pay-or-play deal.

Filming took place in 2000 in Toronto, Ontario; Hamilton, Ontario and the Centre Street Bridge in Calgary, Alberta. The club scene inside was filmed at the Guvernment nightclub in Toronto. The exterior of the club was outside of the Tonic nightclub in Toronto.

The film reunites actors DMX, Isaiah Washington and Anthony Anderson with Polish film director Andrzej Bartkowiak, with whom they first worked together on the earlier 2000 film Romeo Must Die. It is the second of three films directed by Andrzej Bartkowiak and produced by Joel Silver that focus on martial arts based action in an urban setting with a hip-hop soundtrack and featuring many of the same cast. Two years later they collaborated again on the film Cradle 2 the Grave.

Eva Mendes' voice was dubbed over by another, unidentified actress without her prior knowledge, as producers felt Mendes didn't sound "intelligent enough".

Dion Lam was the film's martial arts choreographer.

=== Accident on set ===
Stuntman Chris Lamon died of head injuries on August 23, 2000, six days after a stunt went wrong on the Exit Wounds set in Hamilton, Ontario. A van was being towed along a street upside-down as part of a chase scene; he was supposed to roll safely out, but apparently struck his head. Another stuntman suffered a concussion in the same incident.

== Music ==
A soundtrack containing hip hop music was released on March 20, 2001, by Virgin Records. It peaked at number 8 on the Billboard 200 and number 5 on the Top R&B/Hip-Hop Albums.

== Reception ==
=== Box office ===
Exit Wounds debuted at number one at the US box office, grossing $18.5 million in the United States and Canada in its opening weekend. It was considered a surprise hit movie, as it grossed over $50 million in the United States and Canada and almost $30 million throughout the rest of the world. It was hailed as Seagal's big "comeback".

=== Critical response ===
On Rotten Tomatoes, it has an approval rating of 35% based on 63 reviews. The site's critical consensus states: "It probably goes without saying that Exit Wounds is loaded with plotholes and bad dialogue." On Metacritic, the film has a score of 39 out of 100 based on 9 reviews, indicating "generally unfavorable" reviews. Audiences polled by CinemaScore gave the film an average grade of "A−" on an A+ to F scale.

Lawrence Van Gelder of The New York Times gave the film three out of five and wrote: "For those in search of action-filled escapist entertainment who are willing to jettison expectations of credibility into the nearest popcorn tub, Exit Wounds ... will do to pass time on an inclement day". Owen Gleiberman of Entertainment Weekly wrote: "In its low grade way, this blithely brutal cops and drugs thriller is an efficient hot wire entertainment". Gleiberman singled out Jill Hennessy for praise, saying that she "takes the minor character of Seagal's precinct commander and invests her with an intelligence and a flirty warm panache that sparkles on screen".

Todd McCarthy of Variety magazine gave the film a negative review, particularly Seagal's performance saying that he "makes one wonder how he ever managed to be regarded as anything resembling a movie star". McCarthy complained that the action scenes were "routine and unimaginative" lacking the flair director Bartkowiak had shown in Romeo Must Die. McCarthy was also critical of unconvincing use of easily recognizable Toronto locations as a stand in for Detroit. Jonathan Foreman of the New York Post suggested that Barkowiak was trying to make a John Woo movie, but simply did not have the skills. Foreman called the screenplay "embarrassingly clunky and inane". He concluded: "It's hard to know which is more offensive, Exit Wounds' ineptitude or its disgusting, cynical brutality. But the people responsible for it are crass and shameless".
