= Theo Rossi =

American actor

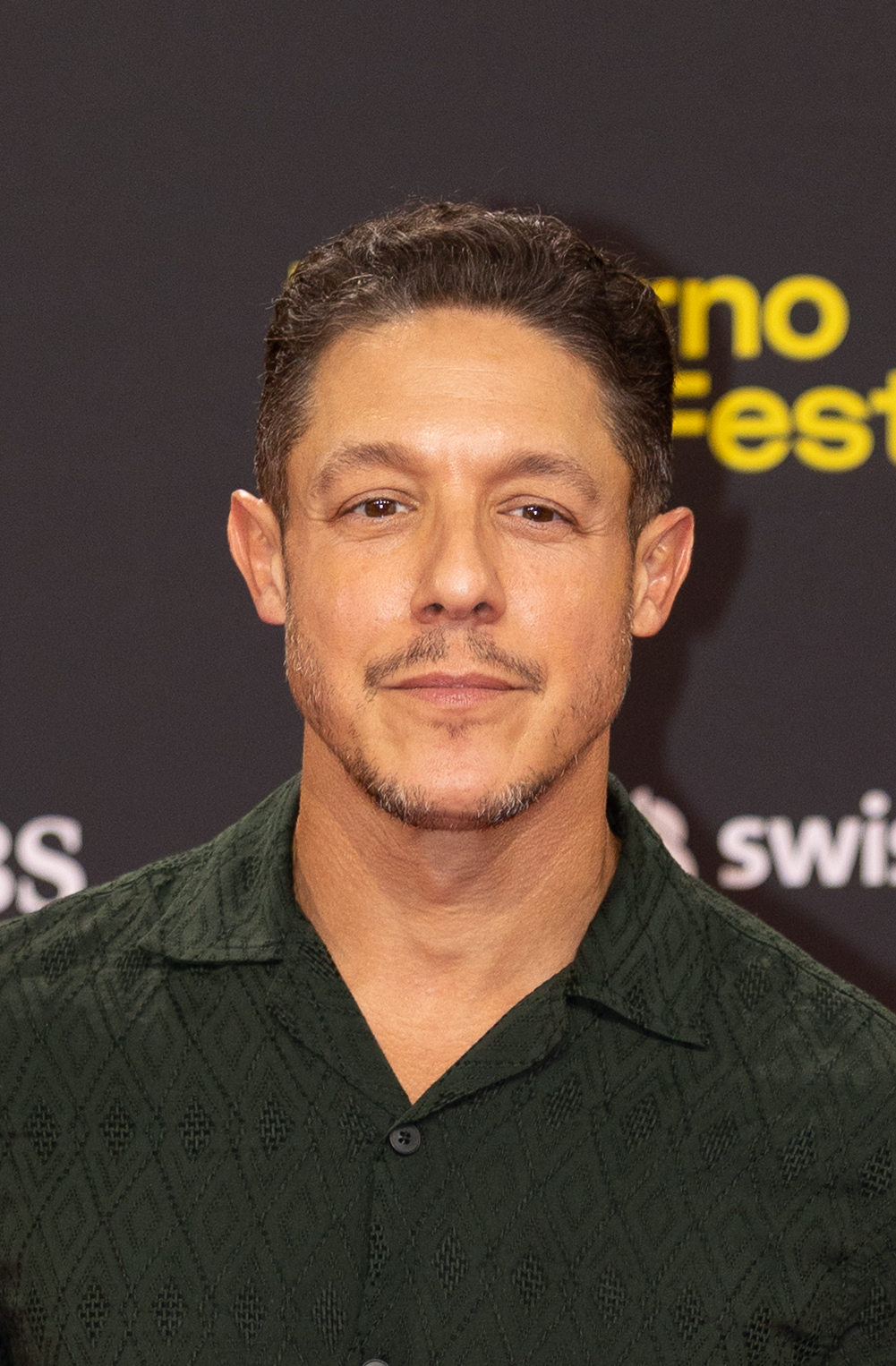
- Rossi in 2026
- Born: John Theodore Rossi; New York City, U.S.
- Education: University at Albany
- Occupations: Actor; producer; philanthropist
- Years active: 2001–present
- Spouse: Meghan McDermott (m. 2014)
- Children: 2

John Theodore Rossi is an American actor and producer. He portrayed Juan Carlos "Juice" Ortiz on the FX series Sons of Anarchy (2008–2014) and Hernan "Shades" Alvarez in Luke Cage (2016–2018). In 2024, he portrayed Dr. Julian Rush on the HBO series The Penguin (2024). His film roles include Tino Hull in Red Sands (2009), Todd in Bad Hurt (2015), Francisco "Ghost" Alvarez in Lowriders (2017), Deuce in Vault (2019), and Youcef in Emily the Criminal (2022), the latter of which earned him an Independent Spirit Award nomination.

== Early life ==
Rossi was born in Richmond, Staten Island, New York City, in the Oakwood neighborhood. He is of Italian, Spanish, Lebanese, and Syrian descent. Growing up, he loved to ride dirt bikes. He has openly admitted to dealing drugs for years before moving to California. He studied acting at the Lee Strasberg Theatre Institute in New York, where he appeared in several theatre productions.

== Career ==
Rossi played Juan Carlos "Juice" Ortiz on the FX series Sons of Anarchy. His production company, Dos Dudes Pictures, produced its first feature film in 2014, Bad Hurt, Rossi acting alongside Karen Allen and Michael Harney.

Rossi has appeared in television shows such as The Penguin, Law & Order: Special Victims Unit, Hawaii Five-O, Las Vegas, The Unit, Jericho, Bones, Without a Trace, Veronica Mars, NYPD Blue, CSI: Miami, Lie to Me and Lost. He has had recurring roles on Heist, American Dreams, and Terminator: The Sarah Connor Chronicles. His film credits include Cloverfield, Code Breakers, House of the Dead 2, Red Sands, The Informers, Kill Theory, Fencewalker and Meth Head.

He played Hernan "Shades" Alvarez in the Marvel Cinematic Universe series Luke Cage from 2016 until 2018.

In 2019, Rossi joined the Advisory Board of the Harlem Film House, which presents the Hip Hop Film Festival, an annual event that focuses on filmmakers from the global culture of hip hop, and promotes financial sustainability for independent filmmakers from marginalized communities.

== Philanthropy ==
Rossi gets involved with the men and women of the military, with fellow Sons of Anarchy actors Kim Coates, Dayton Callie and Ron Perlman. An ambassador to the Boot Campaign, Rossi works with multiple organizations that raise money for wounded soldiers and those returning with post-traumatic stress disorder (PTSD). Throughout the off-season, Rossi has often traveled to different bases to visit US military personnel. He has helped to organize the yearly Boot Ride event that benefits the Boot Campaign, giving fans a chance to spend a day riding with the Sons of Anarchy cast while raising money for U.S. military veterans.

Shortly after Hurricane Sandy hit Staten Island, Rossi, with friends and family, founded Staten Strong, a program administered by the Boot Campaign. Staten Strong rebuilt three homes for Hurricane Sandy victims on Staten Island.

He supports animal welfare and launched a campaign with the Humane Society of the United States to protect street dogs. He appeared in a PETA ad promoting pet adoption.

== Personal life ==
Rossi resides in Austin, Texas. He consumes a "mostly plant-based diet" and occasionally consumes eggs. He is married to Meghan McDermott. The couple's first child was born in 2015, and their second in 2017.

== Filmography ==
=== Film ===
Key
†	Denotes films that have not yet been released

Year	Title	Role	Notes
2001	The Myersons	Montilli	
2003	The Challenge	Anthony	
2004	Buds for Life	Teddy	
2005	House of the Dead 2	Greg Berlin	
2008	Cloverfield	Antonio	
2008	Kill Theory	Carlos	
2008	The Informers	Spaz	
2009	Red Sands	Pfc. Tino Hull	
2009	Space	Mike	Short film
2013	Meth Head	Carlos	
2016	Bad Hurt	Todd	Also producer; Sunscreen Film Festival West Award for Best Narrative Feature
2016	When the Bough Breaks	Mike Mitchell	
2017	Lowriders	Francisco “Ghost” Alvarez	Nominated – Imagen Award for Best Actor - Feature Film
2019	Vault	Deuce	
2019	American Skin	Officer Dominic Reyes	
2019	Rattlesnake	Billy	
2020	Ghosts of War	Kirk	
2021	Army of the Dead	Burt Cummings	
2022	Emily the Criminal	Youcef	Nominated – Independent Spirit Award for Best Supporting Performance
2022	Escape the Field	Tyler	
2022	Vendetta	Rory Fetter	
2022	Dear Zoe	Nick DeNunzio	
2023	Squealer	Danny D.	
2024	Bosco	Ramos	
2024	Carry-On	The Watcher	
2025	Play Dirty	Frank Grady	Also writer and executive producer
2025	Site	Garrison Vey	
2025	Salvation	Nick	
2026	The Saviors	Amir	
2026	Bruton	Bryan Bruton	
2026	Come With Me	Simon Ward	Post-production
TBA	The Underneath: In Fortune's Shadow †	Nate	Post-production
TBA	A Better Place †	EJ	Post-production
TBA	Young Blood †	The Vet	Post-production
TBA	Maid of Dishonor †	Rick	Post-production
TBA	Renew †	Randy	Post-production

=== Television ===
Year	Title	Role	Notes
2001–2002	Boston Public	Brandon Webber	2 episodes
2002	Big Shot: Confessions of a Campus Bookie	The Mook	Television film
2002	Malcolm in the Middle	Senior	Episode: "Humilithon"
2004	NYPD Blue	Pete Amici	Episode: "Chatty Chatty Bang Bang"
2004	Medical Investigation	Joe Vasquez	Episode: "Coming Home"
2004	American Dreams	Bobby Santos	2 episodes
2005	Blind Justice	Eric Fitzgerald	Episode: "Rub a Tub Tub"
2005	Veronica Mars	Norris Clayton	Episode: "Weapons of Class Destruction"
2005	Code Breakers	Desantis	Television film
2006	Jane Doe: Yes, I Remember It Well	Antonio Ruiz	Television film
2006	Without a Trace	Corey Williams	Episode: "Odds or Evens"
2006	Lost	Sgt. Buccelli	Episode: "One of Them"
2006	Heist	Vinny Momo	2 episodes
2006	The Unit	Mike	Episode: "Unannounced"
2006	Bones	Nick Arno	Episode: "The Woman in the Sand"
2006	Jericho	Randy Payton	2 episodes
2007	Nurses		Unsold Pilot
2007	Shark	Danny Vargas	Episode: "Here Comes the Judge"
2007	Las Vegas	Jason Scott	2 episodes
2007	Grey's Anatomy	Stan Giamatti	2 episodes
2008–2014	Sons of Anarchy	Juan Carlos "Juice" Ortiz	Main role; 85 episodes
2009	Terminator: The Sarah Connor Chronicles	Lieutenant Dietze	2 episodes
2009	CSI: Miami	Jimmy Castigan	Episode: "Dissolved"
2010	Lie To Me	Officer Tressler	Episode: "Teacher and Pupils"
2012	Hawaii Five-0	Sal Painter	Episode: "Mai Ka Wa Kahiko"
2012	Alcatraz	Sonny Burnett	2 episodes
2013	Law & Order: Special Victims Unit	Enrique Rodriguez	Episode: "Presumed Guilty"
2016–2018	Luke Cage	Hernan "Shades" Alvarez	Main role; 23 episodes
2021	True Story	Gene	6 episodes
2022	Star Wars: Tales of the Jedi	Senator Larik (voice)	Episode: "Choices"
2024	The Penguin	Dr. Julian Rush	6 episodes
