= The Good Life (2007 film) =

- Directed by: Steve Berra
- Written by: Steve Berra
- Produced by: Patrick Markey; Devin Sloane; Lance Sloane
- Starring: Mark Webber; Zooey Deschanel; Drea de Matteo; Harry Dean Stanton; Bill Paxton; Chris Klein; Patrick Fugit
- Cinematography: Patrice Lucien Cochet
- Edited by: Sean Hubbert
- Music by: Don Davis
- Distributed by: Epic Pictures Group; Image Entertainment
- Release date: January 20, 2007 (Sundance Film Festival)
- Running time: 90 minutes
- Countries: Canada; United States
- Language: English

The Good Life is a 2007 film written and directed by Stephen Berra, starring Mark Webber, Zooey Deschanel, Patrick Fugit, Bill Paxton, Drea de Matteo, Harry Dean Stanton, and Chris Klein.

== Plot ==
A movie about the travails of Jason (Mark Webber), a young gas station attendant and movie projectionist living in Nebraska. His encounters with various social difficulties and with Frances (Zooey Deschanel), a beautiful and enigmatic young woman, lead to dramatic changes and decisions in his life.

== Cast ==
- Mark Webber as Jason Prayer
- Zooey Deschanel as Frances
- Harry Dean Stanton as Gus
- Bill Paxton as Robbie
- Chris Klein as Tad Tokas
- Patrick Fugit as Andrew
- Drea de Matteo as Dana
- Bruce McGill as Frank Jones
- Donal Logue as Daryll

== Production ==
The Good Life was shot primarily in Canada in March 2006 on a budget of over 3 million dollars. The film was released on January 20, 2007.

== Reception ==
On the review aggregator website Rotten Tomatoes, 33% of 6 critics' reviews are positive.
