= Bad Hurt =

- Theatrical release poster
- Directed by: Mark Kemble
- Written by: Mark Kemble, Jamieson Stern
- Produced by: Theo Rossi; Nicholas Carmona; Emma Tillinger Koskoff
- Starring: Theo Rossi; Ashley Williams; Johnny Whitworth; Karen Allen; Michael Harney
- Music by: Tina DiGeorge
- Release dates: April 29, 2015 (Tribeca Film Festival); February 12, 2016
- Running time: 101 minutes
- Country: United States
- Language: English

Bad Hurt is a 2015 American film directed by Mark Kemble. It stars Theo Rossi, Karen Allen and Johnny Whitworth. The film is based on the play Badhurt on Cedar Street.

== Plot ==
Shortly before Christmas Day 1999, Todd drives a small bus on Staten Island, where he also lives. He is also a reserve police officer hoping to go to the police academy. His father Ed served in the Vietnam War and his mother Elaine must take care of two disabled children. DeeDee is developmentally disabled. Kent served in Iraq and is unable to do much, taking a lot of medication but given little help by the VA.

DeeDee and her disabled friend Willy work at a box factory. She is let go because of what they did together.

While driving his bus, Todd meets Jessie who is new in town and needs a job. Todd sees Kent trying to buy drugs and stops him.

One night Kent is having a hard time and Elaine takes him to the hospital. Todd, unaware of this, buys from the dealer and gives what he bought to Kent.

At Kent's funeral, Elaine gets upset because her son was not given a proper military ceremony.

After the funeral, Todd finds Ed at a baseball field and learns the full story of Ed's service in Vietnam. Ed made a mistake that got his entire unit killed. However, he refuses to listen when Todd tries to explain why Kent wasn't getting proper benefits or a military funeral. Ed will not let anyone say Kent did anything wrong.

Elaine takes Willy to a fast food place where Jessie works. She invites the family to a dance.

The family has Christmas dinner, but it is not without drama because of DeeDee and Willy.

Later, the family attends the dance, which is where DeeDee used to work. The family is refused entry until everyone sees how happy dancing with Willy makes DeeDee. Todd sees Jessie and meets her young daughter.

== Cast ==
- Theo Rossi as Todd Kendall
- Ashley Williams as Jessie
- Johnny Whitworth as Kent Kendall
- Iris Gilad as Dee Dee Kendall
- Calvin Dutton as Willy Crum
- Karen Allen as Elaine Kendall
- Michael Harney as Ed Kendall
- Dorothy Lyman as Mrs. Salisbury

== Reception ==
The film received 79% positive reviews at Rotten Tomatoes. In The Hollywood Reporter, Jordan Mintzer wrote that the film "marks a promising directorial debut from playwright Mark Kemble". Gary Goldstein of the Los Angeles Times found it "too airless and depressing".
