= Numb (2007 film) =

- Original poster
- Directed by: Harris Goldberg
- Written by: Harris Goldberg
- Produced by: Kirk Shaw
- Starring: Matthew Perry; Lynn Collins; Mary Steenburgen; Kevin Pollak
- Cinematography: Eric Steelberg
- Edited by: Jeff Wishengrad
- Music by: Ryan Shore
- Distributed by: Image Entertainment
- Release dates: April 30, 2007 (Tribeca Film Festival); April 18, 2008 (Canada)
- Running time: 93 minutes
- Country: United States
- Language: English

Numb is a 2007 American dark romantic comedy film starring Matthew Perry and written and directed by Harris Goldberg. According to an interview with Goldberg on a bonus feature of the DVD release, he was inspired to write the screenplay by his own experience battling depersonalization disorder and clinical depression.

== Plot ==
When modestly successful screenwriter Hudson Milbank descends into a strange mood in which he feels detached from the world around him and unable to connect with his surroundings, either physically or emotionally, he initially attributes it to a night of excessive cannabis use. His writing partner Tom is disturbed by the sudden change in Hudson's demeanor and urges him to seek psychiatric help.

Dr. Townsend diagnoses his condition as depersonalization disorder and prescribes various medications including Clonazepam, and when nothing seems to help Hudson consults Dr. Richmond, who also sees drugs, albeit divalproex sodium and others rather than Clonazepam, as the solution.

Hudson meets Sara, a beautiful young woman who finds him attractive and appealing and decides to introduce him to as many positive and compelling experiences as possible. Also trying to help him is yet another psychiatrist, Dr. Blaine, who initially resists his advances but ultimately has an affair with him before revealing she has serious issues of her own that require professional attention.

== Cast ==
- Matthew Perry as Hudson Milbank
- Lynn Collins as Sara Harrison, a film development executive
- Kevin Pollak as Tom
- Mary Steenburgen as Dr. Blaine
- Helen Shaver as Audrey Milbank, Hudson's mother
- William B. Davis as Peter Milbank, Hudson's father
- Brian George as Dr. Richmond
- Bob Gunton as Dr. Townsend
- Keegan Connor Tracy as Mt. Sinai Nurse

== Production ==
Although the film is set in Los Angeles, the film was shot on location in Vancouver and other locations in British Columbia's Lower Mainland, including Coquitlam, Port Coquitlam, Maple Ridge, Pitt Meadows, and Langley.

== Soundtrack ==
The film's original score was composed by Ryan Shore. The film's soundtrack includes songs by The Dandy Warhols, Ivy, Iron & Wine, Elliott Smith, Blondie, and Doves. The score was released on June 17, 2008, and features the following tracks:

1. "Numb" 1:48
2. "Sara" 2:25
3. "Childhood" 1:24
4. "Anti-Psychotic" 2:15
5. "Cafe" 0:50
6. "Chasing Sara" 2:36
7. "Hospital Testing" 0:55
8. "Winding the Watch" 1:49
9. "Dad" 0:58
10. "Jail" 1:55

Other songs featured in the film include:

- The Dandy Warhols – "Cool Scene"
- Ivy – "Edge of The Ocean (Duotone Mix)"
- Ryan Shore – "Libman"
- The Dandy Warhols – "Get Off"
- Ivy – "Thinking About You"
- Iron & Wine – "Naked as We Came"
- Ryan Shore – "Sally's Gift"
- Elliott Smith – "Say Yes"
- Iron & Wine – "Each Coming Night"
- The Doves – "Caught by the River"
- Blondie – "Rapture"
- The Dandy Warhols – "Bohemian Like You"
- The Dandy Warhols – "Godless"
- Elliott Smith – "Wouldn't Mama Be Proud"
- Ryan Shore – "Numb"
- Vibrolux – "Made in the Shade" (uncredited)
- Vibrolux – "I Need You" (uncredited)

== Release ==
The film premiered at the Tribeca Film Festival in 2007 and was shown at several other festivals, including Marché du Film, the Austin Film Festival, the Palm Springs International Film Festival, and the Sedona International Film Festival. It was given a limited theatrical release in Canada on April 18, 2008. The DVD was released in the US on May 13, 2008.

=== Critical response ===
The Hollywood Reporter wrote, "There’s an obvious personal resonance to Goldberg’s screenplay, but the film never fully succeeds in its attempted straddling of psychological drama and broad comedy. Whenever we start to become emotionally involved in the main character’s angst, the filmmaker throws in gags to provide comic relief. The result is neither as broadly funny nor as moving as it intends to be, and the tonal imbalance is ultimately disorienting." Wally Hammond of Time Out gave the film 3 out of 5 stars, writing that although the film starts to get repetitious and uncertain, "things liven up as Goldberg reverts to more conventional, romantic territory" and with the introduction of Collins' character.

== Accolades ==
Harris Goldberg won the Gen Art Chicago Audience Award at the Gen Art Film Festival, and Ryan Shore was honored for Outstanding Achievement in Film Music at the Park City International Music Festival. The film also won Best Feature at the Ojai International Film Festival.
