= Alex & the List =

2018 American romantic comedy film

Alex & The List
- Theatrical release poster
- Directed by: Harris Goldberg
- Written by: Harris Goldberg; Kristen D'Alessio
- Produced by: Kristen D'Alessio
- Starring: Jennifer Morrison; Patrick Fugit; Karen Gillan
- Cinematography: David McFarland
- Edited by: Richard Nord
- Music by: Ryan Shore
- Production companies: Goose's List; Signature Entertainment
- Distributed by: Gravitas Ventures
- Release date: May 4, 2018
- Running time: 111 minutes
- Country: United States
- Language: English

Alex & The List is a 2018 American romantic comedy film, directed by Harris Goldberg, from a screenplay by Goldberg and Kristen D'Alessio. It stars Jennifer Morrison, Patrick Fugit, and Karen Gillan.

The film was released on May 4, 2018, by Gravitas Ventures.

== Premise ==
Alex receives a list of all the things his girlfriend Katherine wants him to change about himself on their way to becoming the ideal couple. Although he instinctively rejects the suggestion that he needs to change anything, he decides to do so after noticing the looming threat of a new competitor.

== Cast ==
- Jennifer Morrison as Katherine Stern
- Patrick Fugit as Alex
- Karen Gillan as Lily
- Julie Gonzalo as Lara
- Eddie Kaye Thomas as Dave
- JoBeth Williams as Mrs. Stern
- Bob Gunton as Mr. Stern
- Michael Nouri as Rabbi Baskin
- Lesley-Anne Down as Victoria
- Gilles Marini as Dr. Antonio Rosenblatt
- Dana Powell as Holly
- Evan Arnold as Doctor
- Aaron Staton as Michael
- Victoria Tennant as Barbara

== Production ==
In May 2013, it was announced Jennifer Morrison, Patrick Fugit, Karen Gillan, Aaron Staton, Eddie Kaye Thomas, Giles Marini, JoBeth Williams, and Victoria Tennant, joined the cast of the film, with Harris Goldberg, directing from a screenplay written by himself and Kristen D'Alessio; the two would also produce the film, while Goose's List would produce and finance the film. Production began the same day.

== Release ==
The film was released on May 4, 2018, by Gravitas Ventures.

In April 2019, production company Signature Entertainment released the same film under the name Marriage Material on DVD.

== Critical reception ==
Brian Orndorf from Blu-ray.com gave the film a "D", and wrote "A moronic empowerment tale where the lead character is dumbed down to such a degree, it's almost difficult to believe he's capable of standing upright without falling over." Katie Walsh from Los Angeles Times wrote in her review "A great cast cannot save the dramatically inert and totally inept rom-com Alex & The List, which is short on both the rom and the com", and that the cast "just can’t get out from under the somnambulant, stereotypical sludge."
