= Noel Gugliemi =

American actor

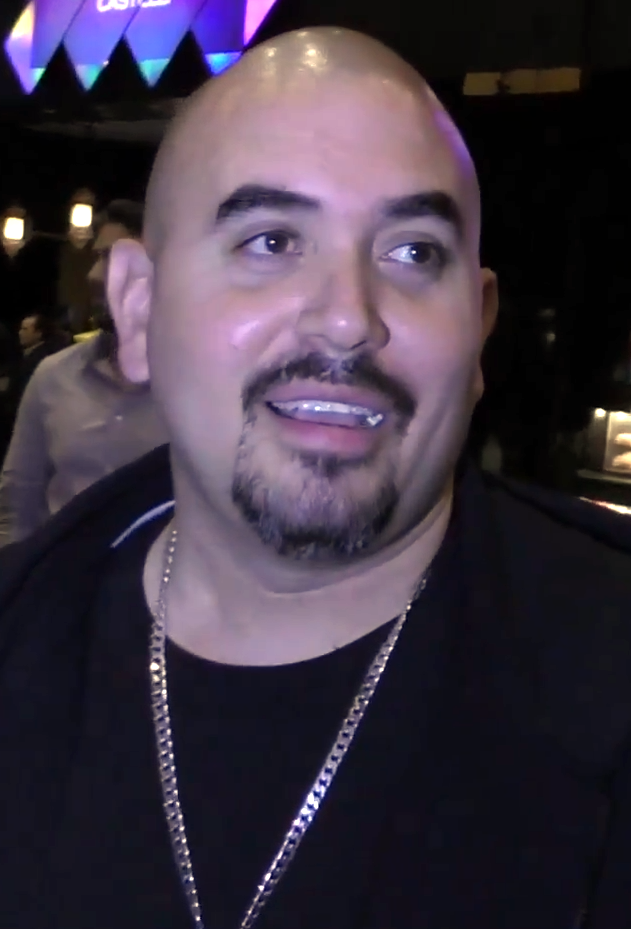
- Gugliemi in 2016
- Born: Noel Albert Gugliemi
- Other name: Noel Guglielmi
- Occupations: Actor, motivational speaker
- Years active: 1998–present

Noel Albert Gugliemi is an American character actor best known for his portrayals of Southern Californian gangsters. Gugliemi played Hector in The Fast and the Furious and Furious 7, and loosely reprised the role for other media. Since, Gugliemi has appeared in multiple films playing characters named Hector.

== Early life ==
Gugliemi is of Italian and Mexican descent. He was abandoned by his parents, and became homeless at age 13. Although not raised in poverty, he turned to gang life in his late teenage years. He has stated that he would "be dead or in jail" if he had not found acting as a career.

== Career ==
In 2001, at age 29, Gugliemi played Hector in The Fast and the Furious, which boosted his career. He reprised his role in Furious 7 and in the Fast & Furious music video, the latter alongside Chingy, iRome, Neil Brown Jr., Ray Lavender, Sarayah Love "Empire", and Chloe Riley.

== Personal life ==
Gugliemi is a Christian and began delivering motivational speeches at churches, schools and businesses in 2018. Although he often plays gangsters, Gugliemi discourages young people from involvement in such activity.

== Filmography ==
=== Film ===
| Year | Title | Role | Notes |
|---|---|---|---|
| 2000 | Price of Glory | Angel | |
| 2000 | The Dukes of Hazzard: Hazzard in Hollywood | Street Thug | TV movie |
| 2000 | Brother | Mexican Mafia Soldier | |
| 2001 | The Barrio Murders | Johnny | |
| 2001 | The Animal | Gang Leader | |
| 2001 | The Fast and the Furious | Hector | |
| 2001 | Training Day | Moreno | |
| 2001 | Ghetto Rhapsody | - | Video |
| 2001 | Road Dogz | Gangsta Thug | |
| 2003 | National Security | Latino Convict | |
| 2003 | Masked and Anonymous | Inmate #1 | |
| 2003 | Old School | Student #1 | |
| 2003 | Malibu's Most Wanted | Snuffy | |
| 2003 | Bruce Almighty | Hood | |
| 2003 | Double Blade (Shuang Dao) | Joker | Short |
| 2003 | S.W.A.T. | Latino Thug | |
| 2003 | Wasabi Tuna | Capone | |
| 2003 | El Matador | Bar Thug #2 | |
| 2003 | Wrong Turn | Manuel | Short |
| 2004 | Employee of the Month | Chicken | |
| 2004 | Party Animalz | Robert | Video |
| 2005 | Candy Paint | Paco | Short |
| 2005 | Duck | Lord of the Garbage | |
| 2005 | Harsh Times | Flaco | |
| 2005 | Hallowed | Noel | |
| 2006 | Seven Mummies | Santos | |
| 2006 | The Virgin of Juarez | Gio | |
| 2006 | Jack's Law | Diablo | |
| 2006 | Hood of Horror | Fatcap | |
| 2006 | Gangs of the Dead | Caesar | Video |
| 2006 | Splinter | Dusty | |
| 2006 | Crank | Warehouse Rooftop Hood | |
| 2006 | School for Scoundrels | Subway Guy | |
| 2007 | If I Had Known I Was a Genius | Angel | |
| 2007 | Get Pony Boy | Big Dino | |
| 2007 | Wannabes | G-Man | |
| 2007 | The Bucket List | Mechanic | |
| 2007 | Gordon Glass | Lalo | |
| 2008 | Loaded | Vinnie | |
| 2008 | Amhurst | Sam The Man | |
| 2008 | Street Kings | Quicks | |
| 2008 | The Ode | Cholo 2 | |
| 2008 | Hotel California | Chino | |
| 2008 | Evilution | Random | |
| 2008 | Darling Nikki: The Movie | Khan | |
| 2008 | Through the Valley | Mark Cotto | |
| 2009 | Trapped in 5150 | G | Video |
| 2009 | Red Sands | Pfc. Jorge Wardell | |
| 2009 | The Soloist | Winston Street Cop | |
| 2009 | Gamer | Upgrade Guard | |
| 2009 | Basement Jack | Detective Gene Anderson | Video |
| 2009 | Wrong Turn at Tahoe | Franky Tahoe | |
| 2010 | Our Family Wedding | Raymond Mata | |
| 2010 | April's Fools | Antonio | |
| 2010 | Getting High in the Barrio | Javier | |
| 2010 | Hostage: Criminal Implication | Gus | Video |
| 2010 | Food Stamps | Gus | |
| 2011 | Recoil | Rex Salgado | |
| 2011 | Platinum Illusions | Rubin | |
| 2011 | Fred 2: Night of the Living Fred | Delamar | TV movie |
| 2012 | Filly Brown | Big Cee | |
| 2012 | Small Apartments | Dog Walker | |
| 2012 | Kidnapped Souls | Detective Miller | |
| 2012 | For the Love of Money | Ramon | |
| 2012 | The Dark Knight Rises | Ex-Prisoner at River | |
| 2012 | Vi | Hector | Short |
| 2013 | Crosstown | Morales | |
| 2013 | Enter the Dangerous Mind | Detective Salinas | |
| 2013 | The Devil's in the Details | Guzzo | |
| 2013 | Hope Cafe | Hector | |
| 2013 | Criminal | Chief Barnes | Short |
| 2013 | Force of Execution | Salvator | |
| 2014 | Bullet | Punk #1 | |
| 2014 | Cruisin' | Officer Hernandez | |
| 2014 | Ready 2 Die | Ghost | |
| 2014 | Ricky & Melinda | Prison Boyfriend | |
| 2014 | Road Kill | Lewis | |
| 2014 | The Purge: Anarchy | Diego | |
| 2014 | Pretty Perfect | Eduardo | |
| 2014 | Respect | Tony | Video |
| 2014 | Total Praise | Det. John Azzi | TV movie |
| 2014 | Out of Sight | Gangbanger 1 | |
| 2014 | Kill Kapone | Crow | |
| 2015 | Furious 7 | Hector | |
| 2015 | Run | Raul | Short |
| 2015 | Ur in Analysis | Angel | TV movie |
| 2015 | The Bride He Bought Online | Javier | |
| 2015 | Secret in Their Eyes | Garbed-Out Fan | |
| 2015 | Bachelors | Detective Gonzalez | |
| 2016 | Pocket Listing | El Cabron | |
| 2016 | New Day | High School Teacher | Short |
| 2016 | Lowriders | Angel | |
| 2016 | Restored Me | Frank | |
| 2016 | The Void | Zane | Short |
| 2016 | Better Criminal | Cowboy | |
| 2016 | The Lincoln | Vince | |
| 2016 | Ditch Party | Lorenzo | |
| 2016 | Vigilante Diaries | Nero | |
| 2017 | Secrets of Deception | Chino | |
| 2017 | Varsity Punks | Coach Cruz | |
| 2017 | Pope | Big Daddy | |
| 2017 | The Fighters Prayer | Ali | |
| 2017 | Smartass | Jose | |
| 2017 | Hogan | Ali | |
| 2017 | Beyond Skyline | Justin | |
| 2017 | California Dreaming: Escape from Ensenada | Raul | |
| 2017 | Anabolic Life | Detective Ramirez | |
| 2018 | Memphis Fire | Shane | TV movie |
| 2018 | Fade Away | Flaco | |
| 2018 | A Boy Called Sailboat | José | |
| 2018 | Dragged Across Concrete | Vasquez | |
| 2018 | El Chicano | Silent | |
| 2018 | Mr. Malevolent | William | |
| 2018 | The Mule | Bald Rob | |
| 2019 | A Psycho's Path | Sergeant Torres | |
| 2019 | The Mustang | Roberto | |
| 2019 | Possession Diaries | Detective #1 | |
| 2019 | The Turnaround | Juan | Short |
| 2019 | 3 from Hell | Bullet | |
| 2019 | Seven Deadly Sins (alternate title: Charlie Charlie) | Uncle Juan | |
| 2019 | John Wynn's Mirror Mirror | Pastor Oscar Flores | |
| 2019 | Fire and Rain | Silver | |
| 2019 | Cabal | Landlord | Short |
| 2020 | The Tax Collector | Snoopy | |
| 2020 | The Lady of the Dead | Cisco | |
| 2020 | Terra Beach | Miguel Garcia | Short |
| 2021 | Under the Stadium Lights | Albert | |
| 2021 | Lazarus | Jupiter | |
| 2021 | American't | Johny | Short |
| 2021 | The Pizza Joint | Playa Playa | |
| 2021 | Narc | Hitman Mark | |
| 2021 | Welcome to Our World | Gus | |
| 2021 | Soul Pursuit | Brother | |
| 2021 | The Cleaner | Hector | |
| 2021 | Hustle Down | Diego | |
| 2021 | War of the Worlds: Annihilation | Tiago | |
| 2022 | Vampiras: The Brides | Diaz | |
| 2022 | Corsicana | Juan | |
| 2022 | 85 to Ajo | Mr. Guerra | |
| 2022 | Paradise City | Alfredo Salazar | |
| 2022 | Savage Salvation | Silas | |
| 2022 | Bleach | Police Chief Lopez | |
| 2023 | Bermuda Island | Diego Montalban | |
| 2023 | The Locksmith | Detective Perez | |
| 2023 | Breakout | Chavez | |
| 2023 | Tough Guy | Eddie | |
| 2023 | Bora | Big Homie | |
| 2023 | Necropolis | Bone Collector | |
| 2023 | Murder Motel | Paul | |
| 2024 | Texas Twister | Sam | |
| 2024 | Cash Out | Hector | |
| 2024 | Ray and Jae: Pitched Out | Hector | Short |
| 2024 | Cold Blooded | Alfonso | |
| 2024 | Seven Cemeteries | Hector | |
| 2024 | Rock | Hector | |
| 2025 | Catalyst | Kevin Lozano | |
| 2025 | High Rollers | Hector | |
| 2025 | Aimee Comes First | Uncle Hector | Short |
| 2025 | Last Known Backup | Miguel Garcia | |
| 2025 | Evil Nun | Father Hector | |
| 2025 | Time of Death | Hector Ramos | |

=== Television ===
| Year | Title | Role | Notes |
|---|---|---|---|
| 1999 | Get Real | Frank Ortez | Episode: "Pilot" |
| 2000 | Resurrection Blvd. | Gang Member/Lalo | Episode: "Pilot: Part 1" & "El Baile" |
| 2001 | The X-Files | Gangbanger #1 | Episode: "Surekill" |
| 2001 | Buffy the Vampire Slayer | Vince | Episode: "Life Serial" |
| 2001 | CSI: Crime Scene Investigation | David Ramirez | Episode: "Alter Boys" |
| 2002 | 24 | Craig | Episode: "6:00 p.m.-7:00 p.m." |
| 2002 | Without a Trace | Chico | Episode: "Pilot" |
| 2002 | Angel | Driver Vamp | Episode: "Deep Down" |
| 2002 | Robbery Homicide Division | Paco | Episode: "City of Strivers" |
| 2002 | Less than Perfect | Marco | Episode: "A Claude Casey Production" |
| 2003 | NYPD Blue | Jose Rincon | Episode: "Laughlin All the Way to the Clink" |
| 2003 | The Handler | Jose | Episode: "Street Boss" |
| 2004 | Monk | Man | Episode: "Mr. Monk and the Paperboy" |
| 2004 | The District | Dante | Episode: "Open Season" |
| 2004 | Cruzin TV | Himself/Host | Main Host |
| 2004–05 | The Shield | Savuto | Guest Cast: Season 3-4 |
| 2004–05 | The Young and the Restless | Satchel/Drug Dealer | Regular Cast |
| 2005 | CSI: Miami | Rico Dominguez | Episode: "Shootout" |
| 2005 | Sleeper Cell | Cesar | Episode: "Soldier" |
| 2005 | Wanted | Felix | Episode: "Judas" |
| 2006 | Las Vegas | Victor Castillo | Episode: "Bait and Switch" |
| 2009 | Dark Blue | Ramone | Episode: "Pilot" |
| 2009 | The League | Perp | Episode: "The Draft" |
| 2010 | The Cleveland Show | Lay-Z (voice) | Episode: "Our Gang" |
| 2010 | Look: The Series | Oscar | Recurring Cast |
| 2010 | The Walking Dead | Felipe | Episode: "Vatos" |
| 2012 | The Mentalist | Kevin Cintron | Episode: "The Crimson Hat" |
| 2013 | Chosen | Salmas Valverde | Recurring Cast: Season 1 |
| 2013 | Wendell & Vinnie | Todd | Episode: "First Dances & Last Chances" |
| 2013 | Between Bullets | Diego Salvador | Episode: "Simple Job" |
| 2014 | Legit | Ernesto | Episode: "Checkmate" |
| 2014-15 | Retail | Hector | Episode: "Second Chances" & "Mixed Emotions" |
| 2015 | Bones | Logan Manzes | Episode: "The Big Beef at the Royal Diner" |
| 2015 | Black Jesus | - | Episode: "Good for Nothing" |
| 2015-20 | Fresh Off the Boat | Hector | Recurring Cast: Season 1-4, Guest: Season 5-6 |
| 2017 | Training Day | Moreno | Recurring Cast |
| 2017 | Chicago P.D. | Chico | Episode: "Promise" |
| 2017 | Wisdom of the Crowd | Flaco Guerrero | Recurring Cast |
| 2018 | Nicky Jam: El Ganador | Stephen | Episode: "The Infiltrated" |
| 2018–23 | Mayans M.C. | Louie | Guest: Season 1-4, Recurring Cast: Season 5 |
| 2019 | Scrutiny | Anthony Gerardi | Episode: "Even Hustlers" & "Family" |
| 2020 | Deputy | Danny Flores | Episode: "Deputy Down" |
| 2020 | Gentefied | Alex | Episode: "Unemployed AF" |
| 2020 | Dawn of the Zombie Apocalypse | Doug | Episode: "Revelation" & "The Survivor Squad" |
| 2020 | GhettoBusters | Hector | Episode: "Things get Messy" |
| 2021-22 | Days of Our Lives | Jason Smith | Regular Cast |
| 2024 | Bookie | Julio | Episode: "Go to the Labia" |

=== Video Games ===
| Year | Title | Role | Notes |
|---|---|---|---|
| 2005 | 187 Ride or Die | Cortez (voice) | |

=== Music Videos ===
| Year | Song | Artist | Role |
|---|---|---|---|
| 1998 | "Pretty Fly (For a White Guy)" | The Offspring | Latin Guy on Bicycle |
| 1999 | "Guilty Conscience" | Eminem featuring Dr. Dre | Eddie |
| 2017 | "Who Is Carlos Slim?" | Ca$tro Staxx | Boss |
