= Dead Birds (2004 film) =

2004 film

- Promotional artwork
- Directed by: Alex Turner
- Written by: Simon Barrett
- Produced by: David Hillary; Timothy Peternel; Ash Shah
- Starring: Henry Thomas; Nicki Aycox; Isaiah Washington; Patrick Fugit; Michael Shannon
- Cinematography: Steve Yedlin
- Music by: Peter Lopez
- Production company: Silver Nitrate Pictures
- Distributed by: Sony Pictures Home Entertainment
- Release dates: September 13, 2004 (Toronto); March 15, 2005 (U.S.)
- Running time: 91 minutes
- Country: United States
- Language: English

Dead Birds is a 2004 American horror Western film directed by Alex Turner, and starring Henry Thomas, Nicki Aycox, Isaiah Washington, Patrick Fugit, and Michael Shannon. The film centers on a group of deserters turned bank robbers who come face-to-face with supernatural forces while hiding in an abandoned plantation after robbing a bank.

The film was given a limited re-release on February 5, 2010, at the NuArt Theatre in Los Angeles; and received mixed reviews from critics.

== Plot ==
William leads a group of Confederate deserters during the American Civil War, including Clyde, Joseph, and William's younger brother Sam. With the help of Todd, an escaped slave, and Annabelle, an army nurse, they stage a robbery at a bank holding a cache of Union gold coins, and multiple townsfolk are violently murdered by the group during the plundering.

Needing a place to rest for the night, the criminals set up camp in a plantation house owned by William's deceased uncle, Jeffery Hollister, overlooking an abandoned plantation. It is revealed that Jeffrey was killed due to a conflict of interest with William. En route through the fields, they find a strange scarecrow, which they believe is actually a crucified man, and shoot a strange deformed creature. It soon becomes obvious that the old house is not as empty as they thought. When Hollister's wife died from consumption, he attempted to bring her back by sacrificing his children, slaves, and any other living creature, hoping that black magic acquired from his slaves' native rites would return her to life. However, this simply allowed evil spirits to take over his victims, and these remain in the house, attacking all who dare enter. When the locals found out about his demonic practices, they, alongside his own nephew, crucified Hollister in his fields so he would suffer by the very curse he unleashed (he is the scarecrow the group found when they first arrived).

A storm is coming, so Joseph leads the horses into the barn. When he goes to the well for water, he is pulled in by one of the spirits. The others try to find him but fail.

The others also experience strange occurrences. While resting in the bedroom, Sam is haunted by the ghost of the farmer, who shows him what happened, and Todd witnesses the ghost of a slave being sacrificed in the basement. Clyde witnesses what appears to be Joseph stumbling about outside and goes to investigate. William and Annabelle, who are guarding the gold, wake up to find it gone and think Clyde took off with it. While William tries to track down Clyde, Sam is possessed by the farmer and shows Annabelle what happened. The ritual turned the farmer's family into demonic creatures similar to the one they killed when they first arrived. Sam dies soon afterward, and Annabelle tries to convince William to leave. Annabelle then realizes that Jeffrey deliberately lured them here to have them killed in revenge for his conflict with William. Todd also reunites with the pair and is also determined to leave.

When they reach the barn, they find the horses torn to pieces. Todd begins to hear and see things the other two cannot, and he tries to leave. William refuses to leave without the gold and, with Annabelle, goes back into the house to find Sam's body missing. In the field, a possessed Sam attacks Todd, throwing him into the air, where he vanishes. When William and Annabelle go into the fields as well, they find Clyde, now dead and possessed by one of the spirits, crucified like a scarecrow with his eyes and mouth sewn shut. As they try to flee, William accidentally shoots Annabelle, killing her instantly.

The next morning, William finally leaves Annabelle's corpse behind. He is attacked by their dog and tries to run away. When William clears the fields, he is shot by a group of Confederate soldiers. It is then revealed that William has also transformed into a demonic creature, and the soldiers mistook him for some deformed animal. Two of the soldiers discover two gold coins that William dropped and go to investigate the house. As they walk through the fields, they discover the corpse of another demonic creature, presumably that of Annabelle. They continue to the plantation house as the screen fades to black.

== Cast ==
- Henry Thomas as William
- Patrick Fugit as Sam
- Nicki Aycox as Annabelle
- Michael Shannon as Clyde
- Muse Watson as Father
- Mark Boone Junior as Joseph
- Isaiah Washington as Todd
- Harris Mann as Jeffy Hollister

== Release ==
Dead Birds screened at the 2004 Toronto International Film Festival. It was given a limited re-release on February 5, 2010, at the NuArt Theatre in Los Angeles.

=== Home media ===
The film was released on DVD by Columbia TriStar on March 15, 2005.

== Reception ==
On review aggregator Rotten Tomatoes, Dead Birds holds a score of 60%, based on 10 reviews, with an average score of 5.4/10. Jon Condit of Dread Central said of the film, "And wouldn't ya know it, this modestly budgeted period piece from newcomer Alex Turner dishes on the history (we're in the late-1800s for this one) as well as some heavy gore and otherworldly Lovecraftian heebie-jeebies for a mostly satisfying feast. That is, if you can withstand its unhurried storytelling pace these tales of America's yesteryear can't seem to shake (it ain't no Glory, I'll say that much)." Cam Lindsay of Exclaim! said, "The Wild Wild West isn't the norm for a horror film setting, but first-time director Turner and writer Simon Barrett have come up with a nice horror/western hybrid to make their little flick an extraordinary one."

Daniel W. Kelly of DVD Talk said, "Of course, the film follows some conventions of horror. There's a cornfield. There are demons and scary creatures. A group of people in a desolate location get offed one by one. But that's what we love about horror. The only other real issue is that while the ending is good conceptually, it could be considered sort of anticlimactic visually. Still, this film is worth the goose bumps it delivers throughout due to stylish camera work and a visually frightening presentation." Brian McKay from eFilmCritic.com gave the film 4/5 stars, writing, "Dead Birds is the kind of horror film that straddles the line between mediocrity and quality, ultimately landing on the "quality" side thanks to several elements that help to elevate it above its standard horror trappings. When you're making a basic haunted house tale, it's important to have a good cast and some prime real estate to shoot it on, two elements that are abundantly present here." Arrow in the Head rated the film 6/10, commending the film's acting, atmosphere, direction, and soundtrack, while criticizing the film's occasional slow moments and weak CGI.

Robert Koehler from Variety gave the film a negative review, criticizing the film's lack of scares, overly extended scenes, and repetitive visual effects, writing, "[the] Concept of transplanting horror genre tropes into the Civil War's bloody soil is about as inspired as the dull Dead Birds ever gets."
