= Michael Harney =

American actor

Michael J. Harney
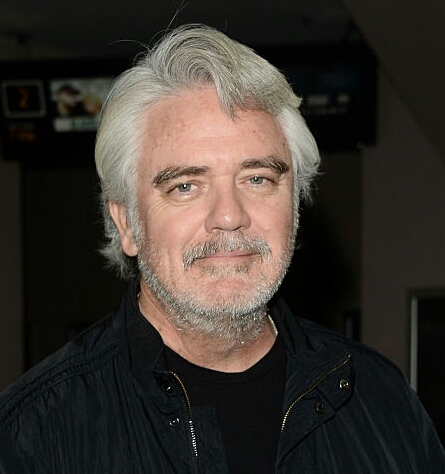
- Harney in 2016
- Born: Michael John Harney; New York City, U.S.
- Occupation: Actor
- Years active: 1992–present
- Children: 1

Michael John Harney is an American actor of film, television, and theater. He is known for starring on the Netflix original series Orange Is the New Black as Corrections Officer Sam Healy. In 2019, he had a recurring role in the Apple TV+ series For All Mankind.

== Early life ==
Michael John Harney was born in New York City.

During his time in New York City, Harney acted in and/or directed more than 80 plays.

== Career ==
Harney had roles in numerous blockbuster films such as Erin Brockovich and Ocean's Thirteen.

Harney first worked with Orange Is The New Black creator Jenji Kohan on the Showtime original dark comedy series Weeds, starring opposite Mary-Louise Parker as Detective Mitch Ouellette. He starred as Detective Mike Roberts in the police drama NYPD Blue and also in the HBO historical drama series Deadwood as Steve Fields.

In 2015, Harney returned to his film roots in the independent drama Bad Hurt, which had its world premiere at the 2015 Tribeca Film Festival.

== Personal life ==
He has one son.

== Filmography ==
=== Film ===
Year	Title	Role	Notes
1993	Italian Movie	Mike	
1997	Turbulence	U.S. Marshal Marty Douglas	
2000	Sonic Impact	Captain Mark Travis	
2000	Erin Brockovich	Pete Jensen	
2003	Shade	Micky Swift	
2007	Captivity	Detective Bettiger	
2007	Ocean's Thirteen	Blackjack Pit Boss	
2008	The Onion Movie	Line-Up Detective	
2010	Salvation Road	Douglas Moorland	Short film
2015	Bad Hurt	Ed Kendall	
2016	Soy Nero	Seymour	
2018	A Star Is Born	Wolfie	
2018	Widows	Sergeant Fuller	
2020	The Banker	Melvin Belli	
2022	88	Fred Fowlkes	
2023	The Iron Claw	Bill Mercer	
2024	Space Command Redemption	Anson Kemmer	
2025	One Spoon of Chocolate	Sheriff McLeoud	Post-production

=== Television ===
Year	Title	Role	Notes
1992	Law & Order	Detective Gullikson	Episode: "Trust"
1993–1999	NYPD Blue	Detective Mike Roberts	12 episodes
1994	L.A. Law	Howard Justin	Episode: "Whose San Andreas Fault Is It, Anyway?"
1994	Law & Order	Aaron Packard	Episode: "Old Friends"
1994	The Cosby Mysteries	Officer Mike Principe	Episode: "Self Defense"
1995	The Great Defender	Clark	Episode: "Twelve Angry Men"
1995	New York News	—N/a	Episode: "A Question of Truth"
1995	Space: Above and Beyond	Questioner	Episode: "Eyes"
1995	Dead by Sunset	Detective John Raines	Episode #1.2
1996	The Burning Zone	Mr. Davis	Episode: "Night Flight"
1996	Viper	—N/a	Episode: "Diamond in the Rough"
1996	Gone in the Night	Richard M. Daley	Television film
1997	The Practice	Assistant District Attorney Walt Frazier	Episode: "Trial and Error"
1997	Law & Order	Lieutenant Stu Miller	2 episodes
1997	The Pretender	U.S. Marshal Bob Garrison	Episode: "Unhappy Landings"
1997	Diagnosis Murder	Kurt Vaughn	Episode: "The Murder of Mark Sloan"
1997	Night Man	Mr. Krueger	Episode: "Pilot"
1997	Total Security	Charlie Kiplinger	Episode: "Pilot"
1997	The Visitor	Warden Burke	Episode: "Caged"
1997	NightMan		Television film
1998	Pensacola: Wings of Gold	FBI Agent #1	Episode: "Game, Set and Match"
1998	Star Trek: Deep Space Nine	Chadwick	Episode: "Honor Among Thieves"
1998	Chicago Hope	Chuck Lutsky	Episode: "Deliverance"
1998	Vengeance Unlimited	Officer Carl Witherspoon	Episode: "Justice"
1998	Brimstone	Detective Charlie Hirrsh	Episode: "Pilot"
1998	Touched by an Angel	Carl	Episode: "An Angel on the Roof"
1999	The '60s	Tom Gryzbowski	Television film
1999	Millennium Man	Lieutenant Colonel Brody	Television film
1999	Seven Days	Pierce Nolland	Episode: "Parkergeist"
1999	ER	Mr. Stehly	Episode: "Last Rites"
2000	Profiler	Mike Caldare	Episode: "Random Act"
2000	Walker, Texas Ranger	Bart Slocum	Episode: "The Bachelor Party"
2000	Buffy the Vampire Slayer	Xander's Father	Episode: "Restless"
2000	Bull	Frank Durski	Episode: "White Knight"
2000	Strong Medicine	Edward Duke	Episode: "Dependency"
2001	Nash Bridges	Jerry Stevens	Episode: "Bear Trap"
2001	Boston Public	Mr. Pierce	Episode: "Chapter Ten"
2001	The Fugitive	Detective DeVries	Episode: "Sea Change"
2001	The Invisible Man	Malachi Royce	Episode: "Father Figure"
2001	Warden of Red Rock	Henry Masters	Television film
2002	Crossing Jordan	John Morrissey	Episode: "One Twelve"
2002	JAG	Barman	2 episodes
2003	Tremors	Gene Fallon	Episode: "Ghost Dance"
2003	The Division	Bob Willets	Episode: "Acts of Betrayal"
2004	Cold Case	Charlie Rinzler	Episode: "Volunteers"
2005	Without a Trace	Detective Roberts	Episode: "Lone Star"
2005–2006	Deadwood	Steve Fields	12 episodes
2006	Vanished	Robert Rubia / Roberta Rubia	3 episodes
2007	Lincoln Heights	SWAT Commander	Episode: "Spree"
2007	Smith	Stu Binder	Episode: "Seven"
2007	The Unit	Crew Chief	Episode: "M.P.s"
2007	Life	John Garrity	2 episodes
2007	K-Ville	Burt Reynolds	Episode: "Flood, Wind, and Fire"
2007	Saving Grace	Jerry Carver	Episode: "It's Better When I Can See You"
2008	Criminal Minds	Pat Mannan	Episode: "3rd Life"
2008	Raising the Bar	Detective Robert Dougherty	2 episodes
2009	Numb3rs	U.S. Marshal	Episode: "Shadow Markets"
2009	Lie to Me	Elliot Greene	Episode: "Lack of Candor"
2010	Persons Unknown	Sam Edick	7 episodes
2010	NCIS: Los Angeles	LAPD Detective Frank Scarli	Episode: "Human Traffic"
2010–2011	The Defenders	Sergeant Smith	2 episodes
2011–2012	Weeds	Detective Mitch Ouellette	13 episodes
2012–2013	Vegas	Leo Farwood	3 episodes
2013	hIMPERFECT	Pop	Television film
2013–2016; 2018-2019	Orange Is the New Black	Sam Healy	Main role (seasons 1-4); Guest star (seasons 6-7); 43 episodes Satellite Award for Best Cast – Television Series; Screen Actors Guild Award for Outstanding Performance by an Ensemble in a Comedy Series (2015–16)
2014	True Detective	Steve Geraci	4 episodes
2015	Suits	Joe Henderson	2 episodes
2016	Chicago Med	Dr. Ron Unger	Episode: "Intervention"
2017	Lethal Weapon	Mike Ramos	Episode: "Unnecessary Roughness"
2017	Kevin (Probably) Saves the World	Karl Gilmore	Episode: "Listen Up"
2018	Unsolved	Lieutenant Paul Larson	5 episodes
2018	Midnight, Texas	Phillip Charity	Episode: "Drown the Sadness in Chardonnay"
2019	Splitting Up Together	Don Apple	2 episodes
2019–2020	Project Blue Book	General Hoyt Vandenberg	17 episodes
2019	For All Mankind	Jack Broadstreet	5 episodes
2020	Interrogation	Mr. Russell	3 episodes
2020	Deputy	William Hollister Sr.	4 episodes
2020–2021	Doom Patrol	R.J. Steele	2 episodes
2020	Space Command	Anson Kemmer	3 episodes
2021	Them	Otto Haber	Episode: "Day 6"
2021	Invasion	Patrick Mitchell	3 episodes
2022	FBI: Most Wanted	Ken Weldon	Episode: "Incendiary"
2023-	NCIS: Origins	Kowalski	Recurring
2024	Interior Chinatown	Chief Walden	
2025	The Better Sister	Doorman Arty	

=== Video games ===
Year	Title	Role	Notes
2011	Star Wars: The Old Republic	Darth Marr	
