= Deuce Bigalow: Male Gigolo =

1999 film directed by Mike Mitchell

- Theatrical release poster
- Directed by: Mike Mitchell
- Written by: Harris Goldberg; Rob Schneider
- Produced by: Barry Bernardi; Sid Ganis
- Starring: Rob Schneider; William Forsythe; Eddie Griffin; Arija Bareikis
- Cinematography: Peter Lyons Collister
- Edited by: George Bowers; Lawrence Jordan
- Music by: Teddy Castellucci
- Production companies: Touchstone Pictures; Happy Madison Productions; Out of the Blue... Entertainment
- Distributed by: Buena Vista Pictures Distribution
- Release date: December 10, 1999
- Running time: 88 minutes
- Country: United States
- Language: English
- Budget: $17 million
- Box office: $92.9 million

Deuce Bigalow: Male Gigolo is a 1999 American sex comedy film directed by Mike Mitchell (in his feature length directorial debut) and written by Harris Goldberg and Rob Schneider. The film, inspired by American Gigolo (1980), stars Schneider (in the title role), William Forsythe, Eddie Griffin, and Arija Bareikis, with supporting roles by Oded Fehr, Gail O'Grady, Richard Riehle, Jacqueline Obradors, Big Boy, Amy Poehler, and Dina Platias. The film tells the story of a hapless fishtank cleaner who goes into business as a male prostitute in an attempt to earn enough money to repair the damage he caused while house-sitting. It was the first film produced by Adam Sandler's production company Happy Madison Productions.

Deuce Bigalow: Male Gigolo was released in the United States on December 10, 1999, by Buena Vista Pictures through the Touchstone Pictures label. While the film received generally negative reviews from critics, it was a box office success, grossing over $92 million worldwide against a $17 million budget.

A sequel, titled Deuce Bigalow: European Gigolo, was released in August 2005 by Sony Pictures Releasing.

== Plot ==
Deuce Bigalow is a lonely and insecure aquarist living in Los Angeles. He meets a gigolo, Antoine, who asks Deuce to care for his sick lionfish and luxury beachfront apartment while he is away on business in Europe. Deuce accidentally sets Antoine's kitchen on fire and breaks his custom aquarium.

Fearing Antoine will kill him, Deuce is forced to find a way to pay $6,000 for the damage. After attempting gigolo work, Deuce is approached by a pimp, T.J., who offers to help him by recruiting him.

T.J. sets Deuce up on various dates: Fluisa, a mannish morbidly obese woman; narcoleptic Carol; Ruth, who has Tourette syndrome with coprolalia; and Tina, who is extremely tall. Each of Deuce's clients is satisfied by his attention and support, and he does not have sex with any of them. However, Deuce becomes enamored with Kate, who has a prosthetic leg. Deuce introduces Kate to his dad Bob who is a bathroom attendant. Initially embarrassed, Kate reassures Deuce and the pair fall in love. However, when she learns that Deuce is a gigolo, she breaks up with him.

Meanwhile, Deuce is stalked by police detective Chuck Fowler, who demands Antoine's black book of clients and threatens to arrest Deuce if he does not comply. Deuce learns Fowler's wife was one of Antoine's clients; he helps Fowler excite his wife when they perform an erotic dance for her. However, Deuce is still arrested for prostitution when he refuses to betray T.J.

In court, Deuce's clients testify and reveal that he never had sex with any of them; rather, he simply made them feel good about themselves. Deuce only had sex with Kate, and because he returned the money he was given to sleep with her, he is cleared of all charges. Deuce and Kate reconcile.

Learning that Antoine is returning home, Deuce and his friends work quickly to restore the damaged apartment; he is warned that the custom aquarium glass may not be installed properly. Kate's blind roommate Bergita accidentally kills the lionfish, so Deuce buys a replacement and returns to Antoine's just as he arrives. Antoine taps on the glass and it shatters. Deuce reveals his gigolo venture to the furious Antoine, who tries to kill Deuce using a medieval crossbow. Fluisa saves Deuce when the bolt hits a roast chicken she had hidden in her bra. Antoine is arrested by Fowler.

The postscript at a beach-side reception reveals the fates of the characters: Bob became a gigolo and earns $7.00. Ruth opened up an all-girls school for those with Tourette's. Carol fulfilled her dream of visiting the Eiffel Tower: "she will be missed". Fluisa underwent liposuction and became a Victoria's Secret model named Naomi. Antoine and Tina had tall and hairy children. T.J. starred in a hit sitcom called "Hanging with Mr. Man-Pimp". Deuce and Kate married and formed an anti-sushi movement, living happily ever after.

== Cast ==
- Rob Schneider as Deuce Bigalow, an insecure fishtank cleaner turned gigolo.
- William Forsythe as Detective Charles "Chuck" Fowler, an LAPD detective.
- Eddie Griffin as Tiberius Jefferson "T.J." Hicks, a crazy low-rent pimp and Deuce's friend.
- Arija Bareikis as Kate, a woman with a prosthetic leg, one of Deuce's clients and later his wife.
- Oded Fehr as Antoine Laconte, a famous gigolo from Argentina and Chuck's nemesis.
- Gail O'Grady as Claire, a woman who is Deuce's first client.
- Richard Riehle as Robert "Bob" Bigalow, a restroom attendant who is Deuce's dad.
- Jacqueline Obradors as Elaine Fowler, Chuck's wife.
- Big Boy as Fluisa aka Jabba, an obese woman weighing close to 750 pounds and one of Deuce's clients.
- Amy Poehler as Ruth, a woman who has Tourette syndrome with coprolalia and is one of Deuce's clients.
- Dina Platias as Bergita, Kate's blind roommate.
- Deborah Lemen as Carol, a woman with narcolepsy who is one of Deuce's clients and is seeking to go on a trip to France.
- Torsten Voges as Tina, a woman with a pituitary gland disorder whose face is never seen, as she is so tall her head disappears over the top of the frame. She is also one of Deuce's clients.
- Bree Turner as Allison
- Andrew Shaifer as Neil, a fish tank repairman.
- Allen Covert as Vic
- Elle King as a girl scout who Deuce buys cookies from
- Jackie Sandler as Sally
- Pilar Schneider as Old Lady at Restaurant
- Barry Cutler as Dr. Rosenblatt, a doctor who Kate works for
- John Harrington Bland as Dr. Rosenblatt's Patient
- Ron Soble as Judge Addison, a judge who presided over Deuce's trial
- Robb Skyler as the district attorney who prosecuted Deuce
- Norm Macdonald as the bartender who Deuce interacts with (uncredited). The postscript stated that Norm Macdonald only worked on this movie for one day.
- Adam Sandler as the voice of Robert Justin (uncredited), an offscreen passerby who insults Tina.
- Wes Takahashi as a sushi chef (uncredited)
- Marlo Thomas as Margaret (uncredited)

== Production ==
Deuce Bigalow: Male Gigolo was the first film released by the Happy Madison Productions film production company. Adam Sandler served as the film's executive producer. Sandler can be heard yelling the infamous "Freak!' line and other various lines in the background.

== Soundtrack ==
Deuce Bigalow: Male Gigolo

Soundtrack album by Various Artists
- Released: December 14, 1999
- Recorded: 1999
- Genre: Soundtrack
- Label: Hollywood Records

Professional ratings
Review scores
Source	Rating
AllMusic	3/5 stars

1. "Call Me" – Blondie
2. "Spill the Wine" – Eric Burdon and War
3. "You Sexy Thing" – Hot Chocolate
4. "Get Down Tonight" – KC and the Sunshine Band
5. "Let's Get It On" – Marvin Gaye
6. "I'm Not in Love" – 10cc
7. "Magnet and Steel" – Walter Egan
8. "No Worries" - Hepcat
9. "Can't Smile Without You" – Sean Beal
10. "Lift Me Up" – Jeff Lynne
11. "Call Me" – Emilia Maiello

== Release ==
=== Box office ===
Deuce Bigalow: Male Gigolo opened theatrically on December 10, 1999 in 2,154 venues and earned $12,224,016 in its opening weekend, ranking third in the North American box office behind Toy Story 2's fourth weekend and fellow newcomer The Green Mile. The film ended its run having grossed $65,538,755 in the United States and Canada, and $27,400,000 overseas for a worldwide total of $92,938,755. Based on a $17 million budget, the film was a box office success.

=== Critical reception ===
Deuce Bigalow: Male Gigolo received negative reviews from critics. On Rotten Tomatoes, it has an approval rating of 23% based on 75 reviews, with an average rating of 4.01/10. The site's consensus states: "According to critics, Deuce Bigalow is just too dumb and filled with old, tired gags." On Metacritic it has a score of 30 out of 100 based on reviews from 26 critics, indicating "generally unfavorable" reviews. Audiences surveyed by CinemaScore gave the film a grade B.

Roger Ebert of the Chicago Sun-Times gave the film one-and-a-half out of four stars, stating "It's the kind of picture those View n' Brew theaters were made for, as long as you don't View." Kendall Morgan from The Dallas Morning News writes in her review, "Deuce Bigalow: Male Gigolo makes There's Something About Mary look like Masterpiece Theatre."

== Sequel ==
In 2005, a sequel, Deuce Bigalow: European Gigolo, was released by Sony Pictures Releasing through their Columbia Pictures banner after Disney had declined to release it.
