= Isaiah Washington =

American actor (born 1963)

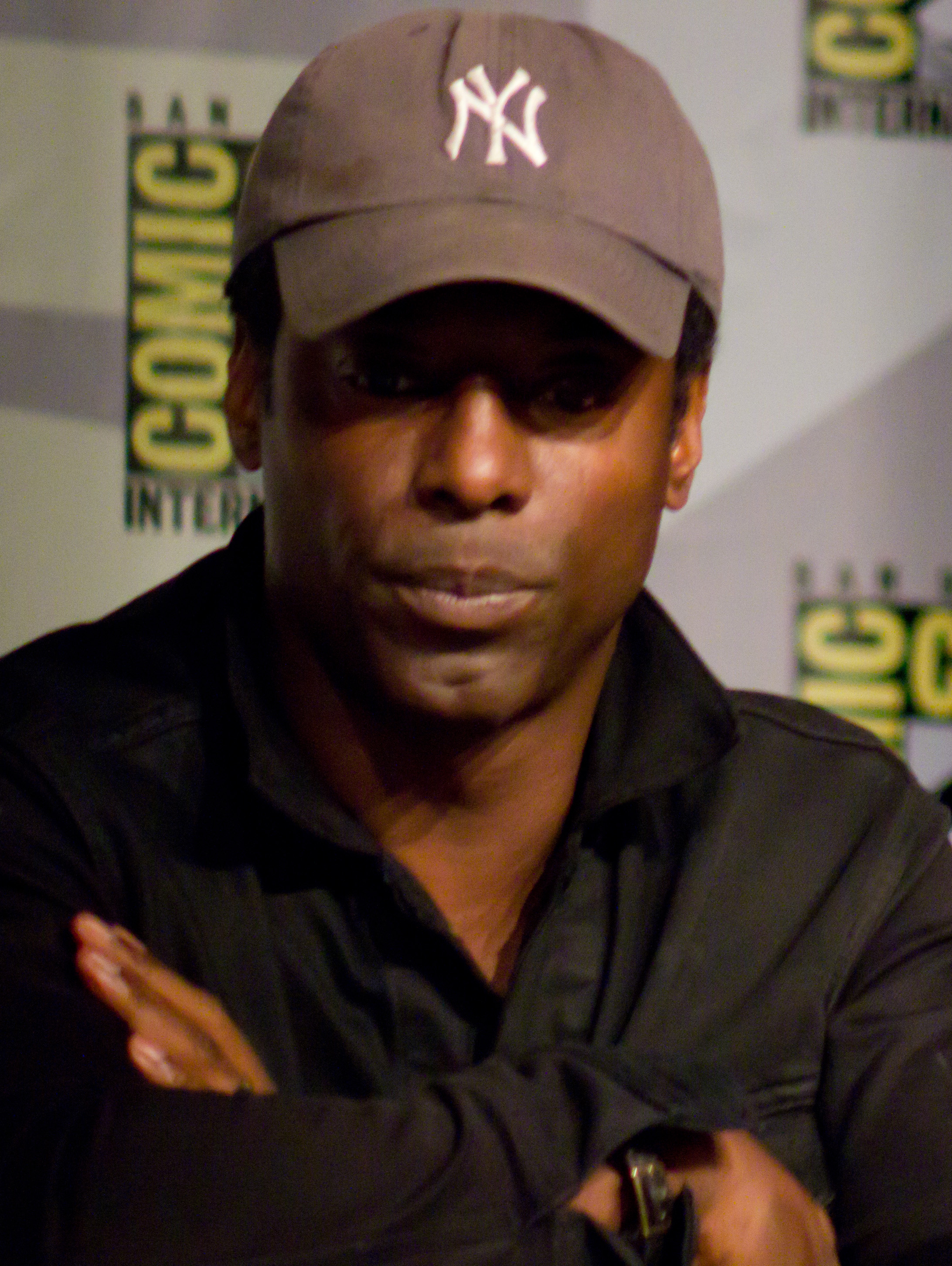
- Washington at the 2013 San Diego Comic-Con
- Born: Isaiah Washington IV; August 3, 1963 (age 63); Houston, Texas, U.S.
- Citizenship: United States; Sierra Leone
- Education: Howard University
- Occupations: Actor; film producer
- Years active: 1991–present
- Spouse: Jenisa Garland (m. 1996; died 2025)
- Children: 3

Isaiah Washington IV (born August 3, 1963) is an American actor. Following a series of film appearances, he came to prominence as Dr. Preston Burke in Grey's Anatomy (2005–2007; 2014).

Washington began his career collaborating with director Spike Lee on the films Crooklyn (1994), Clockers (1995), Girl 6 (1996), and Get on the Bus (1996). He also appeared in the films Love Jones (1997), Bulworth (1998), Out of Sight (1998), True Crime (1999), Romeo Must Die (2000), Exit Wounds (2001), Ghost Ship (2002), and Hollywood Homicide (2003). In 2005, Washington landed his breakthrough role as Preston Burke on Grey's Anatomy. He was dismissed after the third season due to his alleged usage of a homophobic slur while in an argument with Patrick Dempsey and allegedly referring to a cast member, T. R. Knight; he made a guest appearance in 2014. From 2014 to 2018, Washington portrayed Thelonious Jaha on The CW's science fiction television series The 100.

In 2020, Washington became the host of a travel cooking show on Fox Nation. In 2022, he made his directorial debut with the Western film Corsicana (2022).

== Early life ==
Washington was born on August 3, 1963, in Houston, Texas, where his parents were residents in the Houston Heights community. His parents moved to Missouri City, Texas around 1980, where he was one of the first graduates from Willowridge High School, Houston, in 1981. Washington revealed in an interview with Star Jones that his father, after whom he was named, was murdered when he was 13 years old. He joined the United States Air Force when he was 19 years old, where he worked on the Northrop T-38 Talon. His first assignment was at Clark Air Base in the Philippines followed by two years at Holloman Air Force Base in Alamogordo, New Mexico. After serving in the Air Force, he attended Howard University.

== Career ==
=== Early roles ===
Washington made his feature film debut in 1991's Strictly Business before engaging in a string of collaborations with director Spike Lee. Between 1994 and 1996, Washington appeared in Lee's films Crooklyn, Clockers, Girl 6, and Get on the Bus. He also had roles in the films Stonewall, Dead Presidents, Love Jones, Out of Sight, Bulworth, True Crime, Romeo Must Die, Exit Wounds, Hollywood Homicide, and Wild Things 2.

=== Grey's Anatomy ===
In 2005, Washington originated the role of gifted cardiothoracic surgeon Dr. Preston Burke on the ABC medical drama Grey's Anatomy. His portrayal earned him two NAACP Image Awards for Outstanding Actor in a Drama Series, as well as a Screen Actors Guild Award. He was paired onscreen with Sandra Oh, who plays intern Cristina Yang. Washington had originally auditioned for the role of Derek Shepherd, which ultimately went to Patrick Dempsey. Burke had originally been described as a nebbishy, stout forty-something man. For his portrayal of Burke, Isaiah was honored by TV Guide as one of "TV's Sexiest Men" in June 2006, and was named one of TV's sexiest doctors in June 2008 on TV Guide's television channel. Prior to the TV Guide honor, Isaiah was named as one of People's "50 Beautiful People" in May 2006. On March 6, 2014, ABC announced that Washington would be returning to the show in a guest appearance as Burke. He returned in season 10, which served as part of a farewell storyline for Sandra Oh's character, Cristina Yang. The characters had been previously engaged to be married.

==== Dismissal controversy ====
In the show's third season, Washington became a central figure in a widely reported backstage controversy. In October 2006, rumors surfaced that Washington allegedly insulted co-star T. R. Knight with a homophobic slur while arguing with Patrick Dempsey. Knight was not on the set at the time. Shortly after the details of the argument became public, Knight publicly disclosed that he was gay. There were rumors that Knight was going to be outed by the media. Washington issued a public apology for his "unfortunate use of words during the recent incident on-set".

While being interviewed on the red carpet at the Golden Globes in January 2007, Washington joked, "I love gay. I wanted to be gay. Please let me be gay". After the show won Best Drama, Washington, in response to press queries as to any conflicts backstage, said, "No, I did not call T.R. a faggot". However, in an interview with Ellen DeGeneres on The Ellen DeGeneres Show, Knight said that "everybody heard him".

After being rebuked by his studio, Touchstone Television (now ABC Studios), Washington issued a statement apologizing at length for using the epithet in an argument with Patrick Dempsey. On January 30, 2007, a source told People magazine that Washington was scheduled to return to the Grey's Anatomy set as early as that Thursday for the first time since entering "executive counseling" after making the comments at the Golden Globes.

However, on June 7, 2007, ABC announced it had decided not to renew Washington's contract, and that he would be dropped from the show. "I'm mad as hell and I'm not going to take it anymore," Washington said in a statement released by his publicist (borrowing the famous line from Network). In another report, Washington stated he was planning to "spend the summer pursuing charity work in Sierra Leone, work on an independent film and avoid worrying about the show". Washington, in late June 2007, began asserting that racism within the media was a factor in his firing from the series. On July 2, 2007, Washington appeared on Larry King Live on CNN, to present his side of the controversy. According to Washington, he never used the "F Word" in reference to Knight, but rather told Dempsey to stop treating him like a "F-word" during an argument "provoked" by Dempsey, who, he felt, was treating him like a "B-word", a "P-word", and the "F-word", which Washington said conveyed "somebody who is being weak and afraid to fight back". He also disputed the accusations made by Knight, who he claimed was misrepresenting himself out of disappointment over his character.

In July 2007, NBC cast Washington as a guest star in a story arc in its new series Bionic Woman. NBC co-chairman Ben Silverman noted his eagerness to work with Washington, saying it would be "like A-Rod leaving the Yankees in midseason". However, Bionic Woman was cancelled after only eight episodes due to low ratings. Washington himself said that his dismissal from Grey's Anatomy was an unfortunate misunderstanding that he was eager to move past. By the beginning of the next season of Grey's Anatomy, Washington's character "Burke" was written out of the show following the end of the season finale.

In January 2014, in an interview with I Am Entertainment magazine, Washington spoke about life after Grey's Anatomy and he stated, "I don't worry about whether or not the stories I tell will destroy my acting career, because you can't take away something that doesn't exist. They killed the actor [in me] on June 7, 2007."

=== 2014–present ===
Washington played the role of Chancellor Jaha in The 100, an American post-apocalyptic drama television series that began airing on The CW Television Network in spring 2014. The series is based on a book of the same name by Kass Morgan, and developed by Jason Rothenberg. Washington's character was killed in the second episode of the show's fifth season, "Red Queen".

Washington also starred in the film Blue Caprice, which was inspired by the 2002 D.C. sniper attacks. Washington portrayed perpetrator John Allen Muhammad, with Tequan Richmond playing Muhammed's accomplice Lee Boyd Malvo. The film was released in theaters on September 13, 2013.

Washington began hosting a travel and cooking show Isaiah Washington: Kitchen Talk on Fox Nation, the streaming service arm of the Fox conglomerate, in 2020.

In 2022, Washington made his directorial debut with the film Corsicana, which he also co-wrote and starred in.

== Personal life ==
Washington endorsed Jill Stein for President of the United States in 2016, but has since become a member of the #WalkAway movement.

In 2019, Washington expressed political alignment with the Republican Party.

=== Genealogical inquiry ===
Washington is of African descent. He has written a book called A Man from Another Land, which chronicles Washington's early life, his TV and film career, and his search to find his roots after going through a DNA test that showed his ancestors came from Sierra Leone in West Africa. A genealogical DNA test conducted by African Ancestry, Inc. revealed that Washington's maternal ancestry can be traced to what is now Sierra Leone, and that he has an ancestral link to the Mende and Temne peoples there. Since learning about his history, Washington has traveled to Sierra Leone, donated medical supplies to a hospital there, and built a school. He traveled to Sierra Leone in May 2006 marking the beginning of his charity work and was granted Sierra Leonean citizenship, making him the first African American to be granted full citizenship based on DNA. He has also been vested with a chieftaincy title of the Mende people in appreciation for his work in the country, taking the regnal name of Gondobay Manga II. His paternal ancestry also links him to the Mbundu people, an ethnic group in Angola.

== Filmography ==
=== Film ===
Year	Title	Role	Notes
1991	Land Where My Fathers Died	Malcolm	Short subject
1991	Strictly Business	Hustler	
1991	The Color of Love	-	
1993	Strapped	Willie	TV movie
1994	Crooklyn	Vic	
1994	Alma's Rainbow	Miles	
1995	Stonewall	Uniformed Cop	
1995	Clockers	Victor Dunham	
1995	Dead Presidents	Andrew Curtis	
1996	Girl 6	Shoplifter	
1996	Mr. and Mrs. Loving	Blue	TV movie
1996	Soul of the Game	Adult Willie Mays	TV movie
1996	Get on the Bus	Kyle	
1997	Love Jones	Savon Garrison	
1997	Joe Torre: Curveballs Along the Way	Dwight Gooden	TV movie
1997	The Player	-	TV movie
1998	Always Outnumbered	Wilfred	TV movie
1998	Mixing Nia	Lewis	
1998	Bulworth	Darnell	
1998	Rituals	Wendal	Short subject
1998	Out of Sight	Kenneth Miller	
1999	True Crime	Frank Louis Beechum	
1999	A Texas Funeral	Walter	
2000	Dancing in September	George Washington	
2000	Romeo Must Die	Mac	
2000	Kin	Stone	
2000	Veil	Bentley	Short subject
2001	Exit Wounds	George Clark	
2001	Tara	Max	
2001	Sacred Is the Flesh	Roland	
2002	Welcome to Collinwood	Leon	
2002	Ghost Ship	Greer	
2003	Hollywood Homicide	Antoine Sartain	
2003	This Girl's Life	Shane	
2004	Dead Birds	Todd	
2004	Trois: The Escort	Bernard 'Benny' Grier	
2005	The Moguls	Homer	
2008	The Least of These	Father Andre James	
2009	Hurricane Season	Coach Buddy Simmons	
2011	Area Q	Thomas Mathews	
2012	David E. Talbert's Suddenly Single	Sylvester Stone Sr.	
2012	The Undershepherd	L.C.	
2013	Blue Caprice	John Allen Muhammad	
2013	Doctor Bello	Dr. Michael Durant	
2013	Go for Sisters	Vernell	
2013	They Die by Dawn	Ben Hodges	
2013	The Trials of Cate McCall	Wilson George	
2013	Not 4 Sale	Sidney Poitier	Short subject
2014	Blackbird	Lance Rousseau	
2014	Vice Versa	Dr. Jack	Short subject
2015	The Sin Seer	Grant Summit	
2016	Secret Summer	Gus	TV movie
2017	Dead Trigger	Rockstock	
2018	Behind the Movement	E.D. Nixon	TV movie
2019	Keys to the City	August King	
2020	Cut Throat City	Sinclair Stewart	
2020	Trump Card	Himself	Documentary
2021	God's Not Dead: We the People	Rep. Daryl Smith	
2022	James the Second	Dr. Ramesh	
2022	Corsicana	Bass Reeves	Also director, writer and executive producer
2024	God's Not Dead: In God We Trust	Rep. Daryl Smith	
2026	Oscar Shaw	Ernie	

=== Television ===
Year	Title	Role	Notes
1991	Law & Order	Derek Hardy	Episode: "Out of Control"
1992	Loving	Dr. Ron Turner	Regular Cast
1994	Homicide: Life on the Street	Lane Staley	Episode: "Black and Blue"
1994	Lifestories: Families in Crisis	O.G.	Episode: "POWER: The Eddie Matos Story"
1995	NYPD Blue	Antonio Boston	Episode: "E.R."
1996	New York Undercover	Andre Morgan	Recurring cast: season 2
1996	Living Single	Dr. Charles Roberts	Recurring cast: season 4
1997	High Incident	Rulon "RuDog" Douglas	Episode: "Remote Control"
1998	Ally McBeal	Michael Rivers	Episode: "The Inmates" & "Being There"
2000	Soul Food	Miles Jenkins	Recurring cast: season 1
2001	Touched by an Angel	Rev. Austin Davis	Episode: "A Death in the Family"
2001	All My Children	Police Officer	Episode: "Episode #1.8125"
2004	Wild Things 2	Terence Bridge	Television film
2005–07, 2014	Grey's Anatomy	Dr. Preston Burke	Main cast: season 1-3, guest: season 10
2007	Bionic Woman	Antonio Pope	Recurring cast
2008	The Cleaner	Keith Bowen	Episode: "The Eleventh Hour"
2011	Law & Order: LA	Roland Davidson	Episode: "Carthay Circle"
2011	Single Ladies	Noland	Episode: "Confidence Games"
2014–18	The 100	Thelonious Jaha	Main cast: season 1-5
2017	Blue Bloods	Chief Travis Jackson	Episode: "A Deep Blue Goodbye"
2017	Bull	Jules Caffrey	Episode: "Bring It On"
2017	Survivor's Remorse	Rodney Barker	Recurring cast: season 4
2019	Tales	Malcolm	Episode: "Brothers"
2020	Isaiah Washington: Kitchen Talk	Himself	Host
2020–22	P-Valley	Mayor Tydell Ruffin	Recurring cast: season 1, guest: season 2

== Awards and nominations ==
Year	Award	Category	Nominated work	Result
2002	NAACP Image Awards	NAACP Image Award for Outstanding Actor in a Television Movie, Mini-Series or Dramatic Special	Dancing in September	Nominated
2006	NAACP Image Awards	NAACP Image Award for Outstanding Actor in a Drama Series	Grey's Anatomy	Won
2006	Satellite Awards	Satellite Award for Best Cast – Television Series	Grey's Anatomy	Won
2006	Screen Actors Guild Awards	Screen Actors Guild Award for Outstanding Performance by an Ensemble in a Drama Series	Grey's Anatomy	Won
2006	Monte-Carlo Television Festival	Golden Nymph Award for Outstanding Actor in a Drama Series	Grey's Anatomy	Nominated
2007	NAACP Image Awards	NAACP Image Award for Outstanding Actor in a Drama Series	Grey's Anatomy	Won
2007	Screen Actors Guild Awards	Screen Actors Guild Award for Outstanding Performance by an Ensemble in a Drama Series	Grey's Anatomy	Nominated
2014	Black Reel Awards	Black Reel Award for Outstanding Actor	Blue Caprice	Nominated
2014	Gotham Awards	Gotham Independent Award for Best Actor	Blue Caprice	Nominated
