= Patrick Fugit =

American actor (born 1982)

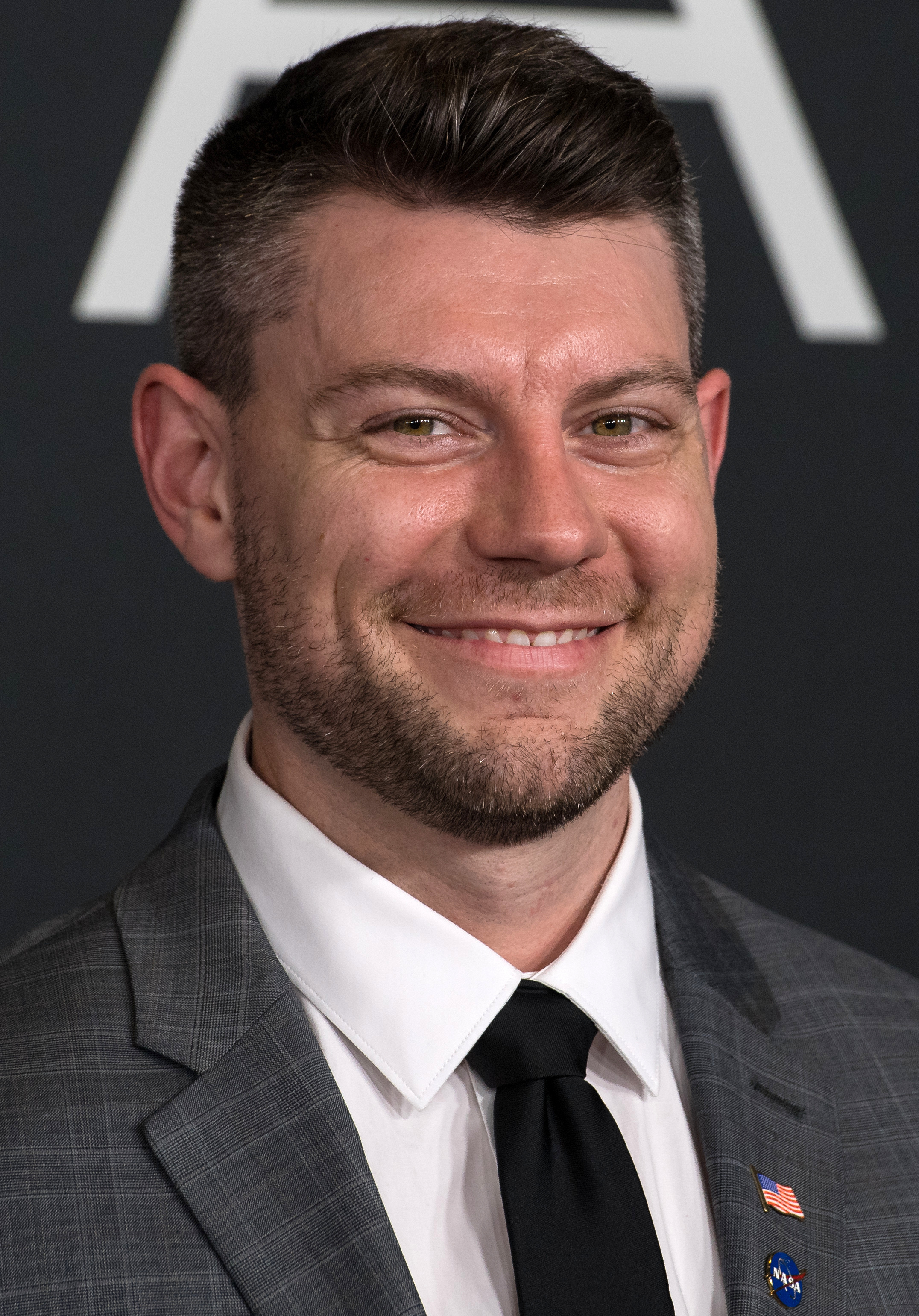
- Fugit in 2018
- Born: Patrick Raymond Fugit; October 27, 1982 (age 43); Salt Lake City, Utah, U.S.
- Occupation: Actor
- Years active: 1997–present
- Children: 1

Patrick Raymond Fugit (/ˈfjuːɡɪt/; born October 27, 1982) is an American actor. His breakout role was William Miller in the comedy-drama film Almost Famous (2000), which earned him a Screen Actors Guild Award nomination.

Fugit has also had starring roles in the films Spun (2002), White Oleander (2002), Saved! (2004), Wristcutters: A Love Story (2006), Cirque du Freak: The Vampire's Assistant (2009), We Bought a Zoo (2011), and Thanks for Sharing (2012). He had supporting roles in Gone Girl (2014) and First Man (2018). Fugit had the lead role in the psychological horror film My Heart Can't Beat Unless You Tell It To (2020), which he also produced.

Fugit played the lead role of Kyle Barnes on the Cinemax horror series Outcast (2016–2018). He also had a main role as Pat Montgomery on the HBO Max miniseries Love & Death (2023).

Fugit performed the role of Owen Moore in the 2020 video game The Last of Us Part II.

== Early life ==
Fugit was born in Salt Lake City, Utah, and lived briefly in Danbury, New Hampshire. His mother, Jan Clark-Fugit, is a dance teacher, and his father, Bruce Fugit, is an electrical engineer. Fugit has been a skateboarder since he was fifteen.

== Career ==
Fugit's career launched when he was cast as the young rock-fan-turned-reporter in Cameron Crowe's Almost Famous. Fugit said that he did not have any knowledge of 1970s rock music before starting the music-laden project.

Fugit played an aspiring comic book artist in White Oleander (2002) and a naive drug addict in the dark comedy Spun (2003).

His next film, Saved! (2004), was a satirical look at the religious right in high schools. Fugit's character was originally a surfer, but it changed into a skateboarder due to his skateboarding experience.

Fugit starred in The Amateurs and played Evra Von in Cirque du Freak: The Vampire's Assistant (2009).

In 2011, Fugit was cast in We Bought A Zoo, another Cameron Crowe film.

In 2016, he joined the cast of Cinemax's television series Outcast. He stated he enjoyed playing a father but worried that not being one in real life at the time might make him seem awkward.

In 2020, Fugit was cast in a lead role on ABC's pilot for Thirtysomething(else), a sequel to Thirtysomething; however, the pilot was scrapped by ABC later that same year.

== Personal life ==
Fugit and his best friend, David Fetzer, formed a folk rock band, Mushman, in which Fugit played the guitar and sometimes sang. Fetzer died in 2012. Fugit studies flamenco guitar, which he played on the Cavedoll song "Mayday" and the Mushman song "Brennan's Theme" for the ending scene in Wristcutters: A Love Story.

Growing up in Salt Lake City, Fugit says he was "the weird kid" in school because he learned ballet as his mother was a ballet teacher and because he was not Mormon but attended a predominantly Mormon school.

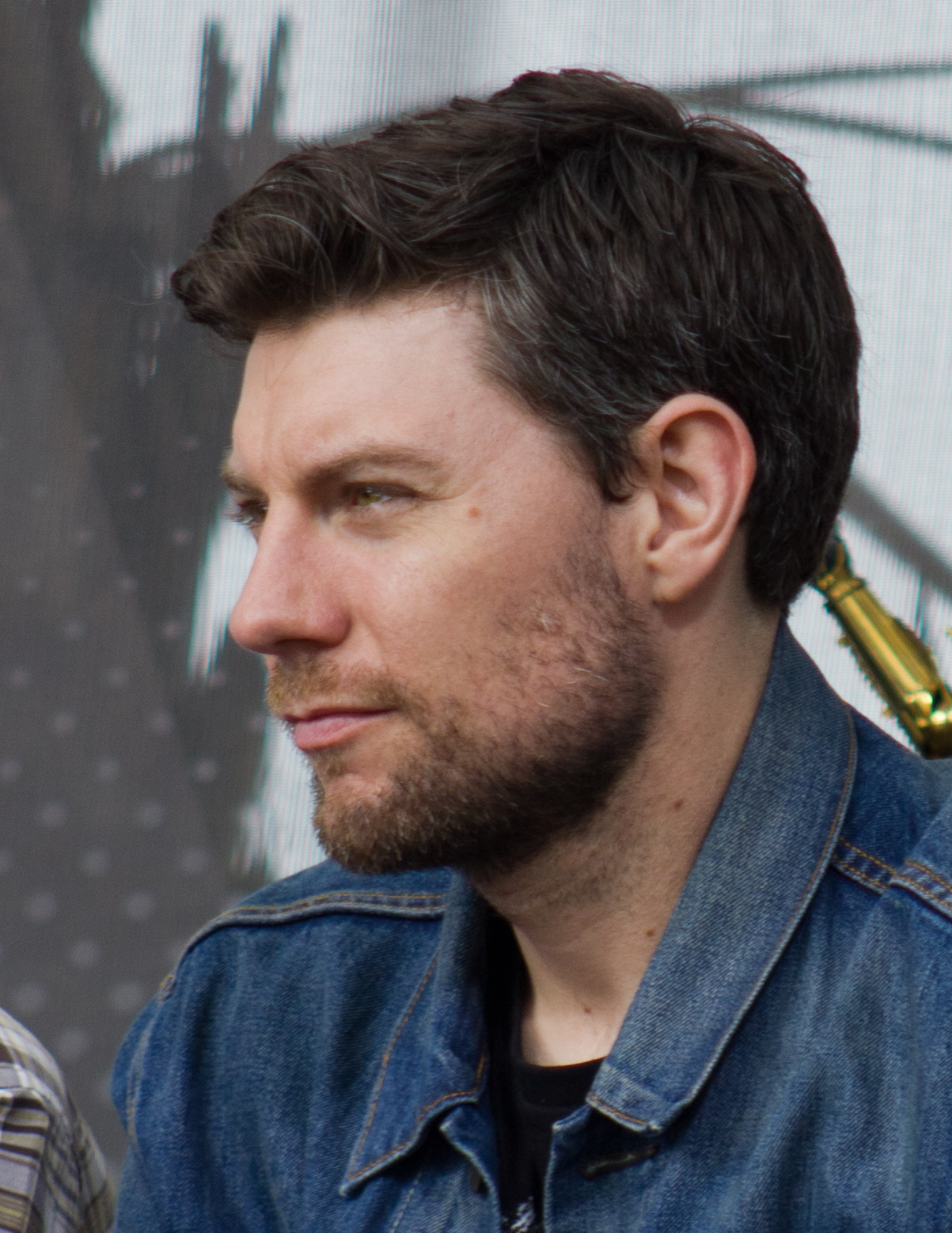
Fugit in 2016

Fugit has a child with his long-term partner, actress Jennifer Del Rosario.

== Filmography ==
=== Film ===
Year	Title	Role	Notes
2000	Almost Famous	William Miller	
2002	Spun	Frisbee	
2002	White Oleander	Paul Trout	
2004	Saved!	Patrick Wheeler	
2004	Dead Birds	Sam	
2005	The Amateurs	Emmett Orwin	Alternative title: The Moguls
2006	Wristcutters: A Love Story	Zia	
2006	Bickford Shmeckler's Cool Ideas	Bickford Shmeckler	
2007	The Good Life	Andrew	
2009	Horsemen	Cory	
2009	Cirque du Freak: The Vampire's Assistant	Evra the Snake Boy	
2011	We Bought a Zoo	Robin Jones	
2012	Thanks for Sharing	Danny	
2013	Reckless	David Harrison	
2014	Gone Girl	James Gilpin	
2015	Queen of Earth	Rich	
2018	Alex & The List	Alex	
2018	First Man	Elliot See	
2019	Robert the Bruce	Will	
2020	My Heart Can't Beat Unless You Tell It To	Dwight	Also producer
2022	Babylon	Officer Elwood	

=== Television ===
Year	Title	Role	Notes
1997–1998	Touched by an Angel	Boy #1 / Joey	2 episodes
1998	Legion of Fire: Killer Ants!	Scott Blount	Television film
2001	MADtv	William Miller	Episode: 6.19
2003	ER	Sean Simmons	3 episodes
2005	Everything You Want	Customer	Television film Also known as Love Surreal
2006	House	Jack Walters	Episode: "Whac-A-Mole"
2011	Cinema Verite	Alan Raymond	Television film
2016–2018	Outcast	Kyle Barnes	Main role
2019	Treadstone	Stephen Haynes	Recurring role
2023	Love & Death	Pat Montgomery	Main role

=== Video games ===
Year	Title	Role	Notes
2020	The Last of Us Part II	Owen Moore (voice)	Also motion capture

== Awards and nominations ==
Accolades
Year	Award	Category	Nominated work	Result	Ref.
2000	Hollywood Women's Press Club	Golden Apple Award for Male Discovery of the Year	Almost Famous	Won	
2001	Blockbuster Entertainment Awards	Favorite Male – Newcomer	Almost Famous	Nominated	
2001	Chicago Film Critics Association Awards	Most Promising Actor	Almost Famous	Won	
2001	MTV Movie & TV Awards	Breakthrough Male Performance	Almost Famous	Nominated	
2001	Online Film Critics Society Awards	Best Breakthrough Performance	Almost Famous	Nominated	
2001	Online Film Critics Society Awards	Best Ensemble	Almost Famous	Won	
2001	Screen Actors Guild Awards	Outstanding Performance by a Cast in a Motion Picture	Almost Famous	Nominated	
2001	Teen Choice Awards	Choice Breakout Film Performance	Almost Famous	Nominated	
2001	Young Artist Awards	Best Performance in a Feature Film – Leading Young Actor	Almost Famous	Nominated	
2015	Georgia Film Critics Association Awards	Best Ensemble	Gone Girl	Nominated	
2017	Fangoria Chainsaw Awards	Best TV Actor	Outcast	Nominated	
