= 62nd Academy Awards =

- Official poster
- Date: March 26, 1990
- Site: Dorothy Chandler Pavilion; Los Angeles, California, U.S.
- Hosted by: Billy Crystal
- Produced by: Gil Cates
- Directed by: Jeff Margolis

Highlights
- Best Picture: Driving Miss Daisy
- Most awards: Driving Miss Daisy (4)
- Most nominations: Driving Miss Daisy (9)

TV in the United States
- Network: ABC
- Duration: 3 hours, 37 minutes
- Ratings: 40.24 million 27.82% (Nielsen ratings)

The 62nd Academy Awards ceremony, presented by the Academy of Motion Picture Arts and Sciences (AMPAS), honored the best films of 1989 and took place on March 26, 1990, at the Dorothy Chandler Pavilion in Los Angeles beginning at 6:00 p.m. PST / 9:00 p.m. EST. During the ceremony, AMPAS presented Academy Awards (commonly referred to as Oscars) in 23 categories. The ceremony, televised in the United States by ABC, was produced by Gil Cates and directed by Jeff Margolis. Actor Billy Crystal hosted the show for the first time. Three weeks earlier, in a ceremony held at The Beverly Hilton in Beverly Hills, California on March 3, the Academy Awards for Technical Achievement were presented by hosts Richard Dysart and Diane Ladd.

Driving Miss Daisy won four awards, including Best Picture. Other winners included Glory with three awards, Born on the Fourth of July, The Little Mermaid, and My Left Foot with two, and The Abyss, Balance, Batman, Cinema Paradiso, Common Threads: Stories from the Quilt, Dead Poets Society, Henry V, Indiana Jones and the Last Crusade, The Johnstown Flood, and Work Experience with one. The telecast garnered more than 40 million viewers in the United States.

== Winners and nominees ==
The nominees for the 62nd Academy Awards were announced on February 14, 1990, at the Samuel Goldwyn Theater in Beverly Hills, California, by Karl Malden, president of the academy, and actress Geena Davis. Driving Miss Daisy received the most nominations with nine total; Born on the Fourth of July came in second with eight. Winners were announced during the awards ceremony on March 26, 1990. Driving Miss Daisy became the third film to win Best Picture without a Best Director nomination. At age 80, Jessica Tandy became the oldest Best Actress winner. Kenneth Branagh was the fifth person nominated for Best Lead Actor and Best Director for the same film.

=== Awards ===
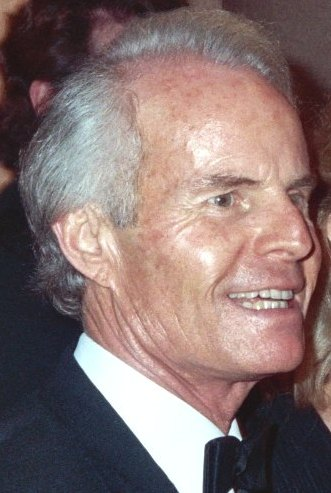
Richard D. Zanuck, Best Picture co-winner

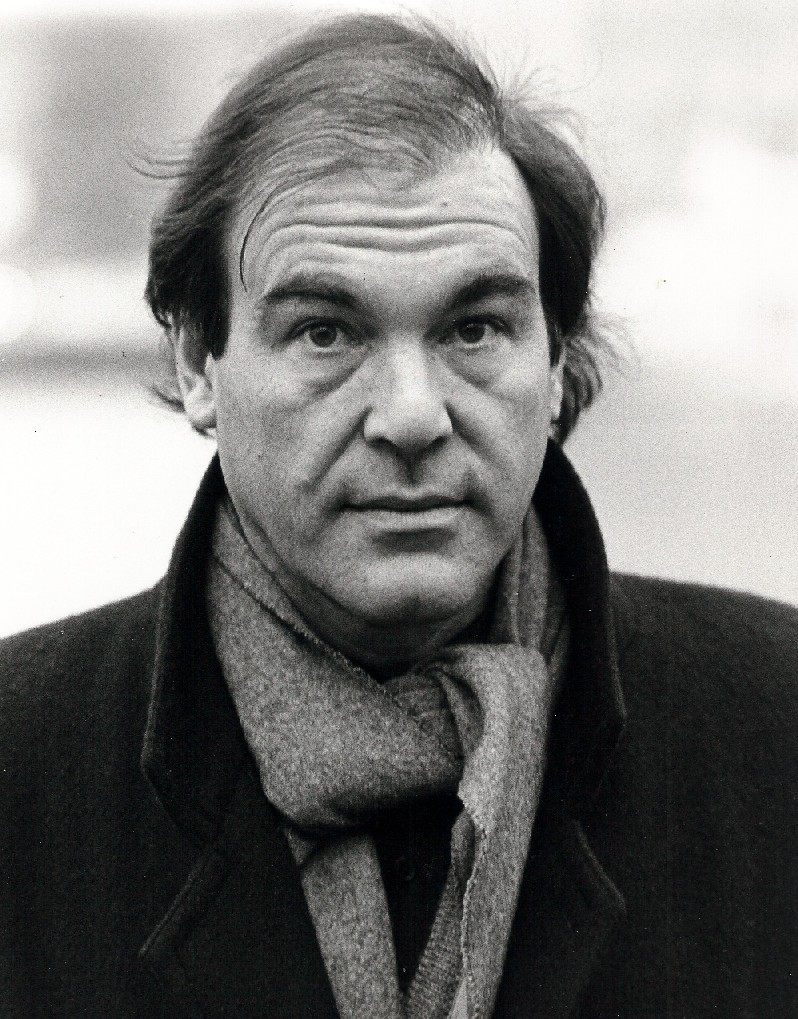
Oliver Stone, Best Director winner

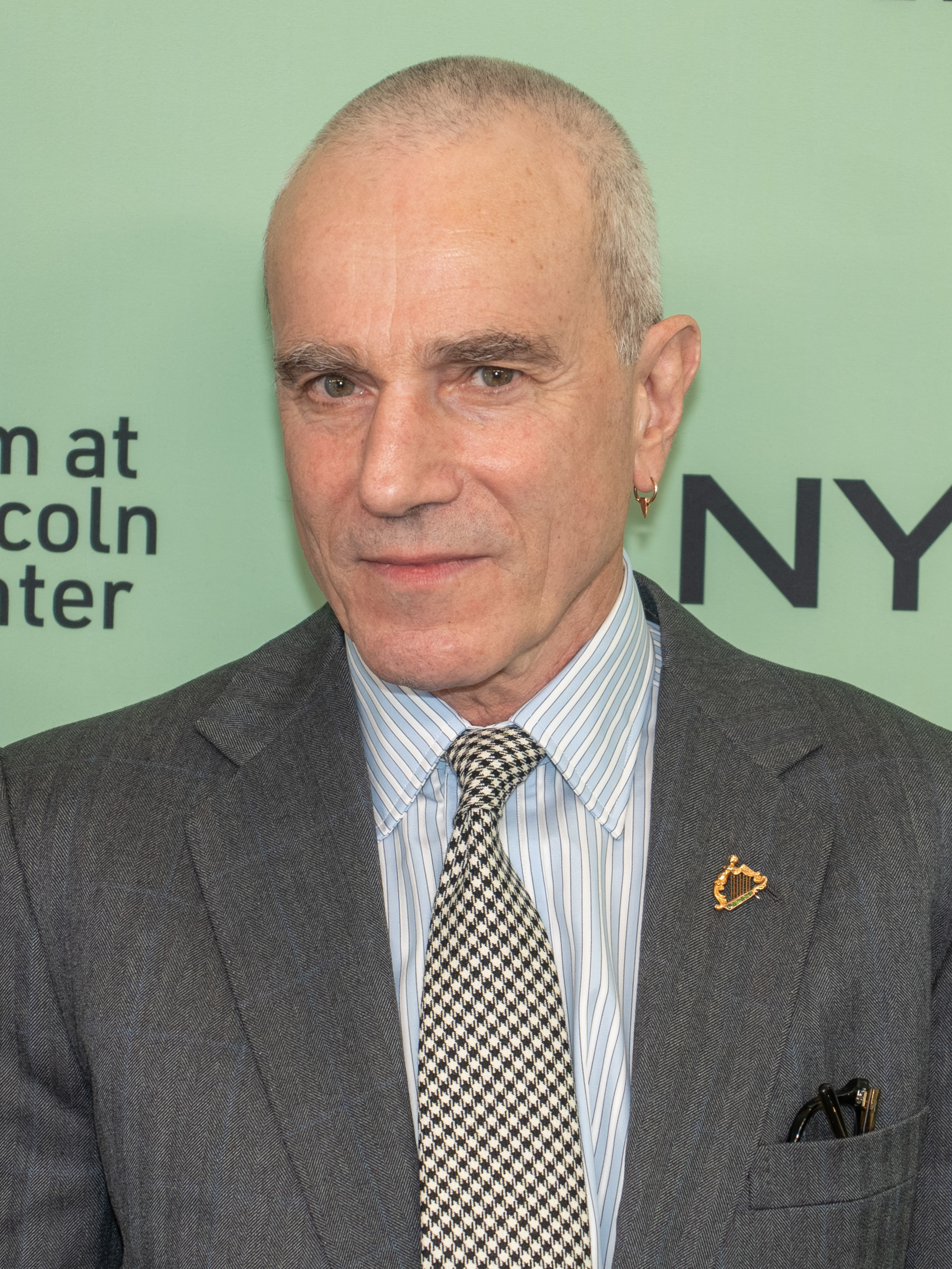
Daniel Day-Lewis, Best Actor winner

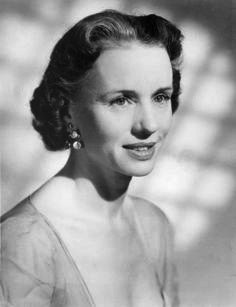
Jessica Tandy, Best Actress winner

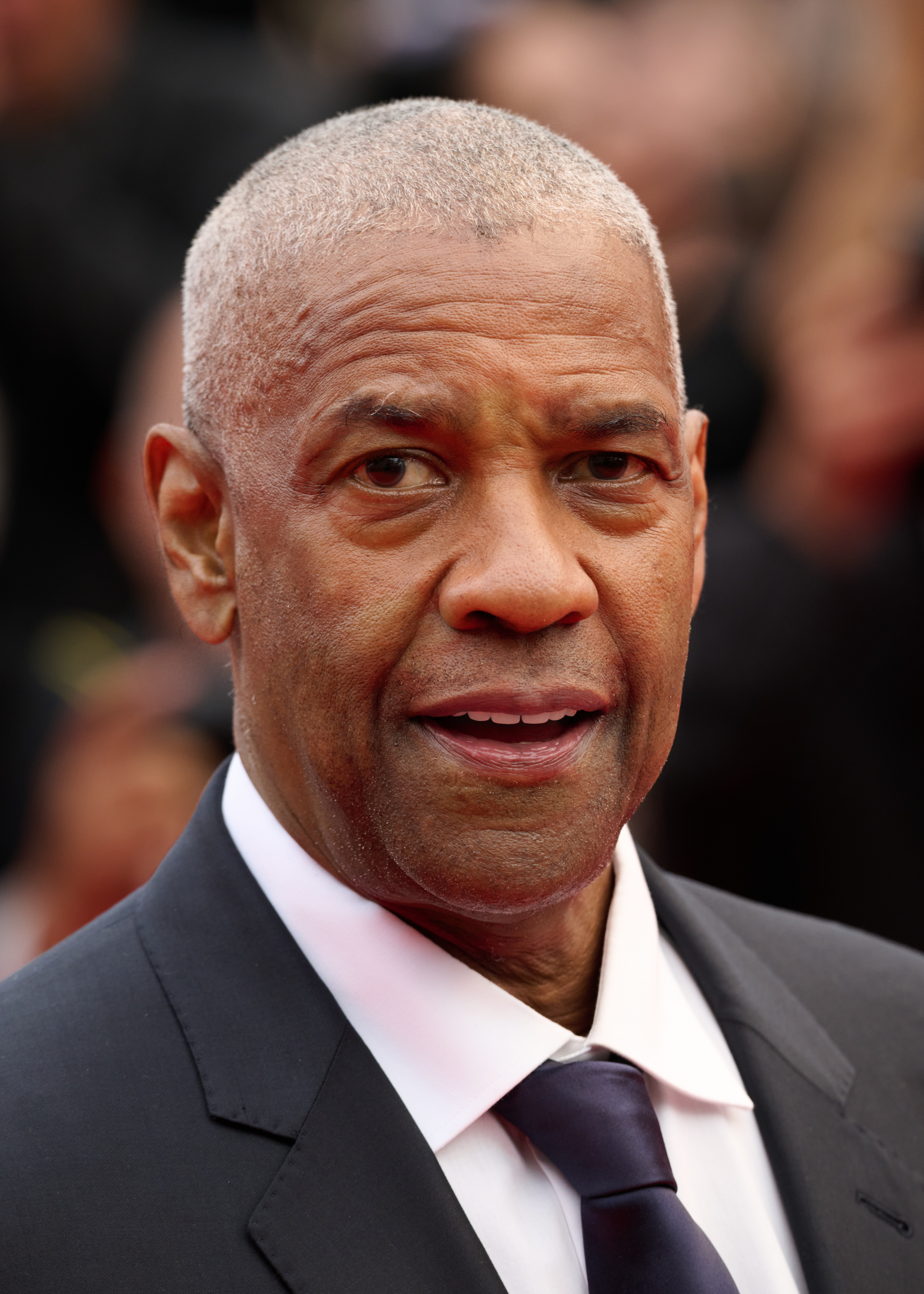
Denzel Washington, Best Supporting Actor winner

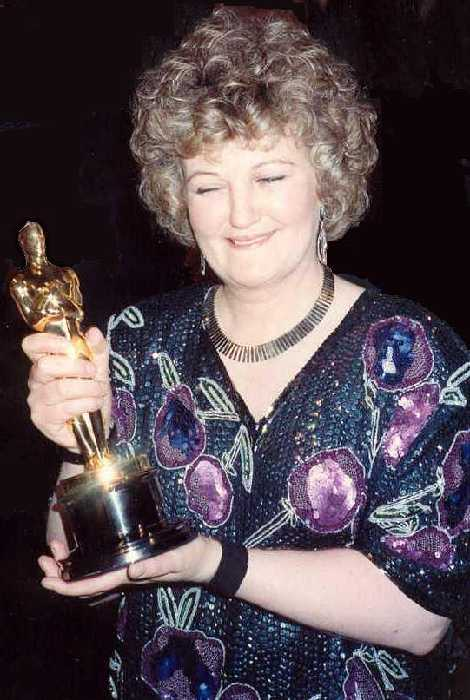
Brenda Fricker, Best Supporting Actress winner

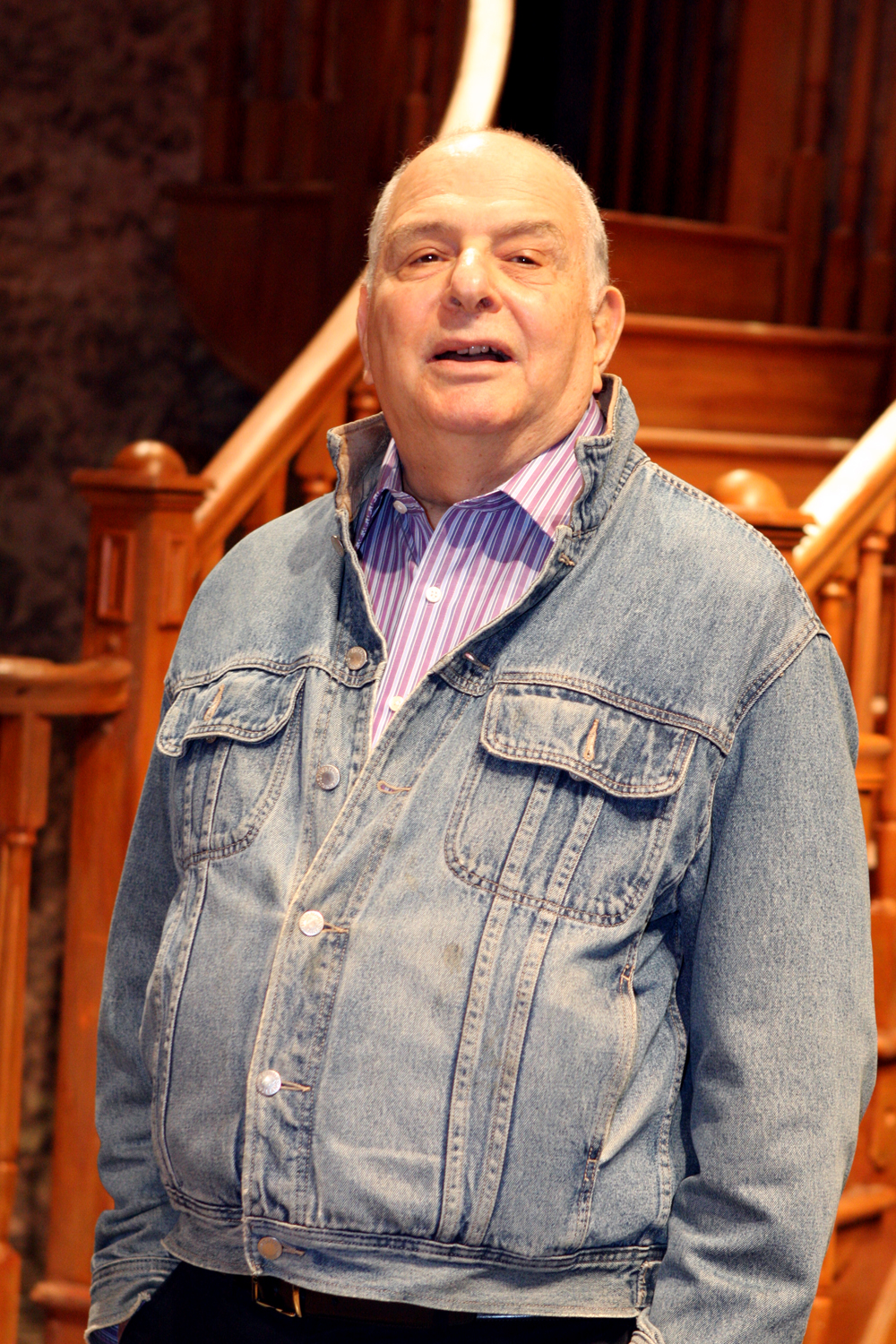
Alfred Uhry, Best Adapted Screenplay winner

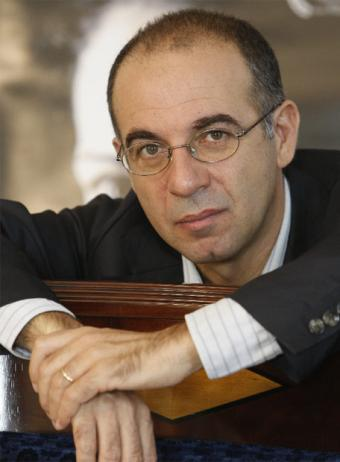
Giuseppe Tornatore, Best Foreign Language film winner

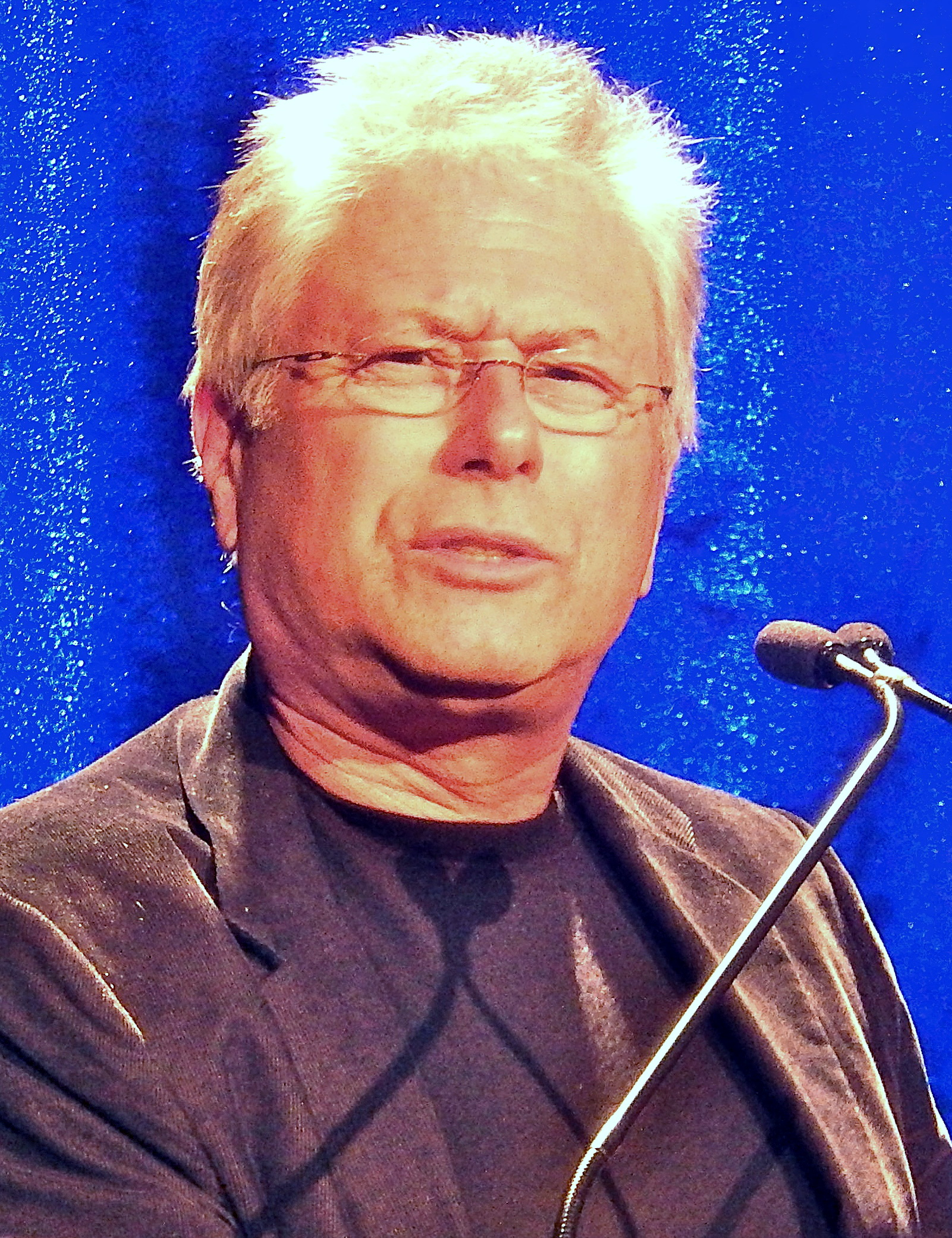
Alan Menken, Best Original Score winner and Best Original Song co-winner

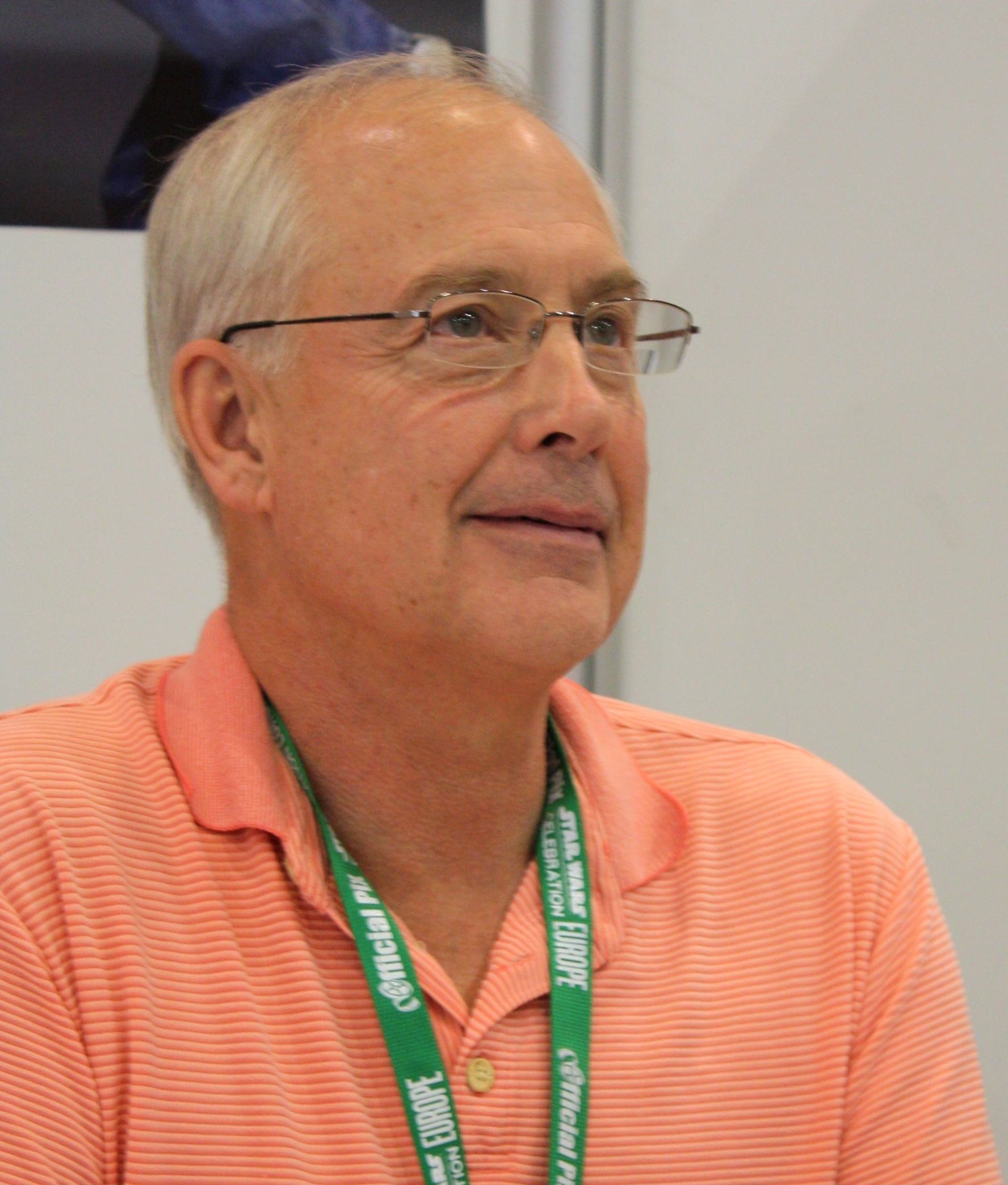
Ben Burtt, Best Sound Effects Editing co-winner

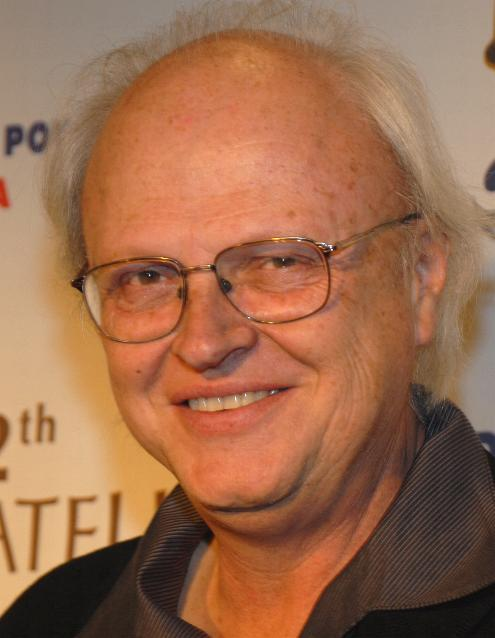
Dennis Muren, Best Visual Effects co-winner

Winners are listed first, highlighted in boldface and indicated with a double-dagger (‡).

**Best Picture**: **Driving Miss Daisy – Richard D. Zanuck and Lili Fini Zanuck, producers**‡; Born on the Fourth of July – A. Kitman Ho and Oliver Stone, producers; Dead Poets Society – Steven Haft, Paul Junger Witt, and Tony Thomas, producers; Field of Dreams – Lawrence Gordon and Charles Gordon, producers; My Left Foot – Noel Pearson, producer	**Best Directing**: **Oliver Stone – Born on the Fourth of July**‡; Woody Allen – Crimes and Misdemeanors; Peter Weir – Dead Poets Society; Kenneth Branagh – Henry V; Jim Sheridan – My Left Foot
**Best Actor in a Leading Role**: **Daniel Day-Lewis – My Left Foot as Christy Brown**‡; Kenneth Branagh – Henry V as King Henry V of England; Tom Cruise – Born on the Fourth of July as Ron Kovic; Morgan Freeman – Driving Miss Daisy as Hoke Colburn; Robin Williams – Dead Poets Society as John Charles Keating	**Best Actress in a Leading Role**: **Jessica Tandy – Driving Miss Daisy as Daisy Werthan**‡; Isabelle Adjani – Camille Claudel as Camille Claudel; Pauline Collins – Shirley Valentine as Shirley Valentine-Bradshaw; Jessica Lange – Music Box as Ann Talbot; Michelle Pfeiffer – The Fabulous Baker Boys as Susie Diamond
**Best Actor in a Supporting Role**: **Denzel Washington – Glory as Pvt. Silas Trip**‡; Danny Aiello – Do the Right Thing as Sal Frangione; Dan Aykroyd – Driving Miss Daisy as Boolie Werthan; Marlon Brando – A Dry White Season as Ian Mackenzie; Martin Landau – Crimes and Misdemeanors as Judah Rosenthal	**Best Actress in a Supporting Role**: **Brenda Fricker – My Left Foot as Bridget Fagan Brown**‡; Anjelica Huston – Enemies, A Love Story as Tamara Broder; Lena Olin – Enemies, A Love Story as Masha; Julia Roberts – Steel Magnolias as Shelby Eatenton Latcherie; Dianne Wiest – Parenthood as Helen Buckman
**Best Writing (Screenplay Written Directly for the Screen)**: **Dead Poets Society – Tom Schulman**‡; Crimes and Misdemeanors – Woody Allen; Do the Right Thing – Spike Lee; Sex, Lies, and Videotape – Steven Soderbergh; When Harry Met Sally... – Nora Ephron	**Best Writing (Screenplay Based on Material from Another Medium)**: **Driving Miss Daisy – Alfred Uhry based on his play**‡; Born on the Fourth of July – Oliver Stone and Ron Kovic based on the autobiography by Ron Kovic; Enemies, A Love Story – Roger L. Simon and Paul Mazursky based on the novel by Isaac Bashevis Singer; Field of Dreams – Phil Alden Robinson based on Shoeless Joe by W. P. Kinsella; My Left Foot – Jim Sheridan and Shane Connaughton based on the autobiography by Christy Brown
**Best Foreign Language Film**: **Cinema Paradiso (Italy) – Giuseppe Tornatore**‡; Camille Claudel (France) – Bruno Nuytten; Jesus of Montreal (Canada) – Denys Arcand; Waltzing Regitze (Denmark) – Kaspar Rostrup; What Happened to Santiago (Puerto Rico) – Jacobo Morales	**Best Documentary (Feature)**: **Common Threads: Stories from the Quilt – Rob Epstein and Bill Couturié**‡; Adam Clayton Powell – Richard Kilberg and Yvonne Smith; Crack USA: County Under Siege – Vince DiPersio and Bill Guttentag; For All Mankind – Al Reinert and Betsy Broyles Breier; Super Chief: The Life and Legacy of Earl Warren – Judith Leonard and Bill Jersey
**Best Documentary (Short Subject)**: **The Johnstown Flood – Charles Guggenheim**‡; Fine Food, Fine Pastries, Open 6 to 9 – David Petersen; Yad Vashem: Preserving the Past to Ensure the Future – Ray Errol Fox	**Best Short Film (Live Action)**: **Work Experience – James Hendrie**‡; Amazon Diary – Robert Nixon; The Childeater – Jonathan Tammuz
**Best Short Film (Animated)**: **Balance – Christoph Lauenstein and Wolfgang Lauenstein**‡; The Cow – Aleksandr Petrov; The Hill Farm – Mark Baker	**Best Music (Original Score)**: **The Little Mermaid – Alan Menken**‡; Born on the Fourth of July – John Williams; The Fabulous Baker Boys – Dave Grusin; Field of Dreams – James Horner; Indiana Jones and the Last Crusade – John Williams
**Best Music (Original Song)**: **"Under the Sea" from The Little Mermaid – Music by Alan Menken; Lyrics by Howard Ashman**‡; "After All" from Chances Are – Music by Tom Snow; Lyrics by Dean Pitchford; "The Girl Who Used to Be Me" from Shirley Valentine – Music by Marvin Hamlisch; Lyrics by Alan and Marilyn Bergman; "I Love To See You Smile" from Parenthood – Music and Lyrics by Randy Newman; "Kiss the Girl" from The Little Mermaid – Music by Alan Menken; Lyrics by Howard Ashman	**Best Sound**: **Glory – Donald O. Mitchell, Gregg Rudloff, Elliot Tyson and Russell Williams II**‡; The Abyss – Don Bassman, Kevin F. Cleary, Richard Overton and Lee Orloff; Black Rain – Donald O. Mitchell, Kevin O'Connell, Greg P. Russell and Keith A. Wester; Born on the Fourth of July – Michael Minkler, Gregory H. Watkins, Wylie Stateman and Tod A. Maitland; Indiana Jones and the Last Crusade – Ben Burtt, Gary Summers, Shawn Murphy and Tony Dawe
**Best Sound Effects Editing**: **Indiana Jones and the Last Crusade – Richard Hymns and Ben Burtt**‡; Black Rain – Milton Burrow and William Manger; Lethal Weapon 2 – Robert G. Henderson and Alan Robert Murray	**Best Art Direction**: **Batman – Art Direction: Anton Furst; Set Decoration: Peter Young**‡; The Abyss – Art Direction: Leslie Dilley; Set Decoration: Anne Kuljian; The Adventures of Baron Munchausen – Art Direction: Dante Ferretti; Set Decoration: Francesca Lo Schiavo; Driving Miss Daisy – Art Direction: Bruno Rubeo; Set Decoration: Crispian Sallis; Glory – Art Direction: Norman Garwood; Set Decoration: Garrett Lewis
**Best Cinematography**: **Glory – Freddie Francis**‡; The Abyss – Mikael Salomon; Blaze – Haskell Wexler; Born on the Fourth of July – Robert Richardson; The Fabulous Baker Boys – Michael Ballhaus	**Best Makeup**: **Driving Miss Daisy – Manlio Rocchetti, Lynn Barber and Kevin Haney**‡; The Adventures of Baron Munchausen – Maggie Weston and Fabrizio Sforza; Dad – Dick Smith, Ken Diaz and Greg Nelson
**Best Costume Design**: **Henry V – Phyllis Dalton**‡; The Adventures of Baron Munchausen – Gabriella Pescucci; Driving Miss Daisy – Elizabeth McBride; Harlem Nights – Joe I. Tompkins; Valmont – Theodor Pištěk	**Best Film Editing**: **Born on the Fourth of July – David Brenner and Joe Hutshing**‡; The Bear – Noëlle Boisson; Driving Miss Daisy – Mark Warner; The Fabulous Baker Boys – William Steinkamp; Glory – Steven Rosenblum
**Best Visual Effects**: **The Abyss – Dennis Muren, Hoyt Yeatman, John Bruno and Dennis Skotak**‡; The Adventures of Baron Munchausen – Richard Conway and Kent Houston; Back to the Future Part II – Ken Ralston, Michael Lantieri, John Bell and Steve Gawley

=== Honorary Award ===
- To Akira Kurosawa for accomplishments that have inspired, delighted, enriched and entertained audiences and influenced filmmakers throughout the world.

=== Jean Hersholt Humanitarian Award ===
- Howard W. Koch

=== Films with multiple nominations and multiple awards ===
The following 19 films received multiple nominations:

Nominations	Film
9	Driving Miss Daisy
8	Born on the Fourth of July
5	Glory
5	My Left Foot
4	The Abyss
4	The Adventures of Baron Munchausen
4	Dead Poets Society
4	The Fabulous Baker Boys
3	Crimes and Misdemeanors
3	Enemies, A Love Story
3	Field of Dreams
3	Henry V
3	Indiana Jones and the Last Crusade
3	The Little Mermaid
2	Black Rain
2	Camille Claudel
2	Do the Right Thing
2	Parenthood
2	Shirley Valentine

The following five films received multiple awards:

Awards	Film
4	Driving Miss Daisy
3	Glory
2	Born on the Fourth of July
2	The Little Mermaid
2	My Left Foot

== Presenters and performers ==
The following individuals presented awards or performed musical numbers.

=== Presenters (in order of appearance) ===
Name(s)	Role
Charlie O'Donnell	Announcer for the 62nd annual Academy Awards
Karl Malden (AMPAS President)	Gave opening remarks welcoming guests to the awards ceremony
Geena Davis	Presenter of the award for Best Supporting Actor
Glenn Close; Mel Gibson	Presenters of the award for Best Art Direction
Arnold Schwarzenegger	Introducer of presenter Kim Basinger
Kim Basinger	Presenter of the film Dead Poets Society on the Best Picture segment
Julia Roberts	Introducer of the performance of Best Original Song nominee "I Love to See You Smile"
Steve Martin	Presenter of the award for Best Original Score
Kenneth Branagh; Elizabeth McGovern	Presenters of award for Best Makeup
Jack Lemmon; Natalya Negoda	Presenters of the award for Best Foreign Language Film
Kevin Kline	Presenter of the award for Best Supporting Actress
Beau Bridges; Jeff Bridges	Presenters of the film Field of Dreams on the Best Picture segment
John Candy; Rick Moranis	Presenters of the award for Best Live Action Short Film
Daryl Hannah	Introducer of the performances of Best Original Song nominees "Kiss the Girl" and "Under the Sea"
Bugs Bunny	Presenter of the award for Best Animated Short Film
Walter Matthau	Presenter of the Jean Hersholt Humanitarian Award to Howard W. Koch
Jessica Lange	Presenter of the film Driving Miss Daisy on the Best Picture segment
Morgan Freeman; Jessica Tandy	Presenter of the award for Best Film Editing
John Goodman	Introducer of the performance of Best Original Song nominee "The Girl Who Used to Be Me"
Tom Selleck	Introducer of Isabelle Huppert
Isabelle Huppert	Presenter of the segment of the Academy Awards for Technical Achievement and the Gordon E. Sawyer Award
Bryan Brown; Rachel Ward	Presenters of the awards for Best Sound and Best Sound Effects Editing
Melanie Griffith; Tom Hanks	Presenters of the award for Best Cinematography
Gregory Peck	Presenter of the award for Best Actress
Candice Bergen	Presenter of the award for Best Costume Design
Dan Aykroyd; Chevy Chase	Presenters of the award for Best Visual Effects
Jack Valenti	Introducer of presenters George Lucas and Steven Spielberg
George Lucas; Steven Spielberg	Presenters of the Honorary Academy Award to Akira Kurosawa
Denzel Washington	Introducer of the performance of Best Original Song nominee "After All"
Paula Abdul; Dudley Moore	Presenters of the award for Best Original Song
Danny Glover	Presenter of the film Born on the Fourth of July Best Picture segment
Norma Aleandro; Charlton Heston	Presenters of the awards for Best Documentary Short Subject and Best Documentary Feature
Jane Fonda	Presenter of the awards for Best Screenplay Written Directly for the Screen and Best Screenplay Based on Material from Another Medium
Anjelica Huston	Presenter of the film My Left Foot on the Best Picture segment
Robert De Niro; Martin Scorsese	Presenters of the award for Best Director
Jodie Foster	Presenter of the award for Best Actor
Michelle Pfeiffer	Introducer of the performance of "Over the Rainbow"
Warren Beatty; Jack Nicholson	Presenters of the award for Best Picture

=== Performers (in order of appearance) ===
Name(s)	Role	Performed
Bill Conti	Musical Arranger	Orchestral
Billy Crystal	Performer	Opening number: My Left Foot (to the tune of "Me and My Shadow"); Field of Dreams (to the tune of "Tangerine" from The Fleet's In); Dead Poets Society (to the tune of "Mutual Admiration Society" from Happy Hunting); Driving Miss Daisy (to the tune of "Walkin' My Baby Back Home"); Born on the Fourth of July (to the tune of "Born in the U.S.A." by Bruce Springsteen)
Randy Newman	Performer	"I Love to See You Smile" from Parenthood
Geoffrey Holder	Performer	"Kiss the Girl" and "Under the Sea" from The Little Mermaid
Patti Austin	Performer	"The Girl Who Used to Be Me" from Shirley Valentine
James Ingram; Melissa Manchester	Performers	"After All" from Chances Are
Diana Ross	Performer	"Over the Rainbow" from The Wizard of Oz

== Ceremony information ==
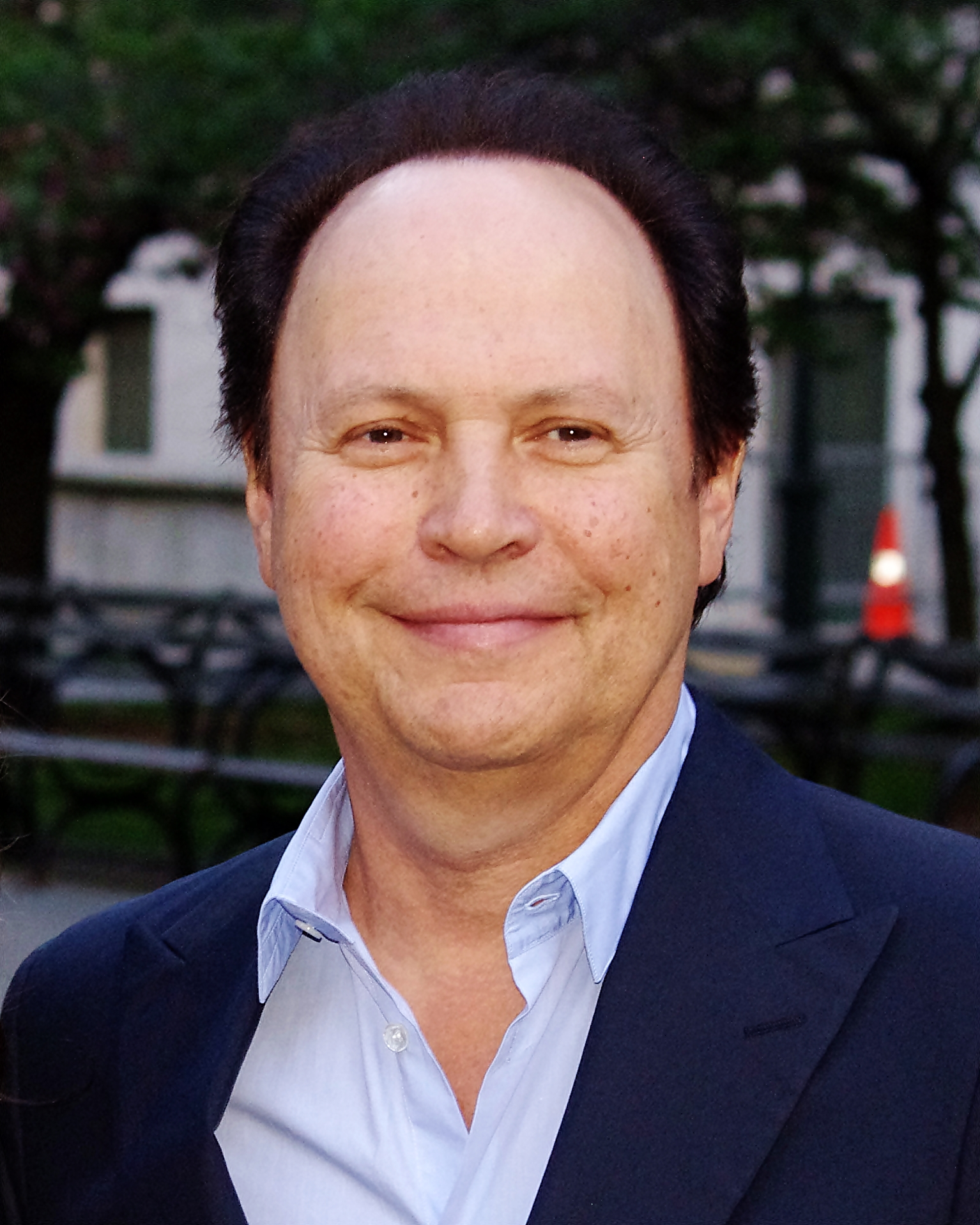
Billy Crystal hosted the 62nd Academy Awards.

After the negative reception received from the preceding year's ceremony, AMPAS created an Awards Presentation Review Committee to evaluate and determine why the telecast earned such a negative reaction from the media and the entertainment industry. The committee later determined that Carr's biggest mistake was allowing the questionable opening number to run for 12 minutes. Producer and former Directors Guild of America president Gilbert Cates, who headed the committee, said that Carr would not have received such harsh criticism if the number had been much shorter. Newly elected AMPAS president Karl Malden also commented on last year's telecast, "Some of the people in the Academy felt the show got a little out of control."

In September 1989, Cates was chosen as producer of the 1990 telecast. Malden explained the decision to hire him, saying, "Cates, a veteran film and TV director known for his tasteful work in both media, will attempt to rectify the damage the last Oscar show did to the Academy's reputation." The following January, actor and comedian Billy Crystal was chosen as host of the ceremony. "We are extremely pleased to have Billy host the show," Cates said in a press release justifying his choice. "His unique talents and his ability to handle the unexpected will be important assets this year."

Cates christened the show with the theme "Around the World in 3 1/2 Hours," commenting that it would be "a party thrown around the world". He also explained, "The world is changing, and hopefully the awards show is changing, matching the changes in the world." In tandem with the program's theme, several presenters announced the winners from various international locales such as Buenos Aires, London, Moscow, and Sydney, Australia.

Several other people participated in the production of the ceremony. Documentary filmmaker Chuck Workman assembled a montage saluting "100 Years at the Movies" that was shown at the beginning of the telecast. Film composer and musician Bill Conti served as musical director for the ceremony. Dancer and singer Paula Abdul supervised the Best Song nominee performances and a dance number featuring the Best Costume Design nominees. Singer Diana Ross performed the Oscar-winning song "Over the Rainbow" in a tribute to the 50th anniversary of The Wizard of Oz.

=== Box office performance of nominees ===
At the time of the nominations announcement on February 14, the combined gross of the five Best Picture nominees at the US box office was $244 million with an average of $48.9 million. Dead Poets Society was the highest earner among the Best Picture nominees with $95.8 million in domestic box office receipts. The film was followed by Field of Dreams ($64.4 million), Born on the Fourth of July ($48.6 million), Driving Miss Daisy ($35.6 million) and My Left Foot ($2.1 million).

Of the 50 grossing movies of the year, 43 nominations went to 14 films on the list. Only Parenthood (8th), Dead Poets Society (9th), When Harry Met Sally... (10th), Field of Dreams (17th), Born on the Fourth of July (25th), Driving Miss Daisy (36th), and Sex, Lies, and Videotape (45th) were nominated for Best Picture, acting, directing, or screenwriting. The other top 50 box office hits that earned nominations were Batman (1st), Indiana Jones and the Last Crusade (2nd), Lethal Weapon 2 (3rd), Back to the Future II (6th), The Little Mermaid (12th), The Abyss (22nd), and Black Rain (27th).

=== Critical reviews ===
The show received a mixed reception from media publications. Some media outlets were more critical of the show. Film critic Janet Maslin of The New York Times gave an average review of Crystal but lamented, "The effort to make this year's Academy Awards show an international media miracle led to nothing but headaches." The Washington Post television critic Tom Shales bemoaned, "while Crystal's opening monologue seemed to hit the right notes, he hit fewer and fewer as the evening wore on; his interjected quips between awards were mostly uninspired." He also criticized the dance numbers and numerous "Around the World" cutaways, calling it pointless. Howard Rosenberg of the Los Angeles Times quipped that the broadcast was "a conventional telecast that was arguably an extension of an industry calcified by convention". He gave positive remarks toward Crystal but felt that "The Oscarcast was an old kid on the block."

Other media outlets received the broadcast more positively. USA Today television critic Matt Roush lauded "...the glib and savvy Billy Crystal, who kept things as lively and funny as he could all night long. What a chore, too." He concluded that, "Hollywood no doubt went to bed happy (maybe early), because for a change, Oscar didn't embarrass himself." Mike Drew of the Milwaukee Journal Sentinel remarked, "While too "inside" and not as funny as Hollywood thinks he is, Crystal was an efficient host." Film critic Carrie Rickey of The Philadelphia Inquirer wrote, "It was encouraging that director Gilbert Cates took the opportunity to emphasize films instead of chorus girls." She also extolled Crystal's performance, acknowledging that his "nimble opening number set a Johnny Carson comic tone."

=== Ratings and reception ===
The American telecast on ABC drew in an average of 40.24 million people over its length, which was a 5% decrease from the previous year's ceremony. An estimated 70 million total viewers watched all or part of the awards. The show also drew lower Nielsen ratings compared to the previous ceremony, with 27.82% of households watching over a 49.42 share.

In July 1990, the ceremony presentation received five nominations at the 42nd Primetime Emmys. Two months later, the ceremony won one of those nominations for Outstanding Art Direction for a Variety or Music Program (Roy Christopher and Greg Richman).

== See also ==
- 10th Golden Raspberry Awards
- 32nd Grammy Awards
- 42nd Primetime Emmy Awards
- 47th Golden Globe Awards
- 43rd British Academy Film Awards
- 44th Tony Awards
- List of submissions to the 62nd Academy Awards for Best Foreign Language Film

== Bibliography ==
- Osborne, Robert (2013). 85 Years of the Oscar: The Complete History of the Academy Awards. New York, New York, United States: Abbeville Publishing Group. ISBN 978-0-7892-1142-2.
- Wiley, Mason; Bona, Damien (1996), Inside Oscar: The Unofficial History of the Academy Awards (5 ed.), New York, United States: Ballantine Books, ISBN 0-345-40053-4, OCLC 779680732
