= Connie Panzarino =

American disability rights activist

- Connie Panzarino, from the 1965 yearbook of Massapequa High School
- Born: Concetta Jean Panzarino; November 26, 1947; New York City, United States
- Died: July 4, 2001 (aged 53); Boston, Massachusetts, United States
- Occupations: Disability rights activist, writer, art therapist

Concetta Jean "Connie" Panzarino (November 26, 1947 – July 4, 2001) was an American writer and activist for disability rights and LGBTQ rights.

== Early life and education ==
Panzarino was born in New York City, and raised on Long Island, the daughter of Frank V. Panzarino and Antoinette (Anne) Panzarino. She was born with spinal muscular atrophy type III, a progressive neuromuscular disease also known as Werdnig-Hoffmann disease. In 1960 she appeared on posters for a fundraising appeal for the Muscular Dystrophy Association. She graduated from Massapequa High School in 1965. She completed a bachelor's degree from Hofstra University in 1969, and a master's degree in art therapy from New York University.

== Career ==
Panzarino worked in social services in Nassau County as a young woman, but had to quit when her income left her ineligible for the in-home supports she required. She was a registered art therapist and director of the Boston Self Help Center from 1986 to 1989. She worked with survivors of abuse and lectured on sexism, homophobia, and ableism. She also served on the boards of several organizations supporting disabled people, including the Disability Law Center and the Boston Center for Independent Living. She lobbied and marched in Washington, D.C. in the 1970s, for Section 504 and for work opportunities for disabled people. "I really don't lead a calm life," she told a New York Times reporter in 1977. She created Beechwood (Beechtree), a cooperative living community for disabled women. She wrote a memoir, The Me in the Mirror (1994). Her memoir was adapted for the stage and performed at the Women on Top Theatre Festival in Boston in 2000.

== Disabled Lesbian Alliance ==
The Disabled Lesbian Alliance (DLA) was an organization founded by Panzarino in New York City in 1978. The first meeting was held on July 15, 1978, in Panzarino's New York University student housing apartment. It was attended by six women, including Panzarino's aide, Nancy Robinson, and Rosalyn Richter. Other early members included Lyda Schoenfield and Gwen Elliot, who went on to participate in the later Lesbian Illness Support Group.

The organization's early efforts focused on increasing accessibility in lesbian spaces through ASL interpreters, the inclusion of Braille on printed materials, and physical spaces without stairs. They were successful in spurring the Women's Liberation Center to move a slideshow screening by Tee Corinne from the third to the first floor. In the early 1980s, the DLA began expanding their reach to a national level, publishing an open statement about the necessity of accessibility in lesbian spaces. The statement was circulated in various feminist newspapers, including Sojourner, New Women's Times, off our backs, and Big Mama's Rag, and encouraged able-bodied lesbians to form consciousness-raising groups and prioritize the inclusion of disabled lesbians in community spaces.

The organization was largely inactive by 1989. The records of the Disabled Lesbian Alliance, along with correspondence between Panzarino and other lesbian disability advocates, are housed at the Lesbian Herstory Archives.

== Publications ==
- "whose festival?" (1982)
- "Female Homosexuality" (1991)
- The Me in the Mirror (1994)
- Rebecca Finds a New Way: How Kids Learn, Play, and Live with Spinal Cord Injuries and Illnesses (1994)
- "To My Other Bodies" (1996)
- "No Decision Here" (1999)
- "Camping with a Ventilator" (2001)

== Personal life and legacy ==
Panzarino had a close relationship with disabled Vietnam War veteran and activist Ron Kovic. They went to high school together, and he thanked her in his memoir Born on the Fourth of July, saying "She stood by me like no one else, listened through nights and days, caring and loving, understanding and encouraging, wiping the tears from my eyes."

She identified as a lesbian, and a photograph of Panzarino by Joan E. Biren appeared in Eye to Eye: Portraits of Lesbians (1979), where she said that "there is a disabled closet as well as a Lesbian closet", and that "it was easy for [her] to come out as a Lesbian because [she] always had to be a strong woman.”

She died in 2001, at the age of 53, in Boston. Her work is frequently the subject of scholarship on intersectional queer/disabled identities.
