= Francesca Lo Schiavo =

Italian set decorator

- Born: Rome, Italy
- Occupation: Set decorator
- Years active: 1989 – present
- Spouse: Dante Ferretti

Francesca Lo Schiavo (Italian pronunciation: [franˈtʃeska lo ˈskjaːvo]) is an Italian set decorator.

As of 2023, she is a vice-president on the board of the Ischia Global Film & Music Festival, an international film festival held on the Italian island of Ischia.

She is married to fellow art director and co-collaborator Dante Ferretti.

== Awards ==
Lo Schiavo has been nominated for the Academy Award for Best Art Direction eight times, winning three of them. The movies which she has been nominated for are:

- The Adventures of Baron Munchausen (1989), Nominated.
- Hamlet (1990), Nominated.
- Interview with the Vampire (1994), Nominated.
- Kundun (1997), Nominated.
- Gangs of New York (2002), Nominated.
- The Aviator (2004), Won.
- Sweeney Todd: The Demon Barber of Fleet Street (2007), Won.
- Hugo (2011), Won.
