= The Adventures of Baron Munchausen =

1988 film by Terry Gilliam

- Theatrical release poster by Lucinda Cowell
- Directed by: Terry Gilliam
- Written by: Charles McKeown; Terry Gilliam
- Produced by: Thomas Schühly
- Starring: John Neville; Eric Idle; Sarah Polley; Oliver Reed; Uma Thurman; Jonathan Pryce; Valentina Cortese
- Cinematography: Giuseppe Rotunno
- Edited by: Peter Hollywood
- Music by: Michael Kamen
- Production companies: Allied Filmmakers; Laura Film; Prominent Features
- Distributed by: Columbia Pictures (worldwide); Neue Constantin Film (West Germany)
- Release dates: 8 December 1988 (West Germany); 10 March 1989 (United States); 17 March 1989 (United Kingdom)
- Running time: 126 minutes
- Countries: United Kingdom; United States; West Germany
- Language: English
- Budget: $46.6 million
- Box office: $8.1 million

The Adventures of Baron Munchausen is a 1988 fantasy adventure film co-written and directed by Terry Gilliam, starring John Neville, Eric Idle, Sarah Polley, Oliver Reed, Uma Thurman, Jonathan Pryce and Valentina Cortese. An international co-production of the United Kingdom, the United States and Germany, the film is based on the tall tales of the 18th-century German nobleman Baron Munchausen and his wartime exploits against the Ottoman Empire.

The film grossed only $8 million domestically, losing millions for Columbia Pictures. It received positive reviews from critics, and was nominated for four Academy Awards: Best Art Direction, Best Costume Design, Best Makeup and Best Visual Effects.

== Plot ==
In an unnamed war-torn European city in the "Age of Reason", a large Ottoman army prepares an invasion outside the city gates. A touring stage production of Baron Munchausen's life and adventures is taking place. In a theatre box, the mayor, "The Right Ordinary" Horatio Jackson, reinforces the city's commitment to reason by ordering the execution of a soldier who had just accomplished a near-superhuman feat of bravery, claiming that his bravery is demoralizing to other soldiers and citizens.

The play is interrupted by an elderly man claiming to be the real Baron, protesting its many inaccuracies. Over the complaints of the audience, the theatre company and Jackson, the "real" Baron gains the house's attention and narrates through flashback an account of one of his adventures, of a life-or-death wager with the Grand Turk, in which the younger Baron's life is saved only by his amazing luck, plus the assistance of his remarkable associates: Berthold, the world's fastest runner; Adolphus, a rifleman with superhuman eyesight; Gustavus, who possesses extraordinary hearing and powerful lungs; and the fantastically strong Albrecht.

When gunfire disrupts the elderly Baron's story, Jackson cancels the acting troupe's contract because of the Baron. The Baron wanders backstage, where the Angel of Death tries to take his life, but Sally Salt, the young daughter of the theatre company's leader, saves him and persuades him to remain living. Sally races to the wall, yelling for the Turkish army to leave. The Baron accidentally fires himself through the sky using a mortar, and returns riding a cannonball, narrowly escaping the Angel of Death again. Insisting that he alone can save the city, the Baron escapes over the city's walls in a hot air balloon constructed of women's underwear, accompanied by Sally as a stowaway.

The balloon expedition proceeds to the Moon, where the Baron, who has grown younger, finds Berthold, but angers the King of the Moon, a giant with separate minds in his head and body, and who resents the Baron for his romantic past with the Queen of the Moon. The death of the King's body and a bungled escape from the Moon bring the trio back to the Earth and into the volcano of the Roman god, Vulcan. He hosts the group as his guests, and reveals that Albrecht is working as his servant. The Baron and Vulcan's wife, Venus, attempt a romantic interlude by waltzing in the air, prompting an irate Vulcan to expel the foursome from his kingdom into the South Seas.

Swallowed by an enormous sea creature, the travellers locate Gustavus, Adolphus and the Baron's trusty horse, Bucephalus. The Baron (who appears elderly again after being "expelled from a state of bliss") encounters the Angel of Death for the fourth time. They escape by blowing "a modicum of snuff" into the sea creature's cavernous interior, causing it to sneeze the heroes out through its whale-like blowhole. The Baron, young again, sails to where the Turkish army is located, but his associates are too elderly and tired to fight.

The Baron firmly lectures them, but to no avail, so he storms off, intending to surrender to the Grand Turk. His companions rally to save the Baron, and, through a series of fantastic acts, they rout the Turkish army and liberate the city. During the city's celebratory parade, the Baron is shot dead by Jackson, and the Angel of Death appears for a final time to take the Baron's life. An emotional public funeral takes place, but the denouement reveals that this is merely the final scene of yet another story that the Baron is telling to the same theatregoers in the city. The Baron calls the foregoing "only one of the many occasions on which I met my death", and closes his tale by saying that "everyone who had a talent for it lived happily ever after".

The Baron leads the citizens to the city gates to reveal that the city has indeed been saved, although it is unclear if the events of the battle occurred in a tall tale or in reality. Sally asks, "It wasn't just a story, was it?" The Baron grins, rides away on Bucephalus, and disappears.

== Cast ==
- John Neville as Baron Munchausen
- Eric Idle as Berthold/Desmond
- Sarah Polley as Sally Salt
- Oliver Reed as Vulcan
- Charles McKeown as Adolphus/Rupert
- Winston Dennis as Albrecht/Bill
- Jack Purvis as Gustavus/Jeremy
- Valentina Cortese as Queen Ariadne/Violet
- Jonathan Pryce as The Right Ordinary Horatio Jackson
- Bill Paterson as Henry Salt
- Peter Jeffrey as Sultan Mahmud I
- Uma Thurman as Venus/Rose
- Alison Steadman as Daisy
- Ray Cooper as Functionary

In addition, Robin Williams—credited as "Ray D. Tutto" (a play on "king of everything" in Italian)—portrays the King of the Moon. Director Terry Gilliam explained, "The deal was that we couldn't use his [Williams] name because his agents said, 'We don't want you pimping his ass for your film.' [...] so that's why Robin is not credited." Sting has a credited cameo and Gilliam has an uncredited cameo as an irritating singer.

== Production ==
=== Background ===
Tall tales, loosely based on the German adventurer Hieronymus Karl Friedrich Freiherr von Münchhausen, or Baron Munchausen, were compiled by Rudolf Erich Raspe and published for English readers in 1785 as The Surprising Adventures of Baron Munchausen (or Baron Munchausen's Narrative of His Marvellous Travels and Campaigns in Russia). The tales were further embellished and translated back to German by Gottfried August Bürger in 1786. These tales were frequently extended and translated throughout the 19th century, further fictionalized in the 1901 American novel, Mr. Munchausen.

The stories were adapted into various films, including Baron Munchausen's Dream (1911, by Georges Méliès), Münchhausen (1943, by Josef von Báky, with a script by Erich Kästner), The Fabulous Baron Munchausen (1961, by Karel Zeman) and The Very Same Munchhausen (1979), directed by Mark Zakharov, who depicted Munchausen as a tragic character, struggling against the conformity and hypocrisy of the world around him.

20th Century Fox and Arnon Milchan announced the making of two films, The Improbable Adventures of Baron Munchausen I and II, with Terry Gilliam in February 1984.

=== Budget ===
The film went over budget; what was originally $23.5 million grew to a reported $46.63 million. Gilliam, acknowledging that he had gone over budget, said that its final costs had been nowhere near $40 million.

In The Madness and Misadventures of Munchausen (included on the bonus DVD of the 20th Anniversary Edition of Munchausen), producer Thomas Schühly said that, as part of a deal with 20th Century Fox before it went to Columbia, a budget plan had been set up for $35 million, "and it's strange, the [film's] final cost was 35 [million].... We always had a budget of 34 or 35 million, the problem was when I started to discuss it with Columbia, Columbia would not go beyond 25.... Everybody knew from the very beginning that this cutting out was just a fake.... The problem was that David Puttnam got fired, and all these deals were oral deals.... Columbia's new CEO, Dawn Steel, said, 'Whatever David Puttnam [has] said before doesn't interest me'."

Regarding the new regime's apparent animosity towards all of Puttnam's projects and Munchausen, Gilliam added in the same documentary, "I was trying very hard to convince Dawn Steel that this was not a David Puttnam movie, it was a Terry Gilliam movie." Similarly, Kent Houston, head of Peerless Camera, which was doing the film's special effects, said in Madness and Misadventures that they were promised a bonus if they would finish the effects in time, but when they approached the person again when they were done, he was met with the reply, "I'm not gonna pay you, because I don't want to seem to be doing anything that could benefit Terry Gilliam."

=== Experience ===
Munchausen is the third entry in Gilliam's "Trilogy of Imagination", preceded by Time Bandits (1981) and Brazil (1985). All are about the "craziness of our awkwardly ordered society and the desire to escape it through whatever means possible". Gilliam explained, "The one theme that runs through all three of these pictures is a consistently serious battle between fantasy and what people perceive as reality." All three films focus on these struggles, and attempt to escape them through imagination: Time Bandits, through the eyes of a child, Brazil, through the eyes of a man in his thirties, and Munchausen, through the eyes of an elderly man.

When the production finally came to a successful close, several of the actors commented on the rushed tightness of the whole project. Eric Idle said, "Up until Munchausen, I'd always been very smart about Terry Gilliam films. You don't ever [want to] be in them. Go and see them by all means – but to be in them, fucking madness!!!"

Sarah Polley, who was nine years old at the time of filming, described it as a traumatic experience. "[I]t definitely left me with a few scars... It was just so dangerous. There were so many explosions going off so close to me, which is traumatic for a kid whether it's dangerous or not. Being in freezing cold water for long periods of time and working endless hours. It was physically grueling and unsafe." She further elaborated on her experience in her 2022 memoir, Run Towards the Danger, writing, "Though [Gilliam] was magical and brilliant and made images and stories that will live for a long, long time, it's hard to calculate whether they were worth the price of the hell that so many went through over the years to help him make them."

Nevertheless, on 29 October 2022, she tweeted, "You have my unconditional permission to still love this movie", to people who were wondering whether they could "still like this movie after hearing about [her] horrible experiences working on it as a child"; adding in a second tweet, "Yes, it was traumatic for me. Yes, it should have been handled very differently. Yes, it is still a great movie. The joy that comes from it is the joy I am able to carry with me as well as the terrible memories. So go nuts. Enjoy it. You have my blessing."

Production designer Dante Ferretti afterwards compared Gilliam to a famous director whom Ferretti had worked. "Terry is very similar to Fellini in spirit. Fellini is a wilder liar, but that's the only difference! Terry isn't a director so much as a film author. He is open to every single idea and opportunity to make the end result work. Often the best ideas have come out of something not working properly and coming up with a new concept as a result. He is very elastic and that's one quality in a director that I admire the most."

== Release ==
When The Adventures of Baron Munchausen was completed, David Puttnam, who had obtained the film's US distribution rights for Columbia Pictures, had been replaced as CEO of Columbia; coupled with Gilliam's prior quarrels with major studios over Brazil, the film was given limited distribution in the United States. The film was due to be released in the United States at Christmas 1988 but was withdrawn as Columbia claimed the film would not be ready in time and delayed the release until March 1989. Despite Columbia's earlier claim, the film opened on 8 December 1988 on 252 screens in West Germany and grossed $853,515 in its opening week, finishing third at the box office. It expanded to 317 screens the following week but saw a reduction in gross to $699,000, for a two-week gross of $1.6 million. In its West German release it was required to have a disclaimer stating that the film was different to UFA's 1943 version Münchhausen, following a lawsuit from Allan Buckhantz who claimed to own remake and sequel rights. It grossed $8.1 million in the US and Canada, and £1,917,499 in the United Kingdom.

In Madness and Misadventures, Robin Williams commented on the low number of release prints that Columbia produced, saying, "[Puttnam's] regime was leaving, the new one was going through this, and they said, 'This was their movie, now let's do our movies!' It was a bit like the new lion that comes in and kills all the cubs from the previous man."

Regarding the contemporary press's perception of the film being a financial disaster, Gilliam said in a 2000 interview with IGN, "It seemed actually appropriate that Munchausen—the greatest liar in the world—should be a victim of some of the greatest liars in the world." He compared the film's budget problems to the more serious problems of the film We're No Angels; he went on to declare its difficulties as a mixture of "trade press" still being upset about his battle with Universal over Brazil, nepotism, and an intrigue on behalf of Ray Stark successfully trying to have Puttnam removed from Columbia, coupled with the fact the studio was being sold at the time:

The negative stories about the shoot that were turning up in the Hollywood press were coming, we found out later, from a source at Film Finances—which was the completion bond company on the film. Their lawyer was a guy named Steve Ransohoff, whose father was Martin Ransohoff —who was Ray Stark's friend and partner. [...] I thought it was quite extraordinary, because the stories were doing two things—they were making me and the whole project look like it was completely out of control and all my fault, and that Film Finance, the completion guarantors, were the only thing holding it together—the people trying to bring control to it... the fact was, they were absolutely useless.

The ultimate fact was that when the film was ultimately released, there were only 117 prints made for America—so it was never really released. 117 prints! ...an art film gets 400. We were ultimately the victim of Columbia Tri-Star being sold to Sony, because at that time all they were doing was trying to get the books looking as good as possible. We weren't the only film that suffered, but we were the most visible one. And what happened—to complete the story in a neat and tidy way—was that they were not spending any money on advertising to promote any of the movies started by the previous regime—by Putnam's regime. They were burying films left right and center by spending no money on them—and the books looked really good at the end of that.

The joke is, if you look back, we got the best reviews and we were doing the best business in the opening weeks of any film they had released since Last Emperor. We actually opened well in the big cities—we opened really well. A friend who had bought the video rights said he had never seen anything so weird—Columbia was spending their whole time looking at exit polls to prove the film would not work in the suburbs, and so it would be pointless to make any more prints. He said, "I've never seen anything like this." There it was. Then it becomes this kind of legend—which it deserves to be... even if it's the wrong legend.

== Reception ==
On the review aggregator website Rotten Tomatoes, the film holds an approval rating of 90% based on 60 reviews, with an average rating of 7.3/10. The website's critics consensus reads, "Bursting with Terry Gilliam's typically imaginative flourishes, this story of a possibly deranged Baron recounting his storied life is a flamboyant and witty visual treat." Metacritic, which uses a weighted average, assigned the film a score of 69 out of 100, based on 15 critics, indicating "generally favorable" reviews. Audiences polled by CinemaScore gave the film an average grade of "A−" on an A+ to F scale.

Regarding the gap between the film's troubled production and its eventual triumph of aesthetic cinematic form on the screen, Jeff Swindoll wrote in his 2008 DVD review of Munchausen for Monsters and Critics: "For the absolute hell that the production of the film turned out to be, you really don't see any of that tension on the screen... the film is a fantastic, whimsical treat... Baron Munchausen is full of whimsy, fantasy, bright colors, and fabulous characters. None is as fantastic as the Baron himself as played, with a twinkle in his eye, by the grand John Neville."

Roger Ebert of the Chicago Sun-Times gave the film three stars out of four, finding that it was "told with a cheerfulness and a light touch that never betray the time and money it took to create them", appreciating "the sly wit and satire that sneaks in here and there from director Terry Gilliam and his collaborators, who were mostly forged in the mill of Monty Python". While considering the film's special effects as "astonishing", Ebert also contended that "the movie is slow to get off the ground", and "sometimes the movie fails on the basic level of making itself clear. We're not always sure who is who, how they are related, or why we should care." But "allowing for the unsuccessful passages there is a lot here to treasure". Ebert concluded, "This is a vast and commodious work... the wit and the spectacle of Baron Munchausen are considerable achievements." Additionally, he considered John Neville's title role performance as appearing "sensible and matter-of-fact, as anyone would if they had spent a lifetime growing accustomed to the incredible".

Hal Hinson of The Washington Post called the film a "wondrous feat of imagination", although, "except for Williams, the actors are never more than a detail in Gilliam's compositions".

Richard Corliss of Time wrote, "Everything about Munchausen deserves exclamation points, and not just to clear the air of the odor of corporate flop sweat. So here it is! A lavish fairy tale for bright children of all ages! Proof that eccentric films can survive in today's off-the-rack Hollywood! The most inventive fantasy since, well, Brazil! You may not believe it, ladies and gentlemen, but it's all true."

Vincent Canby of The New York Times called the film "consistently imaginative" and a "spectacle [that] is indeed spectacular and worth the admission price and patches of boredom". He said that the "major credit must go to Giuseppe Rotunno, the cameraman; Dante Ferretti, the production designer; Richard Conway, who did the special effects, and Peerless Camera Company Ltd., responsible for the optical effects. Without them, Baron Munchausen would have looked about as big and as interesting as a 25-cent postage stamp."

In July 2019, the film was ranked 12th in a Rotten Tomatoes list of "38 Moon Movies to Celebrate the Moon Landing".

=== Accolades ===
| Award | Year | Category | Recipient(s) | Result | Ref. |
|---|---|---|---|---|---|
| Academy Awards | 1990 | Best Art Direction | Dante Ferretti and Francesca Lo Schiavo | Nominated | |
| Academy Awards | 1990 | Best Costume Design | Gabriella Pescucci | Nominated | |
| Academy Awards | 1990 | Best Makeup | Maggie Weston and Fabrizio Sforza | Nominated | |
| Academy Awards | 1990 | Best Visual Effects | Richard Conway and Kent Houston | Nominated | |
| British Academy Film Awards | 1990 | Best Costume Design | Gabriella Pescucci | Won | |
| British Academy Film Awards | 1990 | Best Makeup and Hair | Maggie Weston, Fabrizio Sforza and Pam Meager | Won | |
| British Academy Film Awards | 1990 | Best Production Design | Dante Ferretti | Won | |
| British Academy Film Awards | 1990 | Best Special Visual Effects | Kent Houston and Richard Conway | Nominated | |
| Hugo Awards | 1990 | Best Dramatic Presentation | The Adventures of Baron Munchausen | Nominated | |
| Nastro d'Argento | 1990 | Best Cinematography | Giuseppe Rotunno | Won | |
| Nastro d'Argento | 1990 | Best Production Design | Dante Ferretti | Won | |
| Nastro d'Argento | 1990 | Best Costume Design | Gabriella Pescucci | Won | |
| Youth in Film Awards | 1990 | Best Family Motion Picture Family Musical or Fantasy | The Adventures of Baron Munchausen | Nominated | |
| Youth in Film Awards | 1990 | Best Young Actress Starring in a Motion Picture | Sarah Polley | Nominated | |
| Saturn Awards | 1991 | Best Fantasy Film | The Adventures of Baron Munchausen | Nominated | |
| Saturn Awards | 1991 | Best Costumes | Gabriella Pescucci | Nominated | |
| Saturn Awards | 1991 | Best Makeup | Maggie Weston and Fabrizio Sforza | Nominated | |
| Saturn Awards | 1991 | Best Special Effects | Richard Conway and Kent Houston | Nominated | |

=== Home media ===
A Criterion Collection LaserDisc was released with features, such as a commentary track by Gilliam and deleted scenes. The first DVD edition of the film, issued 27 April 1999, did not include any of these nor any other extras.

A 20th anniversary edition was released on DVD and Blu-ray on 8 April 2008. It included a new commentary with Gilliam and co-writer/actor McKeown, a three-part documentary on the making of the film, storyboard sequences, and deleted scenes.

The Criterion Collection released the film on 4K Ultra HD and Blu-ray on 3 January 2023, with bonus features.

== Comic book ==
The film was adapted into a comic series in 1989 by NOW Comics: The Adventures of Baron Munchausen – The Four-Part Mini-Series.

== See also ==
- A True Story, an ancient Greek novel (2nd century AD), in which the protagonist meets the king of the moon and is later swallowed by a whale.
