= Ron Kovic =

American activist and writer (born 1946)

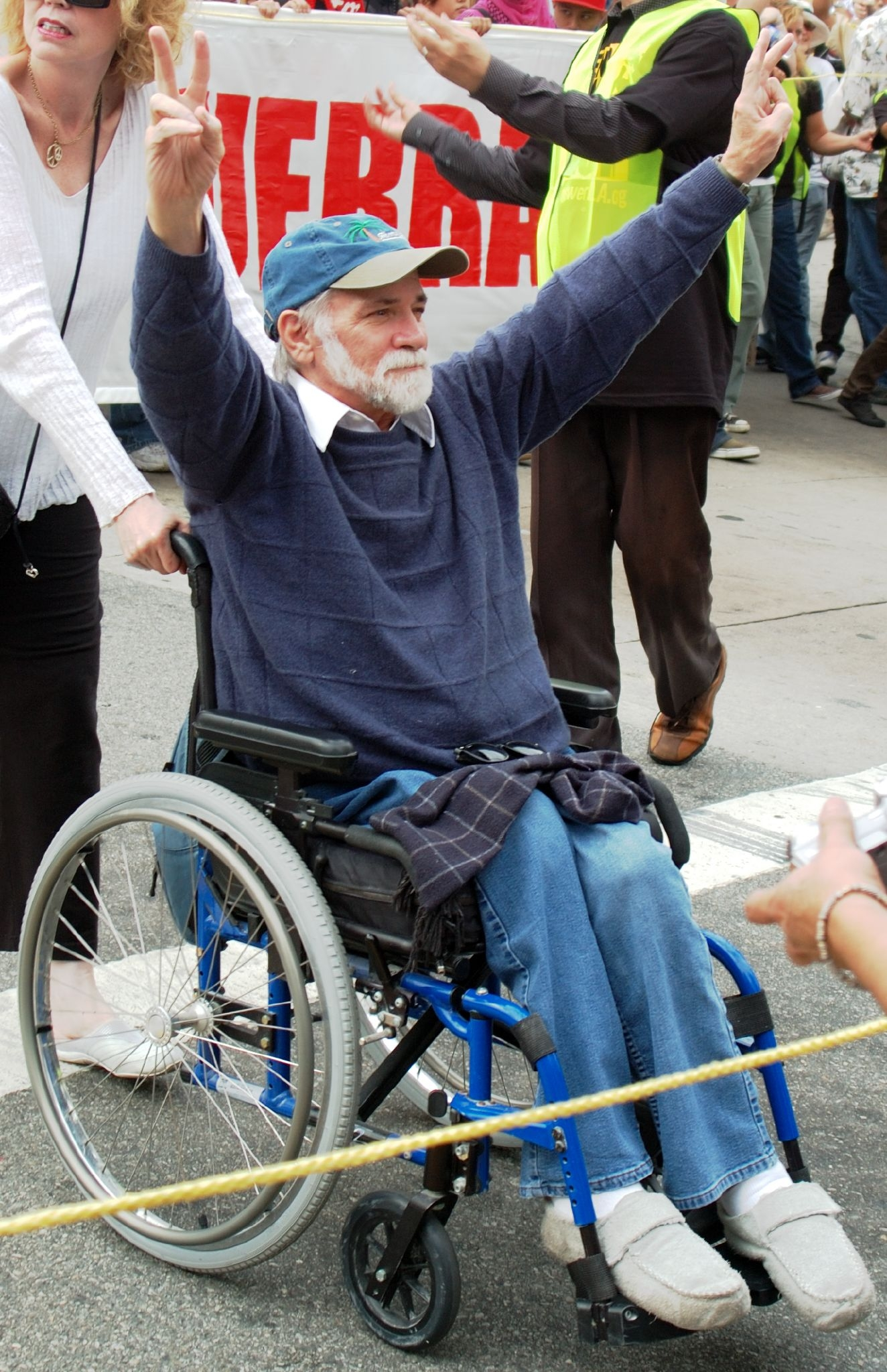
- Ron Kovic at an anti-war rally in Los Angeles, California, on October 12, 2007.
- Born: Ronald Lawrence Kovic; July 4, 1946 (age 80); Ladysmith, Wisconsin, U.S.
- Occupations: Activist; author; Marine
- Military career
- Allegiance: United States
- Branch: United States Marine Corps
- Service years: 1964–1968
- Rank: Sergeant
- Units: 3/7 Marines; 1st Recon Bn; 2nd MAW
- Conflicts: Vietnam War

Ronald Lawrence Kovic (born July 4, 1946) is an American anti-war activist, author, and United States Marine Corps sergeant who was wounded and paralyzed in the Vietnam War. His best selling 1976 memoir Born on the Fourth of July was made into the 1989 film of the same name which starred Tom Cruise as Kovic and was co-written by Kovic and directed by Oliver Stone.

Kovic received the Golden Globe Award for Best Screenplay on January 20, 1990, 22 years to the day after his being wounded in Vietnam. The work was also nominated for Best Adapted Screenplay for the Academy Award, BAFTA Award, and the Writers Guild of America Award.

== Early life ==
Kovic was born in Ladysmith, Wisconsin, the second of six children of Patricia Ann Lamb (January 6, 1923 – June 30, 2006) and Eli Thomas Kovic (August 3, 1920 – May 1, 1999). Eli met Patricia while serving in the Navy during the Second World War. Both of them had enlisted shortly after the 1941 attack on Pearl Harbor. Eli was of Croatian ancestry and Patricia was of Irish ancestry. He managed a supermarket, while she was a homemaker. Kovic grew up in Massapequa, New York, and graduated in 1964 from Massapequa High School on Long Island.

== Military service in Vietnam ==
After his high school graduation, Kovic enlisted in the Marine Corps and completed basic training at Parris Island, South Carolina. A year of stateside service followed, and then he volunteered for combat duty in Vietnam and was sent to South Vietnam in December 1965 as part of H&S Company, 3rd Battalion, 7th Marines, 1st Marine Division. In June 1966, he was transferred to Second Platoon, Bravo Company, 1st Reconnaissance Battalion, 1st Marine Division with which Kovic participated in 22 long-range reconnaissance patrols in enemy territory and was awarded the Navy Commendation Medal with Combat "V" for valor. After a 13-month tour of duty, Kovic returned stateside on January 15, 1967 and was subsequently assigned to the 2nd Marine Aircraft Wing at Cherry Point, North Carolina. Several months later, after his promotion to the rank of Sergeant, and after observing some anti-Vietnam War demonstrations at home, which at the time he abhorred, Kovic volunteered to return to Vietnam for a second tour of duty.

On January 20, 1968, while leading a reconnaissance force of battalion scouts from the 1st Amtrac Battalion just north of the Cửa Việt River in the vicinity of the village of Mỹ Lộc, in the Demilitarized Zone, Kovic's squad encountered the NVA 803rd Regiment and elements of a Viet Cong battalion that was besieging the village. He was shot by NVA soldiers while leading his rifle squad across an open area, attempting to aid the South Vietnamese Popular Force unit in the village. Deserted by most of his unit, Kovic was shot first in the right foot, which tore out the back of his heel, then again through the right shoulder, suffering a collapsed lung and a spinal cord injury that left him paralyzed from the chest down. The first Marine who tried to rescue him was shot through the heart and killed, before a second Marine carried Kovic to safety through heavy enemy fire. Kovic spent a week in an intensive care ward in Da Nang. Then he was flown home and spent more than a year undergoing medical care and rehabilitation at the Veterans Administration Hospital in the Bronx, New York. As a result of his service and wounds in the conflict, Kovic was awarded the Bronze Star with Combat "V" for heroism in battle and the Purple Heart.

== Post-Vietnam activism ==
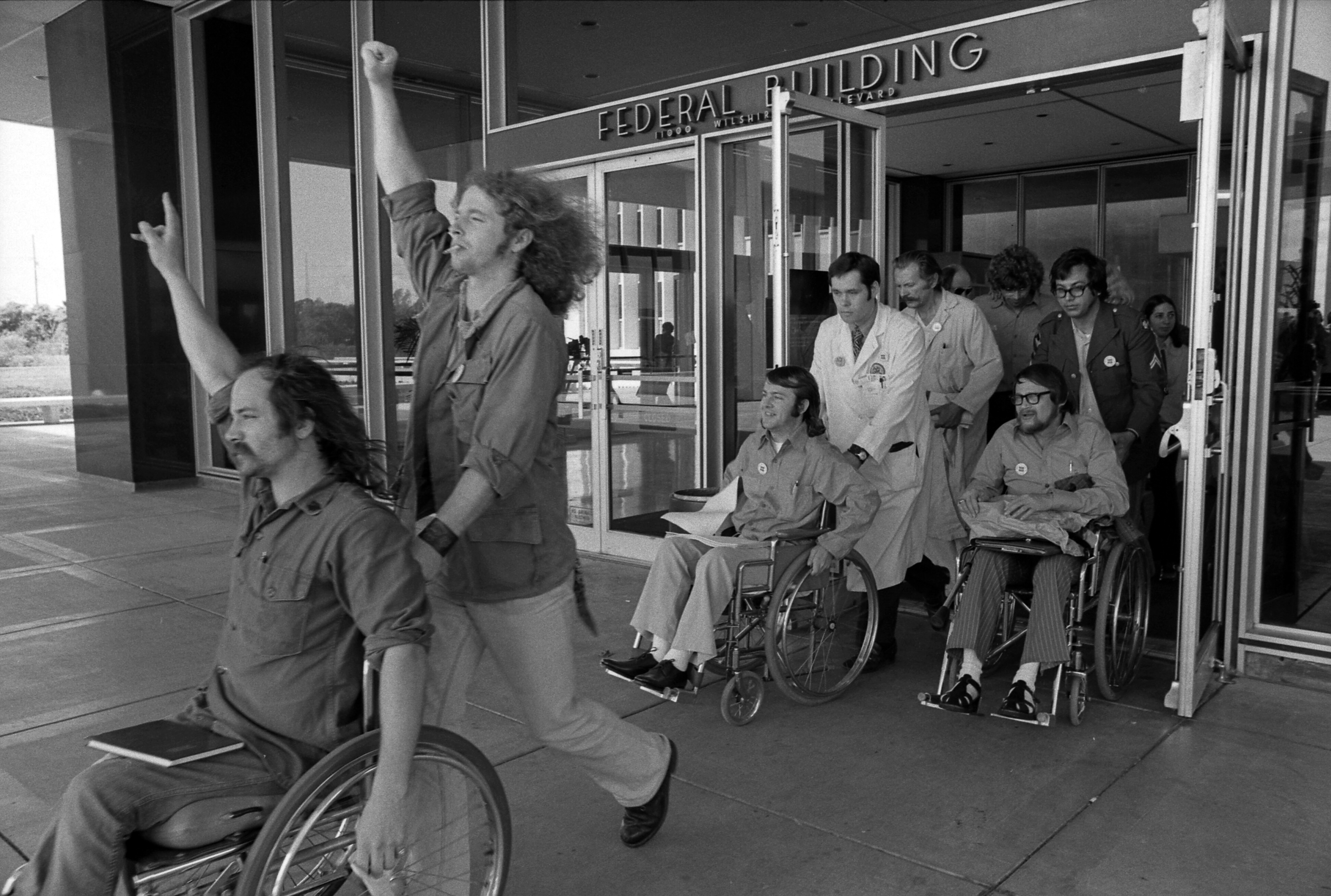
Kovic (left) leading other disabled veterans after ending their 17-day hunger strike, March 1974

Before the end of the war in Vietnam was declared on April 30, 1975, Kovic became one of the best-known peace activists among the Vietnam veterans and was arrested 12 times for participating in anti-war demonstrations. He attended his first peace demonstration soon after the Kent State shootings in May 1970. That same spring, Kovic’s first speech against the war at Levittown Memorial High School in Levittown, Long Island, New York was interrupted by a bomb threat and the auditorium was cleared. Undeterred, Kovic continued speaking to students from the school's football grandstands.

His first arrest was during a demonstration at an Orange County, California draft board office in the spring of 1971. He refused to leave the office, explaining to a board member that by sending young men to Vietnam, the board was inadvertently "condemning them to their death", or to be wounded and maimed like himself in a war that he had come to believe was "immoral and made no sense". Kovic was told that if he did not leave the draft board office immediately, he would be arrested. He refused to leave and was removed by the police.

In 1974, Kovic led a group of disabled Vietnam War veterans in wheelchairs on a 17-day hunger strike inside the Los Angeles office of Senator Alan Cranston. The veterans protested the "poor treatment in America's veterans' hospitals and demanded better treatment for returning veterans, a full investigation of all Veterans Administration (VA) facilities, and a direct meeting with the Director of the VA, Donald E. Johnson. The strike continued to escalate until Johnson finally agreed to fly out from Washington, D.C. and meet with Kovic and the other veterans. The hunger strike ended soon afterwards. Several months later, Johnson resigned from his post. In late August 1974, Kovic traveled to Belfast, Northern Ireland, where he spent a week in the Roman Catholic stronghold of "Turf Lodge", interviewing both political activists and residents. In the spring of 1975, Kovic, author Richard Boyle, and photo journalist Loretta Smith traveled to Cambodia to cover the Cambodian Civil War for Pacific News Service.

On the night of July 15, 1976, at the Democratic National Convention at Madison Square Garden in New York City, Kovic spoke from the podium seconding the nomination of draft resister Fritz Efaw for Vice President of the United States.

In 1990, Kovic considered running for a seat in the House of Representatives as a Democrat against California Republican Bob Dornan, but he ultimately decided not to run.

From 1990 to 1991, Kovic participated in several anti-war demonstrations against the first Gulf War, which occurred not long after the release of his biographical film in 1989. In early May 1999, following the U.S. bombing of the Chinese embassy in Belgrade, Serbia, Kovic met with China's ambassador to the United States Li Zhaoxing at the Chinese embassy in Washington, D.C. to express his condolences and present the ambassador and his staff with two dozen red roses. He was an outspoken critic of the Iraq War.

=== Since 2000 ===
In November 2003, Kovic joined protests in London against the visit of George W. Bush. He was the guest of honor at a reception held at London's City Hall by Mayor Ken Livingstone. The following day, he led a march of several hundred thousand demonstrators on Trafalgar Square, where a huge rally was held to protest the visit of George W. Bush and the war in Iraq. Kovic attended the 2008 Democratic National Convention in Denver, Colorado. On Sunday, August 24, 2008, the day before the convention began, Kovic spoke, then led thousands in a march against the war which ended with him saying, "In the city of Denver, we got welcomed home."

In a new introduction to his book, Born on the Fourth of July (1976), written in March 2005, Kovic stated, "I wanted people to understand. I wanted to share with them as nakedly and openly and intimately as possible what I had gone through, what I had endured. I wanted them to know what it really meant to be in a war, to be shot and wounded, to be fighting for my life on the intensive care ward, not the myth we had grown up believing. I wanted people to know about the hospitals and the enema room, about why I had become opposed to the war, why I had grown more and more committed to peace and nonviolence. I had been beaten by the police and arrested twelve times for protesting the war and I had spent many nights in jail in my wheelchair. I had been called a Communist and a traitor, simply for trying to tell the truth about what had happened in that war, but I refused to be intimidated." In 1989, on the last day of filming of Born on the Fourth of July, Kovic presented actor Tom Cruise, who portrayed him in the movie, the original Bronze Star he had received, explaining to Cruise that he was giving him the medal as a gift "for his heroic performance".

Kovic lives in Redondo Beach, California, where he writes, paints, plays the piano, and gardens. He had a close relationship with Connie Panzarino, author of The Me in the Mirror.

== Legacy ==
Bruce Springsteen wrote the song "Shut Out the Light" after reading Kovic's memoir and then meeting him.

Military Awards: Bronze Star with Combat V, Purple Heart, Navy Commendation Medal with Combat V, Vietnam Service Medal, National Defense Service Medal, Vietnam Campaign Medal, Good Conduct Medal.

== Films ==
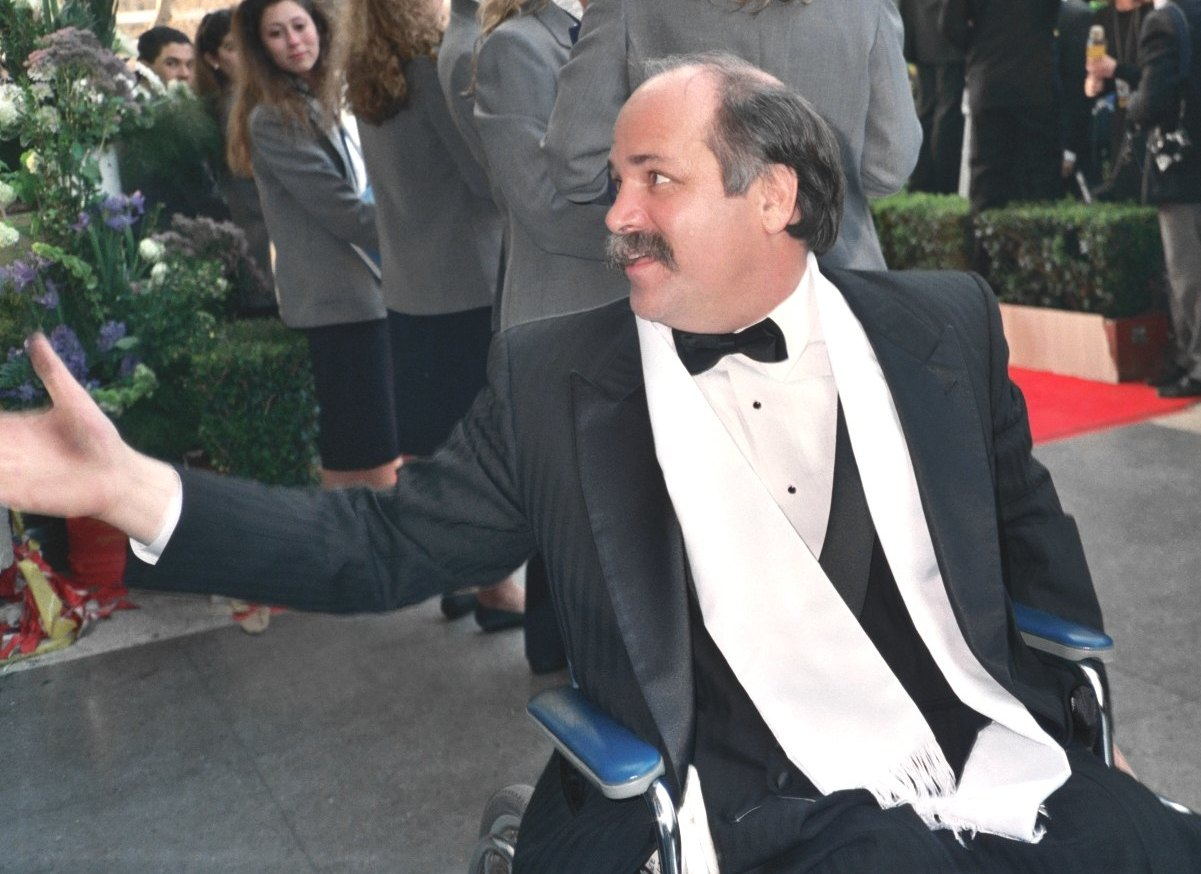
Kovic at the 62nd Academy Awards, March 26, 1990

- 1989 – Born on the Fourth of July - (co-screenwriter with Oliver Stone). Directed by Oliver Stone. Kovic also has a brief cameo appearance in the film as a wheelchair-using soldier in the opening parade scene who flinches as firecrackers explode, something Tom Cruise's Kovic will also do later in the film.

== See also ==
- Born on the Fourth of July – Autobiography of Ron Kovic
- G.I. coffeehouses – Antiwar coffeehouses near U.S. military bases during and after the Vietnam War
- GI Underground Press – Military press produced without official approval
- List of Croatian Americans
- List of peace activists
- Vietnam Veterans Against the War – American nonprofit organization
- Brian Willson – American Vietnam veteran & peace activist (born 1941), another Vietnam war veteran, peace activist and paraplegic who was born in America on the Fourth of July
- Pavel Filatyev
- Ron Kovic - Warum verschwindest du nicht?, a 1977 filmed portrait by Georg Stefan Troller for German television
