= David Brenner (film editor) =

American film editor (1962–2022)

David Brenner ACE
- Born: David S. Brenner; November 3, 1962; Hollywood, California, U.S.
- Died: February 17, 2022 (aged 59); West Hollywood, California, U.S.
- Occupation: Film editor
- Spouse: Amber Dixon Brenner (m. 2003)
- Children: 3

David S. Brenner (November 3, 1962 – February 17, 2022) was an American film editor known for being one of Oliver Stone's "hot shot" up-and-coming film editors, along with Joe Hutshing, Pietro Scalia, and Julie Monroe. He attended North Hollywood High School and Stanford University before serving as an apprentice editor on the film Radioactive Dreams (1984). He was an assistant editor to Claire Simpson on his next three films, and became a full editor afterwards. Brenner was elected as a member of the American Cinema Editors and won the Academy Award for Best Film Editing for Born on the Fourth of July (1989). He died at home at age 59. His penultimate film, Avatar: The Way of Water (2022), is dedicated to his memory.

== Filmography ==
Year	Film	Director	Notes
1984	Radioactive Dreams	Albert Pyun	Apprentice editor
1986	Salvador	Oliver Stone	Assistant editor to Claire Simpson
1986	Platoon	Oliver Stone	Assistant editor to Claire Simpson
1987	Wall Street	Oliver Stone	Assistant editor to Claire Simpson
1988	Talk Radio	Oliver Stone	Co-editor with Joe Hutshing
1989	Born on the Fourth of July	Oliver Stone	Co-editor with Joe Hutshing; Academy Award for Best Film Editing (Youngest winner of the category)
1991	The Doors	Oliver Stone	Co-editor with Joe Hutshing
1992	Night and the City	Irwin Winkler	
1993	Heaven & Earth	Oliver Stone	Co-editor with Sally Menke
1994	The River Wild	Curtis Hanson	Co-editor with Joe Hutshing
1996	Fear	James Foley	
1996	Independence Day	Roland Emmerich	Satellite Award for Best Editing
1997	Lolita	Adrian Lyne	Co-editor with Julie Monroe
1998	What Dreams May Come	Vincent Ward	
2000	The Patriot	Roland Emmerich	Co-editor with Julie Monroe
2001	Kate & Leopold	James Mangold	
2003	Identity	James Mangold	
2004	The Day After Tomorrow	Roland Emmerich	
2006	World Trade Center	Oliver Stone	Co-editor with Julie Monroe
2008	Wanted	Timur Bekmambetov	
2009	2012	Roland Emmerich	Co-editor with Peter S. Elliot
2010	Wall Street: Money Never Sleeps	Oliver Stone	Co-editor with Julie Monroe
2011	Pirates of the Caribbean: On Stranger Tides	Rob Marshall	Co-editor with Wyatt Smith
2013	Man of Steel	Zack Snyder	
2014	300: Rise of an Empire	Noam Murro	Co-editor with Wyatt Smith
2014	Escobar: Paradise Lost	Andrea Di Stefano	Co-editor with Maryline Monthieux
2016	Batman v Superman: Dawn of Justice	Zack Snyder	
2017	Justice League	Zack Snyder; Joss Whedon	Co-editor with Richard Pearson and Martin Walsh
2021	Zack Snyder's Justice League	Zack Snyder	
2022	Avatar: The Way of Water	James Cameron	Posthumous release; co-editor with Stephen E. Rivkin, John Refoua, and James Cameron.
2025	Avatar: Fire and Ash	James Cameron	Posthumous release; co-editor with Stephen E. Rivkin, Nicolas de Toth, John Refoua, Jason Gaudio, and James Cameron

== Awards and nominations ==
Award	Year	Work	Category	Notes	Result
Academy Awards	1990	Born on the Fourth of July	Best Film Editing	Shared with Joe Hutshing (Youngest winner of the category)	Won
ACE Eddie Awards	1990	Born on the Fourth of July	Best Edited Feature Film	Shared with Joe Hutshing	Nominated
Critics' Choice Awards	2023	Avatar: The Way of Water	Best Editing	Shared with James Cameron, John Refoua, and Stephen E. Rivkin	Nominated
San Diego Film Critics Society	2023	Avatar: The Way of Water	Best Editing	Shared with James Cameron, John Refoua, Stephen E. Rivkin, and Ian Silverstein	Nominated
Satellite Awards	1998	Independence Day	Best Editing		Won
Satellite Awards	2009	2012	Best Editing	Shared with Peter S. Elliot	Nominated
Saturn Awards	2024	Avatar: The Way of Water	Best Editing	Shared with James Cameron, John Refoua, and Stephen E. Rivkin	Nominated
