= Richard Conway (special effects artist) =

American special effects artist (1942–2021)

- Born: 15 January 1942
- Died: 22 December 2021 (aged 79)
- Occupation: Visual effects artist
- Years active: 1966–2015

Richard Conway (15 January 1942 – 22 December 2021) was an English special effects artist who was nominated at the 62nd Academy Awards in the category of Best Visual Effects for his work on the film The Adventures of Baron Munchausen. His nomination was shared with Kent Houston.

He worked on over 65 films and TV shows from 1966 until 2015. Conway won two Primetime Emmy Awards. The first was for Merlin, and the second was for Alice in Wonderland. He also won a BAFTA award for Brazil.

Conway died on 22 December 2021, at the age of 79.

His son, Sam Conway, was the special effects supervisor on HBO's Game of Thrones and was a winner of three Primetime Emmy Awards.
