= Joe Hutshing =

American film editor

Joe Hutshing is an American film editor and is best known for working multiple times with film director, Oliver Stone, film director Nancy Meyers and film director Cameron Crowe. Hutshing graduated from the University of Oregon in 1980.

Hutshing has received Academy Awards for the films Born on the Fourth of July (1989) and JFK (1991); both were directed by Oliver Stone. He also received a BAFTA for Best Film Editing on JFK, as well as an Emmy for Outstanding Picture Editing on Live From Baghdad. His greatest commercial successes have been The Tourist, which grossed 278 million dollars, and Jerry Maguire, which grossed 274 million dollars worldwide.

Hutshing has been elected to membership in the American Cinema Editors.

== Selected filmography ==
Editor
Year	Film	Director	Notes
1988	Talk Radio	Oliver Stone	Second collaboration with Oliver Stone
1989	Born on the Fourth of July	Oliver Stone	Third collaboration with Oliver Stone
1991	The Doors	Oliver Stone	Fourth collaboration with Oliver Stone
1991	JFK	Oliver Stone	Fifth collaboration with Oliver Stone
1993	Indecent Proposal	Adrian Lyne	
1994	The River Wild	Curtis Hanson	
1995	French Kiss	Lawrence Kasdan	
1996	Broken Arrow	John Woo	
1996	Jerry Maguire	Cameron Crowe	First collaboration with Cameron Crowe
1998	Meet Joe Black	Martin Brest	
2000	Almost Famous	Cameron Crowe	Second collaboration with Cameron Crowe
2001	Vanilla Sky	Cameron Crowe	Third collaboration with Cameron Crowe
2003	Something's Gotta Give	Nancy Meyers	First collaboration with Nancy Meyers
2005	The Skeleton Key	Iain Softley	
2006	The Holiday	Nancy Meyers	Second collaboration with Nancy Meyers
2007	Lions for Lambs	Robert Redford	
2008	W.	Oliver Stone	Sixth collaboration with Oliver Stone
2009	It's Complicated	Nancy Meyers	Third collaboration with Nancy Meyers
2010	The Tourist	Florian Henckel von Donnersmarck	
2012	Savages	Oliver Stone	Seventh collaboration with Oliver Stone
2013	Metallica: Through the Never	Nimród Antal	
2015	Aloha	Cameron Crowe	Fifth collaboration with Cameron Crowe
2017	Crown Heights	Matt Ruskin	
2017	The Greatest Showman	Michael Gracey	
2018	Robin Hood	Otto Bathurst	

Editorial department
Year	Film	Director	Role	Notes
1983	Valley Girl	Martha Coolidge	First assistant editor	
1984	Radioactive Dreams	Albert Pyun	Assistant editor	
1986	Welcome to 18	Terry Carr	Assistant editor	
1987	Wall Street	Oliver Stone	Associate editor: Los Angeles	First collaboration with Oliver Stone
1999	Being John Malkovich	Spike Jonze	Additional editor	
2011	We Bought a Zoo	Cameron Crowe	Additional editor	Fourth collaboration with Cameron Crowe
2016	The Birth of a Nation	Nate Parker	Additional editor	
2016	Independence Day: Resurgence	Roland Emmerich	Additional editor	

Sound department
Year	Film	Director	Role	Notes
1986	Ferris Bueller's Day Off	John Hughes	Assistant sound editor	Uncredited
1987	The Princess Bride	Rob Reiner	Sound assistant	

Thanks
Year	Film	Director	Role
2019	Brittany Runs a Marathon	Paul Downs Colaizzo	The filmmakers wish to thank
2021	Music	Sia	The producers wish to thank

TV movies

Editor
Year	Film	Director
2002	Live from Baghdad	Mick Jackson

Editorial department
Year	Film	Director	Role
1985	The Blue Yonder	Mark Rosman	First assistant editor
1986	Time Flyer	Mark Rosman	First assistant editor

TV series

Editor
Year	Title	Notes
2016	Roadies	1 episode

== Academy Award nominations and wins ==
- 1990 – Born on the Fourth of July (won) Best Film Editing w/ co-editor David Brenner
- 1992 – JFK (won) Best Film Editing w/ co-editor, Pietro Scalia
- 1997 – Jerry Maguire (nominated) Best Film Editing
- 2001 – Almost Famous (nominated) Best Editing w/ co-editor, Saar Klein

== Other award nominations and wins ==
- 1990 – Born on the Fourth of July (nominated) American Cinema Editors ACE Eddie - Best Edited Feature Film w/ co-editor David Brenner
- 1992 – JFK (won) American Cinema Editors ACE Eddie - Best Edited Feature Film w/ co-editor, Pietro Scalia
- 1993 – JFK (won) BAFTA Film Award - Best Editing w/ co-editor, Pietro Scalia
- 2001 – Almost Famous (won) American Cinema Editors ACE Eddie - Best Edited Feature Film - Comedy or Musical w/ co-editor, Saar Klein
- 2001 – Almost Famous (nominated) Las Vegas Film Critics Society Awards - Sierra Award - Best Editing w/ co-editor, Saar Klein
- 2003 – Live from Baghdad (2002) (TV) (won) Emmy Award - Outstanding Single Camera Picture Editing for a Miniseries, Movie or a Special
- 2003 – Live from Baghdad (2002) (TV) (nominated) American Cinema Editors ACE Eddie - Best Edited Motion Picture for Non-Commercial Television
