= Fine Food, Fine Pastries, Open 6 to 9 =

1989 film

- Directed by: David Petersen
- Produced by: David Petersen
- Distributed by: Direct Cinema Limited
- Release date: 1989
- Running time: 29 minutes
- Country: United States
- Language: English

Fine Food, Fine Pastries, Open 6 to 9 is a 1989 American short documentary film produced and directed by David Petersen.

== Summary ==
The film follows the owners and waitresses of Sherrill's Restaurant and Bakery, a neighborhood gathering place located behind the Capitol. Through scenes from a typical day, it portrays the restaurant’s role in the Capitol Hill community, where patrons reflect on local history and politics. The film also captures how the restaurant and its patrons observed Washington and its residents from the Depression onward.

== Accolades ==
It was nominated in 1989 for an Academy Award for Best Documentary Short. It also was a first place winner in the American, National Educational, and Houston Film Festivals; and won a CINE Golden Eagle and Emmy Award.

== See also ==
- Eateries
- 1989 in film
- Diners
