= Kent Houston =

New Zealand visual effects artist

- Occupation: Visual effects artist

Kent Houston (born in September 1951) is a New Zealand visual effects artist. He was nominated for an Academy Award in the category Best Visual Effects for the film The Adventures of Baron Munchausen.

In addition to his Academy Award nomination, he won a Primetime Emmy Award in the category Outstanding Special Visual Effects in a Supporting Role for his work on the television program The Alienist.

== Selected filmography ==
- The Adventures of Baron Munchausen (1989; co-nominated with Richard Conway)
