= Born on the Fourth of July =

Autobiography of Ron Kovic

- Author: Ron Kovic
- Publisher: McGraw Hill
- Publication date: 1976

Born on the Fourth of July is an autobiography by Ron Kovic, a paralyzed Vietnam War veteran who became an anti-war activist, published in 1976. Kovic was born on July 4, 1946, and his book's ironic title echoed a famous line from George M. Cohan's patriotic 1904 song, "The Yankee Doodle Boy" (also known as "Yankee Doodle Dandy"). The book was adapted into the 1989 Academy Award-winning film of the same name directed and co-written by Oliver Stone and Ron Kovic, starring Tom Cruise as Kovic.

== Origin ==
Born on the Fourth of July was written in Santa Monica, California, during the fall of 1974 in exactly one month, three weeks and two days. It tells the story of Kovic's life growing up in Massapequa, New York, joining the United States Marine Corps right out of high school, going to Vietnam for two tours of duty, getting shot, finding himself paralyzed and in need of a wheelchair, and eventually starting a new life as a peace activist.

I wrote all night long, seven days a week, single space, no paragraphs, front and back of the pages, pounding the keys so hard the tips of my fingers would hurt. I couldn't stop writing, and I remember feeling more alive than I had ever felt. Convinced that I was destined to die young, I struggled to leave something of meaning behind, to rise above the darkness and despair. I wanted people to understand. I wanted to share with them as nakedly and openly and intimately as possible what I had gone through, what I had endured. I wanted them to know what it really meant to be in a war — to be shot and wounded, to be fighting for my life on the intensive care ward — not the myth we had grown up believing. I wanted people to know about the hospitals and the enema room, about why I had become opposed to the war, why I had grown more and more committed to peace and nonviolence.

— Ron Kovic, on writing his autobiography.

== Differences from the film adaptation ==
- Ron Kovic is shown to have confessed his supposed role in the Marine Corporal's accidental death to the deceased man's sympathetic parents and widow, who admits that she cannot find it in her heart to forgive him, but God might do so. In reality, this meeting never happened, but director Stone admits this was done to add to the inner conflict Kovic was going through and to give him some closure.
- Kyra Sedgwick's character of Donna, Ron's on-screen high school sweetheart, never existed and did not inspire him to become an anti-war activist. The film portrays Kovic watching her protest after the Kent State Shootings and get beaten up by police. Although Kovic did not witness the protest in person, he nevertheless did watch the event on television, and the memoir states that he was outraged by the treatment of the protesters, much like his feelings towards the treatment of his fellow veterans.

== Cultural references ==
- Bruce Springsteen dedicated his 1978 performance of "Darkness on the Edge of Town" live at Winterland to Kovic, saying that he read Born on the Fourth of July, and "loved the book a whole lot". He frequently mentions the book, and his chance meeting with Kovic, before playing his song "Shut Out the Light". However Springsteen in his autobiography and Broadway show says he first read the book in 1980.
- Folk musician Tom Paxton adapted the book into a song of the same title on his 1977 album New Songs from the Briarpatch, and met Kovic backstage at the Bottom Line Club in New York City the same year.
- American punk rock band Green Day references the title of the film in their 2009 song "21st Century Breakdown".
- American punk rock band The Gaslight Anthem references the title of the film in their 2014 song "Rollin' and Tumblin'" on the album Get Hurt.
- British singer Ed Sheeran references the title of the film in his rap verse in Taylor Swift's 2017 song "End Game".

== See also ==
- Births on July 4th
