= Boston Society of Film Critics Awards 1989 =

Annual US film awards ceremony

10th BSFC Awards

1990

Best Film:
Crimes and Misdemeanors

The 10th Boston Society of Film Critics Awards honored the best filmmaking of 1989. The awards were given in 1990.

== Winners ==
- Best Film:
  - Crimes and Misdemeanors
- Best Actor:
  - Daniel Day-Lewis – My Left Foot
- Best Actress:
  - Jessica Tandy – Driving Miss Daisy
- Best Supporting Actor:
  - Danny Aiello – Do the Right Thing
- Best Supporting Actress:
  - Brenda Fricker – My Left Foot
- Best Director:
  - Woody Allen – Crimes and Misdemeanors
- Best Screenplay:
  - Woody Allen – Crimes and Misdemeanors
- Best Cinematography:
  - Michael Ballhaus – The Fabulous Baker Boys
- Best Documentary:
  - Let's Get Lost
- Best Foreign-Language Film:
  - Story of Women (Une affaire de femmes) • France
