= 47th Golden Globe Awards =

Film award ceremony in 1990

- Date: January 20, 1990
- Site: Beverly Hilton Hotel; Beverly Hills, Los Angeles, California
- Hosted by: Sam Elliott; Cybill Shepherd

Highlights
- Best Film: Drama: Born on the Fourth of July
- Best Film: Musical or Comedy: Driving Miss Daisy
- Best Drama Series: China Beach
- Best Musical or Comedy Series: Murphy Brown
- Most awards: (4) Born on the Fourth of July
- Most nominations: (5) Born on the Fourth of July; Glory; When Harry Met Sally...

Television coverage
- Network: TBS SuperStation

The 47th Golden Globe Awards, honoring the best in film and television for 1989, were held on January 20, 1990 at the Beverly Hilton. The nominations were announced on December 27, 1989.

== Winners and nominees ==
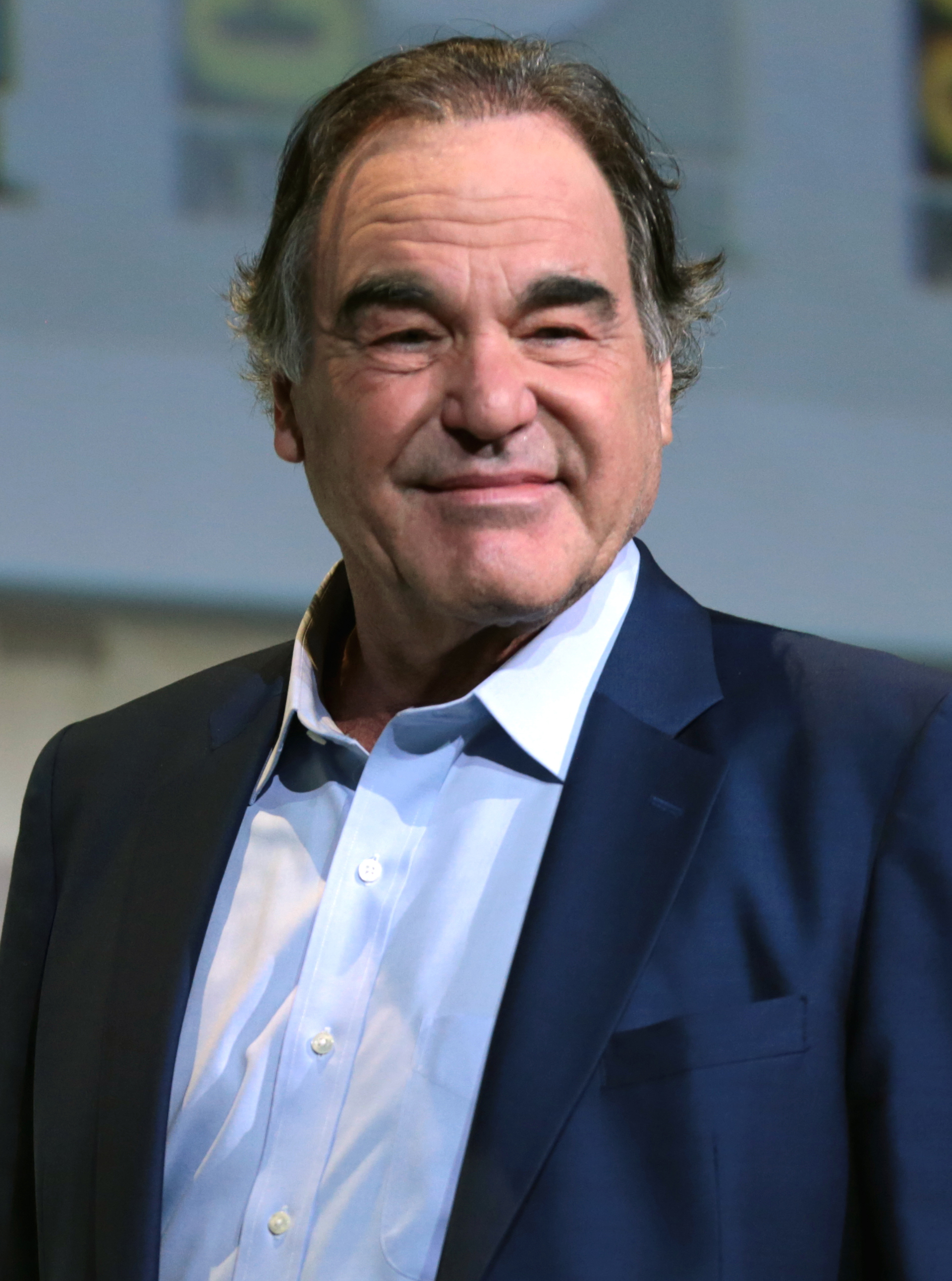
Oliver Stone — Best Director, winner

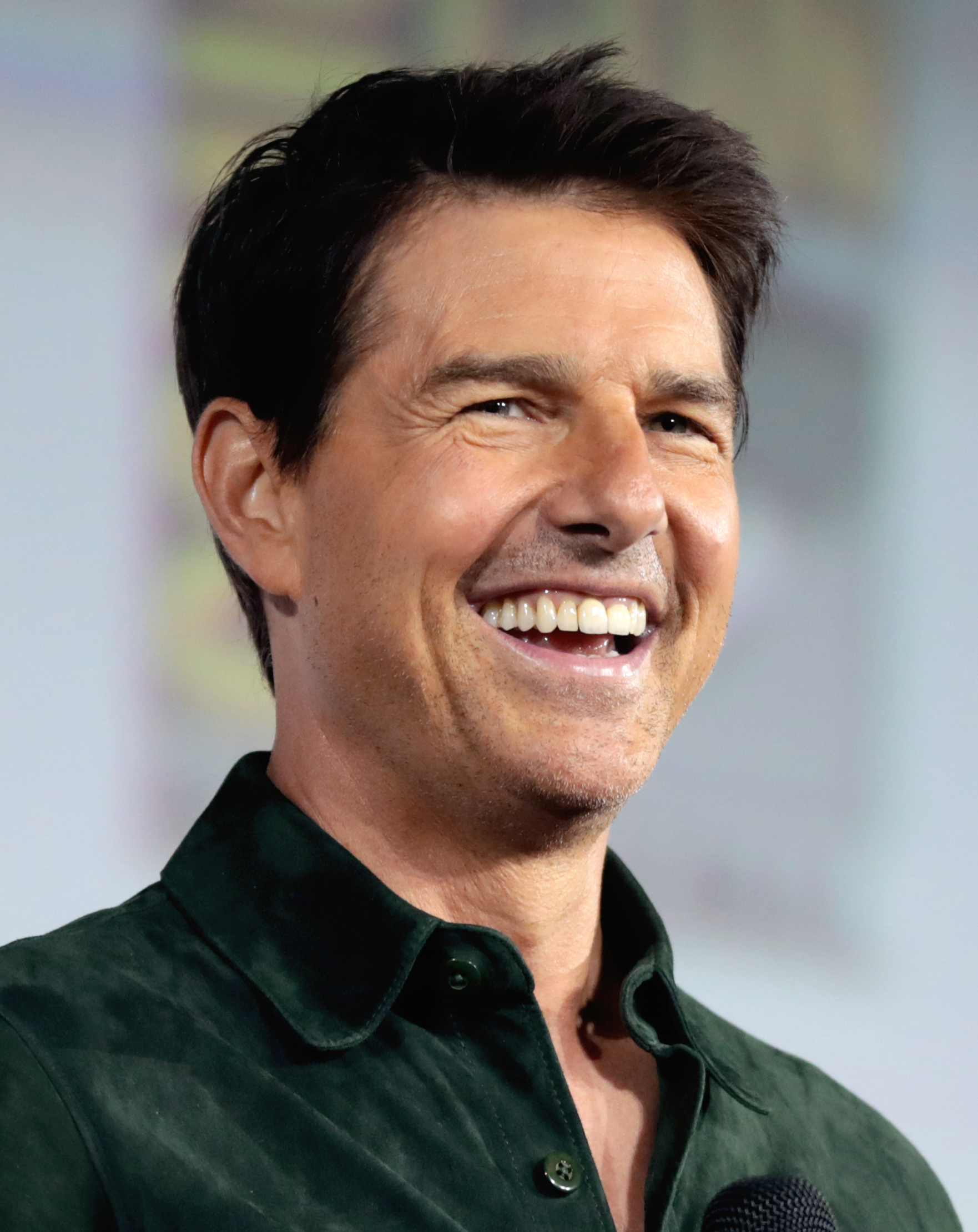
Tom Cruise — Best Actor in a Motion Picture, Drama winner

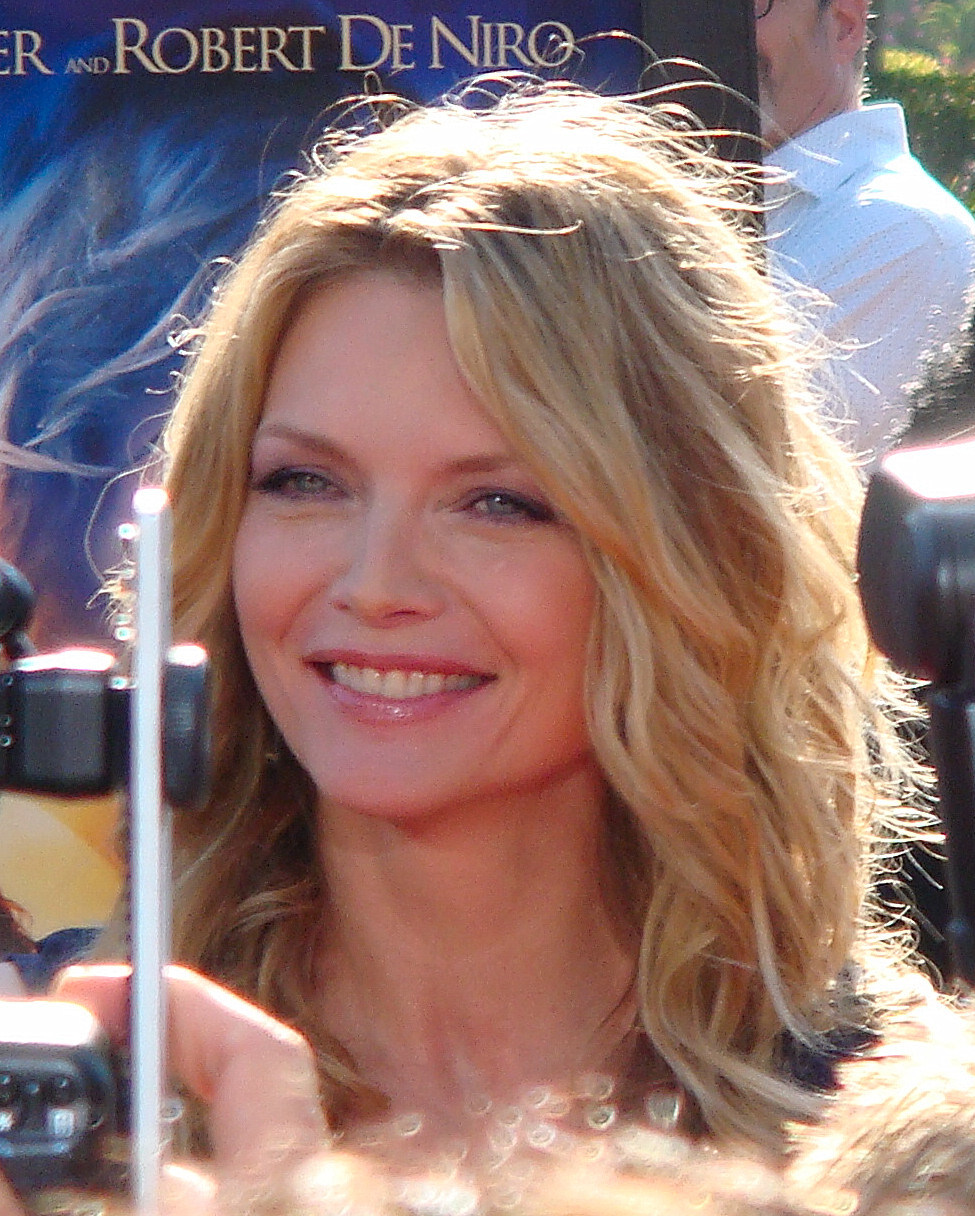
Michelle Pfeiffer — Best Actress in a Motion Picture, Drama winner

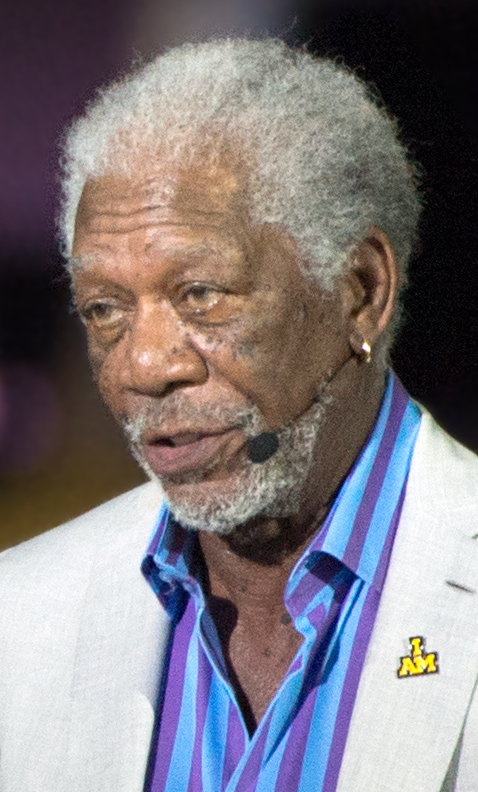
Morgan Freeman — Best Actor in a Motion Picture, Musical or Comedy winner

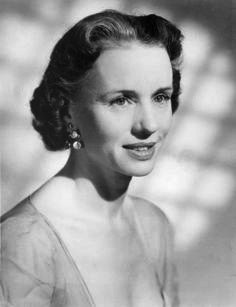
Jessica Tandy — Best Actress in a Motion Picture, Musical or Comedy winner

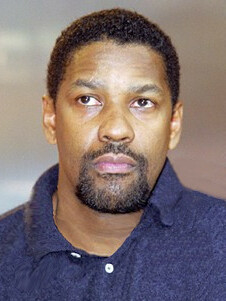
Denzel Washington — Best Supporting Actor in a Motion Picture Drama, Musical or Comedy winner

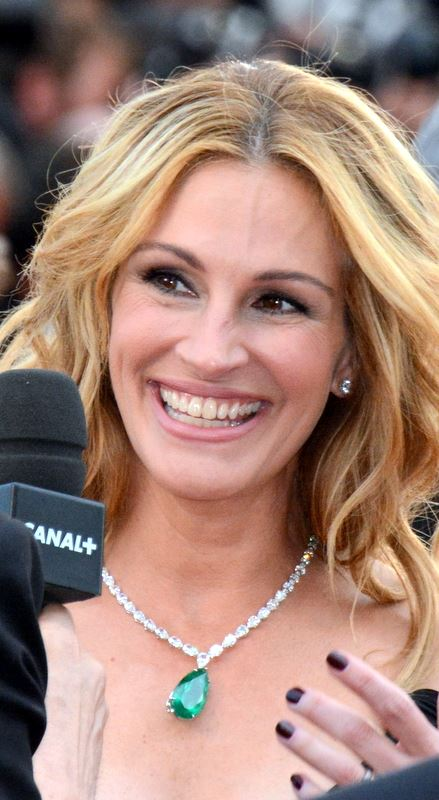
Julia Roberts — Best Supporting Actress in a Motion Picture Drama, Musical or Comedy winner

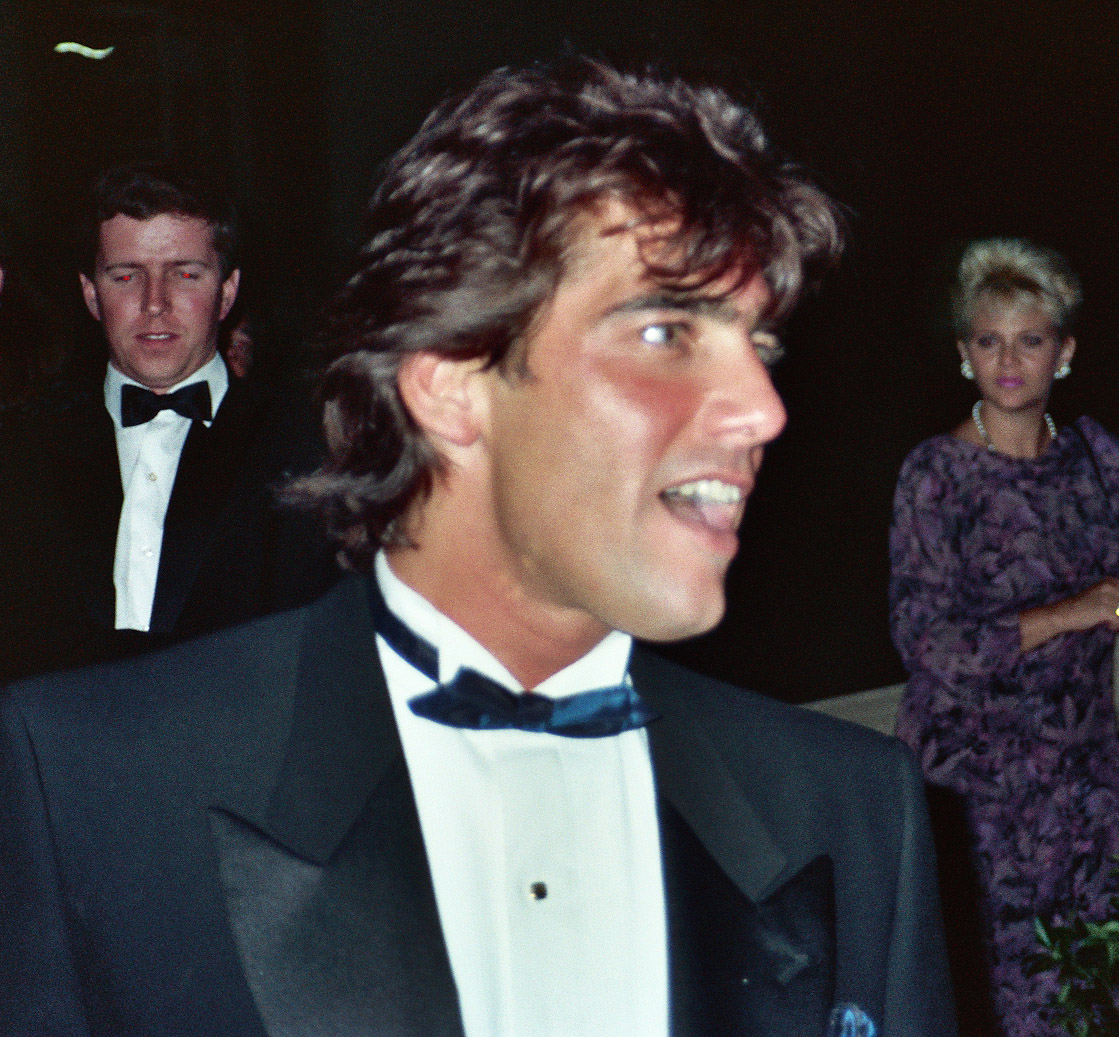
Ken Wahl — Best Actor in a Television Series, Drama winner

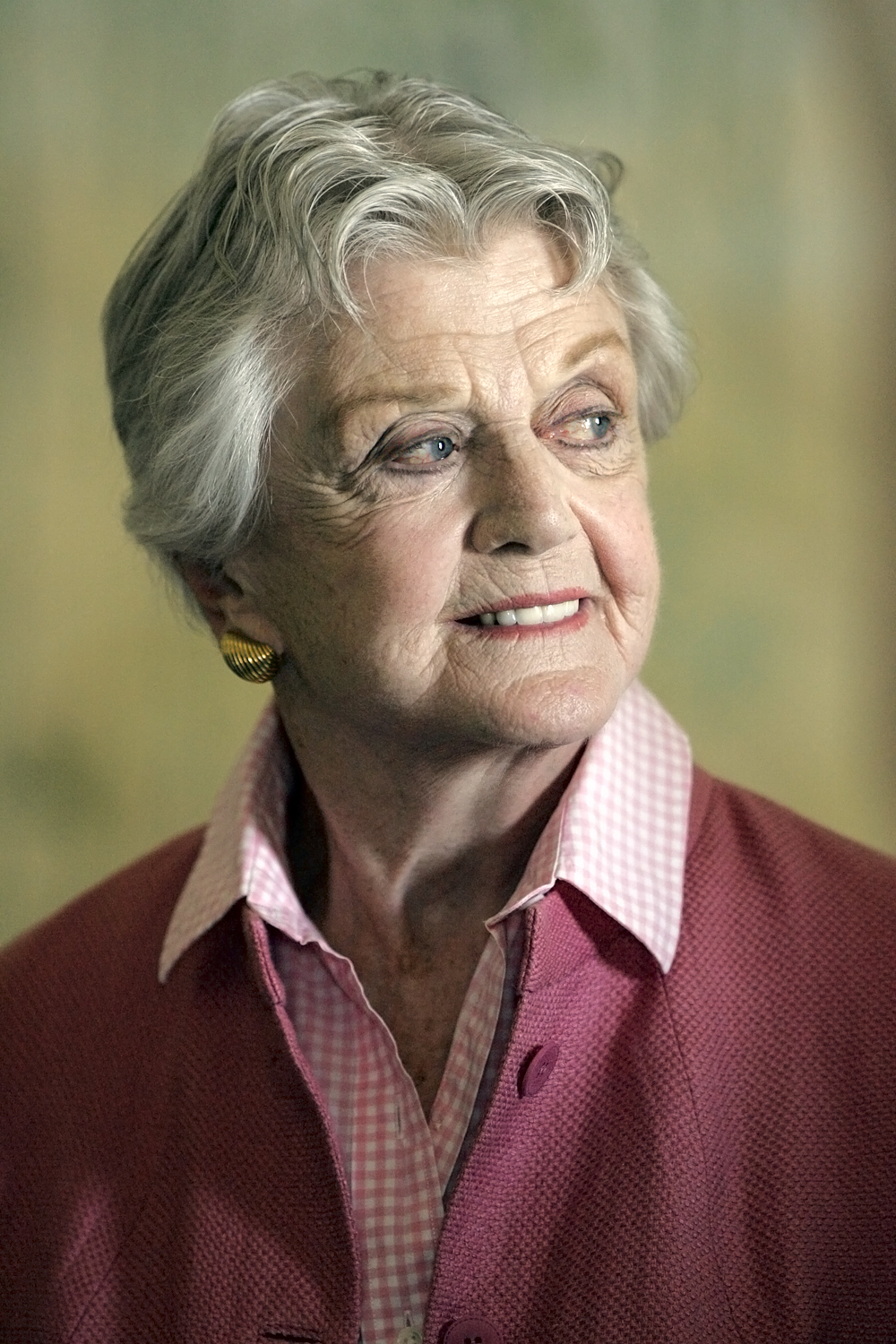
Angela Lansbury — Best Actress in a Television Series, Drama winner

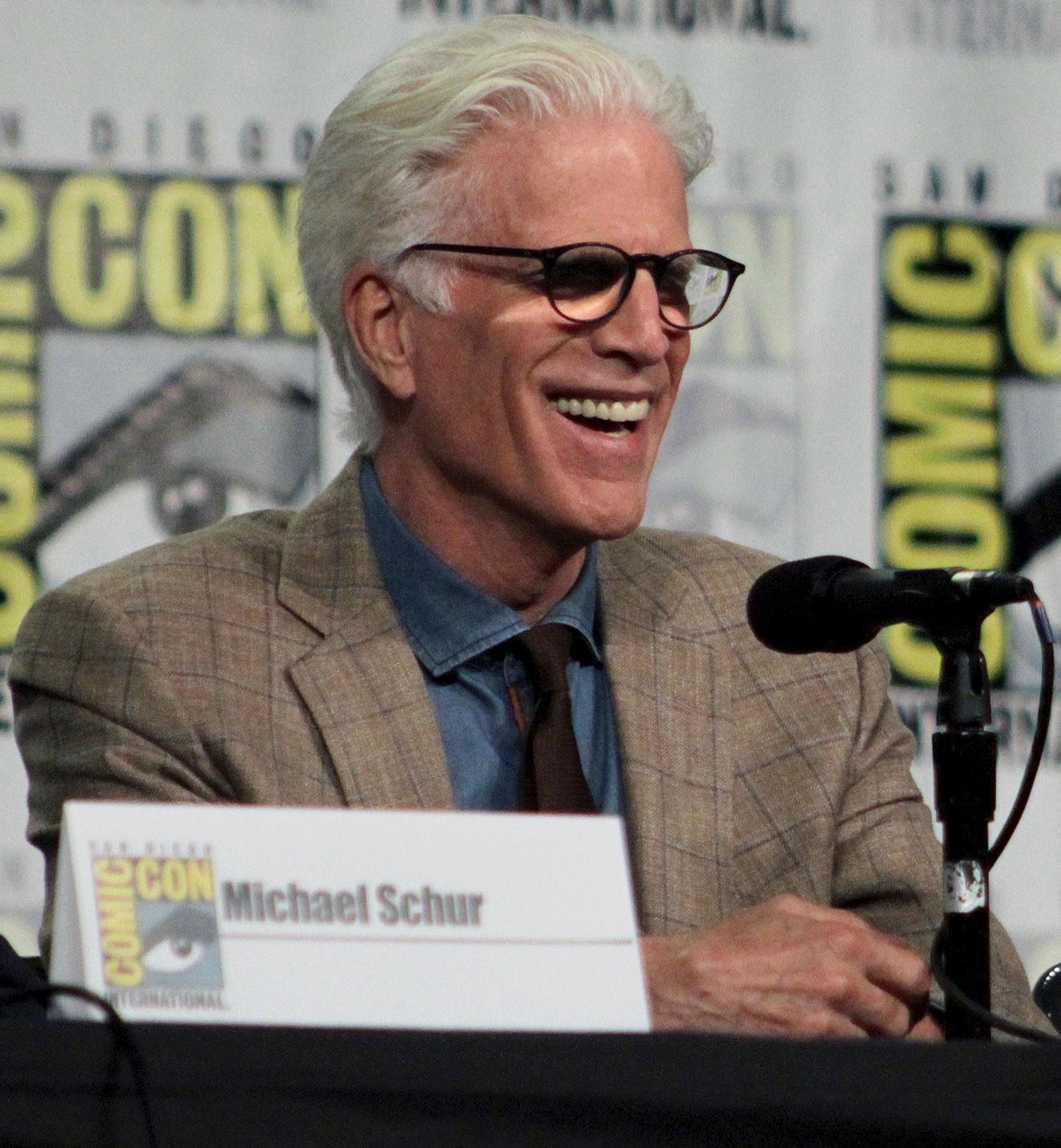
Ted Danson — Best Actor in a Television Series, Comedy or Musical winner

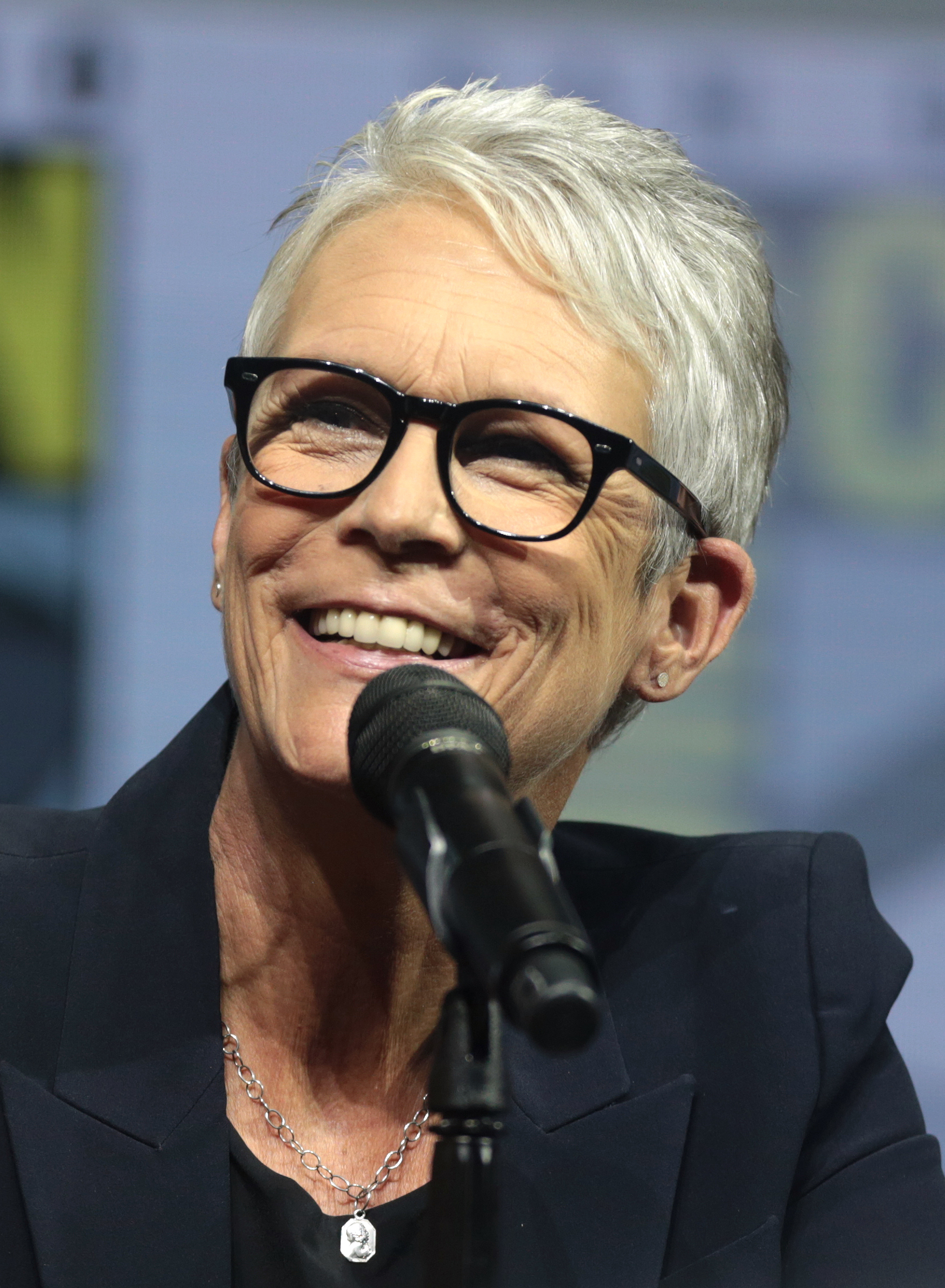
Jamie Lee Curtis — Best Actress in a Television Series, Comedy or Musical winner

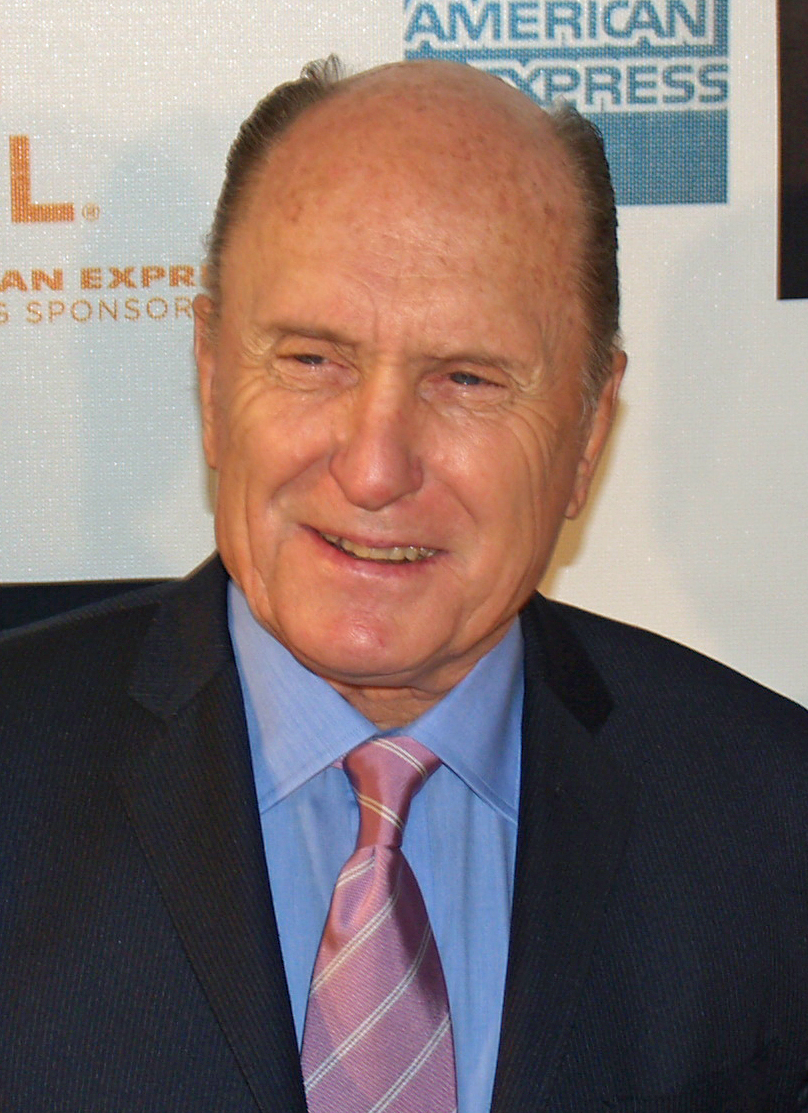
Robert Duvall — Best Actor in a Miniseries or Television Film, winner

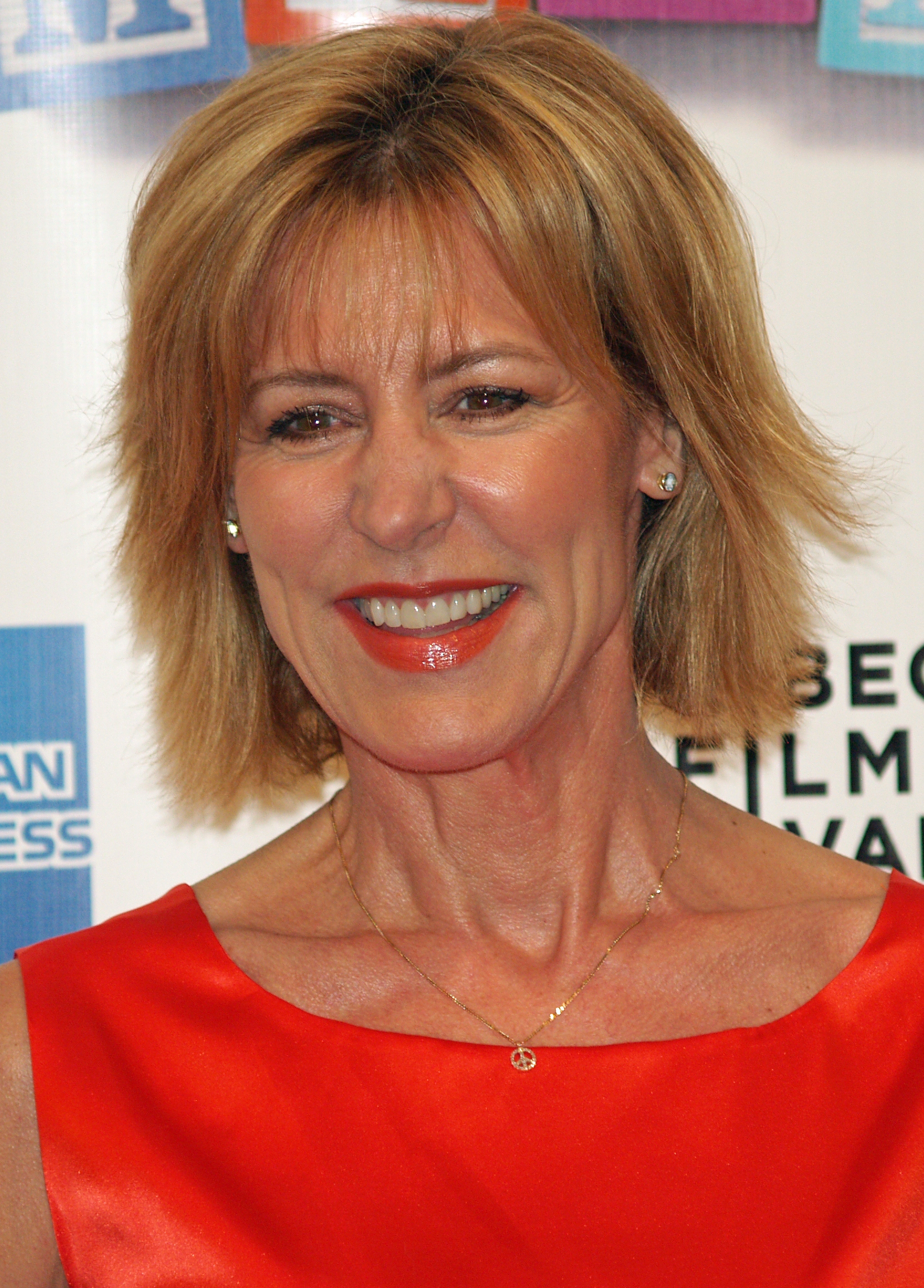
Christine Lahti — Best Actress in a Miniseries or Television Film, winner

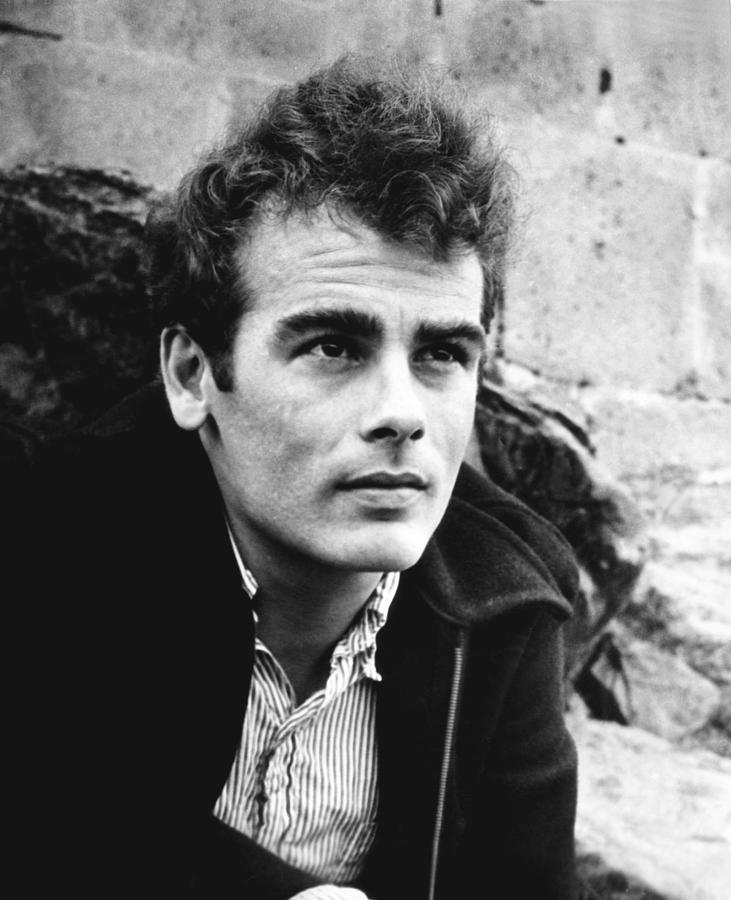
Dean Stockwell — Best Supporting Actor in a Series, Miniseries or Motion Picture Made for Television winner

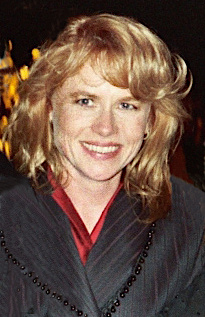
Amy Madigan — Best Supporting Actress in a Series, Miniseries or Motion Picture Made for Television winner

=== Film ===
Best Motion Picture
Drama	Comedy or Musical
Born on the Fourth of July; Crimes and Misdemeanors; Dead Poets Society; Do the Right Thing; Glory	Driving Miss Daisy; The Little Mermaid; Shirley Valentine; The War of the Roses; When Harry Met Sally...
Best Performance in a Motion Picture – Drama
Actor	Actress
Tom Cruise - Born on the Fourth of July as Ron Kovic; Daniel Day-Lewis - My Left Foot as Christy Brown; Jack Lemmon - Dad as Jake Tremont; Al Pacino - Sea of Love as Detective Frank Keller; Robin Williams - Dead Poets Society as John Keating	Michelle Pfeiffer - The Fabulous Baker Boys as Susie Diamond; Sally Field - Steel Magnolias as M'Lynn Eatenton; Jessica Lange - Music Box as Ann Talbot; Andie MacDowell - Sex, Lies, and Videotape as Ann Bishop Mullany; Liv Ullmann - The Rose Garden as Gabriele
Best Performance in a Motion Picture – Comedy or Musical
Actor	Actress
Morgan Freeman - Driving Miss Daisy as Hoke Colburn; Billy Crystal - When Harry Met Sally... as Harry Burns; Michael Douglas - The War of the Roses as Oliver Rose; Steve Martin - Parenthood as Gil Buckman; Jack Nicholson - Batman as Jack Napier / The Joker	Jessica Tandy - Driving Miss Daisy as Daisy Werthan; Pauline Collins - Shirley Valentine as Shirley Valentine-Bradshaw; Meg Ryan - When Harry Met Sally... as Sally Albright; Meryl Streep - She-Devil as Mary Fisher; Kathleen Turner - The War of the Roses as Barbara Rose
Best Supporting Performance in a Motion Picture – Drama, Comedy or Musical
Supporting Actor	Supporting Actress
Denzel Washington - Glory as Private Silas Tripp; Danny Aiello - Do the Right Thing as Sal Frangione; Marlon Brando - A Dry White Season as Ian Mackenzie; Sean Connery - Indiana Jones and the Last Crusade as Henry Jones, Sr.; Ed Harris - Jacknife as Dave; Bruce Willis - In Country as Emmett Smith	Julia Roberts - Steel Magnolias as Shelby Eatenton Latcherie; Bridget Fonda - Scandal as Mandy Rice-Davies; Brenda Fricker - My Left Foot as Bridget Fagan Brown; Laura San Giacomo - Sex, Lies, and Videotape as Cynthia Patrice Bishop; Dianne Wiest - Parenthood as Helen Buckman
Best Director	Best Screenplay
Oliver Stone - Born on the Fourth of July; Spike Lee - Do the Right Thing; Rob Reiner - When Harry Met Sally...; Peter Weir - Dead Poets Society; Edward Zwick - Glory	Ron Kovic and Oliver Stone - Born on the Fourth of July; Tom Schulman - Dead Poets Society; Spike Lee - Do the Right Thing; Kevin Jarre - Glory; Steven Soderbergh - Sex, Lies, and Videotape; Nora Ephron - When Harry Met Sally...
Best Music, Original Score	Best Original Song
Alan Menken - The Little Mermaid; John Williams - Born on the Fourth of July; Ennio Morricone - Casualties of War; Dave Grusin - The Fabulous Baker Boys; James Horner - Glory	"Under the Sea" (Alan Menken and Howard Ashman) - The Little Mermaid; "After All" (Tom Snow and Dean Pitchford) - Chances Are; "Kiss the Girl" (Alan Menken and Howard Ashman) - The Little Mermaid; "I Love to See You Smile" (Randy Newman) - Parenthood; "The Girl Who Used to Be Me" (Marvin Hamlisch, Alan Bergman, and Marilyn Bergman) - Shirley Valentine
Best Foreign Language Film
Cinema Paradiso (Nuovo cinema Paradiso) (Italy); Camille Claudel (France); Jesus of Montreal (Jésus de Montréal) (Canada); Story of Women (Une affaire de femmes) (France); My Uncle's Legacy (Zivot sa stricem) (Yugoslavia)

The following films received multiple nominations:

Nominations	Title
5	Born on the Fourth of July
5	Glory
5	When Harry Met Sally...
4	Dead Poets Society
4	Do the Right Thing
4	The Little Mermaid
3	Driving Miss Daisy
3	Parenthood
3	Sex, Lies, and Videotape
3	Shirley Valentine
3	The War of the Roses
2	The Fabulous Baker Boys
2	My Left Foot
2	Steel Magnolias

The following films received multiple wins:

Wins	Title
4	Born on the Fourth of July
3	Driving Miss Daisy
2	The Little Mermaid

=== Television ===
Best Series
Drama	Comedy or Musical
China Beach; In the Heat of the Night; L.A. Law; Murder, She Wrote; thirtysomething; Wiseguy	Murphy Brown; Cheers; Designing Women; Empty Nest; The Golden Girls; The Wonder Years
Best Miniseries or Television Film	
Lonesome Dove; I Know My First Name is Steven; My Name is Bill W.; Roe vs. Wade; Small Sacrifices	
Best Performance in a Television Series – Drama
Actor	Actress
Ken Wahl - Wiseguy as Vinnie Terranova; Corbin Bernsen - L.A. Law as Arnie Becker; Harry Hamlin - L.A. Law as Michael Kuzak; Carroll O'Connor - In the Heat of the Night as William O. "Bill" Gillespie; Ken Olin - thirtysomething as Michael Steadman	Angela Lansbury - Murder, She Wrote as Jessica Fletcher; Dana Delany - China Beach as First Lieutenant Colleen McMurphy; Susan Dey - L.A. Law as Grace Van Owen; Jill Eikenberry - L.A. Law as Ann Kelsey; Mel Harris - thirtysomething as Hope Murdoch
Best Performance in a Television Series – Comedy or Musical
Actor	Actress
Ted Danson - Cheers as Sam Malone; John Goodman - Roseanne as Dan Conner; Judd Hirsch - Dear John as John Lacey; Richard Mulligan - Empty Nest as Dr. Harry Weston; Fred Savage - The Wonder Years as Kevin Arnold	Jamie Lee Curtis - Anything but Love as Hannah Miller; Kirstie Alley - Cheers as Rebecca Howe; Stephanie Beacham - Sister Kate as Sister Katherine "Kate" Lambert; Candice Bergen - Murphy Brown as Murphy Brown; Tracey Ullman - The Tracey Ullman Show as various characters
Best Performance in a Miniseries or Television Film
Actor	Actress
Robert Duvall - Lonesome Dove as Captain Augustus "Gus" McCrae; John Gielgud - War and Remembrance as Aaron Jastrow; Ben Kingsley - Murderers Among Us: The Simon Wiesenthal Story as Simon Wiesenthal; Lane Smith - The Final Days as Richard Nixon; James Woods - My Name is Bill W. as William Griffith "Bill W." Wilson	Christine Lahti - No Place Like Home as Zan Cooper; Farrah Fawcett - Small Sacrifices as Diane Downs; Holly Hunter - Roe vs. Wade as Ellen Russell; Jane Seymour - War and Remembrance as Natalie Henry; Loretta Young - Lady in the Corner as Grace Guthrie
Best Supporting Performance in a Series, Miniseries, or Television Film
Supporting Actor	Supporting Actress
Dean Stockwell - Quantum Leap as Al Calavicci; Chris Burke - Life Goes On as Corky Thatcher; Larry Drake - L.A. Law as Benny Stulwicz; Tommy Lee Jones - Lonesome Dove as Captain Woodrow F. Call; Michael Tucker - L.A. Law as Stuart Markowitz	Amy Madigan - Roe vs. Wade as Sarah Weddington; Anjelica Huston - Lonesome Dove as Clara Allen; Rhea Perlman - Cheers as Carla Tortelli; Susan Ruttan - L.A. Law as Roxanne Melman; Julie Sommars - Matlock as Julie March

The following programs received multiple nominations

Nominations	Title
8	L.A. Law
4	Cheers
4	Lonesome Dove
3	Roe vs. Wade
3	thirtysomething
2	China Beach
2	Empty Nest
2	In the Heat of the Night
2	Murder, She Wrote
2	Small Sacrifices
2	War and Remembrance
2	Wiseguy
2	My Name Is Bill W.
2	The Wonder Years

The following programs received multiple wins:

Wins	Title
2	Lonesome Dove

== Ceremony ==
=== Presenters ===
- Kristian Alfonso
- Debbie Allen
- Don Ameche
- Scott Bakula
- Gary Busey
- Joan Collins
- Richard Crenna
- Faye Dunaway
- Peter Falk
- Sara Gilbert
- Linda Gray
- Richard Grieco
- Michael Gross
- Neil Patrick Harris
- David Hasselhoff
- Katherine Helmond
- Isabelle Huppert
- Ann Jillian
- James Earl Jones
- Christine Lahti
- Dorothy Lamour
- Martin Landau
- Patti LuPone
- Kristy McNichol
- Pat Morita
- Craig T. Nelson
- Kim Novak
- Edward James Olmos
- Gregory Peck
- George Peppard
- Emma Samms
- Tom Selleck
- Jane Seymour
- Ray Sharkey
- Tom Skerritt
- Suzanne Somers
- Joan Van Ark
- JoBeth Williams
- James Woods

=== Cecil B. DeMille Award ===
Audrey Hepburn

== See also ==
- 62nd Academy Awards
- 10th Golden Raspberry Awards
- 41st Primetime Emmy Awards
- 42nd Primetime Emmy Awards
- 43rd British Academy Film Awards
- 44th Tony Awards
- 1989 in film
- 1989 in American television
