= 1989 New York Film Critics Circle Awards =

55th New York Film Critics Circle Awards

55th New York Film Critics Circle Awards

January 14, 1990

Best Film:
My Left Foot

The 55th New York Film Critics Circle Awards honored the best filmmaking of 1989. The winners were announced on 18 December 1989 and the awards were given on 14 January 1990.

== Winners ==
- Best Actor:
  - Daniel Day-Lewis - My Left Foot
  - Runners-up: Tom Cruise - Born on the Fourth of July and Morgan Freeman - Driving Miss Daisy
- Best Actress:
  - Michelle Pfeiffer - The Fabulous Baker Boys
  - Runners-up: Jessica Tandy - Driving Miss Daisy and Andie MacDowell - Sex, Lies, and Videotape
- Best Cinematography:
  - Ernest R. Dickerson - Do the Right Thing
  - Runners-up: Michael Ballhaus - The Fabulous Baker Boys and Jeff Preiss - Let's Get Lost
- Best Director:
  - Paul Mazursky - Enemies, a Love Story
  - Runners-up: Brian De Palma - Casualties of War and Bruce Beresford - Driving Miss Daisy
- Best Documentary:
  - Roger & Me
  - Thelonious Monk: Straight, No Chaser and Let's Get Lost
- Best Film:
  - My Left Foot
  - Runners-up: Enemies, a Love Story and The Fabulous Baker Boys
- Best Foreign Language Film:
  - Story of Women (Une affaire de femmes) • France
  - Runners-up: Chocolat • France and Camille Claudel • France
- Best New Director:
  - Kenneth Branagh - Henry V
  - Runners-up: Steve Kloves - The Fabulous Baker Boys and Jim Sheridan - My Left Foot
- Best Screenplay:
  - Gus Van Sant and Daniel Yost - Drugstore Cowboy
  - Runners-up: Steven Soderbergh - Sex, Lies, and Videotape and Steve Kloves - The Fabulous Baker Boys
- Best Supporting Actor:
  - Alan Alda - Crimes and Misdemeanors
  - Runners-up: Denzel Washington - Glory and Marlon Brando - A Dry White Season
- Best Supporting Actress:
  - Lena Olin - Enemies, a Love Story
  - Runners-up: Brenda Fricker - My Left Foot and Laura San Giacomo - Sex, Lies, and Videotape
