= National Board of Review Awards 1989 =

Annual US film awards ceremony

61st National Board of Review Awards

Best Picture:
Driving Miss Daisy

The 61st National Board of Review Awards, honoring the best in filmmaking in 1989, were announced on 13 December 1989 and given on 26 February 1990.

== Top 10 films ==
1. Driving Miss Daisy
2. Henry V
3. Sex, Lies, and Videotape
4. The Fabulous Baker Boys
5. My Left Foot
6. Dead Poets Society
7. Crimes and Misdemeanors
8. Born on the Fourth of July
9. Glory
10. Field of Dreams

== Top Foreign Films ==
1. Story of Women
2. Camille Claudel
3. La Lectrice
4. Chocolat
5. The Little Thief

== Winners ==
- Best Picture:
  - Driving Miss Daisy
- Best Foreign Film:
  - Story of Women
- Best Actor:
  - Morgan Freeman - Driving Miss Daisy
- Best Actress:
  - Michelle Pfeiffer - The Fabulous Baker Boys
- Best Supporting Actor:
  - Alan Alda - Crimes and Misdemeanors
- Best Supporting Actress:
  - Mary Stuart Masterson - Immediate Family
- Best Director:
  - Kenneth Branagh - Henry V
- Best Documentary:
  - Roger & Me
- Career Achievement Award:
  - Richard Widmark
- Special Citations:
  - Robert Giroux, for six decades of distinguished efforts on behalf of film
  - Robert A. Harris, for the restoration of Lawrence of Arabia
  - Critics Andrew Sarris and Molly Haskell
