= 1989 Los Angeles Film Critics Association Awards =

Annual US film awards ceremony

15th LAFCA Awards
- Date: December 16, 1989

Highlights
- Best Picture: Do the Right Thing

The 15th Los Angeles Film Critics Association Awards were announced on 16 December 1989 and given on 16 January 1990.

== Winners ==
- Best Picture:
  - Do the Right Thing
  - Runner-up: Drugstore Cowboy
- Best Director:
  - Spike Lee - Do the Right Thing
  - Runner-up: Oliver Stone – Born on the Fourth of July
- Best Actor:
  - Daniel Day-Lewis – My Left Foot
  - Runner-up: Morgan Freeman – Lean on Me, Johnny Handsome, Glory and Driving Miss Daisy
- Best Actress (tie):
  - Andie MacDowell – Sex, Lies, and Videotape
  - Michelle Pfeiffer – The Fabulous Baker Boys
- Best Supporting Actor:
  - Danny Aiello – Do the Right Thing
  - Runner-up: Martin Landau – Crimes and Misdemeanors
- Best Supporting Actress:
  - Brenda Fricker – My Left Foot
  - Runner-up: Anjelica Huston – Enemies, a Love Story
- Best Screenplay:
  - Gus Van Sant and Daniel Yost – Drugstore Cowboy
  - Runner-up: Spike Lee - Do the Right Thing
- Best Cinematography:
  - Michael Ballhaus – The Fabulous Baker Boys
  - Runner-up: Robert Richardson – Born on the Fourth of July
- Best Music Score:
  - Bill Lee – Do the Right Thing
  - Runner-up: Elliot Goldenthal – Drugstore Cowboy
- Best Foreign Film (tie):
  - Distant Voices, Still Lives • UK
  - Story of Women (Une affaire de femmes) • France
- Best Non-Fiction Film:
  - Roger & Me
  - Runner-up: The Emperor's Naked Army Marches On (Yuki Yukite shingun)
- Best Animation:
  - The Little Mermaid
- Experimental/Independent Film/Video Award:
  - Gregg Araki – The Long Weekend (O' Despair)
- New Generation Award:
  - Laura San Giacomo – Sex, Lies, and Videotape
- Career Achievement Award:
  - Stanley Donen
- Special Citation:
  - The Margaret Herrick Library of the Academy of Motion Picture Arts and Sciences
