= List of awards and nominations received by Just Shoot Me! =

List of awards won by Just Shoot Me!
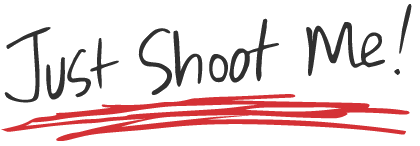
Awards and nominations
Award	Won	Nominated
American Comedy Awards	0	1
American Cinema Editors Award	0	1
BMI Film & TV Awards	4	4
Casting Society of America	0	1
Directors Guild of America Award	0	1
Emmy Awards	0	6
Golden Globe Awards	0	7
Satellite Award	0	4
Teen Choice Award	0	1
TV Land Award	0	1
- Total number of wins and nominations
Totals	4	27
- References

Just Shoot Me! is an American television sitcom created by Steven Levitan for NBC. The series takes place at the fictional Blush magazine headquarters and follows the staff, which includes the magazine's owner and publisher Jack Gallo (George Segal), writer and editor Maya Gallo (Laura San Giacomo), fashion editor and former supermodel Nina Van Horn (Wendie Malick); Elliot DiMauro Enrico Colantoni, the photographer; and Dennis Finch (David Spade), Jack's assistant. The series ran from March 4, 1997 to August 16, 2003, broadcasting 145 episodes during its seven-season initial run, including three episodes aired on syndication. During the series run, the series received 27 award nominations, including 6 Emmy Awards, 7 Golden Globe Awards, and 4 Satellite Awards.

== Awards and nominations ==
=== BMI Film & TV Awards ===
Year	Category	Nominee(s)	Result	Ref
1998	BMI TV Music Award	Steve Hampton	Won	
1999	BMI TV Music Award	Steve Hampton and Korban Kraus	Won	
2001	BMI TV Music Award	Steve Hampton and Korban Kraus	Won	
2002	BMI TV Music Award	Steve Hampton and Korban Kraus	Won	

=== Golden Globe Awards ===
Year	Category	Nominee(s)	Result	Ref
1999	Best Television Series – Musical or Comedy		Nominated	
1999	Best Actress – Television Series Musical or Comedy	Laura San Giacomo as Maya Gallo	Nominated	
1999	Best Actor – Television Series Musical or Comedy	George Segal as Jack Gallo	Nominated	
1999	Best Supporting Actor – Series, Miniseries or Television Film	David Spade as Dennis Finch	Nominated	
1999	Best Supporting Actress – Series, Miniseries or Television Film	Wendie Malick as Nina van Horn	Nominated	
2000	Best Actor – Musical or Comedy Series	George Segal as Jack Gallo	Nominated	
2000	Best Supporting Actor – Series, Miniseries or Television Film	David Spade as Dennis Finch	Nominated	

=== Primetime Emmy Awards ===
Year	Category	Nominee(s)	Result	Ref
1999	Outstanding Supporting Actor in a Comedy Series	David Spade for "Two Girls for Every Boy" and "Slow Donnie"	Nominated	
1999	Outstanding Supporting Actress in a Comedy Series	Wendie Malick for "Two Girls for Every Boy" and "Slow Donnie"	Nominated	
1999	Outstanding Writing for a Comedy Series	Steven Levitan for "Slow Donnie"	Nominated	
1999	Outstanding Multi-Camera Picture Editing for a Series	Paul Anderson	Nominated	
2000	Outstanding Guest Actress in a Comedy Series	Cheri Oteri for "First Date"	Nominated	
2002	Outstanding Supporting Actress in a Comedy Series	Wendie Malick for "Nina Van Grandma" and "The Boys in the Band"	Nominated	

=== Satellite Awards ===
Year	Category	Nominee(s)	Result	Ref
2001	Best Television Series – Musical or Comedy		Nominated	
2001	Best Actress – Television Series Musical or Comedy	Laura San Giacomo as Maya Gallo	Nominated	
2001	Best Actress – Television Series Musical or Comedy	Wendie Malick as Nina van Horn	Nominated	
2002	Best Actor – Television Series Musical or Comedy	George Segal as Jack Gallo	Nominated	

=== Other awards ===
Award	Date of ceremony	Category	Nominee(s)	Result	Ref
American Comedy Awards	1999	Funniest Supporting Male Performer in a TV Series	David Spade as Dennis Finch	Nominated	
American Cinema Editors Awards	March 14, 1998	Best Edited Half-Hour Series for Television	Dennis C. Vejar for "Lemon Wacky Hello"	Nominated	
Artios Awards	November 12, 1997	Best Casting for TV - Comedy Pilot	Deborah Barylski	Nominated	
Directors Guild of America Awards	March 6, 1999	Outstanding Directing – Comedy Series	Pamela Fryman for "Two Girls for Every Boy"	Nominated	
Teen Choice Awards	August 6, 2000	Choice Comedy Series	Just Shoot Me	Nominated	
TV Land Award	June 8, 2008	Co-Worker You're Least Likely to Invite Out for Happy Hour	David Spade	Nominated	
