= 1989 National Society of Film Critics Awards =

Annual US film awards ceremony

24th NSFC Awards

January 8, 1990

Best Film:
Drugstore Cowboy

The 24th National Society of Film Critics Awards, given on 8 January 1990, honored the best filmmaking of 1989.

== Winners ==
=== Best Picture ===
1. Drugstore Cowboy
2. Enemies, a Love Story
3. Casualties of War

=== Best Director ===
1. Gus Van Sant – Drugstore Cowboy
2. Paul Mazursky – Enemies, a Love Story
3. Spike Lee – Do the Right Thing

=== Best Actor ===
1. Daniel Day-Lewis – My Left Foot
2. Morgan Freeman – Driving Miss Daisy
3. Tom Cruise – Born on the Fourth of July

=== Best Actress ===
1. Michelle Pfeiffer – The Fabulous Baker Boys
2. Jessica Tandy – Driving Miss Daisy
3. Andie MacDowell – Sex, Lies, and Videotape

=== Best Supporting Actor ===
1. Beau Bridges – The Fabulous Baker Boys
2. Denzel Washington – Glory

=== Best Supporting Actress ===
1. Anjelica Huston – Enemies, a Love Story
2. Lena Olin – Enemies, a Love Story
3. Brenda Fricker – My Left Foot

=== Best Screenplay ===
1. Gus Van Sant and Daniel Yost – Drugstore Cowboy
2. Steven Soderbergh – Sex, Lies, and Videotape
3. Steve Kloves – The Fabulous Baker Boys

=== Best Cinematography ===
- Michael Ballhaus – The Fabulous Baker Boys

=== Best Documentary ===
- Roger & Me
