= Manlio Rocchetti =

Italian make-up artist

- Born: 28 November 1943; Rome, Italy
- Died: 9 January 2017 (aged 73); Tequesta, Florida, United States
- Other name: M. Rocchetti
- Occupation: makeup artist
- Years active: 1960-2017
- Children: Alessandra Rocchetti and Paola Rocchetti

Manlio Rocchetti (28 November 1943 – 9 January 2017) was an Italian makeup artist who won an Academy Award at the 1989 Academy Awards for Best Makeup for the film Driving Miss Daisy, which he shared with Lynn Barber and Kevin Haney.

His career started in 1960 and continually worked on makeup until 2012. He often worked with Martin Scorsese.

He also won an Emmy for the makeup in Lonesome Dove.
