= Elizabeth McBride =

American costume designer

- Born: May 17, 1955; Shreveport, Louisiana
- Died: June 16, 1997 (aged 42); Santa Fe, New Mexico, US
- Occupation: Costume designer
- Years active: 1982–1996

Elizabeth McBride (May 17, 1955 – June 16, 1997) was an American costume designer. She was nominated for Best Costumes for the film Driving Miss Daisy at the 62nd Academy Awards.

She died at age 42 of cancer.

== Selected filmography ==
- Michael (1996)
- Assassin's (1995)
- The Shawshank Redemption (1994)
- China Moon (1994)
- Flesh and Bone (1993)
- Made In America (1993)
- Fried Green Tomatoes (1991)
- Thelma & Louise (1991)
- Sudie and Simpson (1990)
- Love Hurts (1990)
- Driving Miss Daisy (1989)
- Unholy Matrimony (1988)
- The Appointments of Dennis Jennings (1988)
- Tapeheads (1988)
- Foxfire (1987)
- Square Dance (1987)
- True Stories (1986)
- He's Not Your Son (1984)
- Time Bomb (1984)
- License to Kill (1984)
- Tender Mercies (1983)
