= Story of Women =

1988 French drama film

- Theatrical release poster
- French: Une affaire de femmes
- Directed by: Claude Chabrol
- Screenplay by: Colo Tavernier O'Hagan; Claude Chabrol
- Based on: Une affaire de femmes by Francis Szpiner
- Produced by: Marin Karmitz
- Starring: Isabelle Huppert; François Cluzet; Nils Tavernier; Marie Trintignant
- Cinematography: Jean Rabier
- Edited by: Monique Fardoulis
- Music by: Matthieu Chabrol
- Production companies: MK2 Productions; Films A2; Les Films du Camélia; La Sept; Sofinergie Films
- Distributed by: MK2 Diffusion
- Release dates: 2 September 1988 (Venice); 21 September 1988 (France)
- Running time: 108 minutes
- Country: France
- Language: French

Story of Women (French: Une affaire de femmes) is a 1988 French drama film directed by Claude Chabrol, based on the true story of Marie-Louise Giraud, guillotined on 30 July 1943 for having performed 27 abortions in the Cherbourg area, and the 1986 book Une affaire de femmes by Francis Szpiner.

The film premiered at the 45th Venice International Film Festival, in which Isabelle Huppert was awarded the prize for Best Actress. It has been cited as a favorite by filmmaker John Waters, who presented it as his annual selection within the 2008 Maryland Film Festival.

== Plot ==
Under the German military administration in occupied France during World War II, Paul Latour is a prisoner of war in Germany and his wife Marie lives hand-to-mouth with their two children in a squalid flat. A neighbour, whose husband is also in Germany, has fallen pregnant and is trying to lose the baby. Marie helps her successfully. Other women come to her and she starts charging.

While talking with Paul following his release, she reveals that a fortune teller saw "nothing but good things" in her future, along with a lot of women, which she would not clarify. Marie confesses to wanting to be a famous singer. She has, however, lost her love for her husband, who has been wounded and struggles to stay in employment, and rejects his crude and abrupt sexual demands.

Although he cannot find work, he rents a bigger flat at her prompting. Marie continues her illicit business and lets prostitutes use their bedrooms during the day. When one of the abortions goes wrong, the woman dies and her despairing husband commits suicide. Marie shrugs off the tragedy and hires a maid to help. She visits a music teacher, who tells her that she has a great voice.

She also starts a daytime affair with a collaborator and offers the maid a pay raise if she sleeps with Paul. Paul is unhappy with this arrangement and, after he returns home early and witnesses Marie and her lover asleep together, he sends an anonymous denunciation to the police, alerting them to her illegal activities.

A recent law of the Vichy régime, determined to enforce morality and stop population decline, has made abortion a treasonable crime. Marie is condemned to death and guillotined.

== Cast ==
- Isabelle Huppert as Marie
- François Cluzet as Paul
- Nils Tavernier as Lucien
- Marie Trintignant as Lulu/Lucie
- Dominique Blanc as Jasmine
- Franck de la Personne as Martinet
- Guillaume Foutrier as Pierrot #1
- Nicolas Foutrier as Pierrot #2
- Aurore Gauvin as Mouche #1
- Lolita Chammah as Mouche #2
- Thomas Chabrol as the waiter
- Fabienne Chaudat as the saleswoman

== Release ==
The film had its world premiere at the Venice International Film Festival on September 2, 1988. It premiered in France on September 21, 1988. In the United States, the film premiered on October 13, 1989 in New York City. It began its theatrical run in the US in February 1990.

On October 8, 1988, during a screening of the film at a cinema in the Montparnasse neighborhood of Paris, an audience member died of a heart attack after Christian fundamentalist terrorists threw a tear gas canister into the crowd.

== Critical reception ==
In a positive review for The New York Times, Janet Maslin wrote "Isabelle Huppert has an uncanny ability to convey self-interest on the screen, a quality rendered even steelier by the utter indifference with which it is displayed." She added, "Mr. Chabrol, whose career has had its distinct ups and downs and whose work has barely been shown here in recent years, makes a triumphant return to the kind of emblematic crime story that has long attracted him, in films as different as Violette (1978) and Le Boucher (1971)."

In the Los Angeles Times Kevin Thomas wrote, "As a mature work of a master, 'Story of Women'...has a terrific sense of immediacy, an enormous vitality and a deep and broad perspective. It's as if Chabrol is reminding us that social change, inevitably slow and painful as it is, is possible even in the face of seemingly immutable human nature." He continued: "Timely--and scathing--as 'Story of Women' is regarding abortion and women's rights, it is above all a terse, tragic yet exhilarating evocation of the most painful period in modern French history." He also praised Huppert's performance, saying she "has that rare gift that Garbo had in sublime abundance: She is able to give you a complete woman, yet remain a radiant enigma in her beauty and dignity".

On the review aggregator website Rotten Tomatoes, 85% of 13 critics' reviews are positive.

== Accolades ==
Award	Category	Nominee	Result	Ref.
Bogotá Film Festival	Best Actress	Isabelle Huppert	Won	
Bogotá Film Festival	Best Screenplay	Colo Tavernier O'Hagan, Claude Chabrol	Won	
Boston Society of Film Critics Awards	Best Foreign Language Film		Won	
Cahiers du Cinéma's Annual Top 10 Lists	Best Film	Claude Chabrol	Nominated	
César Awards	Best Actress	Isabelle Huppert	Nominated	
César Awards	Best Supporting Actress	Marie Trintignant	Nominated	
César Awards	Best Director	Claude Chabrol	Nominated	
Golden Globe Awards	Best Foreign Language Film		Nominated	
Kansas City Film Critics	Best Foreign Language Film		Won	
Los Angeles Film Critics Association Awards	Best Foreign Language Film	Claude Chabrol	Won (Note: Tied with Terence Davies for Distant Voices, Still Lives)	
National Board of Review Awards	Best Foreign Film		Won	
National Board of Review Awards	Top Foreign Films		Won	
New York Film Critics Circle Awards	Best Foreign Language Film		Won	
Sant Jordi Awards	Best Foreign Actress	Isabelle Huppert	Won	
Valladolid International Film Festival	Best Actress	Isabelle Huppert	Won	
Valladolid International Film Festival	Silver Spike for Best Film	Claude Chabrol	Won	
Valladolid International Film Festival	Golden Spike for Best Film	Claude Chabrol	Nominated	
Venice International Film Festival	Volpi Cup for Best Actress	Isabelle Huppert	Won (Note: Tied with Shirley MacLaine for Madame Sousatzka)	
Venice International Film Festival	Filmcritica "Bastone Bianco" Award - Special Mention	Claude Chabrol	Won	
Venice International Film Festival	Golden Ciak for Best Film	Claude Chabrol	Won	
Venice International Film Festival	Golden Lion	Claude Chabrol	Nominated	

The film was ineligible for the Academy Award for Best Foreign Language Film as France had submitted Camille Claudel.

== See also ==
- Isabelle Huppert on screen and stage
- 1988 in film
- List of French films of 1988
