= Christy Brown =

Irish writer and painter (1932–1981)

- Born: Christopher Brown; 5 June 1932; Crumlin, Dublin, Ireland
- Died: 7 September 1981 (aged 49); Parbrook, Somerset, England
- Occupations: Novelist, painter, poet
- Writing career
- Period: 1954–1981

Christopher Brown (5 June 1932 – 7 September 1981) was an Irish writer and painter. He had cerebral palsy, and this allowed him to write or type only with the toes of one foot. His most recognized work is his autobiography, titled My Left Foot (1954). It was later made into a 1989 Academy Award-winning film of the same name, starring Daniel Day-Lewis as Brown.

== Life ==
Brown was born into a working-class Irish family at the Rotunda Hospital in Dublin in June 1932. His parents were Bridget (née Fagan; 1901–1968) and Patrick Brown (1901–1955). He had twenty-one siblings, nine of whom died in infancy. In 1924, his family had moved to 54 Stannaway Road in Kimmage, which was to be his childhood home. He was born with severe cerebral palsy, so that he was almost entirely spastic in his limbs. Though urged to commit him to a hospital, Brown's parents were determined to raise him at home. During Brown's adolescence, a social worker began to visit regularly, bringing Brown books and painting materials, as he had shown a keen interest in the arts and literature. Brown learned to write and draw with his left leg, the only limb over which he had effective control. Brown quickly matured into a serious artist. Although Brown received almost no formal schooling during his youth, he did attend St Brendan's School-Clinic in Sandymount intermittently. At St Brendan's, he came in contact with Robert Collis, an author. Collis discovered that Brown was also a natural novelist and, later, Collis helped use his own connections to publish My Left Foot, by then a long-gestating autobiographical account of Brown's struggle with everyday life amidst the vibrant culture of Dublin.

When My Left Foot became a literary sensation, one of the many people who wrote letters to Brown was married American woman Beth Moore. Brown and Moore became regular correspondents and, in 1960, Brown holidayed in North America and stayed with Moore at her home in Connecticut. When they met again in 1965, they began an affair. Brown journeyed to Connecticut once more to finish his magnum opus, which he had been developing for years. He finally did so in 1967 with help from Moore, who introduced and administered a strict working regimen, mostly by denying him alcohol (on which Brown was dependent) until a day's work was completed. The book, titled Down All the Days, was published in 1970 and was inscribed with a dedication to Moore that read, "For Beth, who with such gentle ferocity, finally whipped me into finishing this book..." During this time, Brown's fame continued to spread internationally and he became a prominent celebrity. Upon his return to Ireland, he was able to use proceeds from the sales of his books to design and move into a specially constructed home outside Dublin with his sister's family. Though Brown and Moore had planned to marry and live together at the new home, and though Moore had informed her husband of these plans, it was around this time that Brown began an affair with Englishwoman Mary Carr, whom he met at a party in London. Brown then terminated his affair with Moore and married Carr at the Register Office, Dublin, in 1972. They moved to Stoney Lane, Rathcoole, County Dublin (now site of Lisheen Nursing Home), to Ballyheigue, County Kerry and then to Somerset in England. He continued to paint and write novels, poetry and plays. His 1974 novel, A Shadow on Summer, was based on his relationship with Moore, whom he still considered a friend.

Brown's health deteriorated after marrying Carr. He became mainly a recluse in his last years, which is thought to be a direct result of Carr's influence and perhaps abusive nature. Brown died at the age of 49 after choking during dinner. His body was found to have significant bruising, which led many to believe that Carr had physically abused him. Further suspicions arose after Georgina Hambleton's biography, The Life That Inspired My Left Foot, revealed a supposedly more accurate and unhealthy version of their relationship. The book portrays Carr as an abusive alcoholic and habitually unfaithful. In Hambleton's book, she quotes Brown's brother, Sean, as saying: "Christy loved her but it wasn't reciprocated because she wasn't that kind of person. If she loved him like she said she did, she wouldn't have had affairs with both men and women. I feel she took advantage of him in more ways than one."

== Cultural legacy ==
Brown's magnum opus, Down All the Days was an ambitious project drawn largely from a playful expansion of My Left Foot; it also became an international best-seller, translated into 14 languages. The Irish Times reviewer Bernard Share claimed the work was "the most important Irish novel since Ulysses." Like James Joyce, Brown employed the stream-of-consciousness technique and sought to document Dublin's culture through the use of humour, accurate dialects and intricate character description. Down All the Days was followed by a series of other novels, including A Shadow on Summer (1972), Wild Grow the Lilies (1976) and A Promising Career (published posthumously in 1982). He also published three poetry collections: Come Softly to My Wake, Background Music and Of Snails and Skylarks. All the poems are included in The Collected Poems of Christy Brown.

A film adaptation of My Left Foot directed by Jim Sheridan was produced in 1989 from a screenplay by Shane Connaughton. Daniel Day-Lewis stars as Brown and Brenda Fricker as his mother; both won Academy Awards for their performances. The film also received Academy Award nominations for Best Picture, Best Director, and Best Adapted Screenplay.

Rock band The Pogues paid tribute to Christy Brown with a song titled "Down All the Days." It is the seventh track on their 1989 recording Peace and Love. Similarly, U2 released a song titled "Down All the Days" with the 20th anniversary edition of Achtung Baby. The Men They Couldn't Hang also wrote a song "Down All the Days" which appears on the Silver Town album also released in 1989.

A previously unrecorded self-portrait painting by Christy Brown was included in two contemporary group exhibitions in 2025 and 2026 in Ireland, curated by independent curators and artists Paul Hallahan and Lee Welch. The painting was first exhibited publicly in the exhibition All Flowers in Time Bend Towards the Sun at the Coach House Gallery, Dublin Castle in February 2025. In this exhibition, Brown's historical work was shown alongside contemporary pieces by artists including Genieve Figgis, Elizabeth Peyton, Michael Warren and Eva Rothschild. The self-portrait was subsequently shown at The Model, Sligo as part of the group exhibition Songs to the Siren in January 2026. For this iteration, the painting was displayed alongside works by international and Irish modern figures, including Joyce Pensato, Sean Scully, Mark Leckey, Emma Roche and Jack B. Yeats.
