= Driving Miss Daisy =

1989 drama film by Bruce Beresford

- Theatrical release poster by Dave Christensen
- Directed by: Bruce Beresford
- Screenplay by: Alfred Uhry
- Based on: Driving Miss Daisy; 1987 play by Alfred Uhry
- Produced by: Richard D. Zanuck; Lili Fini Zanuck
- Starring: Morgan Freeman; Jessica Tandy; Dan Aykroyd; Patti LuPone; Esther Rolle
- Cinematography: Peter James
- Edited by: Mark Warner
- Music by: Hans Zimmer
- Production company: The Zanuck Company
- Distributed by: Warner Bros. (United States, Canada, United Kingdom and Ireland); Allied Filmmakers Majestic Films International (International)
- Release date: December 15, 1989
- Running time: 99 minutes
- Country: United States
- Language: English
- Budget: $7.5 million
- Box office: $145.8 million

Driving Miss Daisy is a 1989 American comedy drama film directed by Bruce Beresford and written by Alfred Uhry, based on Uhry's 1987 play. The film stars Jessica Tandy, Morgan Freeman, and Dan Aykroyd. Freeman reprised his role from the original Off-Broadway production.

The story defines Daisy and her point of view—through a network of relationships and emotions by focusing on her home life, synagogue, friends, family, fears, and concerns—over a twenty-five-year period.

Driving Miss Daisy was a critical and commercial success upon its release and at the 62nd Academy Awards received nine nominations, and won four: Best Picture, Best Actress (for Tandy), Best Makeup, and Best Adapted Screenplay. As of 2025, it is the most recent PG-rated film to have won Best Picture.

== Plot ==
In 1948, Miss Daisy Werthan, a 72-year-old wealthy, Jewish, widowed, retired schoolteacher, lives alone in Atlanta, Georgia, except for a black housekeeper, Idella, who comes in daily. When Daisy accidentally drives her 1946 Chrysler Windsor into her neighbor's yard, her 40-year-old son, Boolie, buys her a Hudson Commodore and hires 60-year-old Hoke Colburn, a black chauffeur, as Daisy can no longer drive due to her being a high insurance risk. Boolie tells Hoke that Daisy may not appreciate his efforts, but she cannot fire him, because Boolie is his employer. At first, Daisy refuses to let anyone drive her, but Hoke's patience pays off, and she reluctantly accepts the first two trips; one to the Piggly Wiggly supermarket, the other to her synagogue. Then she tries to get Boolie to fire Hoke after she had discovered a can of salmon missing from her pantry which she believes Hoke had stolen the previous day. However, the following morning when arriving for work, and without knowing that Miss Daisy had even noticed the missing can, Hoke tells her that he has brought a replacement can because he had eaten the salmon himself the previous evening because the leftovers she had provided for his dinner were inedible.

As Daisy and Hoke spend time together, she comes to appreciate his many skills. She teaches him to read using her teaching skills and resources. Meanwhile, Hoke buys the Hudson and Cadillacs in which he drives Miss Daisy, after they are traded in for newer models, and he negotiates a higher salary with Boolie. Hoke takes Miss Daisy to a birthday party in Alabama. Hoke experiences racism when he is not allowed to use the public restroom at a gas station.

In the spring of 1963, a new television is seen in the kitchen, and Hoke and Idella watch as they go about their kitchen duties. After Hoke comes back from serving cake to the ladies over, Idella drops the peas she was shucking, her hand lying limp. After Idella dies, rather than hire a new housekeeper, Daisy decides to care for her own house and have Hoke do the cooking and the driving.

After her synagogue is bombed, Daisy realizes that she is also a victim of prejudice. American society is undergoing radical changes, and Miss Daisy attends a dinner at which Dr. Martin Luther King Jr. gives a speech. Boolie declines when she invites him to the dinner, fearing the chance of lost business, and suggests that she invite Hoke. She waits until the last moment, and even then only raises it with Hoke in the car on the way to the event, saying that Boolie had said that Hoke wanted to attend. Hoke says he had not in fact said anything to Boolie, and tells Miss Daisy that she should have just asked him directly if she had thought he might like to attend. She attends the dinner alone while Hoke listens to the speech on the car radio. She is struck by King's words, when he says: "If the moderates of the white South fail to act now, history will have to record that the greatest tragedy was not the vitriolic words and the violent actions of the bad people, but the appalling silence and indifference of the good people."

One morning in 1971, Hoke arrives at the house to find Daisy agitated and showing signs of dementia: she believes that she is a young teacher again. Hoke calms her down. In that conversation, she calls Hoke her "best friend". Boolie arranges for Daisy to enter a retirement home.

In 1973, Hoke, now 85 and rapidly losing his eyesight, retires. Boolie, now 65, drives Hoke to the retirement home to visit Daisy, now 97. The two catch up, and Hoke gently feeds her Thanksgiving pie.

== Cast ==
- Morgan Freeman as Hoke Colburn
- Jessica Tandy as Daisy Werthan
- Dan Aykroyd as Boolie Werthan
- Patti LuPone as Florine Werthan
- Esther Rolle as Idella
- Joann Havrilla as Miss McClatchey
- William Hall Jr. as Oscar
- Muriel Moore as Miriam
- Sylvia Kaler as Beulah
- Crystal R. Fox as Katey Bell

== Production ==
Eddie Murphy was the first choice for the role of Hoke Colburn but turned it down, later explaining in 2025: "They actually developed that for me... I wasn't doing no shit like that back then. I was like 'I ain't driving no Miss Daisy.'"

== Reception ==
=== Box office ===
Driving Miss Daisy was given a limited release on December 15, 1989, earning $73,745 in three theaters. The film was given a wide release on January 26, 1990, earning $5,705,721 over its opening weekend in 895 theaters, becoming the number one film in the United States. It remained at number 1 the following week but was knocked off the top spot in its third weekend of wide release by Hard to Kill. It returned to number one the next weekend and remained there for a fourth week. The film ultimately grossed $106,593,296 in North America, and $39,200,000 in other territories, for a worldwide total of $145,793,296. The film was released in the United Kingdom on February 23, 1990.

=== Critical response ===
Driving Miss Daisy was well received by critics, with particular praise for the screenplay and performances by Freeman, Tandy and Aykroyd. The review aggregator Rotten Tomatoes gives the film an 85% rating based on reviews from 106 critics, with an average score of 7.70/10. The website's critical consensus states: "While it's fueled in part by outdated stereotypes, Driving Miss Daisy takes audiences on a heartwarming journey with a pair of outstanding actors." On Metacritic, which assigns a rating out of 100 based on reviews from mainstream critics, the film has a score of 81 based on 17 reviews. CinemaScore similarly reported that audiences gave the film a rare "A+" grade.

Gene Siskel of the Chicago Tribune declared Driving Miss Daisy one of the best films of 1989. Roger Ebert of the Chicago Sun-Times called it "a film of great love and patience" and wrote, "It is an immensely subtle film, in which hardly any of the most important information is carried in the dialogue and in which body language, tone of voice or the look in an eye can be the most important thing in a scene. After so many movies in which shallow and violent people deny their humanity and ours, what a lesson to see a film that looks into the heart."

Peter Travers of Rolling Stone also gave the film a positive review, calling Tandy's performance "glorious" and opining, "This is Tandy's finest two hours onscreen in a film career that goes back to 1932." The performances of Tandy and Freeman were also praised by Vincent Canby of The New York Times, who observed, "The two actors manage to be highly theatrical without breaking out of the realistic frame of the film."

On the other hand, the film has been criticized for its handling of the issue of racism. Candice Russell of the South Florida Sun-Sentinel described Freeman's character as having a "toadying manner" which was "painful to see", and said that the film was ultimately "one scene after another of a pompous old lady issuing orders and a servant trying to comply by saying 'yassum.'" The film's nomination for Best Picture at the Academy Awards over Spike Lee's Do the Right Thing was controversial. Lee later reflected on the controversial decision by saying that Driving Miss Daisy was "not being taught in film schools all across the world like Do the Right Thing is."

== Awards and nominations ==
Driving Miss Daisy received nine Academy Award nominations and also achieved the following distinctions in Oscar history:

- It is the only film based on an off-Broadway production ever to win Best Picture.
- Jessica Tandy (at age 80) became the oldest winner in history to win Best Actress.
- It was the first Best Picture winner since Grand Hotel in 1932 to not also receive a Best Director nomination. That has occurred three times since: Argo in 2012, Green Book in 2018, and CODA in 2021. Wings, the first to win Best Picture in 1927, did not have a nomination for director William A. Wellman. In his opening monologue at the 62nd awards ceremony, host Billy Crystal made fun of this irony by calling it "the film that apparently directed itself".
- As of 2025, it is the latest Best Picture winner that was rated PG. All the winners since have been rated PG-13 or R.

Award	Category	Nominee(s)	Result	Ref.
Academy Awards	Best Picture	Richard D. Zanuck and Lili Fini Zanuck	Won	
Academy Awards	Best Actor	Morgan Freeman	Nominated	
Academy Awards	Best Actress	Jessica Tandy	Won	
Academy Awards	Best Supporting Actor	Dan Aykroyd	Nominated	
Academy Awards	Best Screenplay – Based on Material from Another Medium	Alfred Uhry	Won	
Academy Awards	Best Art Direction	Art Direction: Bruno Rubeo; Set Decoration: Crispian Sallis	Nominated	
Academy Awards	Best Costume Design	Elizabeth McBride	Nominated	
Academy Awards	Best Film Editing	Mark Warner	Nominated	
Academy Awards	Best Makeup	Manlio Rocchetti, Lynn Barber, and Kevin Haney	Won	
American Comedy Awards	Funniest Actor in a Motion Picture (Leading Role)	Morgan Freeman	Nominated	
American Comedy Awards	Funniest Actress in a Motion Picture (Leading Role)	Jessica Tandy	Nominated	
American Comedy Awards	Funniest Supporting Actor in a Motion Picture	Dan Aykroyd	Nominated	
Berlin International Film Festival	Golden Bear	Bruce Beresford	Nominated	
Berlin International Film Festival	Best Joint Performance	Jessica Tandy and Morgan Freeman	Won	
BMI Film & TV Awards	Film Music Award	Hans Zimmer	Won	
Boston Society of Film Critics Awards	Best Actress	Jessica Tandy	Won	
British Academy Film Awards	Best Film	Richard D. Zanuck, Lili Fini Zanuck, and Bruce Beresford	Nominated	
British Academy Film Awards	Best Direction	Bruce Beresford	Nominated	
British Academy Film Awards	Best Actress in a Leading Role	Jessica Tandy	Won	
British Academy Film Awards	Best Adapted Screenplay	Alfred Uhry	Nominated	
David di Donatello Awards	Best Foreign Actress	Jessica Tandy	Won	
Golden Globe Awards	Best Motion Picture – Musical or Comedy		Won	
Golden Globe Awards	Best Actor in a Motion Picture – Musical or Comedy	Morgan Freeman	Won	
Golden Globe Awards	Best Actress in a Motion Picture – Musical or Comedy	Jessica Tandy	Won	
Grammy Awards	Best Instrumental Composition Written for a Motion Picture or for Television	Driving Miss Daisy – Hans Zimmer	Nominated	
Kansas City Film Critics Circle Awards	Best Actor	Morgan Freeman	Won	
Kansas City Film Critics Circle Awards	Best Actress	Jessica Tandy	Won	
Los Angeles Film Critics Association Awards	Best Actor	Morgan Freeman	Runner-up	
NAACP Image Awards	Outstanding Actor in a Motion Picture	Morgan Freeman	Won	
Nastro d'Argento	Best Female Dubbing	Micaela Giustiniani (for dubbing Jessica Tandy)	Won	
National Board of Review Awards	Best Film		Won	
National Board of Review Awards	Top Ten Films		Won	
National Board of Review Awards	Best Actor	Morgan Freeman	Won	
National Society of Film Critics Awards	Best Actor	Morgan Freeman	2nd Place	
National Society of Film Critics Awards	Best Actress	Jessica Tandy	2nd Place	
New York Film Critics Circle Awards	Best Actor	Morgan Freeman	Runner-up	
New York Film Critics Circle Awards	Best Actress	Jessica Tandy	Runner-up	
New York Film Critics Circle Awards	Best Director	Bruce Beresford	Runner-up	
Political Film Society Awards	Human Rights		Nominated	
Producers Guild of America Awards	Outstanding Producer of Theatrical Motion Pictures	Richard D. Zanuck and Lili Fini Zanuck	Won	
Retirement Research Foundation, USA	Wise Owl Award – Television and Theatrical Film Fiction	David Brown, Richard D. Zanuck, and Lili Fini Zanuck	Nominated	
Writers Guild of America Awards	Best Screenplay – Based on Material from Another Medium	Alfred Uhry	Won	

The film is recognized by American Film Institute in these lists:

- AFI 100 Years 100 Cheers – No.77

=== Oscar "test of time" recount ===
In 2015, The Hollywood Reporter polled hundreds of academy members, asking them to re-vote on past close run decisions. Academy members indicated that, given a second chance, they would award the 1990 Oscar for Best Picture to My Left Foot instead.

== Soundtrack ==
The film's score was composed by Hans Zimmer, who won a BMI Film Music Award and was nominated for a Grammy Award for Best Instrumental Composition Written for a Motion Picture or for Television for his work. The score was performed entirely by Zimmer, done electronically using samplers and synthesizers, and did not feature a single live instrument. There is a scene, however, in which the "Song to the Moon" from the opera Rusalka by Antonín Dvořák is heard on a radio as sung by Slovak lyric soprano Gabriela Beňačková.

Similarities have been noted between the main theme and the folk song "Shortnin' Bread". The soundtrack was issued on Varèse Sarabande.

== Home media ==
The film was also successful on home video. It was released on DVD in the United States on April 30, 1997, and the special edition was released on February 4, 2003. The movie was first released on Blu-ray disc in Germany, and was finally released on Blu-ray in the United States in a special edition digibook in January 2013 by Warner Bros.

In the UK, Warner Home Video released Driving Miss Daisy on VHS in 1989. Driving Miss Daisy was then released on DVD in 2005 by Universal Pictures Home Entertainment and then in 2008 by Pathé through 20th Century Fox Home Entertainment.
