= Bernard Share =

Irish novelist, critic, editor, and lecturer

Bernard Share (1930–2013) was an Irish novelist, critic, editor, and lecturer on modern literature. His novels include Inish and Transit. He also wrote an account of World-War-II-era Irish life, titled The Emergency, and has published works on slang and notable quotations. Several of his works have been reissued by Dalkey Archive Press, as part of the John F. Byrne Irish Literature Series.

He was one of the founders, and the first secretary, of Publishing Ireland, the Irish booksellers' association.

== Publications ==
- Inish, Allen Figgis, Dublin, 1966 and Dalkey Archive Press [J. F. Byrne Irish Literature Series], Illinois, 2009, ISBN 978-1-56478-541-1
- Naming Names: Who, What, Where in Irish nomenclature: Who, What, Where in Ireland, Gill & Macmillan Ltd., Dublin, 2001, ISBN 0-7171-3125-4
- Irish Lives; Biographies of fifty famous Irish men and women, (with William Bolger) Figgis, Dublin, 1971, ISBN 0-9003-7241-9
- The Emergency: Neutral Ireland 1939–45, Gill & Macmillan, Dublin, 1978, ISBN 0-7171-1516 X
- The Flight of the Iolar: The Aer Lingus Experience 1936–1986, Gill & Macmillan, Dublin, 1986, ISBN 0-7171-1457-0
- Shannon Departures, Gill & Macmillan, Dublin, 1992, ISBN 0-7171-1830-4
- Bunratty : Rebirth of a Castle, Brandon Press, Dingle, 1995, ISBN 0-8632-2206-4
- Slanguage : A dictionary of slang and colloquial English in Ireland, Gill & Macmillan, Dublin, 1997, ISBN 0-7171-2353-7
- Dublinese : Know What I mean?, Doughcloyne, Cork, 2006, ISBN 1-9051-7207-9
- In time of Civil War : the conflict on the Irish railways, 1922-23, Collins Press, Cork, 2006, ISBN 1-9051-7211-7
