= Kevin Haney =

- Occupation: makeup artist
- Years active: 1982-Present

Kevin Haney is a makeup artist who won at the 1989 Academy Awards for Best Makeup for the film Driving Miss Daisy, which he shared with Lynn Barber and Manlio Rocchetti. He has worked on 70 films and TV shows since 1982, including quite a few that were nominated for best makeup, though only for one of his works was he nominated. His TV credits include Star Trek: Deep Space Nine and The X-Files.

== Selected filmography ==
- Captain America: The Winter Soldier (2014)
- Divergent (2014)
- Guardians of the Galaxy (2014)
- Iron Man 3 (2013)
- John Carter (2012)
- Alice in Wonderland (2010-uncredited)
- Star Trek (2009-uncredited)
- Indiana Jones and the Kingdom of the Crystal Skull (2008)
- The Santa Clause 3: The Escape Clause (2006)
- Men in Black II (2002-uncredited)
- Planet of the Apes (2001)
- How the Grinch Stole Christmas (2000)
- Austin Powers: The Spy Who Shagged Me (1999)
- Air Force One (1997)
- Hocus Pocus (1993)
- The Addams Family (1991)
- Dick Tracy (1990)
- Driving Miss Daisy (1989)
