= Lynn Barber (make-up artist) =

American make-up artist

- Occupation: Makeup artist
- Years active: 1986-Present

Lynn Barber is an American makeup artist. She won at the 1989 Academy Awards for Best Makeup for the film Driving Miss Daisy. Which she shared with Kevin Haney and Manlio Rocchetti.

She is also known for doing television makeup, such as Arrested Development and Savannah.

== Selected filmography ==
- CBGB (2013)
- Red Dawn (2012)
- Beverly Hills Chihuahua (2008)
- Delta Farce (2007)
- Georgia Rule (2007)
- The Dead Girl (2006)
- Silver City (2004)
- Adaptation. (2002)
- Donnie Darko (2001)
- Vertical Limit (2000)
- October Sky (1999)
- Wild America (1997)
- Driving Miss Daisy (1989)
