= My Left Foot =

1989 film by Jim Sheridan

- Theatrical release poster
- Directed by: Jim Sheridan
- Screenplay by: Shane Connaughton; Jim Sheridan
- Based on: My Left Foot by Christy Brown
- Produced by: Noel Pearson
- Starring: Daniel Day-Lewis; Ray McAnally; Brenda Fricker; Cyril Cusack; Fiona Shaw; Hugh O'Conor; Adrian Dunbar; Ruth McCabe; Alison Whelan
- Cinematography: Jack Conroy
- Edited by: J. Patrick Duffner
- Music by: Elmer Bernstein
- Production companies: Ferndale Films; Granada Film; Raidió Teilifís Éireann
- Distributed by: Palace Pictures
- Release date: 24 February 1989
- Running time: 103 minutes
- Countries: Ireland; United Kingdom
- Language: English
- Budget: £600,000
- Box office: $14.7 million

My Left Foot: The Story of Christy Brown is a 1989 biographical comedy-drama film directed by Jim Sheridan (in his directorial debut) and adapted by Sheridan and Shane Connaughton from the 1954 memoir by Christy Brown. A co-production of Ireland and the United Kingdom, it stars Daniel Day-Lewis as Brown, an Irish man born with cerebral palsy, who could control only his left foot. Brown grew up in a poor working-class family and became a writer and artist. Brenda Fricker, Ray McAnally, Hugh O'Conor, Fiona Shaw, and Cyril Cusack are featured in supporting roles.

The film was theatrically released on 24 February 1989 to critical acclaim and commercial success, grossing $14.7 million on a £600,000 budget. Reviewers praised the film's screenplay, direction, message, and especially the performances of Day-Lewis and Fricker. At the 62nd Academy Awards, the film received five nominations, including Best Picture, with Day-Lewis and Fricker winning Best Actor and Best Supporting Actress, respectively. In 2018, the British Film Institute ranked it as the 53rd greatest British film of the 20th century.

== Plot ==
In 1932, Christy Brown is born into a Dublin family of 15. Doctors discover he has severe cerebral palsy. Christy is unable to walk or talk. He is loved and supported by his family, especially his mother.

One day, Christy's mother trips down the stairs while in labour, and Christy is the only person home to see it. He alerts some neighbours to help. Christy's father never believed Christy would amount to anything, but becomes proud after witnessing him use his left foot, the only body part he can fully control, to write the word "mother" on the floor with a piece of chalk. Consequently, Christy seeks a hobby in painting. The neighbourhood youngsters include him in their activities, like street football, but when he paints a picture and gives it to a girl he likes, she returns it.

Later, his father loses his job and the family faces exceptionally difficult hardships, so Christy devises a plan to help his brothers steal coal to their mother's dismay. Christy's mother, who has been gradually gathering some savings in a tin in the fireplace, finally saves enough to buy him a wheelchair.

Christy is then introduced to Eileen Cole, who takes him to her school for cerebral palsy patients and persuades a friend of hers to hold an exhibition of his work. Christy falls in love with Cole, but when he learns during the dinner that she is engaged to be married, he considers suicide. His mother helps him build a private studio for himself, but soon afterward his father dies of a stroke, and during the wake Christy instigates a brawl. At this point, Christy starts writing his autobiography, My Left Foot. Cole returns and they resume their friendship.

Later, Christy attends a charity event where he meets his handler, a nurse named Mary Carr. She begins reading his autobiography. He asks Mary to go out with him and they then happily leave the fête together, and onscreen text reveals that they married on October 5, 1972.

== Cast ==
- Daniel Day-Lewis as Christy Brown, a man born with cerebral palsy
  - Hugh O'Conor as Young Christy Brown
- Brenda Fricker as Bridget Fagan Brown, Christy's mother
- Ray McAnally as Patrick Brown, Christy's father
- Fiona Shaw as Eileen Cole, Christy's carer
- Kirsten Sheridan as Sharon Brown, Christy's sister
- Alison Whelan as Sheila Brown, Christy's sister
- Eanna MacLiam as Benny Brown, Christy's brother
- Declan Croghan as Tom Brown, Christy's brother
- Marie Conmee as Sadie Brown, Christy's sister
- Cyril Cusack as Lord Castlewelland
- Phelim Drew as Brian Brown, Christy's brother
- Eileen Colgan as Nan
- Ruth McCabe as Mary Carr, Christy's handler and eventual wife
- Adrian Dunbar as Peter, Cole's fiancé

== Production ==
Day-Lewis became interested in the project when he read the opening scene, which features him, as Brown, using his left foot to place a phonograph record on a player and then placing a needle onto it so that it will play. He said of the scene: "I knew it couldn't be done... and that intrigued me." Many scenes were filmed through a mirror, as he could only manipulate his right foot to perform the actions seen in the film. He spent some time preparing for the film at Brown's alma mater in Dublin. He later returned there for a visit, with his Academy Award.

Day-Lewis is known for his extreme method acting and insisted on staying in character during the production of the film, refusing to do anything that Brown could not do. This meant that members of the film crew had to move the actor around in a wheelchair, lift him over obstacles, and even feed him.

== Reception ==
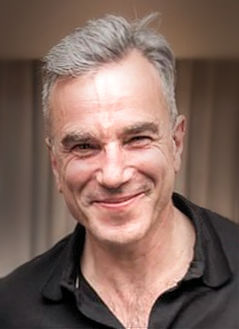
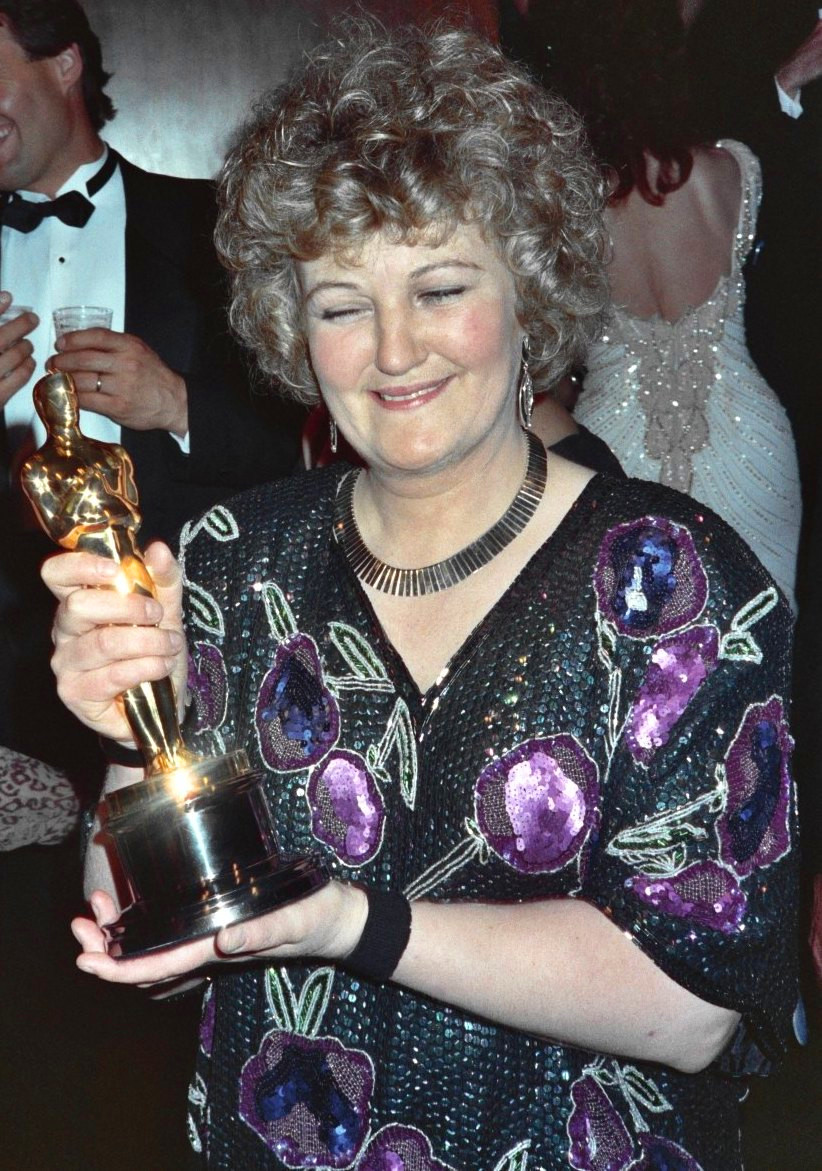
Daniel Day-Lewis and Brenda Fricker earned Academy Awards for Best Actor and Best Supporting Actress.

=== Critical response ===
My Left Foot received widespread critical acclaim. On the review aggregator website Rotten Tomatoes, 98% of 44 critics' reviews are positive, with an average rating of 8.2/10. The website's consensus reads: "No doubt most will come to My Left Foot for Daniel Day-Lewis's performance, but the movie's refusal to go downbeat will keep it in viewers' minds afterwards." Metacritic, which uses a weighted average, assigned the film a score of 97 out of 100, based on 18 critics, indicating "universal acclaim".

Roger Ebert gave the film four out of four stars, writing: "My Left Foot is a great film for many reasons, but the most important is that it gives us such a complete picture of this man's life. It is not an inspirational movie, although it inspires. It is not a sympathetic movie, although it inspires sympathy. It is the story of a stubborn, difficult, blessed, and gifted man who was dealt a bad hand, who played it brilliantly, and who left us some good books, some good paintings and the example of his courage. It must not have been easy."

In 2015, The Hollywood Reporter polled hundreds of academy members, asking them to re-vote on past controversial decisions. Academy members indicated that, given a second chance, they would award the 1990 Academy Award for Best Picture to My Left Foot instead of Driving Miss Daisy.

=== Accolades ===
List of awards and nominations
Award	Date of ceremony	Category	Recipient(s)	Result
Academy Awards	26 March 1990	Best Picture	Noel Pearson	Nominated
Academy Awards	26 March 1990	Best Director	Jim Sheridan	Nominated
Academy Awards	26 March 1990	Best Actor	Daniel Day-Lewis	Won
Academy Awards	26 March 1990	Best Supporting Actress	Brenda Fricker	Won
Academy Awards	26 March 1990	Best Adapted Screenplay	Shane Connaughton and Jim Sheridan	Nominated
British Academy Film Awards	11 March 1990	Best Film	My Left Foot	Nominated
British Academy Film Awards	11 March 1990	Best Actor	Daniel Day-Lewis	Won
British Academy Film Awards	11 March 1990	Best Supporting Actor	Ray McAnally (posthumous)	Won
British Academy Film Awards	11 March 1990	Best Adapted Screenplay	Shane Connaughton and Jim Sheridan	Nominated
British Academy Film Awards	11 March 1990	Best Makeup	Ken Jennings	Nominated
European Film Awards	25 November 1989	Young European Film of the Year	My Left Foot	Nominated
European Film Awards	25 November 1989	European Director of the Year	Jim Sheridan	Nominated
European Film Awards	25 November 1989	European Actor of the Year	Daniel Day-Lewis	Nominated
Golden Globe Awards	20 January 1990	Best Actor – Motion Picture Drama	Daniel Day-Lewis	Nominated
Golden Globe Awards	20 January 1990	Best Supporting Actress – Motion Picture	Brenda Fricker	Nominated
Independent Spirit Awards	24 March 1990	Best Foreign Film	My Left Foot	Won
Los Angeles Film Critics Association	16 January 1990	Best Actor	Daniel Day-Lewis	Won
Los Angeles Film Critics Association	16 January 1990	Best Supporting Actress	Brenda Fricker	Won
National Board of Review	26 February 1990	Top Ten Films	My Left Foot	Won
National Society of Film Critics	8 January 1990	Best Actor	Daniel Day-Lewis	Won
New York Film Critics Circle	14 January 1990	Best Film	My Left Foot	Won
New York Film Critics Circle	14 January 1990	Best Actor	Daniel Day-Lewis	Won
Writers Guild of America Awards	18 March 1990	Best Screenplay Based on Material from Another Medium	Shane Connaughton and Jim Sheridan	Nominated
Young Artist Awards	March or April 1990	Best Young Actor Supporting Role in a Motion Picture	Hugh O'Conor	Won
Young Artist Awards	March or April 1990	Best Motion Picture – Drama	My Left Foot	Nominated

== See also ==
- BFI Top 100 British films
- List of 1990s films based on actual events
