= Publishing Ireland =

Publishing Ireland (Foilsiú Éireann) is the Irish Book Publishers' Association.

Publishing Ireland was founded as CLÉ – Irish Book Publishers’ Association in 1970. It has 106 members, 93 of whom are professional book-publishing companies.

== Members ==
- An Gúm
- Blackhall Publishing
- Blackstaff Press
- Chartered Accountants Ireland
- Liberties Press
- Maverick House Publishers
- Mercier Press
- O'Brien Press

== See also ==
- International Publishers Association
