= Sex, Lies, and Videotape =

1989 film by Steven Soderbergh

- Theatrical release poster
- Directed by: Steven Soderbergh
- Written by: Steven Soderbergh
- Produced by: Nancy Tenenbaum; John Hardy; Robert Newmyer
- Starring: James Spader; Andie MacDowell; Peter Gallagher; Laura San Giacomo
- Cinematography: Walt Lloyd
- Edited by: Steven Soderbergh
- Music by: Cliff Martinez
- Production company: Outlaw Productions
- Distributed by: Miramax Films
- Release dates: January 20, 1989 (Sundance Film Festival); August 18, 1989 (United States)
- Running time: 100 minutes
- Country: United States
- Language: English
- Budget: $1.2 million
- Box office: $36.7 million

Sex, Lies, and Videotape (often written in all lowercase as sex, lies, and videotape) is a 1989 American independent drama film written and directed by Steven Soderbergh. The plot tells the story of a troubled man who videotapes women discussing their sexuality and fantasies, and its impact on the relationships of a troubled married couple and the wife's younger sister.

Sex, Lies, and Videotape won the Palme d'Or at the 1989 Cannes Film Festival, making Soderbergh the youngest solo director to win the award; he was 26 at the time. The film received widespread praise from critics and was influential in revolutionizing the independent film movement in the early 1990s. In 2006, Sex, Lies, and Videotape was selected for preservation the United States Library of Congress' National Film Registry, deemed "culturally, historically, or aesthetically significant".

== Plot ==
Ann Bishop Mullany lives in Baton Rouge, unhappily but comfortably married to John, a successful lawyer. She is in therapy, where she reveals that she is repulsed by the idea of him touching her.

Graham Dalton, an old close college friend of John and now a drifter with some money saved up, visits Baton Rouge to see John and perhaps stay in the city. When he arrives at their home, he meets Ann, who learns that John has invited Graham to stay with them until he finds an apartment. When John arrives home, Graham's demeanor becomes remarkably more guarded; though he realizes he now has nothing in common with John, he and Ann get along well.

John is having an affair with Ann's sister Cynthia, a free-spirited artist and bartender, which he rationalizes by blaming Ann's frigidity. Ann helps Graham look for an apartment. Once he has a place, she makes an impromptu visit and notices stacks of camcorder videotapes, labeled with women's names. When asked, Graham explains that they contain interviews with women about their deepest sexual desires and fantasies. Uncomfortable, Ann abruptly leaves.

The next day, Cynthia appears uninvited at Graham's apartment and presses Graham to explain what "spooked" Ann. He reluctantly explains it was the videotapes that disturbed her and that he achieves gratification by watching the videos in private. Graham propositions Cynthia to make an interview tape, assuring her that only he will see it. She agrees, and later tells Ann about the experience. She is horrified, as is John, when Cynthia later tells him.

Cleaning her home the next day, Ann discovers Cynthia's pearl earring in her bedroom while vacuuming and deduces her affair with John. Furious, Ann goes to Graham's apartment with the intention of making a videotape. He objects, but she is insistent.

Later, Ann demands a divorce from John and reveals that she made a tape with Graham. John immediately becomes enraged so that he seems ready to strike Ann, but instead rushes to Graham's apartment and assaults Graham, punching him in the face, then dragging him outside and locking him out, then watches Ann's tape. In the video, Ann says she has never felt any kind of "satisfaction" from sex. Graham asks if she ever thinks of having sex with other men; she admits she has thought of Graham.

Ann turns the camera on Graham, who resists opening up but soon confesses that he is haunted by his ex-girlfriend Elizabeth and that his motivation in returning to Baton Rouge was an attempt to achieve some closure. He explains that he was a pathological liar, which destroyed his relationship with her. Graham has since gone to great lengths to avoid people and relationships. Ann kisses him, then he turns off the camcorder, ending the tape.

An unhinged John joins Graham on the front porch and, with intense viciousness, claims to have had sex with Elizabeth while she and Graham were a couple, saying: "She was no saint. She was good in bed, and she could keep a secret. That's all I can say about her." After he leaves, a distraught Graham destroys his camcorder and all of the videotapes.

Some time later, John is urgently summoned to his boss's office. Ann and Cynthia reconcile at the bar Cynthia tends. Later, Ann goes to Graham's and joins him on the front porch. She predicts rain, to which he replies: "It is raining."

== Cast ==
- James Spader as Graham Dalton
- Andie MacDowell as Ann Bishop Mullany
- Peter Gallagher as John Mullany
- Laura San Giacomo as Cynthia Patrice Bishop
- Steven Brill as Barfly
- Ron Vawter as Therapist

== Production ==
The film was written by Steven Soderbergh in eight days on a yellow legal pad during a cross country trip (although, as Soderbergh points out in his DVD commentary track, he had been thinking about the film for a year).

Soderbergh's commentary also reveals that he had written Andie MacDowell's role with Elizabeth McGovern in mind, but McGovern's agent disliked the script so much that McGovern never even got to read it. Laura San Giacomo, who was represented by the same agency, had to threaten to leave that agency in order to be able to play Cynthia. Soderbergh was reluctant to audition MacDowell but she surprised him, getting the role after two extremely successful auditions. The role of John would have been played by Tim Daly, but delays in completing the financing for the film led to Peter Gallagher's getting the role instead as Daly was cast in the TV series Almost Grown.

A week of rehearsal and a month-long shoot in August 1988 were all Soderbergh could afford with a budget of only $1.2 million. He would later call it: “the only movie I’ve ever made where I felt like I had all the money and all the time I needed.” Principal photography took place in Baton Rouge, Louisiana.

== Reception ==
=== Box office ===
Sex, Lies, and Videotape opened in a limited release of four theaters on August 4, 1989 and grossed $155,982, with an average of 30 patrons per showing in the first two to three weeks; the studio released the film nationwide. The widest release for the film was 534 theaters and it ended up earning $24,741,667 in the United States, and around $36.74 million worldwide.

=== Critical response ===
Sex, Lies, and Videotape was well received in its initial release in 1989. On the review aggregator website Rotten Tomatoes, 96% of 56 critics' reviews are positive, with an average rating of 8.1/10. The website's consensus reads: "In his feature directorial debut, Steven Soderbergh demonstrates a mastery of his craft well beyond his years, pulling together an outstanding cast and an intelligent script for a nuanced, mature film about neurosis and human sexuality." The film also has a score of 86 out of 100 on Metacritic based on 17 reviews indicating "universal acclaim".

In 2006, Sex, Lies, and Videotape was selected for preservation in the United States National Film Registry by the Library of Congress as being deemed "culturally, historically, or aesthetically significant".

=== Accolades ===
At the 1989 Cannes Film Festival, the film won the Palme d'Or and the FIPRESCI Prize, with Spader getting the Best Actor Award. It also won an Audience Award at the Sundance Film Festival. Soderbergh was nominated for an Academy Award for his screenplay.

Award	Date of ceremony	Category	Recipient(s)	Result	Ref(s)
Academy Awards	March 26, 1990	Best Original Screenplay	Steven Soderbergh	Nominated	
British Academy Film Awards	March 11, 1990	Best Original Screenplay	Steven Soderbergh	Nominated	
British Academy Film Awards	March 11, 1990	Best Supporting Actress	Laura San Giacomo	Nominated	
Cannes Film Festival	May 11–23, 1989	Palme d'Or	Steven Soderbergh	Won	
Cannes Film Festival	May 11–23, 1989	FIPRESCI Prize	Steven Soderbergh	Won	
Cannes Film Festival	May 11–23, 1989	Best Actor	James Spader	Won	
César Awards	March 4, 1990	Best Foreign Film	Steven Soderbergh	Nominated	
Independent Spirit Awards	March 24, 1990	Best Feature		Won	
Independent Spirit Awards	March 24, 1990	Best Director	Steven Soderbergh	Won	
Independent Spirit Awards	March 24, 1990	Best Actor	James Spader	Nominated	
Independent Spirit Awards	March 24, 1990	Best Actress	Andie MacDowell	Won	
Independent Spirit Awards	March 24, 1990	Best Supporting Actress	Laura San Giacomo	Won	
Golden Globe Awards	January 20, 1990	Best Screenplay	Steven Soderbergh	Nominated	
Golden Globe Awards	January 20, 1990	Best Actress in a Motion Picture – Drama	Andie MacDowell	Nominated	
Golden Globe Awards	January 20, 1990	Best Supporting Actress	Laura San Giacomo	Nominated	
Los Angeles Film Critics Association	December 16, 1989	Best Actress	Andie MacDowell	Won	
Los Angeles Film Critics Association	December 16, 1989	New Generation Award	Laura San Giacomo	Won	
National Board of Review	December 13, 1989	Top Ten Films		Won	
Sundance Film Festival	1989	Audience Award	Steven Soderbergh	Won	
Writers Guild of America	1989	Best Screenplay	Steven Soderbergh	Nominated	

== Home media ==
The DVD includes a "director's dialogue" between Soderbergh and playwright/director Neil LaBute, recorded in 1998. LaBute's presence leads to conversational tangents unrelated to the film, although most of the tangents are related to the question of what it means to be a director, and are intended, as Soderbergh summarizes at the end, to "demystify" the process of making a film. LaBute's presence prompts Soderbergh to talk about reverse zooms, dolly shots, how actors have varying expectations of their director, the difference between stealing from a film you admire and paying tribute to it, shooting out of sequence, how the role of a director changes as their successes (and their budgets) grow, and other filmmaking topics.

== Adaptations ==
The movie was presented as a staged play in Hollywood at the Next Stage from December 13, 2003, to January 17, 2004. Directed by Seth Wiley and a cast that featured Amanda Bauman (Ann), Emily Williams (Therapist), Shauna Slade (Cynthia), Justin Christenson (Graham) and Jack Sundmacher (John).

== Full Frontal: "an unofficial sequel of sorts" ==
A sequel was announced in 2001 and Catherine Keener was the first actor attached to the project, named How to Survive a Hotel Room Fire. It was billed by Miramax as "an unofficial sequel of sorts." In October, it was announced that the movie would star Julia Roberts, David Hyde Pierce and David Duchovny. After the September 11 attacks, the title was changed to The Art of Negotiating a Turn. Miramax head Harvey Weinstein did not like the new title, and consequently Soderbergh suggested the title, Full Frontal, under which the film was released.

== Possible sequel ==
In May 2020, Soderbergh revealed that he wrote a sequel during the coronavirus quarantine. In December of that year, he stated that the sequel would be "about the two sisters 30 years later. One of them has had a child who is about the same age that she was in the original." He also said that MacDowell and San Giacomo agreed to reprise their roles.
