= Laura San Giacomo =

American actress (born 1961/1962)

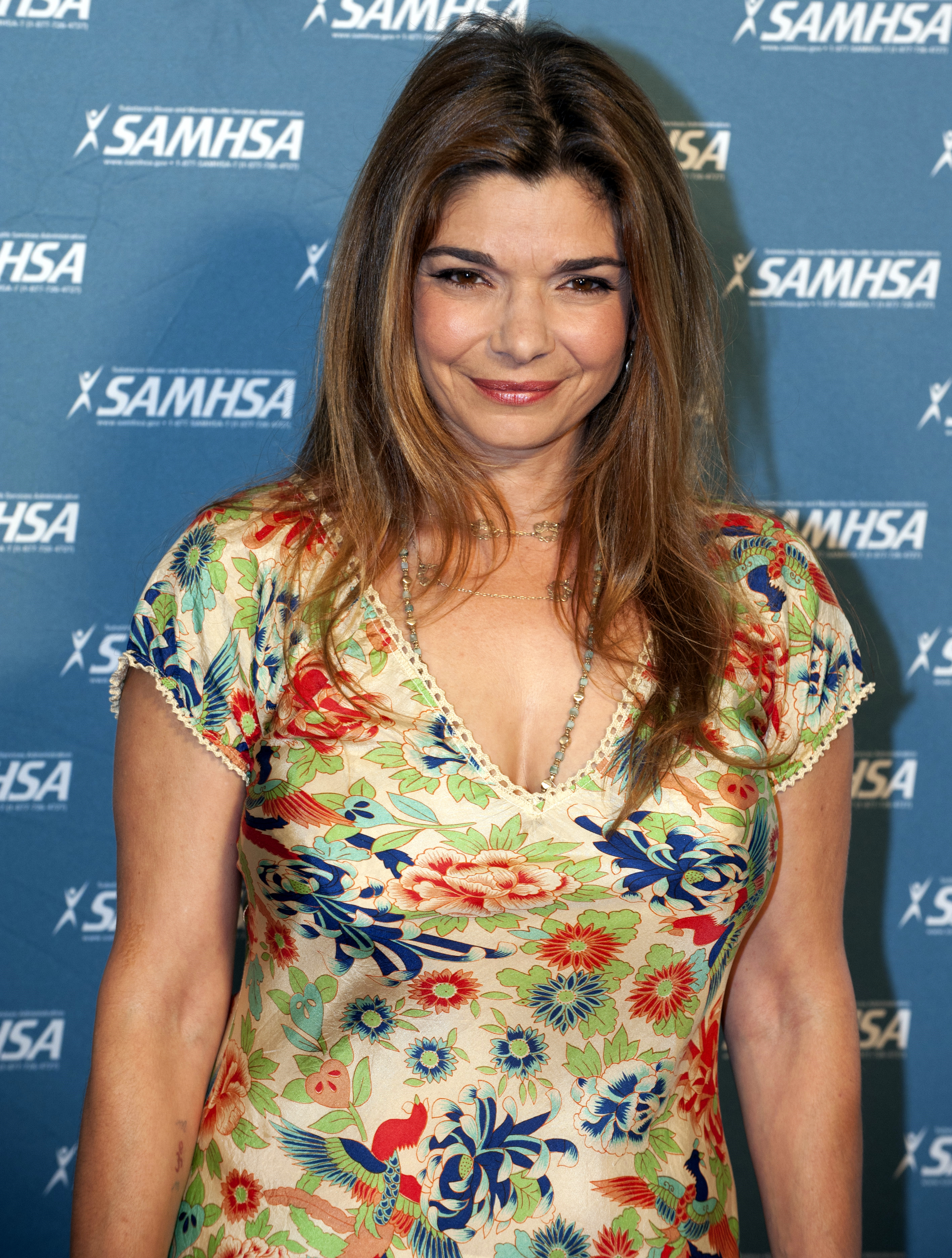
- San Giacomo at Voice Awards in August 2011
- Born: November 14, 1961 (age 65) or November 14, 1962 (age 64); West Orange, New Jersey, U.S.
- Education: Carnegie Mellon University (BFA)
- Occupation: Actress
- Years active: 1987–present
- Spouses: Cameron Dye (m. 1990; div. 1998) Matt Adler (m. 2000)
- Children: 1

Laura San Giacomo (Note: Pronounced /sæn dʒəˈkoʊmoʊ/, san jə-KOH-moh.) (born November 14, 1961 or 1962) is an American actress. She played Cynthia in the film Sex, Lies, and Videotape (1989) for which she won the Independent Spirit Award for Best Supporting Female, Kit De Luca in the film Pretty Woman (1990), Crazy Cora in the film Quigley Down Under (1990), Nadine Cross in The Stand (1994), and Maya Gallo on the sitcom Just Shoot Me! (1997–2003). A BAFTA and two-time Golden Globe Award nominee, she played the regular role of Rhetta Rodriguez on the drama Saving Grace (2007–2010), and the recurring role of Dr. Grace Confalone on the drama NCIS (2016–2024).

== Early life and education ==
San Giacomo is an Italian-American. She grew up in Denville, New Jersey, and went to school at Morris Knolls High School where she became involved in drama, starring in school plays. Thereafter, she graduated with a fine arts degree from Carnegie Mellon University where she studied acting.

== Career ==
After graduating, she moved to New York. San Giacomo then went on to appear in several theater productions, including the Garry Marshall–Lowell Ganz production of Wrong Turn at Lungfish in Los Angeles, the Princeton/McCarter Theatre production of Three Sisters, and off-Broadway in Beirut. She starred in Italian American Reconciliation, regional productions of Shakespeare's The Tempest, As You Like It and Romeo and Juliet as well as Crimes of the Heart. In a review of the Walnut Street Theatre 1986 presentation of As You Like It, San Giacomo received a special mention: "although doll-like Laura San Giacomo had only a minor role as a wilful shepherdess, she sank her fangs into it and received the only show-interrupting applause of the evening."

=== Early career ===
San Giacomo's first television appearances were four episodes on three television series during 1987. Two notable appearances were in Crime Story in 1988 for the episode "Protected Witness" (season 2/episode 13) as Theresa Farantino and in Miami Vice in 1989 for the episode "Leap of Faith" (season 5, episode 21) as Tania Lewis. The Miami Vice episode also featured a guest appearance by her future husband, actor Cameron Dye, one year before their marriage. Previously, she was featured on the daytime soap opera All My Children as Louisa Sanchez, the Latina common-law wife of Mitch Beck (Brian Fitzpatrick) whose presence threatened to thwart his relationship with Hillary Martin (Carmen Thomas).

San Giacomo first drew international attention in Steven Soderbergh's Sex, Lies, and Videotape (1989), which was her film debut as a credited actor (in the 1988 movie Miles from Home, her role as Sandy was not credited). Her work in the film was nominated for a Golden Globe Award, and she received a Los Angeles Film Critics Association New Generation Award. The film was honored with the Cannes Film Festival's prestigious Palme d'Or.

In 1990, San Giacomo played a supporting role as Julia Roberts's character's wisecracking roommate Kit De Luca in Pretty Woman. The film generated $178 million at the box office.

San Giacomo also has appeared in Quigley Down Under (1990), Vital Signs (1990), Under Suspicion (1991), Once Around (1991), Where the Day Takes You (1992), Nina Takes a Lover (1994), and Suicide Kings (1997). She also appeared as Nadine Cross in the Stephen King miniseries The Stand with Rob Lowe, which landed them on the cover of the May 7–13, 1994 issue of TV Guide. She continued doing films, and as 1999 ended, she appeared in the film Eat Your Heart Out. In 2001, San Giacomo landed the starring role in the Jenifer Estess bio-pic Jenifer.

San Giacomo did voice work for the animated series Gargoyles (as the character of Fox). However, she went uncredited for the role because her agent believed it would damage her reputation to have worked on an animated series.

=== Just Shoot Me! ===
Needing to work, but not wanting to be away from her newborn son for months at a time, San Giacomo shifted to television in the role of hot-tempered, sassy journalist Maya Gallo in Just Shoot Me! (1997–2003). Her character was partially based on an unproduced idea that executive producer Steven Levitan once had in mind for actress Janeane Garofalo when he was a writer for The Larry Sanders Show. San Giacomo was cast in the starring role because the series was meant to center on her character; however, the show soon adopted an ensemble style. Despite the shift in focus, San Giacomo remained an integral part of the show, and she received top billing. She and the four other main cast members appeared in all 148 episodes of the series, which lasted until 2003.

San Giacomo's work during season 2 (1997–1998) earned her a Golden Globe Award nomination in 1998 for Best Actress in a Television Comedy or Musical.

=== Continued work ===
After NBC cancelled Just Shoot Me! in 2003, San Giacomo appeared sporadically on television and in films. She made guest appearances on several television series, including the short-lived crime drama The Handler in 2003 and Unscripted in 2005. She was the narrator for the series Snapped: Killer Couples. San Giacomo also appeared in the 2005 films Checking Out and Havoc as well as the 2006 film Conquistadora. San Giacomo was to have made her return to television on The WB's new drama Related in 2005, but the character was recast due to creative differences. Kiele Sanchez took her place as Anne Sorelli on the show. San Giacomo made her first public appearance in nearly a year on 19 October 2005 at the 15th Annual Environmental Media Awards. She made two more public appearances at the Crystal and Lucy Awards on 6 June 2006 and at the 3rd Annual Alfred Mann Foundation Innovation and Inspiration Gala on 9 September 2006.

In 2006, San Giacomo returned to network television with three guest appearances on the third season of Veronica Mars. She reunited with Enrico Colantoni from Just Shoot Me!, playing Harmony Chase. Both Colantoni and San Giacomo enjoyed their reunion so much that they lobbied for their characters to appear together in more episodes.

In September 2006, San Giacomo secured her first starring role on a television program after Just Shoot Me! when she reunited with fellow Carnegie-Mellon alum Holly Hunter in the series Saving Grace. San Giacomo played Grace's best friend Rhetta Rodriguez.

In June 2010, San Giacomo guest-starred in the episode titled "Death Becomes Her" on the series In Plain Sight. She played a woman from an organized crime family with a terminal illness. In December 2011, San Giacomo appeared on the episode titled "Beards" on Hot in Cleveland as Caroline, Melanie's estranged sister.

== Personal life ==
San Giacomo has been married twice. Her first marriage (1990–1998) was to actor Cameron Dye, with whom she had a son who was born with cerebral palsy. In 2000, she remarried, to actor Matt Adler. She is a cousin of Torry Castellano, former drummer of the rock group The Donnas.

She lives in the San Fernando Valley, California.

== Philanthropy ==
San Giacomo has been honored by the American Academy for Cerebral Palsy and Developmental Medicine, by Media Access for a TV public service announcement on "Inclusive Education" (in The More You Know), by Shane's Inspiration with its Humanitarian Award, and Redbook's Mother and Shaker Award. She has been a keynote speaker at various conferences for TASH and CalTASH, which promote an inclusive society, and at two conferences sponsored by the U.S. Department of Education, and at the Young Neuroscientists' Workshop for the Children's Neurobiological Solutions Foundation (now the Pediatric Brain Foundation).

In 2021, she was listed as the board secretary of the international wheelchair-charity Momentum Wheels for Humanity, and honorary chair of the Environment of People Foundation, Inc., a charity promoting music opportunities for children.

== Filmography ==
=== Film ===
Year	Title	Role	Notes
1988	Miles from Home	Sandy	Uncredited
1989	Sex, Lies, and Videotape	Cynthia Patrice Bishop	Chicago Film Critics Association Award for Best Supporting Actress; Chicago Film Critics Association Award for Most Promising Actress; Independent Spirit Award for Best Supporting Female; Los Angeles Film Critics Association: New Generation Award; Nominated – BAFTA Award for Best Actress in a Supporting Role; Nominated – Golden Globe Award for Best Supporting Actress – Motion Picture; Nominated – New York Film Critics Circle Award for Best Supporting Actress
1990	Pretty Woman	Kit De Luca	
1990	Vital Signs	Lauren Rose	
1990	Quigley Down Under	Crazy Cora	
1991	Once Around	Jan Bella	
1991	Under Suspicion	Angeline	
1992	Where the Day Takes You	The Interviewer	
1994	Nina Takes a Lover	Nina	
1995	Stuart Saves His Family	Julia	
1995	The Snow Queen	Robber Girl	Voice; English dub
1997	The Apocalypse	Goad	
1997	Suicide Kings	Lydia	
1998	With Friends Like These...	Joanne Hersh	
1999	Eat Your Heart Out	Jacqueline Fosburg	
2003	A House on a Hill	Gaby	
2005	Checking Out	Flo Applebaum	Palm Beach International Film Festival Award for Best Actress
2005	Havoc	Joanna Lang	
2011	Few Options	Bus Ticket Agent	
2012	Least Among Saints	Jolene	
2015	The Meddler	TV Mom	
2019	Honey Boy	Dr. Moreno	
2021	Violet	Janice	

=== Television ===
Year	Title	Role	Notes
1987	All My Children	Luisa	Episode #1.46002
1987	Spenser: For Hire	Sharon	Episode: "On the Night He Was Betrayed"
1988	Crime Story	Theresa Farantino	Episode: "Protected Witness"
1989	The Equalizer	Trudy Collins	Episode: "The Caper"
1989	Miami Vice	Tania Louis	Episode: "Leap of Faith"
1993	For Their Own Good	Jo Mandell	TV movie
1994	The Stand	Nadine Cross	TV miniseries
1994–1997	Gargoyles	Fox	Voice, recurring role
1995	Fallen Angels	Peggy	Episode: "Fly Paper"
1996	The Right to Remain Silent	Nicole Savita	TV movie
1997–2003	Just Shoot Me!	Maya Gallo	149 episodes Nominated – Golden Globe Award for Best Actress – Television Series Musical or Comedy
1999	The Secret Files of the Spy Dogs	Agent Nine	Voice, episode: "Zero"
1999	Batman Beyond	Mary Michaels / Freon	Voice, episode: "Heroes"
2001	Sister Mary Explains It All	Angela DiMarco	TV movie
2001	Jenifer	Jenifer Estess	TV movie
2003	The Electric Piper	Mrs. Robinson	Voice, TV movie
2003	The Handler	Karen	Episode: "Homewrecker's Ball"
2006	Related	Ann Sorelli	Episode: "Pilot"
2006	Veronica Mars	Harmony Chase	Recurring
2007–2010	Saving Grace	Rhetta Rodriguez	46 episodes
2010	In Plain Sight	Mia Cusato	Episode: "Death Becomes Her"
2010	The Defenders	Judge Anna Desanti	Episode: "Nevada v. Sen. Harper"
2010	Medium	Susannah Collings	Episode: "The People in Your Neighborhood"
2011	Hot in Cleveland	Caroline	Episode: "Beards"
2012	TalhotBlond	Carol	Television film
2013	The Mentalist	Miriam Gottlieb	Episode: "Red John's Rules"
2016	Recovery Road	Gina	Episode: "(Be)Coming Clean"
2016	Full Circle	Elena Medina	10 episodes
2016–2024	NCIS	Grace Confalone	Recurring
2017–2018	Animal Kingdom	Morgan Wilson	Recurring
2018	Grey's Anatomy	Marjorie Kersey	Episode: "Caught Somewhere in Time"
2021	The Movies That Made Us	Herself	Episode: "Pretty Woman"
2022	Barry	Annie Eisner	4 episodes
2022	As We See It	Deb	2 episodes
2022–2023	The Santa Clauses	La Befana	7 episodes
2026	Margo's Got Money Troubles	Tessa	Recurring
2026	Sugar	Peg	Recurring
