= Crimes and Misdemeanors =

1989 film by Woody Allen

- Theatrical release poster
- Directed by: Woody Allen
- Written by: Woody Allen
- Produced by: Robert Greenhut
- Starring: Caroline Aaron; Alan Alda; Woody Allen; Claire Bloom; Mia Farrow; Joanna Gleason; Anjelica Huston; Martin Landau; Jenny Nichols; Jerry Orbach; Sam Waterston
- Cinematography: Sven Nykvist
- Edited by: Susan E. Morse
- Music by: Franz Schubert
- Production companies: Jack Rollins & Charles H. Joffe Productions
- Distributed by: Orion Pictures
- Release date: October 13, 1989 (United States)
- Running time: 104 minutes
- Country: United States
- Language: English
- Box office: $18.3 million

Crimes and Misdemeanors is a 1989 American existential comedy-drama film written and directed by Woody Allen, who stars alongside Martin Landau, Mia Farrow, Anjelica Huston, Jerry Orbach, Alan Alda, Sam Waterston, and Joanna Gleason.

Crimes and Misdemeanors was released by Orion Pictures on October 13, 1989. The film was met with critical acclaim, receiving three Academy Award nominations: Allen, for Best Director and Best Original Screenplay, and Landau, for Best Actor in a Supporting Role. Several publications have ranked Crimes and Misdemeanors as one of Allen's greatest films.

== Plot ==
The story follows two main characters: Judah Rosenthal, a successful and reputable ophthalmologist, and Clifford Stern, a small-time documentary filmmaker.

Judah, an upper class respected family man, is having an affair with flight attendant Dolores Paley. After it becomes clear to her that Judah will not end his marriage, Dolores threatens to disclose the affair to Judah's wife, Miriam. She is also aware of some questionable financial deals Judah made before becoming a wealthy ophthalmologist, which adds to his stress. He confides in a patient, Ben, a rabbi who is rapidly losing his eyesight. Ben advises openness and honesty between Judah and his wife, but Judah does not wish to imperil his marriage. Desperate, Judah turns to his brother, Jack, a gangster, who hires a hitman to kill Dolores. Before her corpse is discovered, Judah retrieves letters and other items from her apartment in order to cover his tracks. Stricken with guilt, Judah turns to the religious teachings he had rejected, believing for the first time that a just God is watching him and passing judgment.

Cliff, meanwhile, has been hired by his pompous brother-in-law, Lester, a successful television producer, to make a documentary celebrating Lester's life and work. Cliff grows to despise him. While filming and mocking the subject, Cliff falls in love with Lester's associate producer, Halley Reed. Despondent over his failing marriage to Lester's sister Wendy, he woos Halley, showing her footage from his ongoing documentary about Professor Louis Levy, a renowned philosopher. He ensures Halley is aware that he is shooting Lester's documentary merely for the money so he can finish his more meaningful project with Levy.

Cliff learns that Professor Levy, whom he had been profiling for a documentary centered on his philosophical views and the strength of his celebration of life, has committed suicide, leaving a curt note that only says: "I've gone out the window". When Halley visits to comfort him, he makes a pass at her, which she gently rebuffs, telling him she is not ready for another romance. Cliff's dislike for Lester becomes evident during the first screening of the film. Cliff has maliciously edited the film, which juxtaposes footage of Lester with clownish poses of Benito Mussolini addressing a throng of supporters from a balcony. It also shows Lester yelling at his employees and clumsily making a pass at an attractive young actress. Lester fires him.

Adding to Cliff's burdens, Halley leaves for London for a producer position. When she returns several months later, Cliff is astounded to discover that she and Lester are engaged. Hearing that Lester sent Halley white roses "round the clock, for days" when he unexpectedly met her in London, Cliff is crestfallen as Halley falling for Lester is his “worst fear realized.” His last romantic gesture to Halley had been a love letter which he had mostly plagiarized from James Joyce, including references to Dublin.

Judah and Cliff meet by happenstance at the wedding of the daughter of Rabbi Ben, who is Cliff's brother-in-law and Judah's patient. Judah has worked through his guilt and is enjoying life once more; the murder had been blamed on a drifter with a criminal record. He draws Cliff into a supposedly hypothetical discussion that draws upon his moral quandary. Judah says that with time, any crisis will pass; but Cliff morosely claims that “very few guys could live with that on their conscience.” Judah cheerfully leaves the wedding party with his wife, and Cliff is left sitting alone, dejected.

The wedding party continues. Rabbi Ben, who is now blind, shares a dance with his daughter while the voice of Professor Levy is heard, saying that the universe is a dark and indifferent place which human beings fill with love, in the hope that “future generations will understand more.”

== Cast ==
- Alan Alda as Lester
- Woody Allen as Cliff Stern
- Martin Landau as Judah Rosenthal
- Mia Farrow as Halley Reed
- Anjelica Huston as Dolores Paley
- Jerry Orbach as Jack Rosenthal
- Sam Waterston as Ben
- Joanna Gleason as Wendy Stern
- Caroline Aaron as Barbara
- Claire Bloom as Miriam Rosenthal
- Jenny Nichols as Jenny
- Martin S. Bergmann as Professor Louis Levy
- Frances Conroy as House Owner
- Nora Ephron as Wedding Guest
- Dolores Sutton as Judah's Secretary
- Daryl Hannah as Lisa
- Zina Jasper as Carol

== Production ==
After viewing the first cut of Crimes and Misdemeanors, Woody Allen chose to get rid of the first act, call back actors for reshoots, and focus on what turned out to be the film's central story.

=== Music ===
Allen makes use of classical and jazz music in many of the film's scenes. The soundtrack includes Franz Schubert's String Quartet No. 15 (a recording by the Juilliard String Quartet), which is used in the scenes leading up to Dolores' death, and Judah discovering her body.

=== Influences ===
The outline of Judah's moral dilemma—whether a person can continue everyday life with the knowledge of having committed murder—evokes the pivotal idea of Russian novelist Fyodor Dostoevsky's Crime and Punishment (1866), despite suggesting a resolution nearly opposite to that of the novel.

== Soundtrack ==
- Rosalie (1937) – Written by Cole Porter – Performed by The Jazz Band
- Excerpt from the Soundtrack of 'Mr. & Mrs. Smith' (1941) – Music by Edward Ward
- Dancing on the Ceiling (1930) – Music by Richard Rodgers – Performed by Bernie Leighton
- Taking a Chance on Love (1940) – Music by Vernon Duke – Lyrics by John La Touche
- I Know That You Know (1926) – Music by Vincent Youmans – Lyrics by Anne Caldwell
- English Suite No. 2 in A minor (1722) – Music by Johann Sebastian Bach – Performed by Alicia de Larrocha
- Home Cooking – Written by Hilton Ruiz – Performed by The Hilton Ruiz Quartet
- Happy Birthday to You (1893) – Written by Mildred J. Hill & Patty S. Hill
- Sweet Georgia Brown (1925) – Music by Ben Bernie & Maceo Pinkard – Lyrics by Kenneth Casey
- I've Got You (1942) – Music by Jacques Press – Lyrics by Frank Loesser
- This Year's Kisses (1937) – Written by Irving Berlin – Performed by Ozzie Nelson
- All I Do Is Dream of You (1934) – Music by Nacio Herb Brown – Lyrics by Arthur Freed
- String Quartet in G major, Op. 161, D.887, 1st movement(1826) – Music by Franz Schubert – Performed by the Juilliard String Quartet
- Murder He Says (1942) – Music by Jimmy McHugh – Lyrics by Frank Loesser
- Beautiful Love (1931) – Music by Victor Young, Wayne King and Egbert Van Alstyne – Lyrics by Haven Gillespie
- Great Day (1929) – Music by Vincent Youmans – Lyrics by Billy Rose & Edward Eliscu
- Star Eyes (1943) – Music by Gene de Paul – Lyrics by Don Raye – Performed by Lee Musiker
- Because (1902) – Music by Guy d'Hardelot – Lyrics by Edward Teschemacher
- Crazy Rhythm (1928) – Music by Roger Wolfe Kahn & Joseph Meyer – Lyrics by Irving Caesar
- I'll See You Again (1929) – Written by Noël Coward
- Hopak - traditional Ukrainian dance
- Cuban Mambo (1958) – Music by Xavier Cugat & Rafael Angulo – Lyrics by Jack Wiseman
- Polkadots and Moonbeams (1939) – Music by Jimmy Van Heusen – Lyrics by Johnny Burke
- I'll Be Seeing You (1938) – Music by Sammy Fain – Lyrics by Irving Kahal – Performed by Liberace

== Reception ==
=== Box office ===
The film grossed a domestic total of $18,254,702. Woody Allen personally selected Denver for the world premiere of Crimes and Misdemeanors to open the 12th Denver International Film Festival on October 19, 1989. Festival representative Gloria Campbell told the Colorado Springs Gazette Telegraph that Allen chose Denver because of the strength of his following there, noting that Hannah and Her Sisters "had a better run at the Esquire in Denver than anywhere else in the country."

=== Critical response ===
Crimes and Misdemeanors received mostly positive reviews. It holds a 92% rating on review aggregator Rotten Tomatoes, based on 50 critics, with an average rating of 7.9/10. It holds a 77/100 weighted average score on Metacritic, based on 10 critics.

Vincent Canby of The New York Times lauded the film, remarking:

The wonder of Crimes and Misdemeanors is the facility with which Mr. Allen deals with so many interlocking stories of so many differing tones and voices. The film cuts back and forth between parallel incidents and between present and past with the effortlessness of a hip, contemporary Aesop. The movie's secret strength—its structure, really—comes from the truth of the dozens and dozens of particular details through which it arrives at its own very hesitant, not especially comforting, very moving generality."

Roger Ebert of the Chicago Sun-Times gave the film four out of four, writing:

The movie generates the best kind of suspense, because it's not about what will happen to people—it's about what decisions they will reach. We have the same information they have. What would we do? How far would we go to protect our happiness and reputation? How selfish would we be? Is our comfort worth more than another person's life? Allen does not evade this question, and his answer seems to be, yes, for some people, it would be.

Though normally a fierce critic of Allen's work, John Simon of National Review declared the film to be "Allen's first successful blending of drama and comedy, plot and subplot", and added:

The chief strength of the movie is its courage in confronting grave and painful questions of the kind the American cinema has been doing its damnedest to avoid.

Jonathan Rosenbaum of the Chicago Reader dismissed the film, writing:

The overall "philosophical" thrust is designed to make the audience feel very wise, but none of the characters or ideas is allowed to develop beyond its cardboard profile (though Alda has a ball with his part).

Jim Hoberman revisited the film in 2014 for The New York Times, writing:

An agnostic with regard to Mr. Allen when I first reviewed Crimes and Misdemeanors for The Village Voice, I thought I saw “startling intimations of greatness.” Revisiting the movie nearly a quarter-century later, I was struck by the skill with which he pulls off this unlikely amalgam. Crimes and Misdemeanors, remade after a fashion in Mr. Allen’s Match Point (2005) is an ambitious movie, although, according to his current biographer David Evanier (reached by email), Mr. Allen does not rank it among his favorites. It is also discomfiting, not least in Cliff’s cozy relationship with his prepubescent niece, Jenny...Mr. Allen is a complicated man, and, as the world knows, his relationship with Ms. Farrow and their children has proved to be equally so. Crimes and Misdemeanors is his darkest film and, it would now seem, his most personal as well.

=== Accolades ===
The film was nominated for three Academy Awards: Allen for Best Director and Best Original Screenplay, and Martin Landau for Best Actor in a Supporting Role.

In Empire magazine's 2008 poll of "The 500 Greatest Movies of All Time", Crimes and Misdemeanors was ranked number 267. In 2010, it was the first film to win the 20/20 Award for Best Picture, Best Original Screenplay (Allen), and Best Supporting Actor (Landau). It also received three additional nominations, for Best Director (Woody Allen), Best Supporting Actor (Jerry Orbach) and Best Supporting Actress (Huston). In a 2016 Time Out contributors' poll, it ranked second only to Annie Hall among Allen's efforts, with Dave Calhoun praising it as "the film in which Woody's comic and serious sides most comfortably align". The film achieved the same rank in a 2016 article by The Daily Telegraph critics Robbie Collin and Tim Robey, who wrote, "Here [Allen is] thinking deeply about moral choice, the question of whether guilt in your own eyes or the eyes of the world matters more. This bubblingly wise film, rich with beautifully dovetailing metaphors about blindness and conscience and the perils of self-knowledge, [...] is Allen on soaring form, gliding so elegantly through its maze of ideas it's as if the spirit of Fred Astaire gave it lift-off." Crimes and Misdemeanors was also named Allen's second best by Chris Nashawaty of Entertainment Weekly and Barbara VanDenbergh of The Arizona Republic, third by Darian Lusk of CBS News, and fourth by Zachary Wigon of Nerve. In a 2015 BBC critics' poll, it was voted the 57th greatest American film ever made.

In 2006, Writers Guild of America West ranked its screenplay 57th in WGA’s list of 101 Greatest Screenplays. In October 2013, the film was voted by The Guardian readers as the third best film directed by Allen.

Year	Award	Category	Nominated work	Result
1989	Academy Awards	Best Director	Woody Allen	Nominated
1989	Academy Awards	Best Supporting Actor	Martin Landau	Nominated
1989	Academy Awards	Best Original Screenplay	Woody Allen	Nominated
1989	Golden Globe Awards	Best Motion Picture – Drama	Crimes and Misdemeanors	Nominated
1990	British Academy Film Awards	Best Film	Robert Greenhut; Woody Allen	Nominated
1990	British Academy Film Awards	Best Director	Woody Allen	Nominated
1990	British Academy Film Awards	Best Original Screenplay	Woody Allen	Nominated
1990	British Academy Film Awards	Best Supporting Actor	Alan Alda	Nominated
1990	British Academy Film Awards	Best Supporting Actress	Anjelica Huston	Nominated
1990	British Academy Film Awards	Best Film Editing	Susan E. Morse	Nominated
1990	Directors Guild of America Awards	Outstanding Directing - Motion Pictures	Woody Allen	Nominated
1990	Writers Guild of America Awards	Outstanding Original Screenplay	Woody Allen	Won
1989	National Board of Review	Top 10 Films	Crimes and Misdemeanors	Won
1989	National Board of Review	Best Supporting Actor	Alan Alda	Won
1989	New York Film Critics Circle	Best Supporting Actor	Alan Alda	Won
1989	Los Angeles Film Critics Association	Best Supporting Actor	Martin Landau	Nominated

== Release ==
=== Home media ===
Crimes and Misdemeanors was released through MGM Home Entertainment on DVD on June 5, 2001. A limited-edition Blu-ray of 3,000 units was later released by Twilight Time on February 11, 2014.

== Notes ==
- Litch, Mary M. (2010) [1st ed. 2002]. "Existentialism – The Seventh Seal (1957), Crimes and Misdemeanors (1988), and Leaving Las Vegas (1995)". Philosophy Through Film (2nd ed.). London: Taylor & Francis. pp. 209–226. ISBN 978-0-4159-3875-4.
