= Jennifer Johnston (novelist) =

Irish writer (1930–2025)

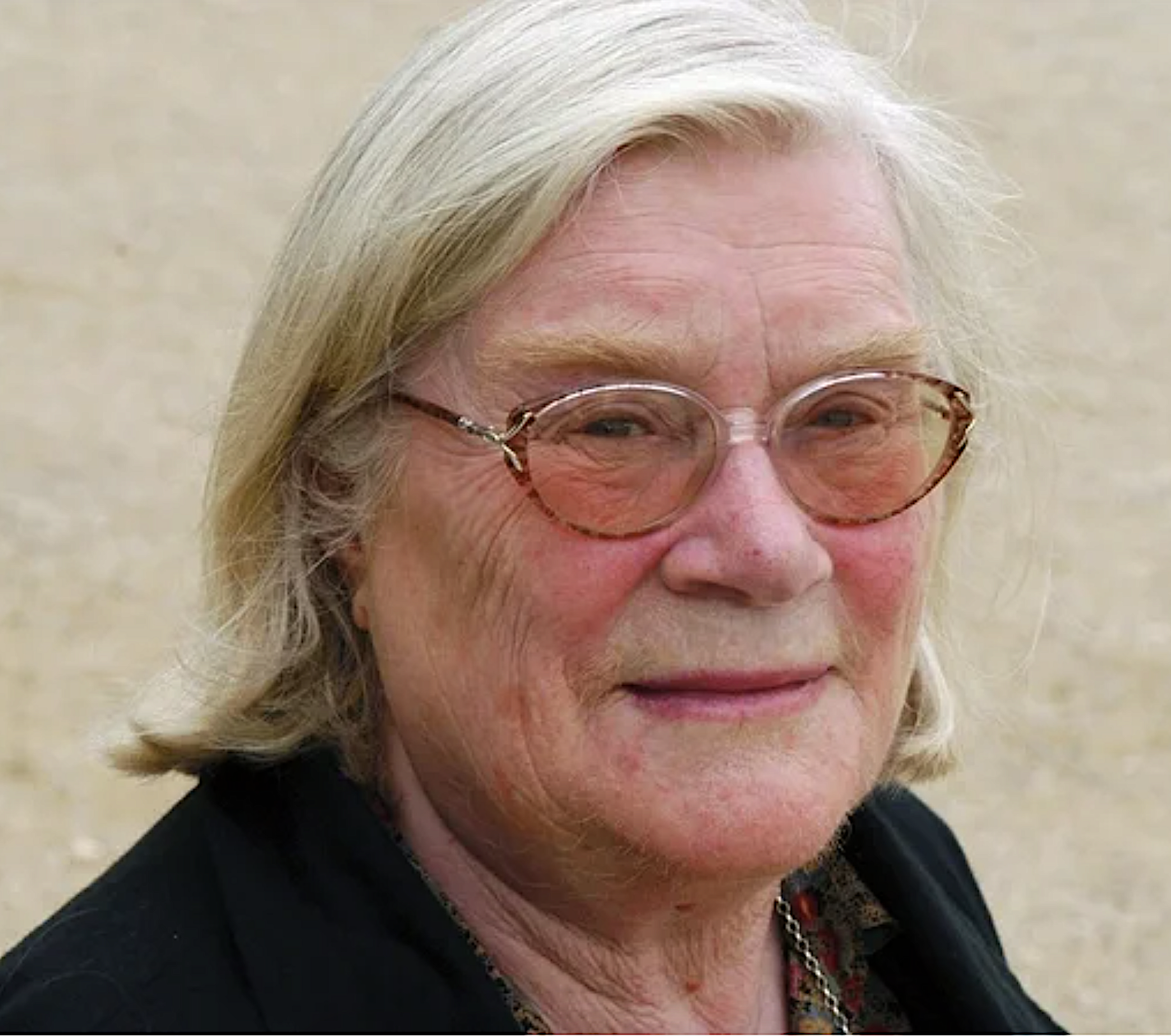
- Born: Jennifer Prudence Johnston; 12 January 1930; Dublin, Ireland
- Died: 25 February 2025 (aged 95); Dún Laoghaire, Ireland
- Education: Trinity College Dublin
- Occupation: Novelist
- Spouse(s): Ian Smyth (m. 1951-?); 4 children David Gilliland (his death)
- Relatives: Shelah Richards (mother); Denis Johnston (father)

Jennifer Prudence Johnston (12 January 1930 – 25 February 2025) was an Irish novelist. She won a number of awards, including the Whitbread Book Award for The Old Jest in 1979 and a Lifetime Achievement from the Irish Book Awards (2012). The Old Jest, a novel about the Irish War of Independence, was later made into a film called The Dawning, starring Anthony Hopkins, produced by Sarah Lawson and directed by Robert Knights.

== Life and career ==
Johnston was born in Dublin on 12 January 1930, to Irish actress and director Shelah Richards and Irish playwright Denis Johnston. A cousin of actress and film star Geraldine Fitzgerald, via Fitzgerald's mother, Edith (née Richards), Jennifer was educated at Trinity College Dublin, graduating in 1965 with a degree in ancient and modern literature. She was born into the Church of Ireland and many of her novels deal with the fading of the Protestant Anglo-Irish ascendancy in the 20th century. She was a member of Aosdána.

== Awards and honours ==
- 1973 Authors' Club First Novel Award for The Captains and the Kings
- 1977 Booker Prize shortlist for Shadows on our Skin
- 1979 Whitbread Book Award for The Old Jest
- 1989 Giles Cooper Awards for O Ananias, Azarias and Misael
- 2001 Honorary Fellow of Trinity College Dublin
- 2006 Irish PEN Award
- 2009 Elected Fellow of the Royal Society of Literature
- 2012 Irish Book Awards Lifetime Achievement Award

== Personal life ==
Johnston was married twice. In 1951 she married a fellow student at Trinity College, Ian Smyth. Their four children are Patrick Smyth, Sarah, Lucy, and Malachy. After marrying her second husband, David Gilliland, she lived in Derry. After being widowed, she moved back to Dublin. Her cousins included the actresses Susan Fitzgerald and Tara Fitzgerald.

Johnston suffered from dementia in later years. She died at a nursing home in Dún Laoghaire, on 25 February 2025, at the age of 95. Among the tributes paid to her was one by Irish President Michael D Higgins who recalled that "throughout her many novels and plays, provided a deep and meaningful examination of the nature and limitations of identity, family and personal connections throughout the tumultuous events of 20th century Irish life".

== List of works ==
Novels

- The Captains and the Kings (1972), winner of the Author's Club First Novel Award
- The Gates (1973)
- How Many Miles to Babylon? (1974)
- Shadows on Our Skin (1977), shortlisted for the Booker Prize
- The Old Jest (1979), winner of a Whitbread Book Award for 1979
- The Christmas Tree (1981)
- The Railway Station Man (1984)
- Fool's Sanctuary. London: Hamilton. 1987. ISBN 978-0-241-12035-4.
- The Invisible Worm (1991)
- The Illusionist (1995)
- Three Monologues: "Twinkletoes", "Mustn't Forget High Noon", "Christine" (1995)
- Finbar's Hotel, edited by Dermot Bolger (1997) (Contributor)
- Two Moons. London: Review. 1998. ISBN 978-0-7472-2136-4.
- The Essential Jennifer Johnston (1999) (contains The Captains and the Kings, The Railway Station Man, and Fool's Sanctuary)
- Great Irish Stories of Murder and Mystery (2000) (Contributor)
- The Gingerbread Woman. London: Review. 2000. ISBN 978-0-7472-2137-1.
- This is not a Novel (2002)
- Grace and Truth (2005)
- Foolish Mortals. London: Headline Review. 2007. ISBN 978-0-7553-3052-2.
- Truth or Fiction. London: Headline Review. 2009. ISBN 978-0-7553-3054-6.
- Shadow Story (2012)
- A Sixpenny Song (2013)
- Naming the Stars (2015)

Plays

- The Nightingale and Not the Lark (1981)
- Andante un Poco Mosso, first performed 1981, published in The Best Short Plays 1983 (1983)
- Indian Summer (1984)
- The Porch (1986)
- The Invisible Man (1987)
- O Ananias, Azarias and Misael (1989)
- Triptych (1989)
- Twinkletoes (1993)
- The Desert Lullaby: A Play in Two Acts. Belfast: Lagan. 1996. ISBN 978-1-873687-26-0.
- Moonlight and Music (2000)
- Waiting (2006)
- The Christmas Tree: A Play in Two Acts (2015)

== See also ==
- List of winners and shortlisted authors of the Booker Prize for Fiction
