= The Man Who Made Husbands Jealous (film) =

- Directed by: Robert Knights
- Screenplay by: Harvey Bamberg; Andrew Maclear
- Based on: The Man Who Made Husbands Jealous by Jilly Cooper
- Produced by: Sarah Lawson
- Starring: Stephen Billington; Kate Byers; Hugh Bonneville; Donna King
- Edited by: Christopher Wentzell
- Music by: John Murphy; David A. Hughes
- Production company: Lawson Productions for Anglia Television
- Distributed by: ITV
- Release date: June 6, 1997
- Running time: 146 minutes
- Country: United Kingdom
- Language: English
- Budget: £3,000,000

The Man Who Made Husbands Jealous is a 1997 British television film based on Jilly Cooper's 1993 book of the same name in the Rutshire Chronicles series, directed by Robert Knights and produced by Sarah Lawson. The title role of Lysander Hawkley is played by Stephen Billington.

With a length of 146 minutes, broadcasters usually divide the production into a serial of three episodes. It is available on DVD.

== Production ==
The producer, Sarah Lawson, had previously worked with the director she hired for the film, Robert Knights, on the feature film The Dawning (1988). Knights had begun his directing career in the 1970s on BBC television's Play for Today and was in the middle of a distinguished career in television drama and film which had already taken in The History Man (1981), Porterhouse Blue (1987), and Double Vision (1992). His work on Porterhouse Blue and The Glittering Prizes (1976) had been nominated for BAFTA Awards.

The casting director did not look for established stars. Stephen Billington, who had the pivotal role of Lysander Hawkley, was almost unknown when he was chosen from the hundreds who auditioned to play the part. Donna King, who played one of Lysander's love interests, had originally been a dancer and had originated the part of Bombalurina in Andrew Lloyd Webber's Cats on Broadway.

The costs of the production were reported in May 1997 as £3,000,000. The publicity pictures portrayed "a smooth young opportunist surrounded by eager women of all ages".

== Outline ==
In the opening scene, Lysander Hawkley (Stephen Billington), accompanied by a Jack Russell Terrier which goes everywhere with him, is caught making love to Martha (Donna King), the neglected wife of Elmer Winterton (Mac McDonald). He runs naked out of the house and through a garden, pursued by the jealous Winterton with a crossbow, and hides in a tree, where he is found and trapped by Rottweilers.

Hawkley is a semi-professional tennis player in his early twenties who is becoming notorious in the gossip columns for affairs with a series of married women. After his mother's funeral, his disapproving father (T. R. Bowen) refuses to give him any more money. When Hawkley then complains to his friend Ferdie (Hugh Bonneville) about the dire state of his debts, they form a plan for Hawkley to take money from neglected wives to make their husbands jealous. This is followed with solid financial success until Hawkley meets Kitty Rannaldini (Kate Byers), the wife of a world-famous conductor. He finds himself out of his depth when he becomes besotted with her.

== Cast ==
- Stephen Billington as Lysander Hawkley
- Hugh Bonneville as Ferdie Fitzgerald
- T. R. Bowen as David Hawkley
- Donna King as Martha Winterton
- Mac McDonald as Elmer Winterton
- Rhona Mitra as Flora Seymour
- Philip Bowen as Guy Seymour
- Gilly Coman as Marigold Lockton
- Nicholas Ball as Larry Lockton
- Kim Criswell as Georgie Maguire
- Ravil Isyanov as Boris Levitsky
- Rosalind Plowright as Hermione Harefield
- Derek de Lint as Roberto Rannaldini
- Kate Byers as Kitty Rannaldini
- Sandra Reinton as Julia
- Nichola Cordey as Nikki
- Stephen Ullathorne as Journalist
- Tim Meats as Priest
- Maureen Bennett as Matron
- Kate Blackham as Waitress
- Fiona Dunn as Waitress
- Joanna Jeffrees as Friend at concert
- Fiona Richmond as extra (uncredited)

== Reception ==
The People commented on the production that only Jilly Cooper could get away with "a preposterous hero with a name that sounds like an RAF Transport plane". It continued:

Looking alarmingly like Superman, newcomer Stephen Billington as Lysander lies under every silken boudoir sheet of the Pimms and champagne set. A wicked wastrel, he's an ex-horseman and tennis pro whose foreplay is more impressive than his forehand – and emerges as the man who put the giggle in gigolo.

In The Independent, David Aaronovitch noted that "Lysander is not predatory, it's just that every woman in the world wants his first service, and what can a guy do?" Aaronovitch went on to compare Hawkley with Peter Mandelson, "The Man Who Makes Politicians Jealous".

In The Daily Mirror, Richard Wallace commented "If Tim Henman thinks the pressure's on as Wimbledon approaches, he ought to try stepping into the tennis shoes of Stephen Billington."

== See also ==
- 1997 in British television
- Riders (1993 film)
