= Sarah Lawson =

Sarah Lawson may refer to:

- Sarah Lawson (actress) (1928–2023), British actress
- Sarah Lawson (producer) (1955–2008), English film producer
