= Barbara Robertson =

American actress and singer

Barbara Robertson is an American actress and singer. She plays the role of "Jan the Unnamed" for the American Theatre Company's Pre-Broadway Chicago production of "Yeast Nation". Recently she played the role of Mame at the Drury Lane Theatre.

She played Madame Morrible in the Chicago production of Wicked. She first played the role from May 8, 2007, through June 25, 2008, and again to close out the production from November 18, 2008, until the final performance on January 25, 2009. She also played a limited engagement with the touring production of the show on its stop in Chicago, which ran from December 1, 2010, through January 23, 2011.

She has also performed in Angels of America: Part I & II, Hamlet, A Little Night Music, Who's Afraid of Virginia Woolf?, Mary Stuart, La Bete, Grand Hotel, The Goat, or Who Is Sylvia?, Garden, Pal Joey, Black Snow, Kabuki Medea, and Emma's Child. She has also appeared in many film and TV productions, including The Company, The Straight Story, Will of Their Own, Disney's Mother's Courage, Paramount's The Untouchables, and Early Edition.

She is a 1972 graduate of Glenbard West High School in Glen Ellyn, Illinois.

== Filmography ==
=== Film ===
| Year | Film | Role |
|---|---|---|
| 1987 | Light of Day | Arguing Woman |
| 1989 | Cold Justice | Nancy |
| 1990 | Shaking the Tree | Nurse |
| 1998 | Stricken | Banyon's Mom |
| 1999 | The Straight Story | Deer Woman |
| 2001 | Soul Survivors | Margaret |
| 2003 | The Company | Harriet |
| 2012 | Adventures in the Sin Bin | Old Woman |

=== Television ===
| Year | Show | Role | Notes |
|---|---|---|---|
| 1989 | A Mother's Courage: The Mary Thomas Story | Miss Day, Receptionist | TV movie |
| 1990 | Goodnight Sweet Wife: A Murder in Boston | Shelley | TV movie |
| 1992 | In the Best Interest of the Children | Angela Bayer | TV movie |
| 1997 | Early Edition | Sally Deluca | 1 Episode |
| 1998 | A Will of Their Own | Maria Jermaine | 1 Episode |
| 2023 | Somebody Somewhere | Darlene | recurring |

=== Short films ===
| Year | Film | Role |
|---|---|---|
| 2007 | Hunter | Anne |
| 2012 | After Christmas | Linda |
| 2014 | The First Men | |
