= The Finest Hour =

- Directed by: Shimon Dotan
- Written by: Shimon Dotan; Stuart Schoffman
- Produced by: Ami Artzi; Menahem Golan; Zvi Spielmann
- Starring: Rob Lowe; Gale Hansen; Tracy Griffith
- Cinematography: Avraham Karpick
- Edited by: Netaya Anbar; Bob Ducsay
- Music by: Walter Christian Rothe
- Distributed by: 21st Century Film Corporation
- Release date: February 1992
- Running time: 105 min
- Country: United States
- Language: English

The Finest Hour (released in the Philippines as Desert Storm: The Final Battle) is a 1992 American war drama film starring Rob Lowe and Gale Hansen as Navy SEALs-in-training who become best friends. When a woman comes between them, however, it takes a war to bring them back together again.

== Plot ==
Lawrence Hammer (Lowe) and Dean Mazzoli (Hansen) are two Naval Officers undergoing the rigorous and demanding Navy BUD/s training program. Both men quest to become Navy SEALs. During the training Hammer is shown as cocky and not a true team player. Mazzoli is a natural leader who is respected by the other trainees. The two men clash over time due to Hammer's attitude making a bad name for everyone. The two men's feud eventually is seen by the training instructors. After being punished in a "military manner", the two become friends. On liberty Mazzoli takes an interest in Barbara, a known love interest and friend of Hammer's. Barbara and Mazzoli share a romantic moment under a capsized canoe but Mazzoli breaks away before anything further happens. He knows that his friend Hammer has been involved with her for a while. Later that night Hammer and Barbara elope and Mazzoli is shocked but accepts the marriage.

The two finish their BUD/s training and Mazzoli informs Hammer that he is completing his SDV training on the East Coast, not the West Coast as Hammer will be doing. A brief confrontation between the two occurs on the beach and subsides when Mazzoli says it is because of Barbara. Soon Iraq invades Kuwait and Hammer is seen on a reconnaissance mission with Bosco, who was Mazzoli's and Hammer's former lead training instructor. After coming under enemy fire Bosco is taken prisoner. Hammer and Mazzoli reunite when Mazzoli comes to aid in the rescue mission of Bosco. While preparing for the mission the two catch up, with Hammer talking about how Barbara and her son Josh both miss seeing him. He further goes on and tells of his infidelities and about Barbara knowing about his unfaithfulness. Hammer and Mazzoli successfully rescue Bosco but Hammer is severely injured during the mission.

While Hammer is hospitalized, Mazzoli picks up Barbara at the airport to bring her to see her husband. The two exchange a level of awkwardness and it is clear they both have feelings for each other. After ensuring that Hammer is all right, Barbara and Hammer began to argue and viewers learn that Hammer slept with Barbara's best friend. While remaining around for Hammer's sake, Barbara is guided around the area by Mazzoli. The two share some alone time together and their romantic feelings come back with each aware of the other's feelings. Barbara informs Mazzoli that she will be leaving Hammer.

The SEAL commanders inform Hammer while in the hospital that they will be sending the SEALs back in to destroy the island facilities where Bosco was being held. The island is a chemical weapons manufacturing base. Hammer intends on participating in the mission but is denied for medical reasons. He falsifies paperwork and is released from the hospital. He attends the briefing for the mission and produces his falsified medical clearance which gains him a spot on the mission roster.

The mission is launched and Mazzoli learns early on that Hammer was not medically fit for diving. He raises his concern that Hammer put the whole team and mission in jeopardy. The mission is successful but the SEALs are discovered and are on the run. They commandeer a boat and plan on blowing up the boat. Hammer ensures he is the last one off the boat, but becomes snagged by netting on his jump off the boat. The boat explodes and Mazzoli is seen searching the water for his friend. He finds Hammer and Hammer tells him "I'm dying," to which Mazzoli responds "You're always dying." Following the SEALs' rescue by submarine, Hammer goes into cardiac arrest. Upon the ship's return to the docks, Barbara is seen waiting and smiles when she sees Mazzoli. The smile turns to grief when she sees a saddened Mazzoli and other SEALs carrying a military body bag containing Hammer's corpse off the ship. The movie ends with Mazzoli coming back into narration, saying that when Barbara and he both lost Hammer, they lost themselves as well, meaning they did not pursue a relationship.

== Cast ==
- Rob Lowe as Lawrence Hammer
- Gale Hansen as Dean Mazzoli
- Tracy Griffith as Barbara
- Eb Lottimer as Bosco
- Baruch Dror as Greenspan
- Daniel Dieker as Albie
- Michael Fountain as Carter
- Uri Gavriel as Enemy Commander

== Release ==
The Finest Hour was released direct-to-video in the United States in February 1992. In the Philippines, the film was theatrically released as Desert Storm: The Final Battle in March 1992.

== See also ==
- List of films featuring the United States Navy SEALs
