= Joanna Jeffrees =

English actress

- Born: Joanna Clark; Winchester, Hampshire, England, UK
- Occupation: Actress
- Years active: 1996 - present

Joanna Jeffrees is an English actress. She was born in Winchester, Hampshire. She is notable for her work in television, including the British TV series The Ruth Rendell Mysteries. Jeffrees can be seen playing the role of Kirsty in the Channel 5 TV reconstruction documentary drama 'Fingers in the Till', made by Silver River Productions, directed by Sam Wildman.

== Life ==
Jeffrees had her first London acting agent at fourteen, Movie Mites, and whilst with them auditioned for a role in the Stanley Kubrick film Eyes Wide Shut. By the age of sixteen Jeffrees had played a variety of minor TV roles, including being the invited guest on the Cable TV Series 'Cash In Hand'. Jeffrees then went on to play Ellen Malpass alongside Janet Suzman, Joyce Redman, Edward Hardwicke and Richard Johnson in the Ruth Rendell Mystery 'Front Seat', directed by Sandy Johnson for Meridan and ITV Productions. Jeffrees played the female job candidate in an episode of the British comedy TV series Peep Show, and as one of the regular daily commuters in the two part BBC TV drama 'The 7:39', starring Sheridan Smith and David Morrissey.

Jeffrees filmed the role of the Nursemaid in The Suspicions of Mr Whicher- The murder in Angel lane', alongside Olivia Colman and Paddy Considine, directed by Christopher Menaul for Hat Trick Productions and ITV.

Jeffrees studied Performing Arts at Fareham College in Hampshire and whilst there she received distinction in her Lamda Acting Medals and certificates. Jeffrees then went on to train at the Academy of Live and Recorded Arts in London.

== Career ==
- Pride and Prejudice and Zombies - Feature Film - Victorian Dancer
- Nurse - BBC Two - Woman
- Harry & Paul's Story of the Two's (2014) BBC 2 - Great British Bake Off Baker
- Critical - (2014) Sky 1 - C T Scanner Technician (Recurring role)
- Fingers in the Till - (2014) - Silver River Productions/Channel 5 - Plays the main character in the story, Kirsty
- Flack - (2013) - Channel 4 - Chemist Customer
- The 7.39 - (2013) - Carnival Films/BBC - Regular Daily Commuter
- The Suspicions of Mr Whicher - The Murder In Angel Lane - (2013) - ITV Productions - Nursemaid
- Chickens - (2013) - Big Talk Productions/Sky 1 - Irate Village Woman at Parish Meeting
- Law & Order: UK - (2013) - Kudos Film &Television - Press Officer
- The World's End (2013) Feature Film - Blank dancer at school reunion disco
- Peep Show (2012) Channel 4 - Female Job Candidate at the Bathroom Shop
- Holby City (2012) BBC TV - Private Secretary
- Misfits (2012) Clerkenwell Films/Channel 4 TV - Guest at Wake
- Cuban Fury (2013) Feature Film - Girl at Bowling Alley
- Skyfall (2012) Feature Film - Whitehall Commuter
- Barclaycard Photobooth Advert (2012) - TV Advert - Woman by Photobooth
- Sparks and Embers (2012) Feature Film - Pub Customer
- StreetDance 2 3D (2012) - Dance off Spectator
- The Paris Experience (2009) - Olivia
- Always Left Wondering (2005) - Mum
- Ushers (2003) - Jo
- Front Seat The Ruth Rendell Mysteries - Ellen Malpass
- The Ruth Rendell Mysteries (TV series) (1993-1998) - Various
- Killer Net (1998) - Girl on seafront
- The Woodlanders (1997) - Peasant Girl
- The Man Who Made Husbands Jealous (1997) - Friend at concert
