= Brenda Fricker =

Irish actress (1945–2026)

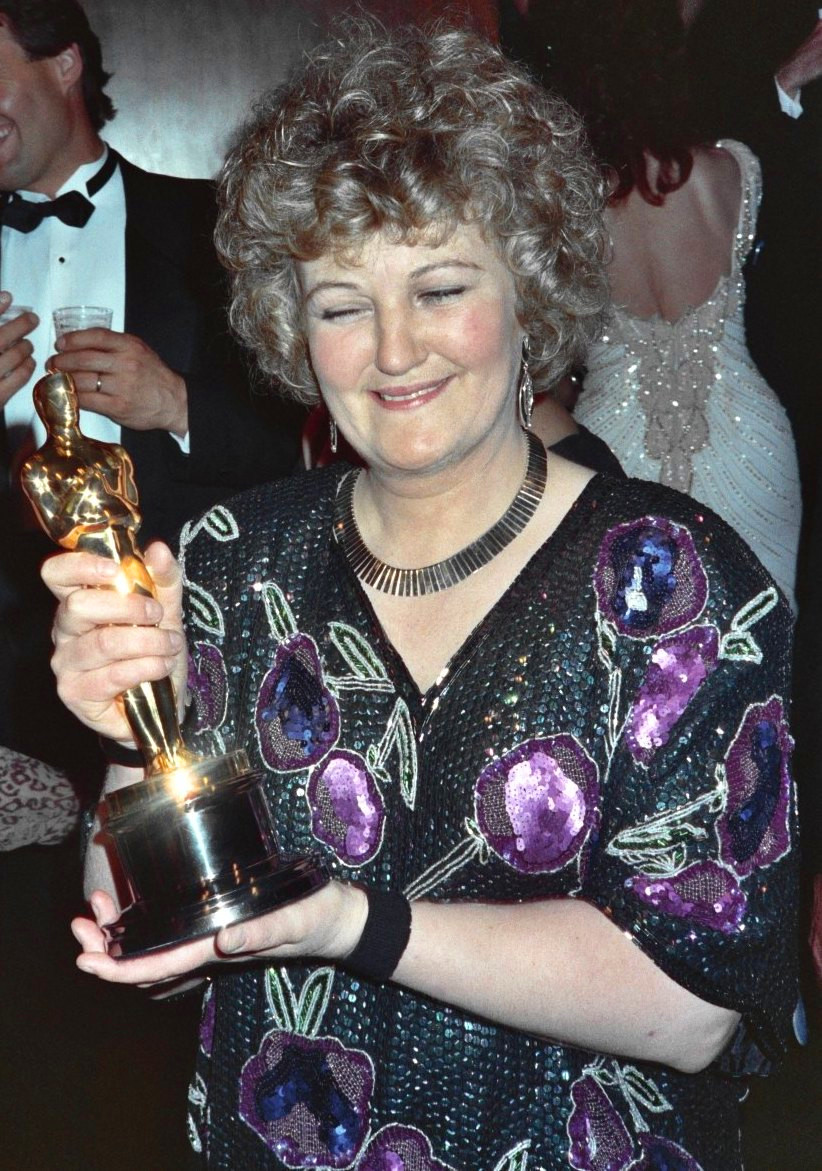
- Fricker at the 62nd Academy Awards in 1990
- Born: 17 February 1945; Dublin, Ireland
- Died: 16 July 2026 (aged 81); Dublin, Ireland
- Occupation: Actress
- Years active: 1964–2024
- Spouse: Barry Davis (m. 1979; sep. 1988)

Brenda Fricker (17 February 1945 – 16 July 2026) was an Irish actress whose career spanned six decades on stage and screen. She appeared in more than 30 films and television productions. In 1990, Fricker became the first Irish actress to win an Academy Award, earning the award for Best Supporting Actress for the biopic My Left Foot (1989). She also appeared in films such as The Field (1990), Home Alone 2: Lost in New York (1992), So I Married an Axe Murderer (1993), Angels in the Outfield (1994), A Time to Kill (1996), Veronica Guerin (2003), Inside I'm Dancing (2004), and Albert Nobbs (2011).

Fricker was honoured with the inaugural Maureen O'Hara Award at the Kerry Film Festival in 2008. In 2020, The Irish Times ranked her 26th on its list of the greatest Irish film actors of all time.

== Early life ==
Brenda Fricker was born on 17 February 1945 in Dublin, Ireland. Her mother "Bina" (née Murphy) was from Gneeveguilla, County Kerry. Bina taught languages at Stratford College in Rathgar, and Fricker's father, Desmond Frederick Fricker, worked in the Department of Agriculture, and as "Fred Desmond", was a broadcaster with RTÉ and a journalist for The Irish Times.

Before becoming an actress, Fricker was an assistant to the art editor of The Irish Times, with hopes of becoming a reporter. She became an actress "by chance". Fricker's feature-film career began with a small, uncredited part in the 1964 film Of Human Bondage, based on W. Somerset Maugham's 1915 novel. She also appeared in Tolka Row, Ireland's first soap opera.

== Career ==
One of Fricker's first television roles was staff nurse Maloney in Coronation Street. She came to wider public attention in the United Kingdom in another nursing role, as Megan Roach in the BBC One drama series Casualty.

Fricker achieved international acclaim after winning the Academy Award for Best Supporting Actress in 1990 for her performance as Christy Brown's mother in My Left Foot (1989). In her acceptance speech, Fricker thanked Brown "just for being alive" and dedicated the Oscar to Brown's mother, saying that "anybody who gives birth 22 times deserves one of these". For her performance, Fricker was also nominated for a Golden Globe, and she won the Los Angeles Film Critics Association Award for Best Supporting Actress. She rejoined My Left Foot writer and director Jim Sheridan for The Field (1990), starring alongside Richard Harris as Maggie McCabe, the wife of Harris's "Bull" McCabe. Fricker continued her television work during this period, appearing in the Australian-produced short series Brides of Christ (1991) and the miniseries Seekers (1992), produced by Sarah Lawson and co-starring Josette Simon.

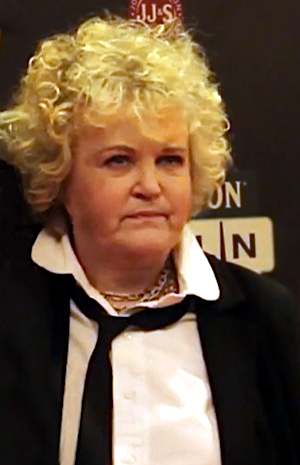
Fricker at the 2014 Dublin Film Festival

Buoyed by her Oscar win, Fricker went on to appear in several high-profile Hollywood films, most notably Home Alone 2: Lost in New York (1992) as the Central Park Pigeon Lady. In 1993, she portrayed May Mackenzie, the Weekly World News-obsessed Scottish mother of Mike Myers's Charlie Mackenzie, in So I Married an Axe Murderer. The following year, Fricker played Maggie, the motherly caretaker of Joseph Gordon-Levitt's character, in the family comedy Angels in the Outfield. One of her final Hollywood roles was Ethel Twitty in A Time to Kill (1996), after which Fricker focused mainly on film and television work in Canada, Ireland, and the United Kingdom. In 2003, she played Bernie Guerin, mother of Veronica Guerin (portrayed by Cate Blanchett) in the film of the same name. Fricker then appeared as nurse Eileen in Inside I'm Dancing (2004). Her other notable roles include Nuala O'Loan in Omagh (2004), Gráinne McFadden in the docudrama No Tears about women infected with hepatitis C through the Anti-D blood product in the 1970s, Aunt Maeve in Durango (1999), and Heather Nightingale in How About You (2007), based on a short story by Maeve Binchy.

Fricker appeared in Closing the Ring, Richard Attenborough's post-World War II drama, also starring Shirley MacLaine, Christopher Plummer, and Mischa Barton. She played half of a lesbian couple alongside Olympia Dukakis in Cloudburst (2011). In 2012, Fricker's supporting role in Albert Nobbs earned her an Irish Film and Television Award nomination.

In 2021, Fricker joined the cast of the TV adaptation of Holding, based on the novel by Graham Norton, marking her first major onscreen role in six years. Three years later, Fricker starred in experimental documentarian Tadhg O'Sullivan's first fiction drama, The Swallow, giving a solitary performance as an unnamed elderly woman reflecting on her life.

== Personal life and death ==
Fricker was married to Barry Davis from 1979 until they separated nine years later. She was pregnant six times during the marriage, but each pregnancy ended in miscarriage. Davis, who struggled with alcoholism, died in 1990. On The Tommy Tiernan Show in 2021, Fricker said that she had battled severe depression for much of her life, including being hospitalised many times.

Fricker said that her loves included her pet dogs, drinking Guinness, reading poetry, and playing snooker – she once remarked that she had taken on the entire crew of My Left Foot: "I played pool against 17 of them, and beat them all!" In 2012, Fricker said "Of all the films I've made, only three do I remember where I felt I'd moved forward as an actress: Cloudburst, My Left Foot, and The Field."

In her 2025 memoir She Died Young: A Life in Fragments, Fricker wrote that she was physically abused by her mother and sexually abused by a teacher when she was eight. At age 14, Fricker spent two years in hospital after going through a car windscreen in a cycling accident, later developed tuberculosis, and made repeated suicide attempts that led to periods in psychiatric care. She said that she was raped at age 17 and described another assault early in her career. Fricker also wrote that she began self-harming before age 10, influenced by religious imagery she saw in church.

Fricker died in Dublin on 16 July 2026, aged 81, after a period of ill health. Her funeral took place on 6 August at St Catherine's Church on Meath Street, followed by a private burial. Attendees included actor Brendan Gleeson, musician Frankie Gavin, and broadcaster Ray D'Arcy.

== Awards and recognition ==
In 2020, The Irish Times ranked Fricker 26th on its list of the 50 greatest Irish film actors of all time.

Year	Organisation	Category	Nominated Work	Result	Ref.
1989	Boston Society of Film Critics	Best Supporting Actress	My Left Foot	Won	
1989	Los Angeles Film Critics Association	Best Supporting Actress	My Left Foot	Won	
1990	Academy Awards	Best Supporting Actress	My Left Foot	Won	
1990	Golden Globe Awards	Best Supporting Actress – Motion Picture	My Left Foot	Nominated	
2003	Irish Film and Television Awards	Best Supporting Actress – Film	Veronica Guerin	Nominated	
2004	Irish Film and Television Awards	Best Lead Actress – Film	Inside I'm Dancing	Nominated	
2008	Kerry International Film Festival	Maureen O'Hara Award	—N/a	Honoured	
2012	Irish Film and Television Awards	Best Supporting Actress – Film	Albert Nobbs	Nominated	
2026	Dublin City Council	Freedom of the City of Dublin	—N/a	Honoured	

== Filmography ==
Year	Title	Role	Notes	Ref.
1964	Of Human Bondage		Uncredited	
1969	Sinful Davey		Uncredited	
1975	Upstairs, Downstairs		Uncredited (extra)	
1976	Play for Today	Molly	1 episode Your Man From Six Counties	
1977	Coronation Street	Staff Nurse Maloney	4 episode arc	
1978–1979	The Quatermass Conclusion	Alison Thorpe	Television series	
1979	The Music Machine	Mrs Pearson		
1980	Bloody Kids	Nurse		
1982	The Ballroom of Romance	Bridie		
1984	Cockles	Ms Kyte	Television series	
1985	The Woman Who Married Clark Gable	Mary		
1986–1990; 1998; 2007; 2010	Casualty	Megan Roach	Television series	
1989	My Left Foot	Bridget Fagan Brown		
1990	The Field	Maggie McCabe		
1991	Brides of Christ	Sister Agnes		
1992	The Sound and the Silence	Eliza	Television series	
1992	Utz	Marta		
1992	Seekers	Stella Hazard	Television series	
1992	Home Alone 2: Lost in New York	Central Park Pigeon Woman		
1993	So I Married an Axe Murderer	May Mackenzie		
1993	Deadly Advice	Iris Greenwood		
1994	A Man of No Importance	Lily Byrne		
1994	Angels in the Outfield	Maggie Nelson		
1995	Journey	Lottie	Television film	
1995	A Woman of Independent Means	Mother Steed	Television mini-series	
1996	Moll Flanders	Mrs. Mazzawatti		
1996	A Time to Kill	Ethel Twitty		
1996	Swann	Rose Hindmarch		
1997	Masterminds	Principal Claire Maloney		
1998	Painted Angels	Annie Ryan		
1998	Resurrection Man	Dorcas Kelly		
1998	Pete's Meteor	Lily		
1998	The American	Mrs. Bread		
1999	Resurrection	Clare's mother	Television remake of 1980 original	
1999	Durango	Aunt Maeve		
2000	Cupid & Cate	Willie Hendley		
2001	The War Bride	Betty		
2002	The Intended	Mrs Jones		
2003	Conspiracy of Silence	Annie McLaughlin		
2003	Veronica Guerin	Bernadette "Bernie" Guerin		
2003	Watermelon	Teresa Ryan		
2004	Trauma	Petra		
2004	Omagh	Police Ombudsman Nuala O'Loan	Television film	
2004	Call Me: The Rise and Fall of Heidi Fleiss	Madame Alex	Television film	
2004	Inside I'm Dancing	Eileen		
2004	Razor Fish	Molly		
2005	Milk	Nan		
2005	Tara Road	Mona		
2007	How About You			
2007	Closing the Ring	Grandma Reilly		
2008	Stone of Destiny	Mrs. McQuarry		
2008	Beautiful People	Narg	Episode: "How I Got My Beads"	
2010	Locked In	Joan		
2011	Cloudburst	Dot		
2011	Albert Nobbs	Polly		
2013	A Long Way from Home	Brenda		
2013	Forgive Me	Mrs. Smith	3 episodes	
2014	Deadly	Bridie	Short	
2021	Cam Boy	Tilda	Episode: "Take My Webcam Virginity"	
2022	Holding	Lizzie Meany		
2023	The Catch	Phyllis Doyle	All 4 episodes	
2023	The Miracle Club	Voice of Maureen		
2024	The Swallow	Unnamed protagonist		

== Selected theatre work ==
- At the Royal National Theatre
  - The Plough and the Stars
  - Lavender Blue
- At the Royal Court Theatre
  - Within Two Shadows
  - A Pagan's Place
- At the Geffen Playhouse
  - Cat on a Hot Tin Roof
- Other
  - Typhad Mary
  - Macbeth
  - Outskirts
  - TV Times
  - The Accrington Pals
  - The Irish Play
  - Lost World
  - The Weeping of Angels

== See also ==
- List of Irish actors
- List of actors with Academy Award nominations
- List of Academy Award winners and nominees from Ireland
- List of people on the postage stamps of Ireland
