= Pete's Meteor =

- DVD cover
- Directed by: Joe O'Byrne
- Written by: Joe O'Byrne
- Produced by: John S. Lyons; Liam O'Neill
- Starring: Brenda Fricker; Alfred Molina; Mike Myers
- Cinematography: Paul Sarossy
- Edited by: Marie-Thérèse Boiché
- Music by: Richard Hartley
- Distributed by: KC Medien
- Release date: 1998
- Running time: 104 minutes
- Country: Ireland
- Language: English

Pete's Meteor is an Irish 1998 drama film. It was written and directed by Joe O'Byrne and stars Mike Myers.

Mike Myers plays a drug dealer living in the slums of Dublin. He tries to financially provide for the three children of his dead brother. The children's lives are forever changed when a meteor crashes into their backyard. Alfred Molina plays a wealthy scientist that the children must confront to retrieve their heaven-sent gift.

== Production and Release ==
The Irish Film Board gave the filmmakers almost IR£300,000 for the production.

It won the Crystal Bear Special Mention award for Best Feature Film at the 1999 Berlin International Film Festival. Despite this, the film failed to find a distributor, and was released direct-to-video in the United States in December 2002.

In a 2002 profile of Myers in The Independent, the film was said to have "proved meteoric in the way it vanished from view".

== Reception ==
Christopher Null of Contactmusic.com awarded the film two stars out of five and wrote, “The story doesn't help matters, and sheer insanity is not much of a substitute for actual character development.”

Nathan Rabin of The Dissolve gave the film a negative review and wrote, “It doesn’t help that the child actors deliver performances so terrible, they may actually persuade audiences to root against a trio of hard-luck orphans.” Rabin also added, “I recommend Pete’s Meteor to bad-movie aficionados.”
