= Donna King =

American dancer, actress and musical theatre performer

- Born: 1957 (age 68–69); Kansas City, Missouri , U.S.
- Occupations: Dancer; singer; actress; teacher
- Years active: 1977–present
- Spouse: John Napier (m. 1984–1994)
- Children: Jimmy Napes, Jessica Napier

Donna King (born 1957) is an American dancer and musical theatre performer who appeared in Broadway musicals in the 1970s and 1980s and has lived and worked mostly in England since the 1980s.

She is also an actress and has appeared in theatre as well as on film and television.

== Life ==
Originally from Kansas City, King trained at the Miller Marley School of Dance in Overland Park, Kansas. She worked briefly on a revue in Las Vegas before starting at Studio 54, New York City, on its opening night in 1977. She appeared in the Broadway musical The Best Little Whorehouse in Texas (1978), then in Roland Petit's 1981 revival of Can-Can, before originating the part of Bombalurina at the Winter Garden Theatre on Broadway in Andrew Lloyd Webber's Cats, which she played from 1982 to 1984. In September 1982, the New York Magazine ran a feature on King, who was pictured as Bombalurina in a window display at Bergdorf Goodman. She played a Shark in the Mediterranean Tour of West Side Story. She was also a lead dancer in the film Grease 2 (1982).

In 1984, King married John Napier, a British theatre designer who had designed the set and costumes for Cats, and they had two children, James (now the musician Jimmy Napes) and Jessica. They were divorced in 1994.

In 1991, Donna King appeared in the lead role of May in a revival of Sam Shepard's Fool for Love at the Timber Street Studios, London.

King had a notable part in Jilly Cooper's The Man Who Made Husbands Jealous (1997). In the opening scene, her tryst with the anti-hero, Lysander Hawkley, is interrupted by her husband, who chases Lysander out of the house naked with a crossbow.

She now has a studio in Camden Town and teaches music, theatre, and film students.

== Musical theatre ==
- The Best Little Whorehouse in Texas (46th Street Theatre, 1978), as Linda Lou
- Can-Can (Minskoff Theatre, Broadway, 1981), as Mimi
- Cats (Winter Garden Theatre, Broadway, 1982–1984), as Bombalurina

== Films ==
This list is not complete

Papaya69 (2022) as Amanda (Papaya's mother) Pic Films, Italy

- Grease 2 (1982) as Girl Greaser (lead dancer)
- The Man Who Made Husbands Jealous (1997) as Martha Winterton
