= Baldi (radio series) =

Radio mystery drama series

- A promotional shot of the cast of Baldi
- Genre: Crime drama
- Running time: 45 minutes
- Country of origin: Northern Ireland
- Language: English
- Home station: BBC Radio 4
- Starring: David Threlfall; Tina Kellegher (series 1–4); Tara Flynn (series 5)
- Created by: Barry Devlin
- Written by: multiple writers
- Produced by: Lawrence Jackson
- Recording studio: RTÉ studios, Dublin
- Original release: 1 October 2000 – 9 December 2010
- No. of series: 5
- No. of episodes: 28
- Opening theme: Saint Agnes and the Burning Train, The Soul Cages

Baldi is a murder mystery series first broadcast on the UK radio station BBC Radio 4. The central character is Paolo Baldi (played by David Threlfall), a Franciscan priest on sabbatical, lecturing on semiotics at a university in contemporary Dublin. After helping the police as a translator for an Italian witness, he turns sleuth. Created by Barry Devlin, it was produced by BBC Northern Ireland. Series 1 began broadcasting in 2000, while series 5 concluded at the end of 2010.

== Summary ==
Father Paolo Baldi (David Threlfall) is a priest torn between his interest in investigation and detective work, and the secluded life of a priest. On sabbatical from the Franciscan Order, he takes up amateur sleuthing and befriends DI Tina Mahon (Tina Kellegher for the first four series, then Tara Flynn), a member of the Gardaí. Both her superior, DS Rynne (Owen Roe), and Baldi's spiritual director, Father Troy (T. P. McKenna), would prefer that he end his sabbatical and return to the Order. Father Baldi has an unfortunate knack of becoming involved in murder enquiries, usually by his friendship with one of those involved. His gentle, reassuring behaviour and the Seal of the Confessional encourages participants to open up to him.

== Broadcasting ==
Five series have been broadcast, totalling twenty-eight episodes. These have all been first aired in the 45 minute Afternoon Play slot, with frequent repeats of the series on BBC Radio 4 Extra. The regular cast included David Threlfall, Tina Kellegher, Owen Roe and T. P. McKenna. Guest appearances have included some of Ireland's and the UK's leading actors, including Gerard McSorley, Martin Clunes, Stephen Mangan, Margaret D'Arcy, Niall Buggy, Adrian Dunbar, Michael Maloney, Bill Nighy, Sorcha Cusack, Geraldine James, Niall Toibin, Barry McGovern, Nick Dunning, David Kelly, Stephen Moore, Pauline McLynn, Sara Kestelman, Robert Bathurst, John Kavanagh, Mark Lambert and Victoria Smurfit.

The theme tune is by Sting, and is titled "Saint Agnes and the Burning Train".

== Episodes ==
Series	Episode	Title	Writer	Summary
1	1	The Prodigal Son	Barry Devlin	Paolo Baldi, Franciscan priest and philosophy lecturer, accidentally becomes involved in solving a murder at an Italian chip shop.
1	2	Keepers of the Flame	Simon Brett	Baldi is caught up in solving the murder of a leading academic. He follows a trail leading into the past of one of Ireland's most cherished literary figures
1	3	Miss Lonelyhearts	Barry Devlin	Paolo and Tina investigate the mysterious circumstances surrounding the death of a nurse at an old people's home and uncover an unlikely case of voyeurism.
1	4	The Emerald Style	Simon Brett	Paolo's attempt to wine and dine his spiritual director Father Troy at a leading Dublin hotel is interrupted by a murder.
1	5	Death Cap	Simon Brett	At a monastic retreat far out in County Cork, a sudden death among the Franciscan brothers causes Paolo to suspect foul play.
1	6	Devil Take the Hindmost	Annie Caulfield	Paolo and Tina investigate the death of a student on campus, following the trail to an arrogant clique that dabbled in the occult. Is there a rational explanation, or was the Devil really involved?
2	7	Three in One	Simon Brett	A trip to the races for Baldi and Mrs Reid proves to have an unexpected link with a contract killing on the mean streets of Dublin's Northside.
2	8	Twilight of a God	Mark Holloway	Paolo and Tina investigate a murder at a celebrity wedding between a country girl and a world-famous opera conductor, in a remote castle off the Irish coast.
2	9	Schecter's Knot	Martin Meenan	The death of a talented young maths professor leaves Paolo and Tina to ask whether it was the result of a bad case of professional jealousy.
2	10	Not for Life	Simon Brett	When told that there is a question mark over the facts surrounding a girl's suicide, Paolo follows the trail into the contrasting worlds of romantic poetry and internet scams.
2	11	Scratching the Surface	Martin Meenan	Paolo and Tina go pot-holing in County Clare and investigate a case of betrayal among a close-knit band of cavers.
2	12	Early Retirement	Mark Holloway	The murder of a high-ranking officer in the Dublin police force causes Tina to reassess her relationship with a beloved father figure.
3	13	Tempus Fugit	Martin Meenan	Baldi finds time waits for no man as he investigates a murder. Mrs Reid leads Paolo and his broken watch to a house of clocks where love, revenge and jealousy make a mockery of time.
3	14	The Book Case	Simon Brett	Paolo helps a librarian investigate the link between her young lover's death, a shifty Chicago cop, and an illegal trade in rare books.
3	15	Sick Rose	Martin Meenan	Paolo and Tina discover that a priceless hybrid plant leads to little peace and serenity in the newly designed Garden of Contemplation.
3	16	Settling Scores	Mark Holloway	Paolo invites Tina to her first classical music concert, and finds a murder gets things off on a wrong note.
3	17	The Dig	Martin Meenan	An archaeological dig becomes a battlefield involving monks, politicians and developers. Paolo makes some fascinating discoveries.
3	18	Far Pavilions	Martin Meenan	Paolo discovers that Irish cricket and fair play are not synonymous when he uncovers foul play at an unfriendly charity match.
4	19	Cross Purposes	Simon Brett	Paolo solves crossword-related murders in Dublin literary circles, with Father Troy proving a surprisingly adept ally.
4	20	The Devil's Eye	Bill Murphy	Paolo is confronted with old Gaelic, shipwrecks and a community's mysterious history on a remote island off the Atlantic coast.
4	21	The Smoker	Andrew Martin	Paolo solves the murder of a politically incorrect, larger-than-life individual in the world of Dublin's pubs and publishing.
4	22	No Sin	Martin Meenan	A death at the local gym leads Paolo to make a connection between the fanatical pursuit of health and mediaeval theology.
4	23	The Empty Vessel	John Murphy	The suspicious death of the leader of the university debating society leads Paolo to investigate the dead youth's close-knit group of friends.
4	24	Shelter	Francis Turnly	The murder of a homeless man leads Paolo to link a Dublin squat with the history of art.
5	25	The Million Dollar Question	Barry Devlin	Franciscan priest Paolo Baldi investigates the mysterious deaths of members of a rockabilly band, exploring patterns of squares and triangles to find the solution.
5	26	A Very Neglected Fish	John Murphy	BaIdi investigates a murder set among the competitive world of celebrity chefs.
5	27	A Green Murder	Andrew Martin	Baldi investigates a murder among a community of Dublin environmentalists.
5	28	Food of the Blue	James McAleavey	When Baldi goes on retreat at Cranolly House, a series of unusual events plunges him into a world of ancient traditions struggling to survive in a modern world.

== Technical crew ==
- Executive Producer – Sarah Lawson
- Producer/Director – Lawrence Jackson, also Mark Lambert for some episodes
- Writers have included:
  - Simon Brett
  - Bill Murphy
  - Andrew Martin
  - Martin Meenan
  - John Murphy
  - Francis Turnly
