= Class of '96 =

- Genre: Drama
- Created by: John Romano
- Written by: Rachel Cline; Evan Katz; John Romano; Melissa Rosenberg; Gardner Stern
- Directed by: Menachem Binetski; Helaine Head; Peter Horton; Tom Moore; Bethany Rooney
- Starring: Jason Gedrick; Lisa Dean Ryan; Megan Ward; Brandon Douglas; Perry Moore; Kari Wührer; Gale Hansen
- Composer: Greg De Belles
- Country of origin: United States
- Original language: English
- No. of seasons: 1
- No. of episodes: 17

Production
- Executive producer: Leonard Goldberg
- Producer: Matt Nodella
- Production locations: Toronto, Ontario, Canada
- Cinematography: Scott Lloyd-Davies; Stephen Ramsey; Sandi Sissel
- Editors: Victor Du Bois; Augie Hess; Lance Luckey
- Running time: 45 minutes
- Production companies: ABC Productions; Mandy Films

Original release
- Network: Fox
- Release: January 19 – May 25, 1993

Class of '96 is an American drama television series that aired on Fox from January to May 1993. The series was created by John Romano and was filmed mostly at the University of Toronto.

== Synopsis ==
The series focuses on seven students at Havenhurst College in New England. Although the seven come from different backgrounds, circumstance leads them to become friends. The series deals with the differences among a group of friends, both in personality and social status, and the challenges they face in their first year of college including social issues such as racism and sexism.

== Cast and characters ==
=== Main ===
- Jason Gedrick as David Morrissey, a passionate writer from New Jersey
- Lisa Dean Ryan as Jessica Cohen, a wealthy Jewish student who falls for David
- Megan Ward as Patty Horvath, Jessica's roommate, the daughter of a famous actress
- Brandon Douglas as Whitney Reed, a rich kid who is being trained to follow in his father's footsteps, including living in his father's old college room
- Perry Moore as Antonio Hopkins, Whitney's roommate, an African-American star basketball player from the inner city
- Kari Wührer as Robin Farr, Jessica and Patty's roommate, an attractive girl from Florida
- Gale Hansen as Samuel "Stroke" Dexter, David's roommate, an entrepreneur

=== Guest stars ===
Guest stars throughout the series run include Gillian Anderson, John Cameron Mitchell, Matt LeBlanc, Julie Bowen, Robin Tunney, Dylan Neal, Elizabeth Dennehy, James LeGros, Fritz Weaver, Reed Diamond, Karyn Dwyer, Mason Adams and Ele Keats. Director and series consultant Peter Horton also made a cameo in one episode as a professor; he was previously known for playing a professor on thirtysomething.

== Reception and cancellation ==
The pilot episode aired on January 19, 1993 with ratings falling steadily after the premiere due to competition from Full House and Hangin' with Mr. Cooper on ABC and Rescue 911 on CBS, all of which ranked in the Top 20 that season. The series was cancelled and finished airing its 17-episode order on May 25.

== Episodes ==
No.	Title	Original release date
1	"Pilot"	January 19, 1993
2	"They Shoot Baskets, Don't They?"	January 26, 1993
3	"Breaking up is Hard to Overdue"	February 2, 1993
4	"Midterm Madness"	February 9, 1993
5	"Look Homeward Angela"	February 16, 1993
6	"The Adventures of Pat's Man and Robin"	February 23, 1993
7	"David is Authorized"	March 2, 1993
8	"The Accused"	March 9, 1993
9	"When Whitney Met Linda"	March 16, 1993
10	"Parents Weekend"	March 23, 1993
11	"The Best Little Frat House at Havenhurst"	March 30, 1993
12	"Bright Smoke, Cold Fire"	April 6, 1993
13	"Greenwich Mean Time"	April 20, 1993
14	"Educating David"	April 27, 1993
15	"Howie Farr is Too Far"	May 4, 1993
16	"The Jessica File"	May 11, 1993
17	"See You in September"	May 25, 1993
