= The Estate (2012 TV series) =

Television series

- Genre: Documentary
- Narrated by: Adrian Dunbar
- Countries of origin: Northern Ireland; United Kingdom
- Original language: English
- No. of episodes: 8

Production
- Executive producers: Doug Carnegie; Paul McGuigan
- Production location: Coleraine
- Running time: 30 minutes per episode (approx.)

Original release
- Network: BBC One Northern Ireland
- Release: 23 January – 12 March 2012

The Estate is a BBC Northern Ireland documentary series similar to The Scheme, this time following the lives of several families in the Ballysally housing estate in Coleraine. The series was broadcast every Monday at 10:35pm from 23 January 2012 to 12 March 2012 on BBC One Northern Ireland and was broadcast to the rest of the UK every Tuesday at 11:35pm, 27 March – 15 May 2012 on BBC One and BBC One HD (2nd episode broadcast on a Monday, 3rd, 4th & 5th episodes at 11:40pm & 6th episode at 11:50pm).

== Episodes ==
The episodes were transmitted at the following times:

Episode	BBC One NI transmission date/time	BBC One (rest of UK)/BBC One HD transmission date/time
Episode 1	23 January 2012 22:35	27 March 2012 23:35 (1 hour later on BBC One Scotland)
Episode 2	30 January 2012 22:35	2 April 2012 23:35 (30 mins earlier on BBC One Scotland)
Episode 3	6 February 2012 22:35	10 April 2012 23:40 (30 mins later on BBC One Wales & 1 hour later on BBC One Scotland)
Episode 4	13 February 2012 22:35	17 April 2012 23:40 (30 mins later on BBC One Wales & 1 hour later on BBC One Scotland)
Episode 5	20 February 2012 22:35	24 April 2012 23:40 (40 mins later on BBC One Wales & 1 hour later on BBC One Scotland)
Episode 6	27 February 2012 22:35	1 May 2012 23:50 (40 mins later on BBC One Wales & 1 hour later on BBC One Scotland)
Episode 7	5 March 2012 22:35	8 May 2012 23:40 (30 mins later on BBC One Scotland & 40 mins later on BBC One Wales)
Episode 8	12 March 2012 22:35	15 May 2012 23:40 (30 mins later on BBC One Wales & 1 hour later on BBC One Scotland)

The episode shown on BBC One on 17 April 2012 was the final ever programme to be broadcast on the old analogue television system across London.
