= Gale Hansen =

American film and television actor (born 1960)

- Born: July 18, 1959 (age 67)
- Occupations: Actor, film executive, producer
- Spouse: Evangeline Quiroz (m. 1986)
- Children: 2

Gale Hansen (born 1959) is an American film and television actor best known for playing Charlie "Nuwanda" Dalton in Dead Poets Society.

== Career ==
Hansen started acting with a bit part in Woody Allen's Zelig; his breakout role came with Dead Poets Society in 1989, in which Hansen played rebellious high school student Charlie Dalton. The subsequent year, Hansen played one of the leads in Shaking the Tree alongside Courteney Cox, followed by The Finest Hour alongside Rob Lowe. He had a starring role in the drama series Class of '96. After a stint of supporting roles, Hansen quit acting due to a car accident in 1998, and found it difficult to return. He works as an acting teacher and studio executive, having worked as the latter in films including The Social Network and Paul. He returned to acting with several short and independent feature films, including You Are Here with Judd Nelson in 2026.

== Personal life ==
Hansen married dancer Evangeline Quiroz in 1986. They have two children.

== Filmography ==
Year	Title	Role	Notes
1983	Zelig	Freshman #1	
1989	Dead Poets Society	Charlie Dalton	
1990	Shaking the Tree	John "Sully" Sullivan	
1991	Under Surveillance	Joel Pierson	
1991	The Finest Hour	Dean Mazzoli	a.k.a. Desert Shield
1992	Double Vision	Michael	TV movie
1993	Class of '96	Samuel "Stroke" Dexter	17 episodes
1994	Murder, She Wrote	Arnold Wynn / Jason Bayer Saxon	1 episode
1998	Beyond Belief: Fact or Fiction	Security Guard	1 episode, (final appearance)
2024	Good Bad Things	Dad	
2026	You Are Here	Joe Donald	
