= Seekers (TV series) =

- Poster of Seekers
- Genre: Mystery comedy drama
- Written by: Lynda La Plante
- Directed by: Peter Barber-Fleming
- Starring: Brenda Fricker; Josette Simon
- Theme music composer: Daryl Runswick
- Country of origin: United Kingdom
- Original language: English
- No. of seasons: 1
- No. of episodes: 2

Production
- Executive producer: Ted Childs
- Producer: Sarah Lawson
- Running time: approx. 230 minutes
- Production company: Central Television

Original release
- Network: ITV
- Release: 25 April – 28 April 1993

Seekers is a two-part TV miniseries airing on ITV from 25 to 28 April 1993 about a private detective who disappears, and when his wife tries to find him, she discovers... another wife. They team up to search for him. It starred Brenda Fricker and Josette Simon, and was written by the celebrated novelist and screenwriter Lynda La Plante who also wrote the book of the same name. It was produced by Sarah Lawson.

== Selected cast and crew ==
=== Cast ===
- Michael Carter - Mike Hazard
- Ken Bones - Tony Laytham
- George Innes - Kenny Graham
- Andy Rashleigh - James Donald
- Harry Jones - Al Franks
- Brenda Fricker - Stella Hazard
- Josette Simon - Susie Hazard
- John Blakey - Kingston Officer
- Tina Martin - Nurse
- Graham Sinclair - D. I. Kent
- John Rowe - Mr.Sidwick
- Dick Sullivan - Priest
- Marshall Napier - Wright
- Lisa Bowerman - Stable Girl (uncredited)

=== Crew ===
- Director - Peter Barber-Fleming
- Writer - Lynda La Plante
- Producer - Sarah Lawson
- Composer - Daryl Runswick
- Executive Producer - Ted Childs

== See also ==
- Lynda La Plante
- Sarah Lawson
- Ted Childs
- Brenda Fricker
- Josette Simon
