= Ned Schmidtke =

American actor (1942–2024)

- Born: June 19, 1942
- Died: June 12, 2024 (aged 81)
- Occupation: Actor
- Years active: 1973–2024

Ned Schmidtke Jr. (June 19, 1942 – June 12, 2024) was an American film and television actor. He played Greg Barnard on the U.S. TV show Another World. Schmidtke died on June 12, 2024, at the age of 81.

== Partial filmography ==
- The Crazies (1973) - Sgt. Tragesser
- Another World (1977–1978, TV Series) - Greg Barnard
- First Steps (1985, TV Movie) - Dr. Chandler Phillips
- The Manhattan Project (1986) - Jenny's Parent
- Murder Ordained (1987, TV Movie) - Jeff Ellis
- Rent-a-Cop (1987) - Lindy
- Music Box (1989) - Dean Talbot
- Shaking the Tree (1990) - Mr. Jack
- The Babe (1992) - Hospital Reporter
- Chain Reaction (1996) - Wisconsin Chief Schmidke
- Early Edition (1996–1999, TV Series) - Ralph Stites / Mr. Roberts
- The Relic (1997) - Capt. Martin
- My Best Friend's Wedding (1997) - Captain
- Tangled (1997) - Pauley
- Mercury Rising (1998) - Senator
- Roswell (2001, TV Series) - Pit Boss
- The Practice (2001, TV Series) - Dr. Donald Sideman
- The West Wing (2001–2002, TV Series) - Admiral, Navy Chief of Staff / Industry Leader #1
- JAG (2001–2004, TV Series) - Congressman Harold Fetzer / Senior Member
- Passions (2003, TV Series) - Dr. Wirtz
- Fastlane (2003, TV Series) - Sheriff Groves
- Crossing Jordan (2003, TV Series) - Richard Daniels
- ER (2003, TV Series)
- Uncle Nino (2003) - Executive
- Malcolm in the Middle (2004, TV Series) - Manfred Schmidt
- NYPD Blue (2004, TV Series) - Father McIntyre
- Judging Amy (2004, TV Series) - Dr. Herrick Cohen
- XXX: State of the Union (2005) - General Jack Pettibone
- Wedding Crashers (2005) - Frank Meyers
- Cold Case (2005, TV Series) - Art Balducci - 2005
- Point Pleasant (2005–2006, TV Series) - Father Matthew
- Without a Trace (2006, TV Series) - Greg the Minister
- Huff (2006, TV Series) - Allen Meeks
- Accepted (2006) - Dr. J. Alexander
- The Unit (2006, TV Series) - Don Rohmer
- NCIS: Naval Criminal Investigative Service (2006, TV Series) - Congressman Frank Getz
- The Young and the Restless (2007, TV Series) - Lucas Hollenbeck
- Jericho (2007, TV Series) - Reverend Frank Young
- Dirt (2008, TV Series) - O'Connor
- The Express: The Ernie Davis Story (2008) - Bill Clark
- Medium (2008–2009, TV Series) - Terry Cavanaugh
- Heroes (2009, TV Series) - Martin Gray
- Numb3rs (2009, TV Series) - Roy Detchemendy (uncredited)
- 24 (2009, TV Series) - Dr. Lee Schulman
- Criminal Minds (2010, TV Series) - Austin Chapman
- Lie to Me (2010, TV Series) - Don Galpern
- The Change-Up (2011) - Ted Norton
