= The Christmas Tree (novel) =

1981 book by Jennifer Johnston

- First edition
- Author: Jennifer Johnston
- Cover artist: Craig Dodd
- Language: English
- Publisher: Hamish Hamilton (UK); William Morrow (US)
- Publication date: 1981 (UK), 1982 (US)
- Publication place: Ireland
- Media type: Print
- Pages: 168
- ISBN: 0-241-10673-7

The Christmas Tree is Irish author Jennifer Johnston's sixth novel, first published in 1981 by Hamish Hamilton. It has been suggested by The Irish Times as being her finest work, and was chosen by the Irish Independent to be published as one of the books its "Irish Women Writers" collection. It is one of U.S. writer Lionel Shriver's favourite books and was adapted for television in 1986.

== Plot introduction ==
At the age of 45, Constance Keating a failed writer living in London, having just given birth to a daughter is told that the weakness she had been experiencing was not as a result of her pregnancy but due to Leukaemia. She has returned to her childhood home in Ballsbridge, a suburb of Dublin, determined to die at home and not fight the disease in hospital - much to the consternation of her sister Bibi, who has agreed to look after the baby. She writes to Jacob Weinberg, a Polish Jew and Holocaust survivor with whom she had a brief affair whilst on holiday in Italy, to tell him he is a father and inviting him to come and take the baby away and look after it. As Christmas approaches and the disease advances, she drinks whisky and the occasional painkiller, under the care of Bill, her sympathetic GP, and Bridie, a young Catholic girl recruited by her sister. The narrative switches between her slow decline and episodes from past life, including leaving Trinity College and moving to London, her literary failures, the death of her parents, and prominently her short time spent with Jacob.

== Reception ==
- Caroline Moorehead in The Spectator praises Johnston, "She is a skilful writer, using short flashbacks... in such a way that each page widens the picture. You start with a solitary woman, dying alone; you finish with a past, a history, great tenderness and no sentimentality"
- The Irish Times selects the novel as one of twelve representing the best writing from Dublin: "Constance emerges as a brave, optimistic character and yet again Jennifer Johnston demonstrates not only what a good writer she is, but her astute understanding of human behaviour – the fears, the defiance and the small acts of courage – in a novel, so remarkable, it may well be her finest".
- Kirkus Reviews begins, "a small, spare novel that uses perfect detail and disarming, plain-edged prose to transcend its rather familiar outline" and concludes "a sad, pinched tale strangely blossoms into something warm and joyous. From start to finish: an impeccable piece of realistic fiction, with routine material transcended by art at its most clear-eyed and unpretentious".
- Martyn Goff in the Daily Telegraph writes "It is difficult to convey the marvellous quality of this book. Constance Keating is a major fictional portrait, her death finally noble".

== Publication history ==
- 1981, UK, Hamish Hamilton, ISBN 0-241-10673-7, Pub date 17 Sep 1981, Hardback
- 1982, US, William Morrow, ISBN 0-688-01133-0, Pub date Jan 1982, Hardback
- 1982, UK, Fontana, ISBN 0-00-616463-3, Pub date 28 Oct 1982, Paperback
- 1986, UK, Flamingo, ISBN 0-00-654129-1, Pub date 10 Feb 1986, Paperback
- 1989, UK, Penguin, ISBN 0-14-012061-0, Pub date 23 Nov 1989, Paperback
- 1999, UK, Headline, ISBN 0-7472-6258-6, Pub date 7 Oct 1999, Paperback

== Television adaptation ==
The novel was adapted for television in 1986 by Yorkshire Television with a screenplay by William Corlett and directed by Herbert Wise. The cast included:

- Constance - Anna Massey
- Jacob - Simon Callow
- Bill - T. P. McKenna
- Bibi - Fiona Walker
- Bridie - Maeve Germaine
