= That's Love (TV series) =

British television sitcom (1988–1992)

- Created by: Terence Frisby
- Written by: Terence Frisby
- Directed by: John Stroud
- Starring: Jimmy Mulville; Diana Hardcastle; Liza Goddard; Tony Slattery
- Theme music composer: Richard Myhill
- Opening theme: Sung by Paul Johnson
- Country of origin: United Kingdom
- Original language: English
- No. of series: 4
- No. of episodes: 26

Production
- Executive producers: John Kaye Cooper; Sarah Lawson; Gill Stribling-Wright
- Producer: Humphrey Barclay
- Running time: 30 minutes (including adverts)
- Production companies: Lawson Group; Taft Entertainment; TVS Television

Original release
- Network: ITV
- Release: 19 January 1988 – 24 March 1992

That's Love! is a British television sitcom about the domestic problems of a young married couple, lawyer Donald (Jimmy Mulville) and designer Patsy (Diana Hardcastle). The programme was produced by TVS and first broadcast on ITV between 1988 and 1992.

Four series were made, produced by Humphrey Barclay and directed by John Stroud. All 26 episodes were written by Terence Frisby, and it was executive produced by John Kaye Cooper, Sarah Lawson and Gill Stribling-Wright. There has been no domestic commercial release of the series on any format in the UK.

== Plot ==
Series 1 and 2 are fairly straightforward sitcom fare, with very little in the way of story arcs or connecting episodes. Much of the comedic content is concentrated on Donald and Patsy continuing to learn about one another despite several years together. In the first episode, Donald discovers his wife has not told him the whole truth concerning her life before they married - specifically, how many previous sexual partners she has had. The last episode of the second series reveals that, despite appearances from their photograph album, Donald and Patsy are not actually married.

The third series focuses on an affair between Donald and his client Laurel (Liza Goddard), which unfortunately kicks off just after Patsy and Donald finally tie the knot, leading to their visiting a marriage guidance counsellor in the first episode of the fourth and final series. The counsellor, Tristan Beasley (Tony Slattery) falls in love with Patsy, and they embark on an affair, but Patsy, realising she won't feel the same way about Tristan, ends the relationship. In the final moment of the series, Patsy runs to Donald's arms, apologising to him for what she has done - it is left up to the viewer to decide whether the couple's marriage is doomed or they may be able to rescue their relationship.

== Cast ==
- Jimmy Mulville - Donald Redfern
- Diana Hardcastle - Patsy Redfern
- Liza Goddard - Laurel Manasotti (series 3)
- Tony Slattery - Tristan Beasley (series 4)

Recurring cast

- Phyllida Law - Babs
- Ralph Nossek - Victor
- Lynne Pearson - Amanda Owen
- Rob Spendlove - Gary (series 1)
- Neil Pearson - Gary (series 2-4)
- Vivienne McKone - Olive (series 1-2)
- Robin Meredith - Geoffrey (series 3)
- Nicolas Colicos - Hank (series 3-4)
- Zoe Hodges - Redfern child
- Matt Cole - Redfern child
- Matthew Perry - Owen child
- Eleanor Puttock - Owen child
- Lloyd Meikle - Owen child (series 1)
- Romy Chasan - Owen child (series 1-2)
- Alice May Wilkinson - Owen child (series 2)
- Laura Elliott - Owen child (series 3)
- Olivia Silver - Owen child (series 3)
