= St Catherine's Church, Dublin (Roman Catholic) =

St Catherine's
- St Catherine's, Meath Street
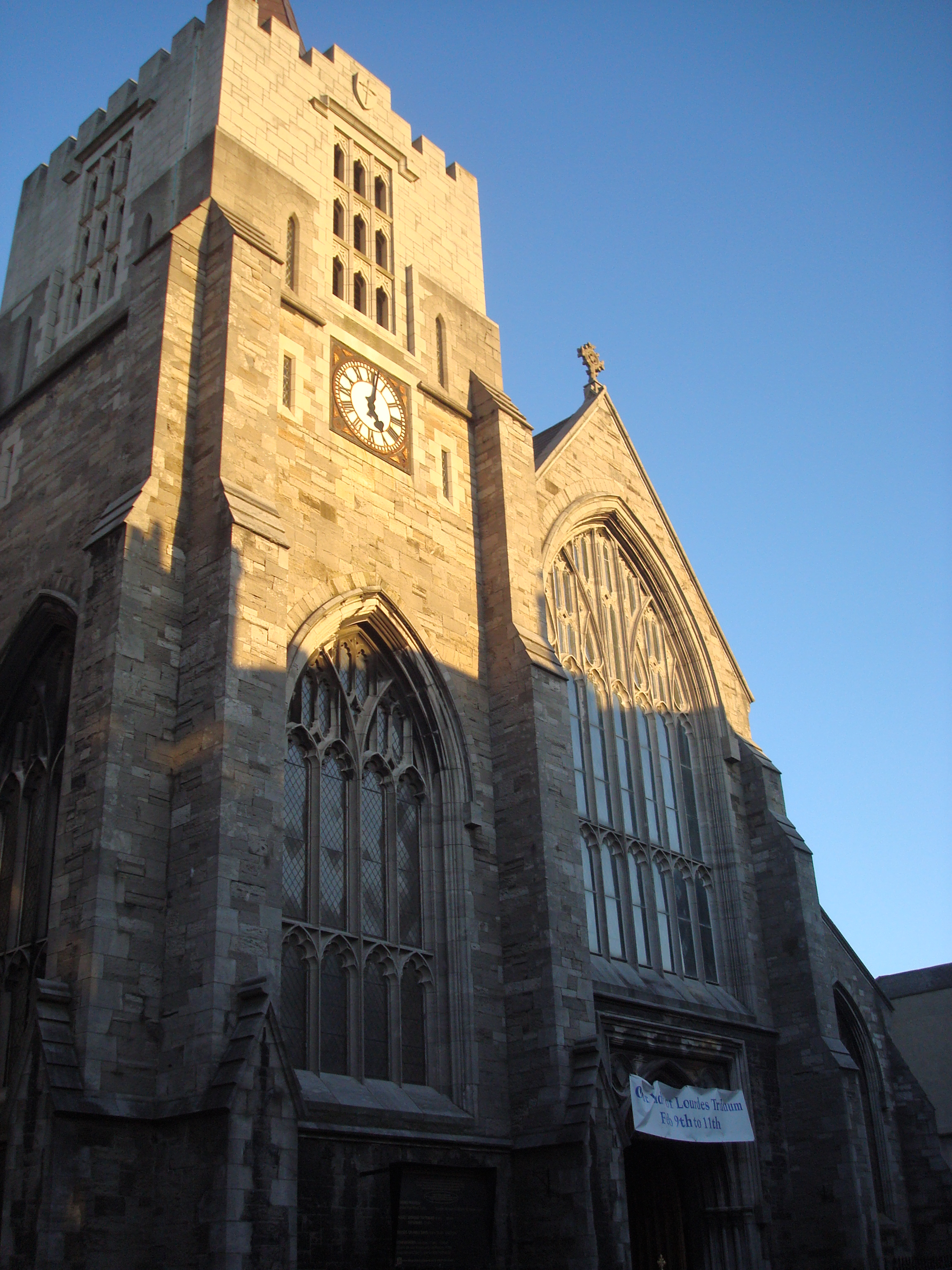
- St Catherine's
- 53.34211°N 6.278623°W
- Location: Meath Street; Dublin
- Country: Ireland
- Denomination: Roman Catholic
- Website: https://www.meathstreetparish.ie/

History
- Dedication: Catherine of Alexandria
- Dedicated: 30 June 1858

Architecture
- Architect: James Joseph McCarthy
- Architectural type: Church

Administration
- Archdiocese: Dublin
- Deanery: South City Centre
- Parish: Meath Street, John's lane Parish

St Catherine's is a Roman Catholic church on Meath Street, Dublin, that is in use today. It was dedicated in 1858 and is the second church to occupy the same site. There is also a small grotto dedicated to Our Lady of Lourdes located on the grounds.

== History ==
There have been two churches on this site, the first being an octagonal chapel opened in 1782. The chapel and a presbytery were knocked down to make way for a bigger church. The foundation stone of the new church was laid on 30 June 1852. The architect was James Joseph McCarthy and construction of the main church was completed in March 1858, but the original design of the upper portion of the tower and spire was never completed. The church was dedicated to Catherine of Alexandria on 30 June 1858.

James Joyce's first short story, The Sisters, concerns a former priest of St Catherine's Church, Meath Street.

A small grotto was built on the grounds and dedicated to Our Lady of Lourdes. It was renovated and rededicated in 2000.

The church suffered damage from an arson attack in January 2012.

Brenda Fricker was buried here after dying.

== Gallery ==
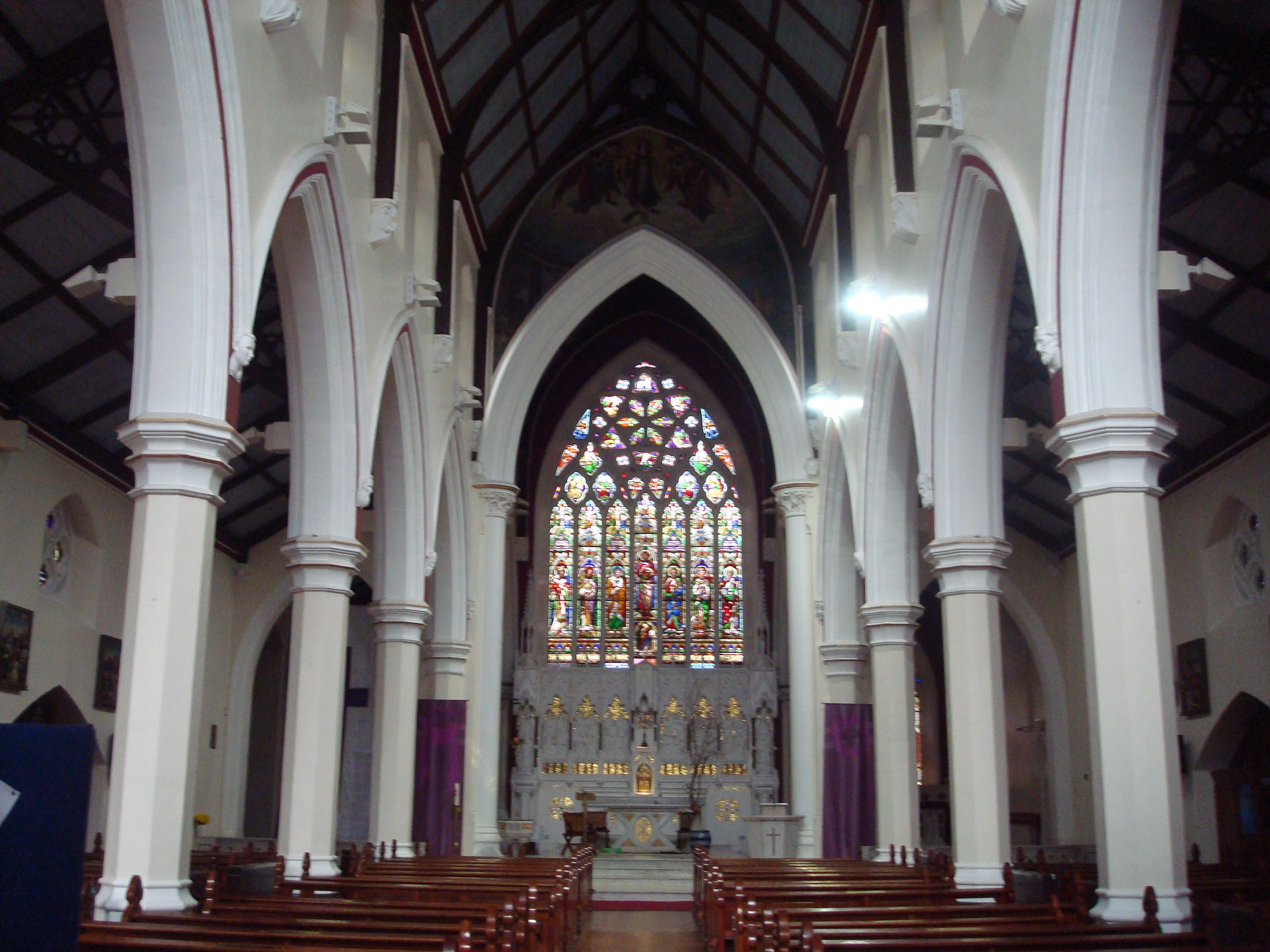
Inside the church

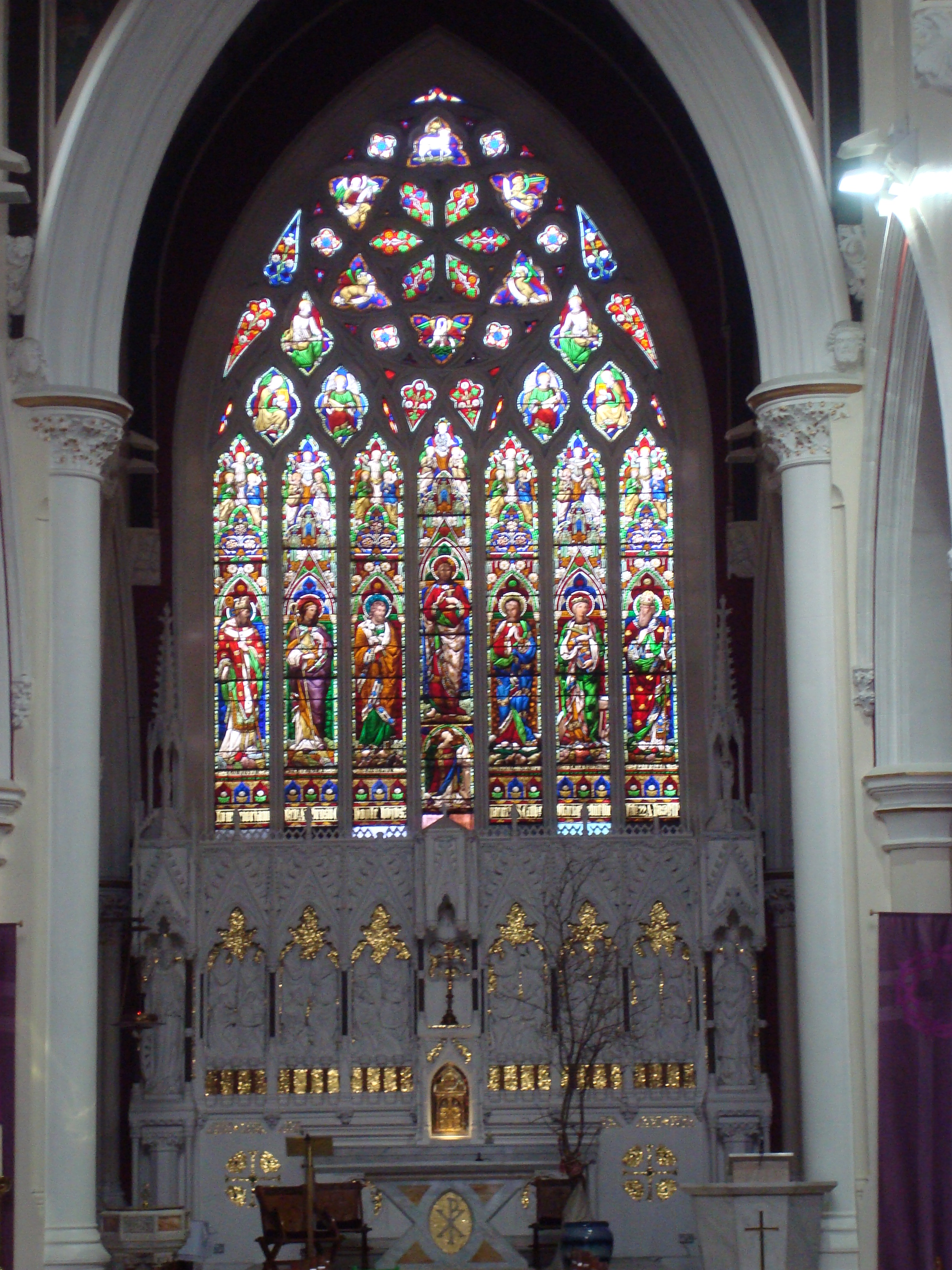
The altar before the fire of January 2012

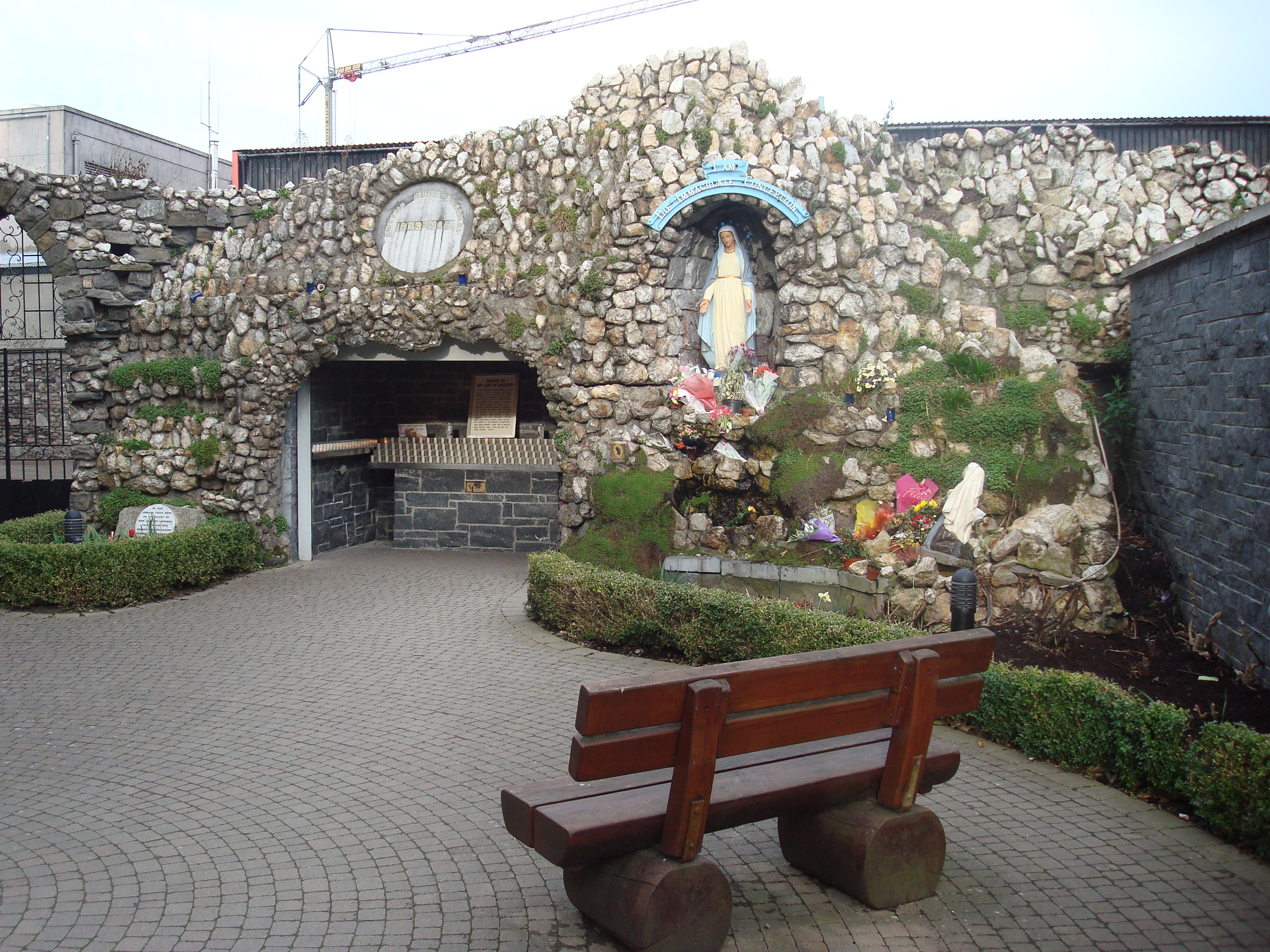
The grotto dedicated to Our Lady of Lourdes

== See also ==
- St Catherine's L.F.C.
