= Grace and Truth =

2005 novel by Jennifer Johnston

- First edition
- Author: Jennifer Johnston
- Language: English
- Publisher: Headline Books
- Publication date: 2005
- Publication place: Ireland
- Media type: Print & Audio
- Pages: 224
- ISBN: 0-7472-6751-0

Grace and Truth is a novel by Irish writer Jennifer Johnston, first published in 2005 by Headline Books.

== Plot introduction ==
On returning to her home in Goatstown, Dublin after a successful European stage tour, actress Sally is shocked when her husband Charlie announces he is leaving her. Sally finds herself alone and determines to discover the truth about her family...
