= The Scheme =

- Genre: Documentary
- Narrated by: Jamie Lee
- Theme music composer: David Francis Hamill
- Country of origin: Scotland
- Original languages: English; Scots
- No. of episodes: 5

Production
- Executive producer: Ewan Angus
- Production location: Kilmarnock
- Camera setup: Single-camera setup
- Running time: 50 minutes

Original release
- Network: BBC One Scotland
- Release: 18 May 2010 – 30 May 2011

The Scheme is a BBC Scotland BAFTA-award-winning documentary series which follows the lives of six families in the Onthank and Knockinlaw housing schemes in Kilmarnock. The series has been the subject of some media criticism, with the series being labelled as "poverty porn" and described as giving a "misleading impression" of life on the estate.

The programme makers have denied allegations that their series exploits the residents of the estate.

== Episodes ==
Initially, four episodes were made, but only the first two episodes were aired during the intended broadcast schedule. Episodes 3 and 4 were originally postponed due to a court case involving a participant in the series. Since broadcast of these episodes could have potentially influenced a jury, BBC Scotland had no choice but to postpone transmission of the episodes The series made a return in full from episode one on 16 May 2011. All episodes were repeated to the rest of the United Kingdom on BBC One from 14 June – 12 July 2011. A fifth episode was also broadcast during this run; it was filmed a year after the other episodes and caught up with some of the people featured in the first four episodes.

=== Episode One ===
The first episode introduced viewers to the Cunningham family: father Gordon and mother Annie, 15-year-old daughter Kimberley, and sons Chris,Brian and David. Also featured were "recovering" drug addict Marvin, his girlfriend Dayna (on early release from prison with an electronic tag) and his dog Bullet. Also featuring in the first episode were single mother Kay, and her daughters Candice (15) and Kendal (5). Kay also provides accommodation to the homeless 17-year-old Jenna and Gary, who is battling a drink addiction.

Among events in Episode 1: Gordon and Annie's son Brian ends up in prison after a breach of the peace charge; their youngest son Chris ends up in trouble with drug dealers; Gary is evicted from Kay's house; Marvin suffers an overdose and later is arrested for the weekend after a bust-up with a pregnant Dayna.

=== Episode Two ===
In the second episode, Gordon tries to get a job; Marvin's cousin moves in next door provoking a violent confrontation with Dayna; Kay gets arrested for assaulting a neighbour; Kimberley takes part in a dancing competition; and the Cree family make a first appearance. The Cree family have been involved in community initiatives for two generations, and opened the area's first community centre. They are now seeking to reopen it, and are raising money towards the reopening and running costs, but despite being offered a peppercorn rent, are struggling to raise the money to run it.

Kay loses patience with her young tenants and throws them out, and Bullet the dog ends up being rehomed after a dispute over a vet's bill resulting from an accident when he runs away. Dayna also leaves abruptly.

=== Episodes Three and Four ===
At the end of the second programme, the following announcement was read out over the title sequence: "For legal reasons not connected with anyone who has appeared in the series to date, transmission of the final two episodes of The Scheme will now be subject to a delay. They'll be rescheduled for broadcast at a later date."

It was planned, following the resolution of the court case, that episodes three and four would air on 27 July and 3 August 2010 respectively. However, these episodes were postponed further due to a new court case.

A further indefinite delay was announced when one of the show's "stars" – Chris Cunningham – was charged with armed robbery concerning an offence which allegedly took place in May 2010. These episodes were broadcast on 23 and 24 May 2011, with repeats of the first two episodes of the series being aired first the week before with a special update programme taking place on 30 May 2011.

== Spin-off ==
In 2012, BBC One Northern Ireland broadcast a similar series, The Estate, set in the Ballysally Estate in Coleraine.
