= The Illusionist (Johnston novel) =

1995 novel by Jennifer Johnston

- First edition
- Author: Jennifer Johnston
- Language: English
- Publisher: Sinclair Stevenson
- Publication date: 1995
- Publication place: Ireland
- Media type: Print
- Pages: 208
- ISBN: 1-85619-755-7

The Illusionist is a 1995 novel by Irish author Jennifer Johnston, and considered one of her best works. It gained positive reviews in The Irish Times, Times Literary Supplement and the New Statesman.

== Premise ==
The story consists of two interlinked narratives. In the first, set in Dublin, 58-year-old Stella Glover meets with her daughter Robin after the funeral of her estranged husband Martyn, and seeks reconciliation with her. The other narrative consists of flashbacks to her past life in London; her first meeting with Martyn who describes himself as an 'illusionist', their marriage, the birth of Robin, and Stella's growing frustration with Martyn about whom she knows nothing. He refuses to tell her anything about his family, his past or the nature of his career, he provides her with every luxury but insists she gives him privacy. Eventually Martyn's behaviour becomes increasingly difficult and Stella is forced to leave him and her daughter behind and return to her parents in Dublin. But to Robin, Martyn continues to be the perfect father and she cannot forgive Stella for leaving him...

== Reviews ==
- Magic Tricks: Harriet Paterson reads a jagged tale of marital deceit review from The Independent
