= Shaking the Tree (film) =

- Directed by: Duane Clark
- Written by: Duane Clark; Steven Wilde
- Produced by: Robert J. Wilson
- Starring: Arye Gross; Gale Hansen; Doug Savant; Steven Wilde
- Cinematography: Rohn Schmidt
- Edited by: Martin L. Bernstein
- Music by: David E. Russo
- Production companies: Magnificent Mile Productions; Reality Productions
- Release dates: October 1990 (Chicago International Film Festival); 15 November 1991 (UK)
- Running time: 97 minutes
- Country: United States
- Language: English

Shaking the Tree is a 1990 American comedy-drama film directed by Duane Clark, starring Arye Gross, Gale Hansen, Doug Savant and Steven Wilde.

== Cast ==
- Arye Gross as Barry
- Gale Hansen as John "Sully" Sullivan
- Doug Savant as Michael
- Steven Wilde as Terry "Duke" Keegan
- Courteney Cox as Kathleen
- Christina Haag as Michelle
- Michael Arabian as Nickel
- Dennis Cockrum as Bannelli
- Nathan Davis as Grandpa Sullivan
- Ron Dean as Duke's Father
- Brittney Hansen as Brigette
- Turk Muller as Ape
- Ned Schmidtke as Mr. Jack
- Maurice Chasse as Cashier
- Mik Scriba as Tony Villanova
- Barbara Robertson as Nurse
- Kirk Thatcher as Craps Player

== Reception ==
Stephen Holden of The New York Times wrote that the "flaw at the heart" of the film was the "improbability of such cross sections of humanity ever cohering in real life."

Roger Ebert of RogerEbert.com rated the film 0.5 stars out of 4 and wrote, "The characters and their problems are both so cliched that it makes you wonder if the filmmakers had ever seen a movie before; didn't they realize how stunningly unoriginal, how worn out and overused, this material was?"

Peter Rainer of the Los Angeles Times called the film "yet another Diner wannabe".
