= The Dawning =

- DVD cover
- Directed by: Robert Knights
- Screenplay by: Moira Williams
- Based on: The Old Jest by Jennifer Johnston
- Produced by: Sarah Lawson
- Starring: Anthony Hopkins; Rebecca Pidgeon; Hugh Grant; Trevor Howard; Jean Simmons; Adrian Dunbar
- Cinematography: Adrian Biddle
- Edited by: Max Lemon
- Music by: Simon May
- Distributed by: TVS Television; The Vista Organisation Ltd.
- Release date: August 1988; (WFF)
- Running time: 97 minutes
- Country: United Kingdom
- Language: English

The Dawning is a 1988 British drama film based on Jennifer Johnston's novel, The Old Jest, which depicts the Irish War of Independence through the eyes of the Anglo-Irish landlord class. It stars Anthony Hopkins, Hugh Grant, Jean Simmons, Trevor Howard, and Rebecca Pidgeon, and was produced by Sarah Lawson, through her company Lawson Productions.

== Plot ==
Angus Barrie, an Irish Republican Army member, is walking through hills, and comes to rest on a beach, where there is a little hut. Meanwhile, Nancy Gulliver having just left school, burns all her books in happiness. It is her birthday, and her aunt has invited Harry over for tea, with whom she is desperately in love. As a result of Harry’s behaviour with another girl and the way he treats Nancy, she realises that her love for Harry was nothing more than childish infatuation.

One day, Nancy goes down to the beach, and notices that her hut has been slept in. She leaves a note requesting that it be left alone. Soon after, she is on the beach reading, when Barrie comes up to her. The two develop a relationship, despite her not really knowing and understanding his job: he is one of the first people that became part of a group named the IRA, and is on the run from the government. Nevertheless, she grows fond of Barrie, and dubs him "Cassius" ("because you have a lean and hungry look!")

After Cassius asks her to pass on a message to a colleague, several Officers of the British Army are gunned down at a horse race show. Later that day, Captain Rankin of the Black and Tans comes to see the Family, and asks if anyone knows where Cassius is. The officers' suspicion is aroused when Nancy's grandfather says he saw her talking to a man on the beach. She denies any knowledge. When they leave, she runs to the hut on the beach where Cassius was staying to tell him to flee, only to find that he has already packed. As they walk out, a light shines on them: the Black and Tans have found him. He is gunned down, much to Nancy's distress. Nancy returns home, now considerably older and wiser.

== Cast ==
- Anthony Hopkins as Cassius a.k.a. Angus Barrie
- Rebecca Pidgeon as Nancy Gulliver
- Jean Simmons as Aunt Mary
- Trevor Howard as Grandfather
- Tara MacGowran as Maeve
- Hugh Grant as Harry
- Nicholas Fitzsimons as Slain Soldier
- Ronnie Masterson as Bridie
- John Rogan as Mr. Carroll
- Joan O'Hara as Maurya
- Charmian May as Celia Brabazon
- Ann Way as George Brabazon
- Mark O'Regan as Joe Mulhare
- Brendan Laird as Tommy Roche
- Adrian Dunbar as Capt. Rankin
- Geoffrey Greenhill as Cpl. Tweedie

== Production ==
The Dawning was filmed in Ireland in the mid-1980s, largely on location in Ireland.The beach scenes were filmed extensively at Goat Island, a small cove on the Irish coast, close to the county boundary between Cork and Waterford. Some "Big House" exteriors were shot at Woodbine Hill in the same district. Incidentally, it was Rebecca Pidgeon's first feature film, and Trevor Howard's final film; he died shortly after production ended, and the film was dedicated to him. (Howard had made an earlier IRA film in 1946, the classic I See a Dark Stranger.) It was also Jean Simmons' first feature film for nearly ten years. Despite having contributed largely to the production, Bernard MacLaverty was uncredited as a screenwriter. The film was shown at the AFI/Los Angeles International Film Festival (New British Cinema - BritFest 2), the Cannes Film Festival (for market purposes), and at the Montreal World Film Festival (in competition, where it was successful, winning two prizes). Actors Anthony Hopkins and Hugh Grant reunited five years later in the Academy Award-nominated film The Remains of the Day.

== Reception ==
=== Critical reception ===
It received a five star review from Time Out, describing the film as "solidly crafted ... its main strength lies in the performances" and mentioning that Rebecca Pidgeon had given a "remarkable debut". China Daily noted that Hopkins had played his character "wonderfully". Hilary Mantel of The Spectator gave it a negative review, praising the fine performances and faithfulness to the book but that: "Decorous direction and a stately pace render it indistinguishable from all those other films where sweet gels in pretty frocks take tea in the garden."

=== Accolades ===
- Montreal World Film Festival (1988)
  - won Jury Prize Robert Knights
  - won Prize of the Ecumenical Jury - Special Mention - Robert Knights
- Austin Texas International Film Festival (1988)
  - Won best picture award
