= Foolish Mortals =

2025 video game

- Developer: Inklingwood Studios
- Publisher: Inklingwood Studios
- Director: David Younger
- Producer: David Younger
- Designer: David Younger
- Programmer: Sophie Younger
- Artists: David Chapura, Lucas Benitez, Daniel Pinal Negrete
- Writer: David Younger
- Composer: Richard Prohm
- Engine: Visionaire Studio
- Platforms: Microsoft Windows, macOS
- Release: November 5, 2025
- Genre: Point-and-click adventure game
- Mode: Single-player

Foolish Mortals is a point-and-click adventure game developed and published by Inklingwood Studios for Windows and macOS. It was released on November 5, 2025, for PC, with other platforms following at a later date.

== Gameplay ==
In Foolish Mortals, players control Murphy McCallan as he navigates various environments, interacts with characters, and solves puzzles using an inventory system. Gameplay is divided into acts, each comprising multiple puzzle chains that can often be worked on in parallel. Solving puzzles and uncovering clues across different threads advances the narrative, leading to major plot developments. The game also includes a built-in hint system in the form of Murphy's diary. It summarizes current objectives and can offer step-by-step guidance if needed.

== Plot ==
The game is set in 1933 in Louisiana on the fictional island of Devil's Rock. The protagonist, Murphy McCallan, arrives on the island seeking the lost treasure of Bellemore Manor, a fortune whose location vanished when, thirty‑three years earlier, an entire wedding party mysteriously disappeared from the manor. As Murphy explores the island and the manor, he uncovers clues about the vanished wedding and the fate of its guests. Through investigation, puzzle‑solving, and interactions with other characters, Murphy unravels the mystery.

== Development ==
Foolish Mortals was developed by the independent studio Inklingwood Studios, led by David Younger and Sophie Younger. The game was built using Visionaire Studio. The project originated from David Younger's longtime ambition to create a classic point-and-click adventure; as he recalled, during his childhood, he used to sketch locations on paper and simulate adventure-game logic for friends. When professional work in theme-park design dried up due to the pandemic, he and Sophie decided to take the plunge and turn that childhood dream into a real game.

A Kickstarter campaign was launched in 2023 to fund production costs, including voice acting and localization. The campaign received 405% of its goal; £48.652 from the £12.000 goal.

In November 2023, they exhibited the game at AdventureX expo in London and released an early demo of the game.

In July 2025, it was announced that the lead character, Murphy McCallan, would be voiced by A.J. LoCascio. Additional roles were provided by Matt Curtis, Andy Mack, Rhiannon Moushall, Phillip Sacramento, Will de Renzy‑Martin, Joey Sourlis, and Mirabel Ukpabio, among others. Voice direction and production were handled by The Game Editors, in collaboration with the developer Inklingwood Studios. Francisco González took care of voice direction and editing, while Jess Haskins was responsible for the voice production and script editing. In October 2025, a German text translation by Marcel Weyers was also announced for the release.

On November 5, 2025, the game was released on Steam and GOG.com.

== Reception ==
Reception

Aggregate score
Aggregator	Score
Metacritic	90/100

Foolish Mortals received "universal acclaim" by critics according to review aggregator platform Metacritic. Reviewers praised the game’s art style, voice acting, puzzles, and overall design.

Adventure Game Hotspot gave it 100% and called it “an absolute triumph,” highlighting the “expertly crafted scenes, puzzles, dialogue and quality‑of‑life user options.”

Ragequit.gr gave it 90% and said, "An excellent adventure from Inklingwood Studios, which is making a strong entry into the genre with an enviable debut."
