= Adrian Dunbar =

Irish actor (born 1958)

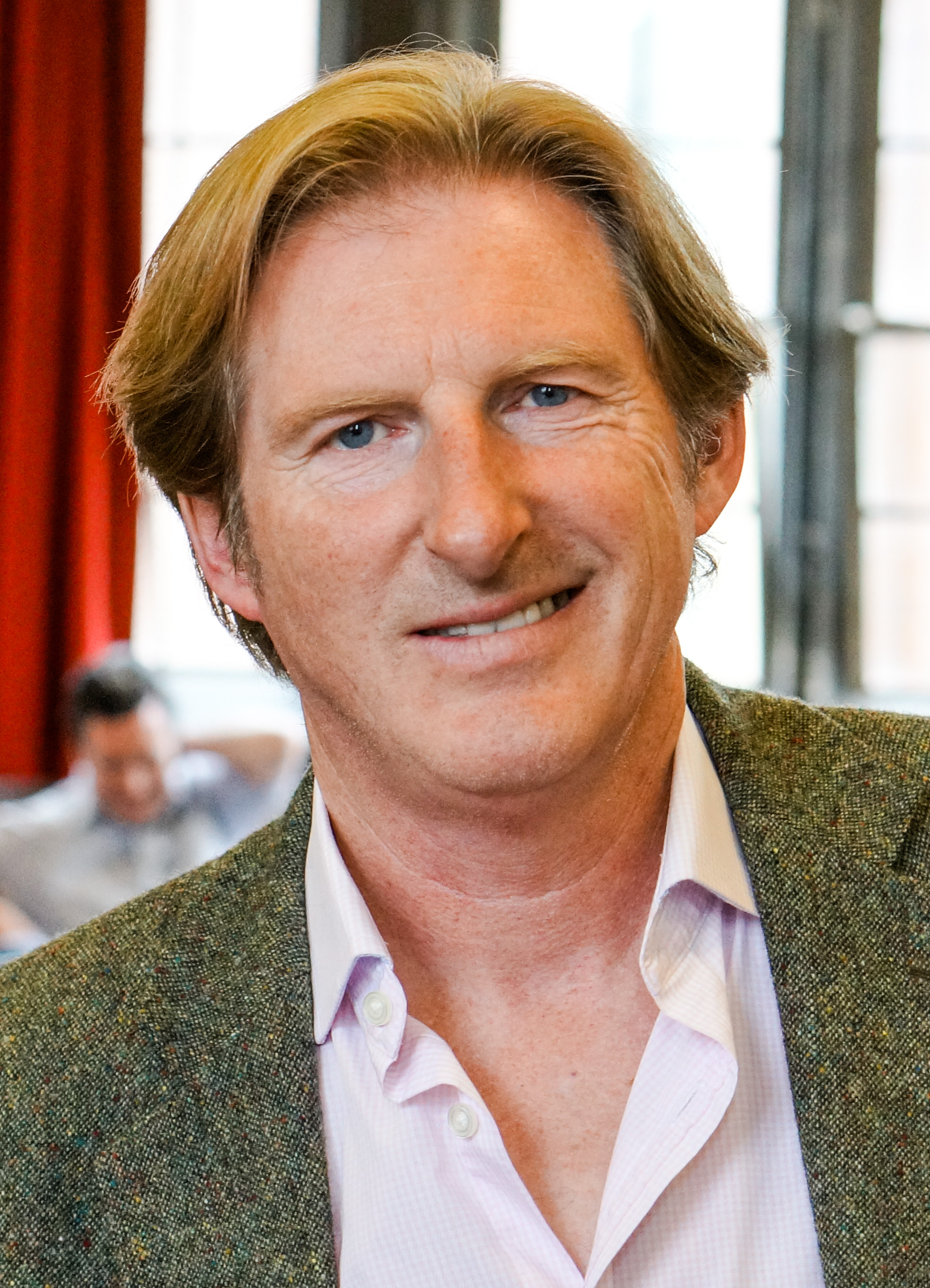
- Dunbar in 2014
- Born: 1 August 1958 (age 68); Enniskillen, County Fermanagh, Northern Ireland
- Education: Guildhall School of Music and Drama
- Occupations: Actor; screenwriter; director; singer
- Years active: 1980–present
- Notable work: Ashes to Ashes (2009); Line of Duty (2012–2021)
- Spouse: Anna Nygh (m. 1986)

Adrian Dunbar (born 1 August 1958) is an actor, director and singer from Northern Ireland, known for his television and theatre work. He co-wrote and starred in the 1991 film Hear My Song, nominated for Best Original Screenplay at the BAFTA awards.

Dunbar is also known for playing Superintendent Ted Hastings in the hit BBC crime drama Line of Duty (2012–21). He has also appeared as Alan Cox in The Jump, Martin Summers in Ashes to Ashes, Richard Plantagenet in The Hollow Crown and Father Flaherty in Broken. Since 2022, Dunbar has starred in the lead role of Alex Ridley in the ITV detective series Ridley. In 2024 he starred in Kiss Me Kate on stage.

Notable film work includes My Left Foot (1989), The Crying Game (1992) and deleted scenes in Star Wars: The Phantom Menace (1999). His TV guest appearances include Inspector Morse, Cracker, A Touch of Frost, Silk, Scott & Bailey, Silent Witness and Inside No. 9.

== Early life ==
Dunbar was born and brought up in Enniskillen, County Fermanagh, in Northern Ireland, the eldest of seven siblings. He has two brothers, John and Liam, and four sisters, Roisin, Cristina, Madeline and Moira. Raised in a Catholic family, he was educated at St Joseph's College in Enniskillen before attending the Guildhall School of Music and Drama in London.

== Career ==
=== Theatre ===
Dunbar's theatre credits include The Shaughraun and Exiles at Dublin's Abbey Theatre; Real Dreams and The Danton Affair at the Royal Shakespeare Company; King Lear, Pope's Wedding, Saved and Up to the Sun And Down to the Centre at Royal Court Theatre and Conversations on a Homecoming at the Lyric Theatre in Belfast; A Trinity of Two (as Oscar Wilde) at Dublin's Liberty Hall Theatre; and Boeing Boeing (London, 2007). He has directed a production of Philadelphia Here I Come!.

Dunbar is also a theatre director and has staged productions for the Happy Days Enniskillen International Beckett Festival. In 2020 he founded the multi-disciplinary arts company Unreal Cities with composer Nick Roth, whose work includes two Beckett Biennales (Beckett: Confined 2022, Beckett: Unbound 2024) as well as settings of poems by T.S. Eliot, Dermot Healy and Seamus Heaney.

In 2008, he starred in and co-directed Brendan at the Chelsea by Janet Behan, playing Brendan Behan. The play was the first to be staged in the Naughton Studio in the new Lyric Theatre in Belfast after it reopened in 2011, and it was revived for a tour to Theatre Row in New York City in September 2013.

He starred in the stage musical Kiss Me, Kate opposite Stephanie J. Block in 2024 at the Barbican Theatre.

=== Film ===
Dunbar has appeared in such notable films as My Left Foot, The Crying Game and The General. He has also had leading roles in the films Triggermen, Shooters, How Harry Became A Tree (with Colm Meaney), Richard III and Widows' Peak.

In 2008, Dunbar played the role of Philip Conolly in The Last Confession of Alexander Pearce. He starred alongside fellow Northern Irish actor Ciarán McMenamin in the remote rainforests of north-west Tasmania.

=== Television ===
On television, he starred in the first episode of Cracker, playing an innocent murder suspect with amnesia, and also the last episode of A Touch of Frost. He has been in many British productions, including Tough Love, Inspector Morse, Kidnapped, Murphy's Law, Murder in Mind, Ashes to Ashes and the 2005 re-staging of The Quatermass Experiment.

He played the mysterious character Martin Summers in the second series of Ashes to Ashes. In 2014, he played the title character in a BBC comedy drama, Walter.

Dunbar also starred as Jim Hogan in the Virgin Media Television original drama Blood.

He joined the cast of the police procedural television series Line of Duty in 2012, portraying the role of Superintendent Ted Hastings; he continued in this role for all subsequent series.

=== Radio ===
Dunbar played the role of Tullus Aufidius in the BBC Radio production of Coriolanus. He also made a guest appearance in the BBC Radio 4 series Baldi and appeared on stage as Vermeer in an adaptation of Girl with a Pearl Earring.

== Other media ==
- He was cast as Bail Organa for Star Wars: Episode I – The Phantom Menace and appeared in costume in publicity stills, but his scene was cut; the character was recast with Jimmy Smits for later films. Dunbar's likeness was retconned into the appearance of the character Bail Antilles.
- He fronts his own band, which has played in such American locations as Nashville, Tennessee, and Austin, Texas.
- He sings "The Curragh of Kildare" with Brian Kennedy on Kennedy's On Song and fronts this song with his own band.
- He narrates the TV series The Estate as well as an audiobook production of Eoin Colfer's novel Artemis Fowl.
- He played a minor role in The Dawning (1988), alongside Anthony Hopkins and Hugh Grant, which led to further early roles in his acting career.

== Awards and nominations ==
=== BAFTA Awards ===
BAFTA Awards
Year	Nominated work	Category	Result
1993	Hear My Song	Best Screenplay	Nominated
2018	Line of Duty	Best Supporting Actor	Nominated

=== Irish Film & Television Academy Awards ===
IFTA Awards
Year	Nominated work	Category	Result
2018	Line of Duty	Actor in a Lead Role in Drama	Nominated
2020	Line of Duty	Actor in a Lead Role in Drama	Nominated
2021	Line of Duty	Actor in a Lead Role in Drama	Nominated

=== National Television Awards ===
National Television Awards
Year	Nominated work	Category	Result
2021	Line of Duty	Drama Performance	Nominated

=== TV Choice Awards ===
TV Choice Awards
Year	Nominated work	Category	Result
2019	Line of Duty	Best Actor	Won
2021	Line of Duty	Best Actor	Nominated

=== GQ Men of the Year Awards ===
GQ Men of the Year Awards
Year	Nominated work	Category	Result
2021	Line of Duty	Television Actor	Won

== Personal life ==
Dunbar has a daughter and stepson from his 1986 marriage to Australian actress Anna Nygh. He lives in Crouch End, north London. He received an honorary degree of Doctor of Letters from the University of Ulster in June 2009 in recognition of his services to acting.

Dunbar believes a United Ireland is possible in the future, saying: "I expect Ireland to be unified and at peace with herself. Irish unification and freedom after hundreds of years is in our DNA, it is in effect a big part of who we have become to ourselves and the world".

== Filmography ==
=== Film ===
Year	Title	Role	Notes
1986	Sky Bandits	Mechanic	
1988	A World Apart	Le Roux	
1988	The Dawning	Capt. Rankin	
1989	Unusual Ground Floor Conversion	Alan Simpson	Short film
1989	My Left Foot	Peter	
1989	Dealers	Lennon Mayhew	
1991	Hear My Song	Micky O'Neill	
1992	The Playboys	Mick	
1992	The Crying Game	Maguire	
1994	Widows' Peak	Godfrey Doyle-Counihan	
1995	Innocent Lies	Alan Cross	
1995	The Near Room	Charlie Colquhoun	
1995	Richard III	James Tyrell	
1998	The General	Noel Curley	
1999	Star Wars: Episode I – The Phantom Menace	Senator Bail Organa	Deleted scene
2000	Last Orders		Short film
2000	Wild About Harry	J.J. McMahon	
2000	The Wedding Tackle	Mr Mac	
2001	How Harry Became a Tree	George	
2002	Triggermen	Andy Jarrett	
2002	Shooters	Max Bell	
2003	The Measure of My Days	Priest	Short film
2004	Mickybo and Me	Mickybo's Da	
2005	Against Nature	The Tramp	Short film
2006	Eye of the Dolphin	Hawk	
2008	The Last Confession of Alexander Pearce	Philip Conolly	
2009	Act of God	Frank O'Connor	
2011	Hideaways	Dr Russell	
2011	Mother's Milk	Seamus Dorke	
2012	Good Vibrations	Andy	
2016	The Secret Scripture	Dr Hart	
2017	The Snowman	Frederick Aasen	
2022	Emily	Patrick Brontë	

=== Television ===
Year	Title	Role	Notes
1980	The Long March	Colm	TV movie
1984	Play for Today	Peter Douglas	Episode: "The Cry"
1984	After You've Gone	Chris	TV movie
1984	The Hidden Curriculum	Boyd	TV movie
1985	The Price	Willy	4 episodes
1988	The Fear	Con	4 episodes
1988	The Four Minute Mile	Norris McWhirter	TV movie
1988	Screen Two	Robbie MacIntyre	Episode: "Reasonable Force"
1990	Screen Two	John	Episode: "Drowning in the Shallow End"
1990	Theatre Night	Lenny	Episode: "Pentecost"
1990	Debut on Two	John/Lucien	Episodes: "The Wake" and "A Box of Swan"
1990	Centrepoint	Brown	2 episodes
1990	ScreenPlay	Andy	Episode: "The Englishman's Wife"
1991	Children of the North	Martin Deeley	3 episodes
1992	ScreenPlay	DS Billy McCourbrey	Episode: "Force of Duty"
1992	Inspector Morse	John Marriat	Episode: "Dead on Time"
1993	A Statement of Affairs	Adrian	3 episodes
1993	Cracker	Kelly	Episodes: "The Mad Woman in the Attic", Parts 1 & 2
1993	A Woman's Guide to Adultery	Michael	3 episodes
1994	The Blue Boy	Joe Bonnar	TV movie
1994	Pleasure	Gustave Coudray	TV movie
1995	Cruel Train	Jack Dando	TV movie
1997	Melissa	Graeme Hepburn	5 episodes
1998	The Jump	Alan Cox	4 episodes
1998	The Officer from France	Wolfe Tone	TV movie
1999	Relative Strangers	Michael Docherty	2 episodes
2000	Tough Love	DCI Mike Love	2 episodes
2003	Murphy's Law	Mickey Munday	Episode: "Manic Munday"
2003	Murder in Mind	Tom Robbins	Episode: "Justice"
2003	Suspicion	Mark Finnegan	2 episodes
2005	Kidnapped	Alexander Balfour/Ebenezer Balfour	TV movie
2005	The Quatermass Experiment	Detective Lomax	TV movie
2005	Child of Mine	Alfie Palmer	TV movie
2007	The Whistleblowers	Chris Clayton	Episode: "Starters"
2008	Whistleblower	Florence Wycherley	2 episodes
2009	Ashes to Ashes	Martin Summers	8 episodes
2010	A Touch of Frost	Gerry Berland	Episodes: "If Dogs Run Free", Parts 1 & 2
2010	Mo	David Trimble	TV movie
2011	Silk	Joe Gillespie QC	Episode: "Three Sheets to the Wind"
2011	Death in Paradise	Aidan Miles	Episodes: "Music of Murder" and "Amongst Us"
2011–13	World's Most Dangerous Roads	Narrator	9 episodes
2012	Scott & Bailey	Det. Supt. Rick Wallis	Episode: "Pipe Dreams"
2012	Silent Witness	Sean Delaney	Episodes: "Fear", Parts 1 & 2
2012	The Life and Adventures of Nick Nickleby	Ralph Nickleby	5 episodes
2012–Present	Line of Duty	Supt. Ted Hastings	Seven series; 42 episodes
2013	Jo	Olivier Cattan	Episode: "Place Vendôme"
2014	Walter	DI Walter Gambon	TV movie
2014	A Touch of Cloth	Damien Vull	Episodes: "Too Cloth for Comfort", Parts 1 & 2
2016	The Hollow Crown	Plantagenet	Episodes: "Henry VI", Parts 1 & 2
2017	Broken	Father Peter Flaherty	6 episodes
2018-2020	Blood	Jim Hogan	6 episodes
2019	Red Nose Bodyguard	Policeman/Supt. Ted Hastings	Red Nose Day 2019 special
2021	The Attendant	The Attendant	Short film
2021	Adrian Dunbar's Coastal Ireland	Himself/presenter	Two-part series
2021	Inside No. 9	Himself	Series 6, episode 4: "Hurry Up and Wait"
2022–present	Ridley	Alex Ridley	ITV series
2022–present	Adrian Dunbar: My Ireland	Himself/presenter	Two-part series
2023	DNA Journey	Himself	With Neil Morrisey
