= Double Vision (1992 film) =

- Genre: Drama; Mystery; Thriller
- Based on: Double Vision by Mary Higgins Clark
- Screenplay by: Tony Grisoni
- Directed by: Robert Knights
- Starring: Kim Cattrall; Gale Hansen; Macha Méril; Naveen Andrews; Christopher Lee
- Music by: Graham Sacher
- Countries of origin: Canada; France; United Kingdom; Germany
- Original language: English

Production
- Executive producers: Jean-Pierre Cottet; Patrick Moine; Paul E. Painter
- Producer: Steve Walsh
- Cinematography: Bruno de Keyzer
- Editor: Chris Wimble
- Running time: 92 minutes
- Production companies: Caméras Continentales; Films A2; Gemini Film Productions; M6 Métropole Télévision; Telescene Film Group Productions

Original release
- Network: Canal+
- Release: December 2, 1992

Double Vision is a 1992 television film directed by Robert Knights. The film was based on the novel by Mary Higgins Clark.

== Plot ==
The telepathy between identical twins: conventional Caroline lives with her father and is engaged; Lisa is hard-drinking, devil-may-care, and lives in London as a high-class call girl. Caroline has horrid dreams of Lisa's untimely demise, so she flies to London to help. To find out what befell Lisa, Caroline submerges herself in Lisa's dangerous milieu, seeking help from an East Indian cabdriver who loved Lisa, and continuing to have dreams and visions. Then, while staying in Lisa's flat, wearing Lisa's clothes, and avoiding her own fiancé, who has followed her over from the States, Caroline follows her instincts to confront what did happen in her sister's last minutes of life.

== Cast ==
- Kim Cattrall as Caroline/Lisa
- Gale Hansen as Michael
- Macha Méril as Mrs. Perfect
- Naveen Andrews as Jimmy
- Christopher Lee as Mr. Bernard
- Shane Rimmer as Caroline and Lisa's father
- Barbara Windsor as Snow Queen boss
- Ciara Lavers as Young Caroline
- Andrea Lavers as Young Lisa
- Hakeem Kae-Kazim as Barman (as Hakeem Kae Kazim)
