= Sarah Lawson (producer) =

British film producer (1955–2008)

- Born: Sarah Jane Lawson; 7 October 1955; England
- Died: 8 November 2008 (aged 53); London, England
- Occupation: Film producer
- Years active: 1976–2008
- Spouses: Michael Grade (m. 1982; div. 1991) David Maher (m. 1992)
- Children: 2

Sarah Lawson (7 October 1955 – 8 November 2008) was an English film producer.

== Career ==
From 1982 to 1985, she was vice president of planning and development for DL Taffner Ltd, Los Angeles, and from 1995 to 1996 she was managing director of Anglia Television Entertainment Ltd – a joint venture between HBO and the ITV Company.

She is known for her work on The Dawning, starring Anthony Hopkins, Jean Simmons, Trevor Howard, Hugh Grant, Rebecca Pidgeon and Adrian Dunbar and several television films and series (such as Seekers, starring Academy Award winner Brenda Fricker, and Life After Life, written by Jonathan Lynn). She also founded a production company, Lawson Productions, through which she produced most of her projects. She took a hiatus in the late 1990s to start a family and pursue other non-producing media related activities. At the end of her life in 2008 she was working with Anne Chambers, author of the biography Granuaile: Ireland's Pirate Queen, on a film about Grace O'Malley. The project is slated for release in 2010, and is backed by the Irish Film Board.

Lawson also wrote and produced extensively for radio. She developed and executive produced the Baldi series, starring David Threlfall which aired its fifth season in 2008.

=== Lawson Productions ===
Lawson Productions was, from 1985 to 1988, with Taft Entertainment, known as the Taft Entertainment/Lawson Group. From 1988 it joined up with Universal Studios, with offices in London and Los Angeles. It became independent later in 1988, with its first project being Life After Life. It is now primarily based in London and Dublin.

== Personal life ==
Lawson was the daughter of Lt.-Col. Sir William Edward Harry Lawson, 5th Baron Burnham and Anne Petherick. Educated at Heathfield School in Ascot, Berkshire, she was a solicitor and a literary agent before becoming a film producer. From 1982 to 1991 she was married to Michael Grade, theatrical agent Anita Land introduced them. After their divorce she remarried, and had two children. Lawson was also a Governor at St. Patrick's Hospital, Dublin. During her hiatus from her media work, she spent time renovating the historic property Ardbraccan. She lived in Dublin and London.

Lawson died on 8 November 2008 after a long battle with cancer.

== Selected credits ==
=== Producer ===
Year	Film	Notes
2009	Untitled Grace O'Malley Project	Also co-writing with Anne Chambers.
2000	Baldi	BBC Radio series starring David Threlfall and Tina Kellegher.
1998	The Rope Trick	A short film for the BBC about the dangerous games a group of friends played when they were younger.
1997	The Man Who Made Husbands Jealous	Based on a book of the same name by Jilly Cooper, it starred Stephen Billington, Hugh Bonneville, and a then-unknown Rhona Mitra.
1993	The Only Way Out	A TV movie about a woman who endangers her almost ex-husband by engaging with a student sociopath. It starred John Ritter, Henry Winkler and Jewel Straite.
1992	Natural Lies	A short TV series starring Bob Peck and Shannon Duce, distributed by the BBC. The story involved an advertising executive investigating the death of his girlfriend, uncovering a conspiracy to hide the spread of BSE in humans.
1992	Seekers	A four-part mini-series about a police officer who disappears, and when his wife tries to find him, she discovers... another wife. They team up to search for him. It starred Brenda Fricker and Josette Simon, and was written by the celebrated novelist and screenwriter Lynda La Plante.
1990	Life After Life	A TV movie about a 70-year-old man (George Cole), who gets shunned into a retirement home. It also starred Leslie Phillips, and was written by Jonathan Lynn.
1990	An Adult Comedy	A TV series pilot starring Julianne Moore, based on the English TV series That's Love.
1988	The Dawning	A film about an IRA gunman on the run from the government. It starred Anthony Hopkins, Rebecca Pidgeon, Jean Simmons, Hugh Grant and Adrian Dunbar.
1988	That's Love	That's Love was a hit TV series that lasted for four years. It starred Derek Benfield, Tony Slatterly, Patsy Rowlands and featured Phyllida Law as 'Babs'.
1986	You Again?	You Again? was a popular TV series that ran for two years; it starred Jack Klugman and John Stamos.
1986	Murrow	Murrow was a TV movie about Edward Murrow, starring Daniel J. Travanti and Robert Vaughn. Lawson co-financed for the UK.

=== Writer ===
Year	Film	Notes
2009	Untitled Grace O'Malley Project	Co-writing with Anne Chambers. Also producing.
