= Robert Knights =

British film and television director (born 1942)

Robert Knights (born 1942 in England) is a British film and television director, perhaps best known for his film The Dawning, about the Irish War of Independence.

He has been nominated for three BAFTA TV Awards and he won the Montréal World Film Festival Jury Prize for The Dawning.

Also the International Emmy in New York for 'Porterhouse Blue' (Channel 4) starring David Jason (BAFTA Best Actor Award), and Christopher Gunning (BAFTA Best Music).

== Selected filmography and television credits ==
- The Glittering Prizes (1976)
- The History Man (1981)
- The Ebony Tower (1984)
- Porterhouse Blue (1987)
- The Dawning (1988)
- Double Vision (1992)
- The Man Who Made Husbands Jealous (1997)
- A Touch of Frost (1999–2000)
- Waking the Dead (2001)
- Monarch of the Glen (2002–2004)
- Casualty (2007–2008)
- The Bill (2002–2009)
