= List of Andie MacDowell performances =

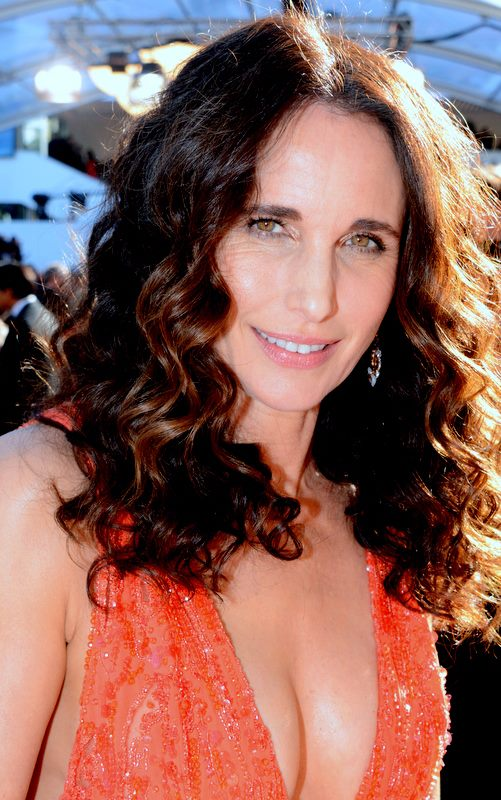
MacDowell in 2015 at the Cannes Film Festival

Andie MacDowell is an American actress. After starting her career as a model, she had her acting breakthrough in 1989. She then starred in a string of successful studio films. She has since expanded her career on television.

She made her film debut as Jane Porter in 1984's Greystoke: The Legend of Tarzan, Lord of the Apes. MacDowell received critical acclaim for her role in the 1989 independent drama Sex, Lies, and Videotape from Steven Soderbergh, for which she won Independent Spirit Award for Best Female Lead and was nominated for a Golden Globe Award for Best Actress – Motion Picture Drama. She also received Golden Globe Award nominations for her performances in Green Card (1990) and Four Weddings and a Funeral (1994).

Other notable performances from MacDowell include St. Elmo's Fire (1985), Groundhog Day (1993), Short Cuts (1993), Michael (1996), Multiplicity (1996), Footloose (2011), and Magic Mike XXL (2015). She received critical acclaim for the 2017 drama film Love After Love, and starred in the film Ready or Not (2019). Among her television work, MacDowell led the cast in the Hallmark Channel romance series Cedar Cove, which ran from 2013 to 2015, and since 2023 she costars in the channel's family drama series The Way Home.

== Filmography ==
Key
†	Denotes works that have not yet been released

=== Film ===
Year	Title	Role	Notes
1984	Greystoke: The Legend of Tarzan, Lord of the Apes	Miss Jane Porter	Voiced by Glenn Close
1985	St. Elmo's Fire	Dale Biberman	
1989	Sex, Lies, and Videotape	Ann Bishop Mullany	
1990	Green Card	Brontë Parrish	
1991	Hudson Hawk	Anna Baragli	
1991	The Object of Beauty	Tina Lesley Bartholemew	
1992	The Player	Herself	Cameo appearance
1993	Short Cuts	Ann Finnigan	
1993	Groundhog Day	Rita Hanson	
1993	Deception	Elizabeth "Bessie" Faro/Ruby Cairo	AKA Ruby Cairo
1994	Four Weddings and a Funeral	Carrie	
1994	Bad Girls	Eileen Spenser	
1995	Unstrung Heroes	Selma Lidz	
1996	Multiplicity	Laura Kinney	
1996	Michael	Dorothy Winters	
1997	The End of Violence	Page Max	
1998	Shadrach	Trixie Dabney	
1999	Just the Ticket	Linda Palinski	Also producer
1999	Muppets from Space	Shelley Snipes	
1999	The Muse	Laura Phillips	
2000	Harrison's Flowers	Sarah Lloyd	
2001	Town & Country	Eugenie Claybourne	Also producer (uncredited)
2001	Crush	Kate Scales	
2002	Ginostra	Jessie Benson	
2005	The Last Sign	Kathy MacFarlane	
2005	Beauty Shop	Terri	
2005	Tara Road	Marilyn Vine	
2006	Barnyard	Etta	Voice role
2007	Intervention	Kelly	
2008	Inconceivable	Lottie Louise Du Bose	
2009	The Six Wives of Henry Lefay	Kate	
2009	The 5th Quarter	Maryanne Abbate	
2010	As Good as Dead	Helen Kalahan	
2010	Happiness Runs	Victor's mother	
2010	Daydream Nation	Enid Goldberg	
2011	Monte Carlo	Pamela Bennett-Kelly	
2011	Footloose	Vi Moore	
2012	Mighty Fine	Stella Fine	
2013	Breaking at the Edge	Dr. Ghozland	
2015	Magic Mike XXL	Nancy Davidson	
2017	Love After Love	Suzanne	
2017	Only the Brave	Marvel Steinbrink	
2017	Christmas Inheritance	Debbie Collins	
2018	Paper Year	Joanne Winters	
2019	The Last Laugh	Doris Lovejoy	
2019	Ready or Not	Becky Le Domas	
2021	No Man's Land	Monica Greer	
2022	Along for the Ride	Victoria	
2022	Good Girl Jane	Ruth Rosen	
2023	My Happy Ending	Julia	
2023	The Other Zoey	Connie MacLaren	
2024	Red Right Hand	Queenpin Big Cat	
2024	Goodrich	Ann	
2024	A Sudden Case of Christmas	Rose	
2026	Guarding Stars	Connie Stapleton	
2027	Beach Read †	TBA	Filming

=== Television ===
Year	Title	Role	Notes
1988	The Secret of the Sahara	Anthea	Miniseries; 4 episodes
1989	Saturday Night Live	Herself (host)	Episode: "Andie MacDowell/Tracy Chapman"
1991	Women & Men 2: In Love There Are No Rules	Emily Meadows	TV movie
1997	Muppets Tonight	Herself	Episode: "Andie MacDowell"
2001	On the Edge	Lisa	TV movie segment: "Reaching Normal"
2001	Dinner with Friends	Karen	TV movie
2002	Jo	Jo	TV movie
2003	The Practice	Grace Chapman	Episode: "Les Is More"
2005	Riding the Bus with My Sister	Rachel Simon	TV movie
2008	The Prince of Motor City	Gertrude Hamilton	TV movie
2010	Lone Star	Alex	2 episodes (unaired)
2010	At Risk	Monique Lamont	TV movie
2010	The Front	Monique Lamont	TV movie
2012	30 Rock	Claire Williams	Episode: "Leap Day"
2012	Jane by Design	Gray Chandler Murray	Main role; 18 episodes
2013–2015	Cedar Cove	Olivia Lockhart	Main role; 36 episodes; Also executive producer
2017	Trial & Error	Margaret Henderson	Episode: "Chapter 13: The Verdict"
2017	RuPaul's Drag Race	Herself (guest judge)	Episode: "Gayest Ball Ever"
2017	At Home in Mitford	Cynthia Coppersmith	TV movie
2018	The Beach House	Lovie Rudland	TV movie; Also executive producer
2019	Cuckoo	Ivy Mittelfart	Main role (Series 5)
2019	One Red Nose Day and a Wedding	Carrie	TV short film
2019	Four Weddings and a Funeral	Mrs. Howard	Episode: "We Broke"
2020	Wireless	Elaine Braddock	8 episodes
2020	Dashing in December	Deb Burwall	TV movie; Also executive producer
2020	Dress-Up Gang	Herself	6 episodes
2021	Mr. Mayor	Herself	Episode: "Brentwood Trash"
2021	Maid	Paula Langley	Main role
2023	King Star King	Katrina	Voice; Episode: "King Star King!/!/!/"
2023–2026	The Way Home	Delilah "Del" Landry	Main role; Also executive producer
2024, 2025	The Kardashians	Herself	2 episodes
2026	The Right Side	Ruthie	Upcoming series
