= Gayest Ball Ever =

- RuPaul's Drag Race episode
- Episode no.: Season 9 Episode 11
- Presented by: RuPaul
- Original air date: June 2, 2017

Guest appearances
- Andie MacDowell; Joan Smalls

Episode chronology
← Previous "Makeovers: Crew Better Work"	Next → "Category Is"
- RuPaul's Drag Race season 9

"Gayest Ball Ever" is the eleventh episode of the ninth season of the American television series RuPaul's Drag Race. It originally aired on June 2, 2017, and was followed by an episode of the companion series RuPaul's Drag Race: Untucked. The main challenge tasks contestants with presenting three looks for The Gayest Ball Ever, a fashion show based on queer culture. Andie MacDowell and Joan Smalls are guest judges. Sasha Velour wins the episode's mini-challenge and Shea Couleé wins the main challenge. Alexis Michelle is eliminated from the competition, after placing in the bottom two and losing a lip-sync contest against Peppermint to "Macho Man" by Village People.

== Episode ==
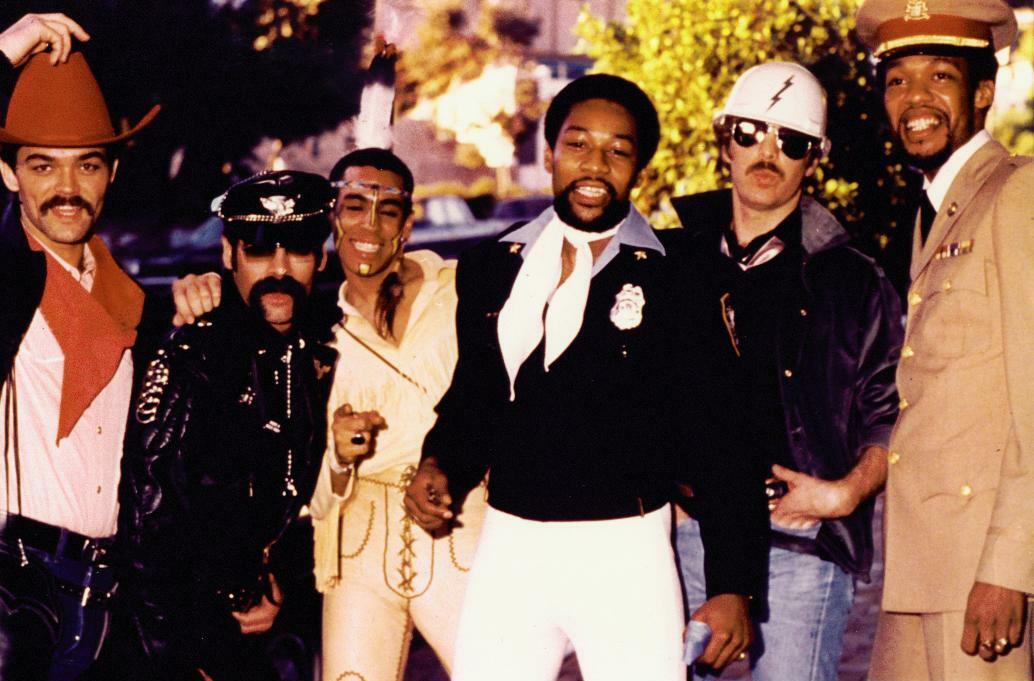
The episode's main challenge tasks contestants with designing original look inspired by the Village People. Pictured in 1978, from left: Randy Jones, Glenn Hughes, Felipe Rose, Victor Willis, David Hodo, and Alex Briley

The top five contestants returning to the Werk Room after the elimination of Nina Bo'nina Brown on the previous episode. On a new day, RuPaul greets the group and reveals the mini-challenge, which tasks contestants with poking fun at each other using puppets. The contestants have 20 minutes to "drag up" the puppets, which resemble the contestants. Shea Couleé, Sasha Velour, Trinity Taylor, and Alexis Michelle have puppets of Peppermint, Trinity Taylor, Shea Couleé, and Sasha Velour, respectively. RuPaul declares Sasha Velour is the winner of the mini-challenge and reveals the main challenge: to present three looks for The Gayest Ball Ever, a fashion show based on queer culture. The ball's categories are "Rainbow-She-Better-Do" (for rainbow flag-inspired looks), "Sexy Unicorn", and "Village People Eleganza Extravaganza", for which contestants will design original looks inspired by members of the American disco group Village People.

In the Werk Room, the contestants design their Village People-inspired looks, and RuPaul visits for status updates. Trinity Taylor bases her look on the police officer. Inspired by the leatherman, Peppermint's look pays tribute to the leather subculture. Alexis Michelle creates an outfit based on the Native American character, and Sasha Velour uses the cowboy for inspiration. Shea Couleé constructs a look based on the construction worker. RuPaul reveals the contestants will also perform a number based on rhythmic gymnastics. RuPaul tasks Sasha Velour with overseeing choreography for the performance because she won the mini-challenge. The contestants rehearse on the main stage, then return to the Werk Room to make final preparations for the runway.

On the main stage, RuPaul welcomes fellow judges Michelle Visage and Carson Kressley, as well as guest judges Andie MacDowell and Joan Smalls. The contestants perform the gymnastics routine. The judges deliver critiques, then RuPaul asks the contestants to share who they think should be eliminated from the competition and why. Sasha Velour and Shea Couleé receive positive critiques, and Shea Couleé wins the challenge. Alexis Michelle, Peppermint, and Trinity Taylor receive negative critiques, and Trinity Taylor is deemed safe. Alexis Michelle and Peppermint place in the bottom and face off in a lip-sync to "Macho Man" (1978) by Village People. Peppermint wins the lip-sync and Alexis Michelle is eliminated from the competition.

== Production and broadcast ==
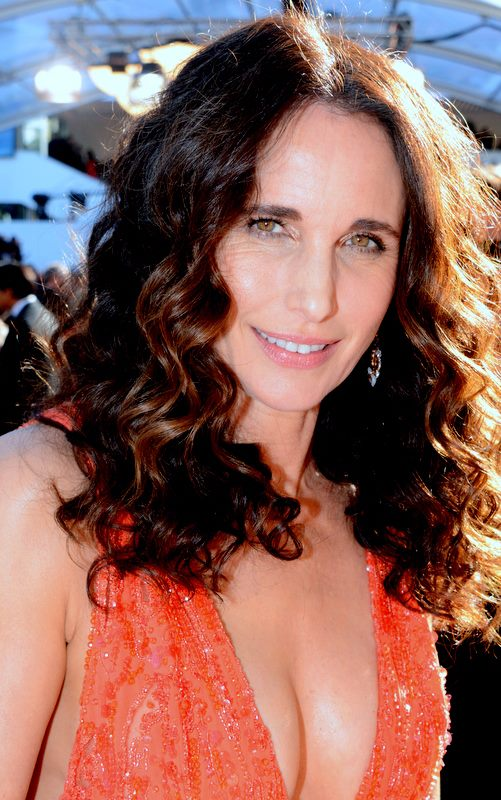
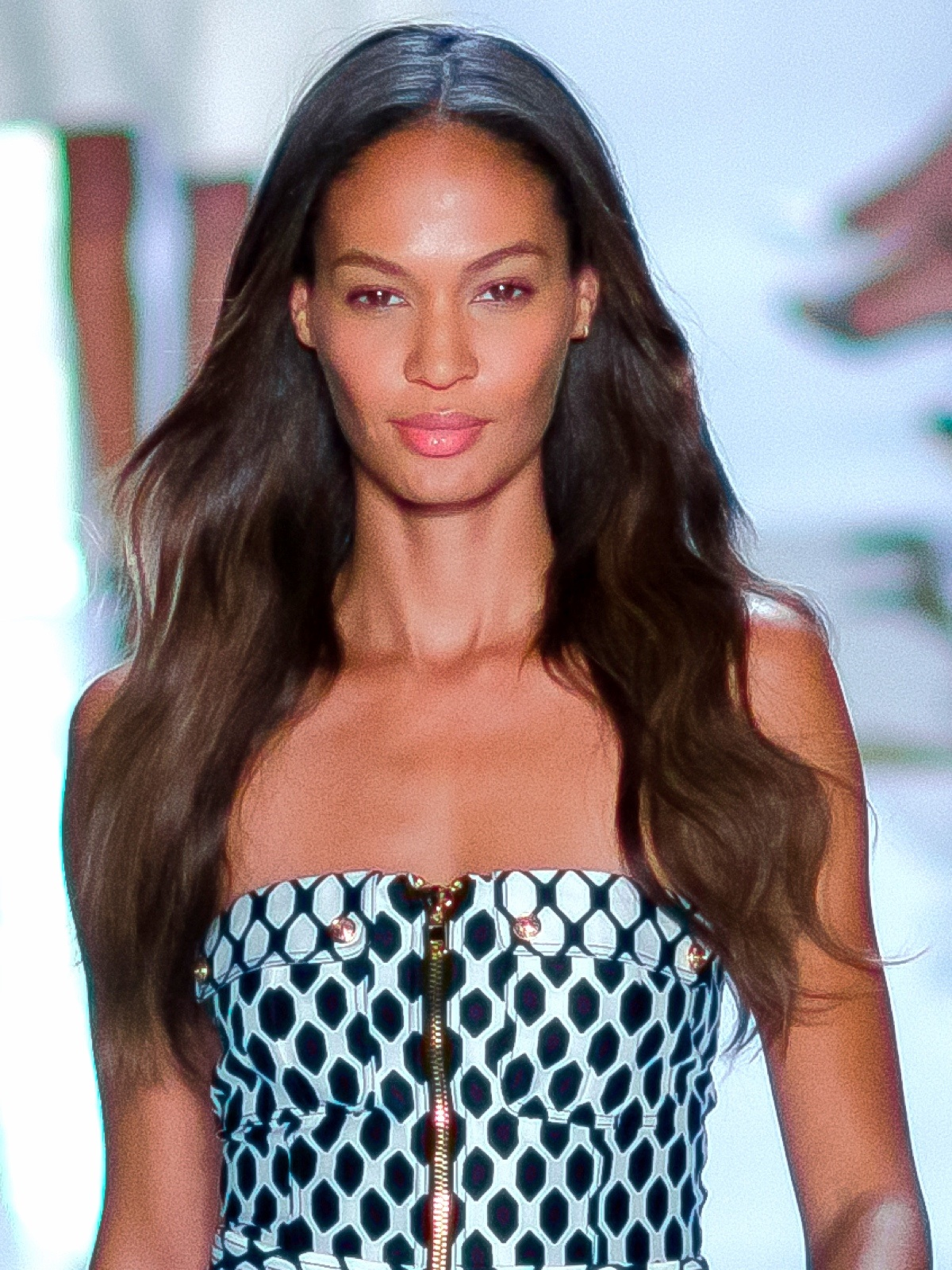
Andie MacDowell (left) and Joan Smalls (right) are guest judges.

The episode originally aired on June 2, 2017.

=== Fashion ===
For "Rainbow-She-Better-Do", Shea Couleé wears a graffiti-inspired dress. Sasha Velour utilizes color-blocking for her look. Trinity Taylor's outfit has lots of straps. For "Sexy Unicorn", Shea Couleé presents a black outfit. Sasha Velour's look is inspired by tapestry from the Middle Ages. Alexis Michelle's look is gold and glittered. Trinity Taylor says her purple outfit is inspired by the My Little Pony franchise, and Peppermint presents a "space unicorn" pink outfit.

For "Village People Eleganza Extravaganza", Shea Couleé presents a deconstructed flannel cape. Sasha Velour wears an outfit made from red kerchiefs. Alexis Michelle wears turquoise stones and a bow headpiece. Trinity Taylors's police officer-inspired look includes a visor, and Peppermint has leather accessories.

== Reception ==
Oliver Sava of The A.V. Club gave the episode a rating of 'B-'. David Levesley of British GQ said the "Macho Man" performance "feels, to me, like the reason Drag Race is great: Peppermint, the first trans woman to openly identify as such while competing on the show (some contestants entered and hid their transitions, others transitioned after), dressed as a sort of fetish biker, storms the stage in a performance of a song that is simultaneously a paean to and a parody of masculinity. It truly feels like the sort of thing that could only happen on a proudly queer reality show, despite all the controversies the show continues to weather considering its dubious record on trans representation and its complex relationship with race." Sam Brooks ranked "Macho Man" number 105 in The Spinoff's 2019 "definite ranking" of the show's 162 lip-syncs to date.

== See also ==
- List of Andie MacDowell performances
