= Riding the Bus with My Sister (book) =

2002 memoir by Rachel Simon

- First edition
- Author: Rachel Simon
- Language: English
- Publisher: Houghton Mifflin (first edition); Grand Central Publishing (2013 edition)
- Publication date: August 26, 2002
- Pages: 304 (first edition)
- ISBN: 978-0-618-04599-0

Riding the Bus with My Sister is a 2002 memoir by American author Rachel Simon that follows her year riding buses in a Pennsylvania city with her mentally handicapped sister, Beth. Chapters alternate between Beth and Rachel's year together and flashback memory chapters of their family's history.

Beth begins riding the buses in October 1993 for reasons she cannot remember. Bus drivers are divided over Beth, with some defending her and others attacking her over her lack of a job and how she requires additional attention as a rider. Rachel begins the memoir unhappy over her work and personal life, though she ends up as a bride to the boyfriend she remembers leaving in panic after he asked her to marry him.

Riding the Bus with My Sister originated after Rachel's editor at The Philadelphia Inquirer suggested she spend a day with her sister riding buses and write an article about it; after it was re-published across the United States, Beth dared her to ride buses with her for an entire year. At the time of the book's release, Rachel worked as a creative writing professor at Bryn Mawr College. The memoir received positive reviews upon release, and was made into a television film adaption starring Rosie O'Donnell as Beth. In 2013, Grand Central Publishing re-released the book with a new afterword.

== Author and background ==
Rachel Simon (born 1959) is an American author who, at the time of the book's first publication, worked as a creative writing professor at Bryn Mawr College. She graduated from the college in 1981, where she studied anthropology, and afterwards worked as a paralegal, events coordinator for Barnes & Noble, private tutor, and wrote freelance articles for The Philadelphia Inquirer. Prior to publication, Simon authored books including Little Nightmares, Little Dreams (1990), The Magic Touch (1994), and The Writer's Survival Guide (1997).

Simon stated inspiration for the memoir originated from a conversation between herself and an editor at The Philadelphia Inquirer after Simon told him she had to see Beth for the holidays and work around her bus schedule. He encouraged Rachel to ride with her and write an article about the experience. The article "was a big hit and soon appeared around the country". Beth then dared Rachel to ride the buses with her for an entire year, which formed the basis of the book.

Houghton Mifflin published the first edition of Riding the Bus with My Sister in 2002, while Grand Central Publishing published a 2013 edition with a new foreword and afterword.

== Synopsis ==
Chapters alternate between Beth and Rachel's year together and flashback memory chapters, in italics, of their family's history.

=== Present chapters ===
Beth Simon is a mentally handicapped woman in her late 30s who lives in a city in Pennsylvania and enjoys riding buses. Beth begins riding the buses in October 1993 for reasons she cannot remember. Beth's boyfriend, Jesse, is a mentally handicapped African-American man. Rachel Simon, her sister, is generally unhappy with her work and personal life, and moves out of her former boyfriend's house in a panic after he asks to marry her. Rachel has not visited her sister in a few years, though Beth writes her letters, which fills Rachel with joy.

After writing the piece in The Philadelphia Inquirer, Beth invites Rachel to her yearly "Plan of Care" review, and she attends. In the meeting, Beth states she does not want to join an organization or get a job. Her social workers are exasperated by her stubbornness. Beth then asks Rachel to ride the buses with her for a year, and she agrees. She has street smarts; for instance, she knows misfits on the street (such as anyone appearing homeless), but does not talk to a man with a sallow face who offers her a photo book with Tweety on the cover, calling him creepy.

Bus drivers are divided over Beth, with some defending her and others attacking her over her lack of a job and how she requires additional attention as a rider. Ten years ago, after Beth mentions how she is sexually active with Jesse, Rachel initiates a conversation with her which prompts Beth, after a recommendation from her mother, to undergo a tubal ligation to prevent an unwanted pregnancy.

Rachel tries to get Beth a job working with the buses, but the job is unionized and the only available work is full-time, which Beth does not want. At a bus shelter, Beth stands up to two women (likely mother and daughter) being racist, telling them not to talk like that. Beth gets surgery to address her eyelashes, which were growing into her eyes, though she playfully said she would run away from the hospital. Olivia, her caseworker, later says she would have allowed her to run away had she been there.

Now in December, Rachel tells Beth she hates her, but apologizes later. After her next Plan of Care meeting, where she again says she does not want to join an organization or get a job, Beth announces the year is over and Rachel no longer rides with her. The memoir ends with a "Year and a Half Later" afterword where Rachel becomes a bride to her former boyfriend she left in a panic.

=== Flashback chapters ===
Though doctors tell the sisters' father they do not know what caused Beth's mental handicap, during her birth, doctors used forceps and later said they squeezed her head. Rachel's father, now dean of a college, leaves her mother, a librarian at his college, for a woman professor and the couple separates. Her mother marries a violent ex-con, going on a honeymoon and taking Beth. After riding buses in the American Southwest for "whole days" with her mother and her mother's new husband, Beth is put on a flight after he holds her at gunpoint, and she returns to their father. Their mother leaves him and returns to Pennsylvania to work as a librarian, though she does not reach out to their father or her family.

On the advice of a therapist, Rachel calls and forgives her mother. Their father puts Beth in a group home due to her consistent poor behavior. Later, she moves into her own apartment.

=== 2013 edition ===
The 2013 edition contains a new foreword which explains why her use of the term mental retardation was not changed in the updated book (so as to root the issues and themes of the book in their sociological context of the time). Simon wrote the afterword, entitled "Ten Years Later", in four parts, in which Simon gets the reader "caught up on their lives as well as providing a cogent review of the most pertinent aspects of the rules and regulations addressing the needs of persons with [intellectual disabilities]".

== Reception ==
After riding with her a long time I came to see her as an artist. She's sculpted a life out of material most people didn't realize existed. Bus timetables and the world of the buses. I came to think of it as quite ingenious.

— Rachel on Beth's riding the buses

The memoir received positive reviews upon release. Freelance writer David McDonough called Riding the Bus with My Sister a "diary, a biography, an autobiography, an adventure tale and a love story". In The Arizona Republic, Anne Stephenson observed how Rachel was originally uncomfortable with Beth, which granted the reader consent to be uncomfortable as well. Beth Gillin of The Philadelphia Inquirer noted the contrasts between Rachel and Beth, where Rachel lacked a date and a social life but Beth had a lover and friends in the bus drivers. She summarized that "Simon ponders, but does not solve, the mystery of how much of Beth is her unique personality and how much her condition".

Simon's honest writing, and her frustration with Beth, were a common observation amongst critics. Kirkus Reviews stated the author did not come off as sermonic, citing a passage which surmised her frustrations with her sister's non-stop babble on the buses over a long period of time. In The Women's Review of Books, Heather Hewett, who grew up with a sister who had Down syndrome, called Rachel unceasingly honest in the book, which lends to her believability. Publishers Weekly said she was "honest about the frustrations of relating to her stubborn sister". Both Hewett and Kirkus used the term graceful to describe the writing.

Judith Long of Newsday called Beth hardheaded and self-absorbed, though she was Rachel's true teacher. Publishers Weekly said Rachel had a lot to learn from her sister about happiness, love, and life. In School Library Journal, Peggy Bercher of the Fairfax County Public Library observed the author evolved to see Beth as her own person with strong beliefs about how she wants to live her life, regardless of others' opinions. Hewett, though, observed Simon's "difficulty is [forging] an equal relationship with her sister when she has always been required to play the 'ambiguous role of parent and sibling'".

Kirkus cites the bus drivers as the real heroes of the book, as they provide human connections to Beth missing from her family. Mandy Davis of the St. Louis Post-Dispatch stated "anyone who reads this book will come away with a real respect for people with mental retardation, and the families who love and cherish them". In Rehabilitation Research, Policy, and Education, Gina Bonoan recommended the book to those interested in the lives of those with intellectual disabilities from the point of view of a family member.

Writing a review of the 2013 edition in Journal of Religion, Disability & Health, Donald E. Healy Jr., emeritus of special education at Western Illinois University Quad Cities, said "Simon's archetypal titles and descriptions of Beth's favorite drivers (e.g., The Jester, The Dreamer, The Earth Mother) gives parts of the narrative a quality near [The] Canterbury Tales, and the image of the pilgrim, whether as driver or passenger, is often evoked". He described the family history sections as told gently and frankly. McDonough stated the flashbacks made the story immediate. In criticism, Hewett stated from time to time, her "language feels too clever for the underlying seriousness of her material".

== Analysis ==
In the Journal of Contemporary Ethnography, G. Thomas Couser analyzes the book as a part of disability ethnography. He described the memoir as relational life writing, in that the personal narrative deals with an already existing relationship between the author and someone else. Unlike other instances of relational writing, however, Couser observes Riding the Bus with My Sister "did not grow out of everyday contact and the preexisting familiarity between subject and writer [...] but rather the result of a deliberate decision on the part of the writer to devote a good deal of her time and energy to sharing, investigating, and documenting an aspect of her sister's life that would otherwise have remained opaque to her".

He called the book not distinctly any of the three styles of autoethnography (native, because the author is not mentally handicapped; ethnographic autobiography, because the author fails to be the main subject; or autobiographical ethnography, as the author fails to be an anthropologist). On the other hand, Couser cites the book as an example of confessional autoethnography, as "as Beth's sister, Simon cannot approach her dispassionately and objectively". After examining privacy issues, including the ethical issues of publishing a mentally handicapped woman's sex life, he states the book is an ethnography insofar as Rachel enters Beth's life with the goal of understanding it on a cultural and social level. Couser concludes the book "occupies the intersection of the various streams of discourse that Reed-Danahay (1997) designates with the elastic term autoethnography".

Hewett noted the book added to a list of media on developmental disability including Margaret Moorman's memoir My Sister's Keeper (1992), the film What's Eating Gilbert Grape (1993), Don Myers's collection Views from Our Shoes (1997), and Mary McHugh's nonfiction book Special Siblings (1999).

== Film adaptation ==
In 2005, the book was adapted into a Hallmark Hall of Fame television film for CBS under the same name, directed by Anjelica Huston; Andie MacDowell plays Rachel, while Rosie O'Donnell plays Beth. O'Donnell bought the film rights to the book and Joyce Eliason wrote the screenplay. Though the film received mostly negative reviews from critics, Simon praised the adaptation as "poignant, moving, and powerful".
