= The Unsaid =

2001 film

- DVD cover
- Directed by: Tom McLoughlin
- Screenplay by: Miguel Tejada-Flores; Scott Williams
- Story by: Christopher Murphey
- Starring: Andy García; Vincent Kartheiser; Linda Cardellini
- Cinematography: Lloyd Ahern II
- Edited by: Charles Bornstein
- Music by: Don Davis
- Production companies: Minds Eye Entertainment; New Legend Media
- Distributed by: Universal Studios Home Video
- Release date: July 24, 2001
- Running time: 111 minutes
- Country: United States
- Language: English
- Budget: $22 million
- Box office: $2.1 million

The Unsaid is a 2001 American psychological thriller film directed by Tom McLoughlin and starring Andy García that was released in 2001. It is also known under the name The Ties That Bind and its working title Sins of the Father. The film was released straight to DVD in the US, UK, and Canada but premiered in theaters in other parts of Europe and Asia.

The film follows Michael Hunter's (García) struggle to cope with his son's suicide and his attempt to rehabilitate Thomas Caffey (Vincent Kartheiser), who reminds him of his own son.

== Plot ==
Psychiatrist Michael Hunter and his wife are watching their daughter Shelly's school play. Their son Kyle, who is suffering from depression, stays at home because he says he cannot stand being among people. While the parents are applauding Shelly, Kyle commits suicide in the family's garage using the exhaust from a car.

Several years later the family has fallen apart because of their loss. Michael retreats, writes books, holds speeches for University students, but no longer treats patients. When his former student, Barbara Wagner, approaches him asking for help with a case he initially refuses, but then gives in to taking over the case of 17-year-old Thomas "Tommy" Caffey, who witnessed his father murdering his mother and repressed the memories. The teenager will be allowed to leave the psychiatric facility in a few weeks, when he turns 18. But, while working with Tommy, Michael realizes how much the boy reminds him of his own son Kyle and feelings of guilt arise in the psychologist.

In flashbacks and conversations, the viewer receives background information of Kyle's suicide. Michael had his son see a therapist — an old university friend named Harry Quinlan — instead of taking medication, as his wife would have wanted. In his son's suicide letter, Michael finds out that Kyle was sexually abused by Quinlan. When Michael tries to confront Quinlan, he refused to unlock the front door. Michael goes to the glass back door, through which he sees Quinlan pull a gun out of a drawer. As Quinlan places the barrel in his mouth, Michael angrily yells at him to shoot himself, which the therapist does.

Tommy punches Chloe, a girl on ecstasy, at a party because she tried to force him to have sex. At the same party, Tommy befriends Shelly and they become closer. Shelly tells Tommy about Kyle. From then on, Tommy uses the information in therapy sessions and manipulates Michael, who more and more sees his own son in him. The next day it's reported on TV that Chloe has been murdered.

When Michael visits Tommy's father in prison he finds out that Tommy's mother raped Tommy regularly, even making him skipping school. This is the reason why his father, who came home early one day, bludgeoned her to death, and why Tommy reacts violently when women try to have physical contact with him. However, Mr. Caffey had always said it was because he found out his wife had a lover. He tells Michael he'll deny it if Michael tries to tell anyone.

Tommy attempts to make Barbara release him to an independent life immediately. When she refuses and touches him, he pushes her through a glass window. After she crawls to a telephone and attempts to call police, Tommy beats her with the handset. He flees in a car stolen from Troy and, armed with a handgun, picks up Shelly from her mother's house and speeds away. Michael finds the severely wounded Barbara in her apartment. Just before being placed in the ambulance, Barbara warns Michael about Tommy's plan. Michael races to his ex-wife's house, narrowly missing the boy and Shelly, whom he chases. The boy's flight comes to an end near train tracks, where he holds Shelly at gunpoint. Michael confronts Tommy with what his mother did and he tearfully surrenders the girl and the gun. When a train approaches, Tommy tears loose from Michael's embrace and runs onto the tracks. At the last second, Tommy stops on the tracks, throws up his arms, and awaits impact. Michael grabs Tommy and they fall away from the locomotive.

In the closing scene, Michael and Tommy light-heartedly play handball at a mental institution.

== Cast ==
- Andy García as Michael Hunter
- Vincent Kartheiser as Thomas "Tommy" Caffey
- Trevor Blumas as Kyle Hunter
- Linda Cardellini as Shelly Hunter
- Sam Bottoms as Mr. Joseph Caffey
- August Schellenberg as Det. Hannah
- Chelsea Field as Penny Hunter
- Brendan Fletcher as Troy Pasternak
- Teri Polo as Barbara Wagner

== Awards ==
- International Film Festival of Marrakech, 2001
- Won Audience Award - Tom McLoughlin
- Nominated Golden Star - Tom McLoughlin
