= The Wronged Man =

- Genre: Drama
- Based on: "The Wronged Man" by Andrew Corsello
- Written by: Teena Booth
- Directed by: Tom McLoughlin
- Starring: Julia Ormond; Mahershalalhashbaz Ali
- Music by: Stephen Endelman
- Country of origin: United States
- Original language: English

Production
- Executive producer: Gale Anne Hurd
- Producer: Robert J. Wilson
- Cinematography: Shelly Johnson
- Editor: Charles Bornstein
- Running time: 85 minutes
- Production companies: Valhalla Motion Pictures; Sony Pictures Television

Original release
- Network: Lifetime Movie Network
- Release: January 17, 2010

The Wronged Man is a 2010 American drama television film directed by Tom McLoughlin and starring Julia Ormond and Mahershalalhashbaz Ali. Gale Anne Hurd served as an executive producer.

== Cast ==
- Julia Ormond as Janet "Prissy" Gregory
- Mahershalalhashbaz Ali as Calvin Willis
- Lisa Arrindell Anderson as Michelle Willis
- Bruce McKinnon as Randy Arthur
- Omar J. Dorsey as Leroy Matthews
- Rhoda Griffis as Tina
- Tonea Stewart as Ms. Newton
- Lucius Baston as Shelton
- Kendrick Cross as David
- Russ Comegys as Wayne

== Production ==
The film is based on the article "The Wronged Man" by Andrew Corsello, which appeared in the November 2004 issue of GQ. Filming took place in Atlanta.
