= Tom McLoughlin =

American film director

- Born: Thomas Maurice McLoughlin; July 19, 1950 (age 75); Los Angeles, California, U.S.
- Occupations: Director; screenwriter
- Years active: 1979–present
- Spouse: Nancy McLoughlin (m. 1983)
- Children: 2

Thomas Maurice McLoughlin is an American screenwriter, film/television director and former mime who is most notable for directing Friday the 13th Part VI: Jason Lives and One Dark Night. His other credits include numerous television films such as Murder in Greenwich, At Risk, Cyber Seduction: His Secret Life, Date with an Angel and the 2010 Lifetime Movie Network film The Wronged Man.

In 1977, McLoughlin was nominated for the Emmy Award for Outstanding Writing for a Variety, Music or Comedy Program for his contributions to Van Dyke and Company, a special starring Dick Van Dyke. Two years later, he portrayed the robot S.T.A.R. (Special Troops/Arms Regiment) in the Disney film The Black Hole. He also played (along with Kevin Peter Hall) Katahdin, the mutated bear in the 1979 horror film Prophecy.

== Filmography ==
=== Film ===
Year	Title	Director	Writer	Producer	Ref.
1983	One Dark Night	Yes	Yes	No	
1986	Friday the 13th Part VI: Jason Lives	Yes	Yes	No	
1987	Date with an Angel	Yes	Yes	No	
1997	FairyTale: A True Story	No	Yes	Yes	
2001	The Unsaid	Yes	No	No	

=== Television ===
Year	Title	Creator	Director	Writer
1986–87	Amazing Stories	No	No	Yes
1988	Freddy's Nightmares	No	Yes	No
1988–89	Friday the 13th: The Series	No	Yes	Yes
1990–91	They Came from Outer Space	Yes	No	Yes
1990–91	She-Wolf of London	Yes	No	Yes
1991	Sometimes They Come Back	No	Yes	No

TV movies

- Steven Banks: Home Entertainment Center (1989)
- The Steven Banks Show (1991)
- In A Child's Name (Television Mini-series) (1991)
- Sometimes They Come Back (1991)
- Something to Live for: The Alison Gertz Story (1992)
- Murder of Innocence (1993)
- The Yarn Princess (1994)
- Leave of Absence (1994)
- Take Me Home Again (1994)
- The Haunting of Helen Walker (1995)
- Journey (1995)
- A Different Kind of Christmas (1996)
- The Third Twin (1997)
- Behind the Mask (1999)
- Anya's Bell (1999)
- The Unsaid (2001)
- Murder in Greenwich (2002)
- Fiona (2002)
- D.C. Sniper: 23 Days of Fear (2003)
- She's Too Young (2004)
- A Very Married Christmas (2004)
- Odd Girl Out (2005)
- Cyber Seduction: His Secret Life (2005)
- Not Like Everyone Else (2006)
- The Staircase Murders (2007)
- Fab Five: The Texas Cheerleader Scandal (2008)
- The Wronged Man (2010)
- At Risk (2010)
- The Front (2010)

Acting role

Year	Title	Role
1979	The Black Hole	Captain S.T.A.R.
1985	Alice in Wonderland	The Jabberwocky
2009	His Name Was Jason: 30 Years of Friday the 13th	Himself
2013	Crystal Lake Memories: The Complete History of Friday the 13th	Himself
