= Cyber Seduction: His Secret Life =

2005 television drama film

- Film poster
- Genre: Psychological drama
- Teleplay by: Wesley Bishop; Richard Kletter
- Story by: Wesley Bishop
- Directed by: Tom McLoughlin
- Starring: Jeremy Sumpter; Lyndsy Fonseca; John Robinson; Jake Scott; Kelly Lynch
- Music by: Louis Febre
- Country of origin: United States
- Original language: English

Production
- Executive producer: Howard Braunstein
- Cinematography: Rudolf Blahacek
- Editor: Charles Bornstein
- Running time: 87 minutes
- Production companies: Lifetime Movie Network; Dotcom Films

Original release
- Network: Lifetime
- Release: June 20, 2005

Cyber Seduction: His Secret Life is a 2005 American psychological drama television film about a teenage boy whose life goes downhill after he develops an addiction to internet pornography. The film was directed by Tom McLoughlin, and stars Jeremy Sumpter in the main role, with co-actors including Kelly Lynch, Jake Scott, and Lyndsy Fonseca. It first aired on the Lifetime channel on June 20, 2005, and received no notable critical reviews initially, but in the 2010s became considered a stereotypical example of Lifetime original films after renewed attention to the title, and it received an unexpected cult following.

== Plot ==
Justin Petersen is a high school sophomore and a member of his school's swim team. He hopes his performance on the team will award him a scholarship. His mother, Diane, was also a member of her high school's swim team. Justin is a virgin, but he has a girlfriend, Amy, a devout Christian who wants Justin to remain chaste until marriage. However, another girl named Monica repeatedly flirts with Justin, but he ignores her.

At his home, Justin receives a direct message from Timmy, a classmate of his who sends him a link to Monica's website that has sexual images of her. Justin later receives another direct message with a link to a pornographic website titled "big-breasted women." Justin stays up all night to browse it, consuming energy drinks to keep himself awake. Diane catches him browsing the website and, in horror, asks her husband, Steven, to tell Justin about sex and female respect. However, Steven believes Justin's behavior is normal. The subject matter confuses Justin, who makes increased efforts to hide his downloaded porn.

Justin's addiction makes him less focused during swimming practice and more obsessed with Monica. He discreetly watches porn on Amy's PDA. Alex, Justin's younger brother, sees Justin looking at porn and promises to not tell Diane about it. Alex later shows porn to another classmate of his, Thomas. Justin shows Timmy a BDSM site, and, to Justin's surprise, Timmy negatively responds to it. He also watches Diane swim in the swimming pool and fantasizes about her sexually, despite her being his mother.

Justin finishes a race in third place in a significant swim meet, disappointing his family. Alex emails himself sexual images and burns CDs of porn, and Diane finds his CD named "Virgin Vaginas" and is disturbed. Diane asks Justin about the CD; he says his classmates are sending pornographic images to him as a joke, and Alex claims he accidentally found it on his computer. Diane disbelieves the statement, but Steven believes it.

Justin messages Monica, asking if they can meet up. After lying to his parents about going to Amy's house for homework help, Justin meets Monica at a diner, where they have an awkward conversation, ending their meetup abruptly. By the next morning, Diane moves Justin's computer to the family room after she finds out he was not at Amy's house.

At her house, Justin attempts to have sex with Amy, but she refuses, and Justin leaves angrily. Diane gets a call from Thomas' mother, saying that Thomas, Alex's friend, was showing a pornographic image on his laptop at school to others, and Alex was the one who sent it. Diane blames Justin for allowing pornography in their home and disables internet access.

Amy shows her PDA's history to Justin during a swim team meeting and gets furious with him. In the school's library, Justin hacks a computer to access a porn website, gets caught, and is consequently placed on probation. His parents find out his school grades are poor and that the swim team has suspended him. Justin's parents ground him for the rest of the semester. That night, Justin has trouble sleeping and uses Diane's credit card to buy internet access and pornography.

The next day, Justin attempts to have sex with Monica. She insists on having sex on a bed that appears to belong to her grandparents, with pictures of them on a wall. Terrified at the prospect of real sex, Justin decides to not have sex with Monica. He flees the house as she becomes extremely upset and has a mental health crisis. She violently hits her head against the bathroom counter.

At Justin's house, the family computer has a virus, and his parents find out about their credit card activity. Justin physically fights with his parents. Justin realizes he must apologize to Amy, and Diane lets him. He apologizes and asks if they can get back together (they presumably broke up after she showed her PDA's history to him). Amy declines and Justin tells her he will start going to church. They decide to remain as friends.

A gang later attacks and kidnaps Justin. The gang members are Timmy and Dooley, Monica's boyfriend. Dooley and Timmy were with Monica at a diner and had abandoned her after someone told them Justin was nearby. Dooley beats up Justin because he touched Monica and blames him for her injury. They dump Justin in an alley. Justin later breaks into his school's swimming pool and attempts suicide by drowning himself. He thinks about his life before his porn addiction and decides to rise from the water. The film ends with Justin swimming across the pool while smiling.

== Cast ==
- Jeremy Sumpter as Justin Petersen
- Kelly Lynch as Diane Petersen
- Jake Scott as Alex Petersen
- John Robinson as Steven Petersen
- Lyndsy Fonseca as Amy Hewitt
- Nicole Dicker as Monica
- Kyle Schmid as Timmy
- James A. Woods as Dooley
- Briony Glassco as Beth
- Benz Antoine as Coach Suha

== Reception ==
Critics noted how absurd Justin's addiction to pornography is. Justin views pornography every chance he gets, including sending himself sexual images on Amy's palm pilot in public.

Cyber Seduction: His Secret Life received a cult following after its release, due to its poor quality and shoddy production. Yvette Del Rio of Movies of Our Lifetime rated the film 10/10 because she found it unintentionally comedic; she noted elements such as Justin's internet username being "Stroke Man" and called the film "one of those Lifetime Classics, up there with Mother May I Sleep With Danger?." The A.V. Club added the film to its list of best introductory Lifetime movies to watch, stating, "this is the kind of movie designed to make worried moms search their sons’ web histories, and those sons giggle because seriously, who has a PDA anymore?". USA Today added the film to a list of Lifetime movies beloved to "hate-watch", mockingly saying of it, "OF COURSE the best freestyle swimmer in the whole state has a porn addiction! And OF COURSE it leads him down a path of betrayal, violent attacks, depression and probation! What better, more realistic plot to a story is there?!" Mustafa Gatollari of Distractify considered Cyber Seduction: His Secret Life a classic example of "ridiculously bad" Lifetime movies, noting it for its unintentional humor.
