= Rachel Simon =

American author

- Born: 1959 (age 66–67); Newark, New Jersey, U.S.
- Occupation: Author
- Writing career
- Genres: Fiction; non-fiction
- Website: www.rachelsimon.com

Rachel Simon (born 1959 in Newark, New Jersey) is an American author of both fiction and non-fiction. Her six books include the 2011 novel The Story of Beautiful Girl, and the 2002 memoir Riding the Bus with My Sister. Her work has been adapted for film, television, radio, and stage.

Riding the Bus with My Sister, a memoir about a year Simon spent with her developmentally disabled sister Beth, was adapted as the 2005 Hallmark Hall of Fame TV film Riding the Bus with My Sister, which starred Andie MacDowell as Simon and Rosie O'Donnell as Beth. The film was directed by Anjelica Huston.

== Bibliography ==
- Little Nightmares, Little Dreams (1990) (ISBN 0-89919-952-6) (short story collection)
- The Magic Touch (1994) (ISBN 0-670-85262-7) (novel)
- The Writer's Survival Guide (1997) (ISBN 1-884910-23-8)
- Riding the Bus with My Sister (2002) (ISBN 0-452-28455-4)
- Building A Home With My Husband: A Journey Through The Renovation of Love (2009) (ISBN 978-0-525-95120-9)
  - Published in paperback in 2010 as The House On Teacher's Lane: A Memoir of Home, Healing, And Love's Hardest Questions (ISBN 978-0-452-29618-3)
- The Story Of Beautiful Girl (May 2011) (ISBN 978-0-446-57446-4)
