= Category Is =

- RuPaul's Drag Race episode
- Episode no.: Season 9 Episode 12
- Presented by: RuPaul
- Original air date: June 9, 2017

Guest appearance
- Todrick Hall

Episode chronology
← Previous "Gayest Ball Ever"	Next → "Reunited"

"Category Is" is the eleventh episode of the ninth season of the American television series RuPaul's Drag Race. It originally aired on June 9, 2017. The episode's main challenge tasks the remaining four contestants—Peppermint, Sasha Velour, Shea Couleé, and Trinity Taylor—with writing, recording, and performing choreography to original verses for a new version of RuPaul's song "Category Is". The contestants record with Todrick Hall, who also offers choreography coaching, and have individual interviews with RuPaul and Michelle Visage for the podcast RuPaul: What's the Tee? Carson Kressley and Ross Mathews join RuPaul and Visage on the judging panel. No contestants are eliminated from the competition on the episode.

== Episode ==
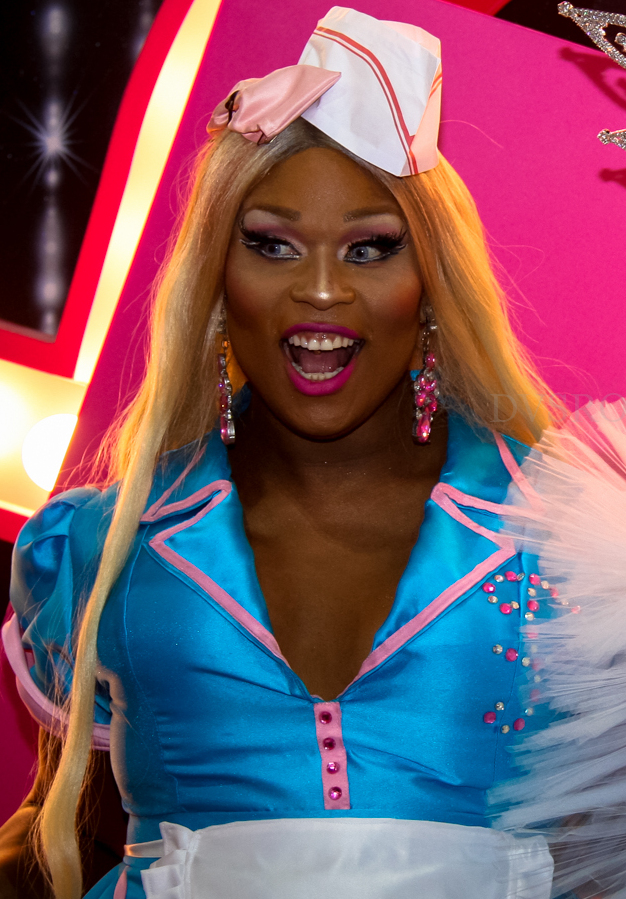
Peppermint

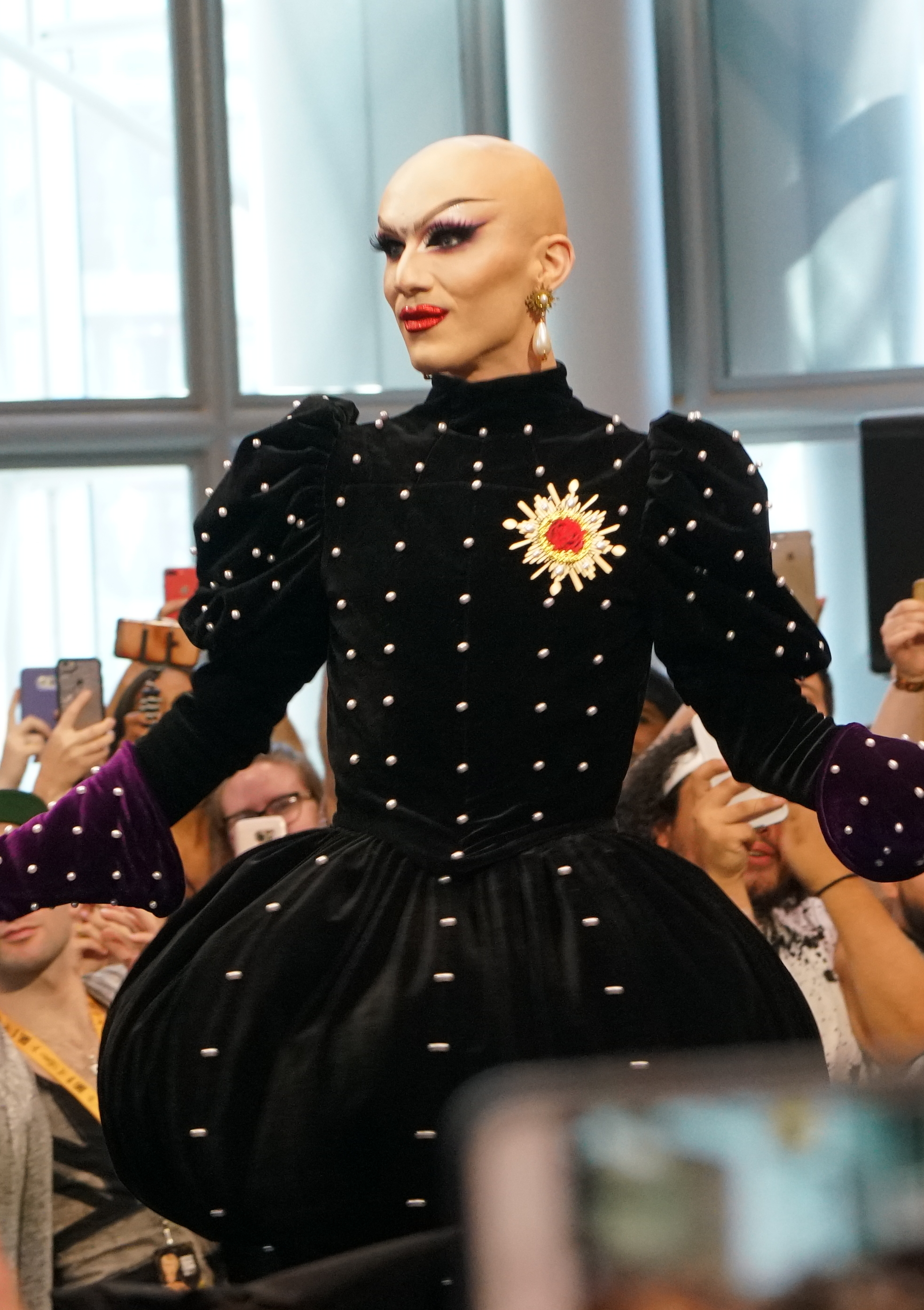
Sasha Velour

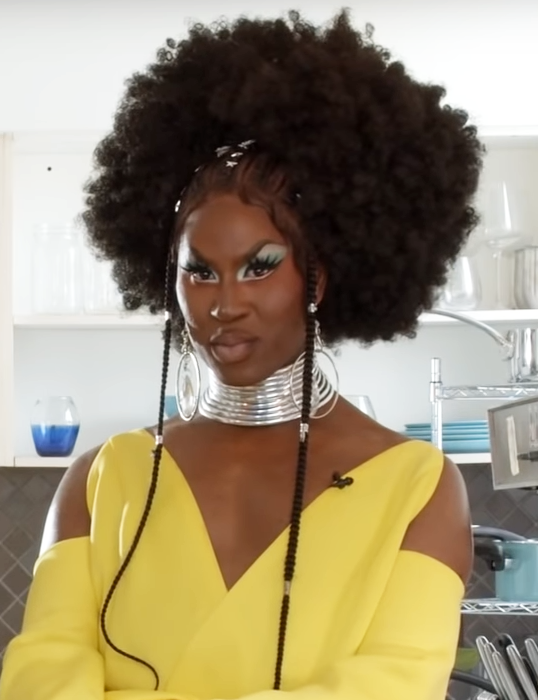
Shea Couleé

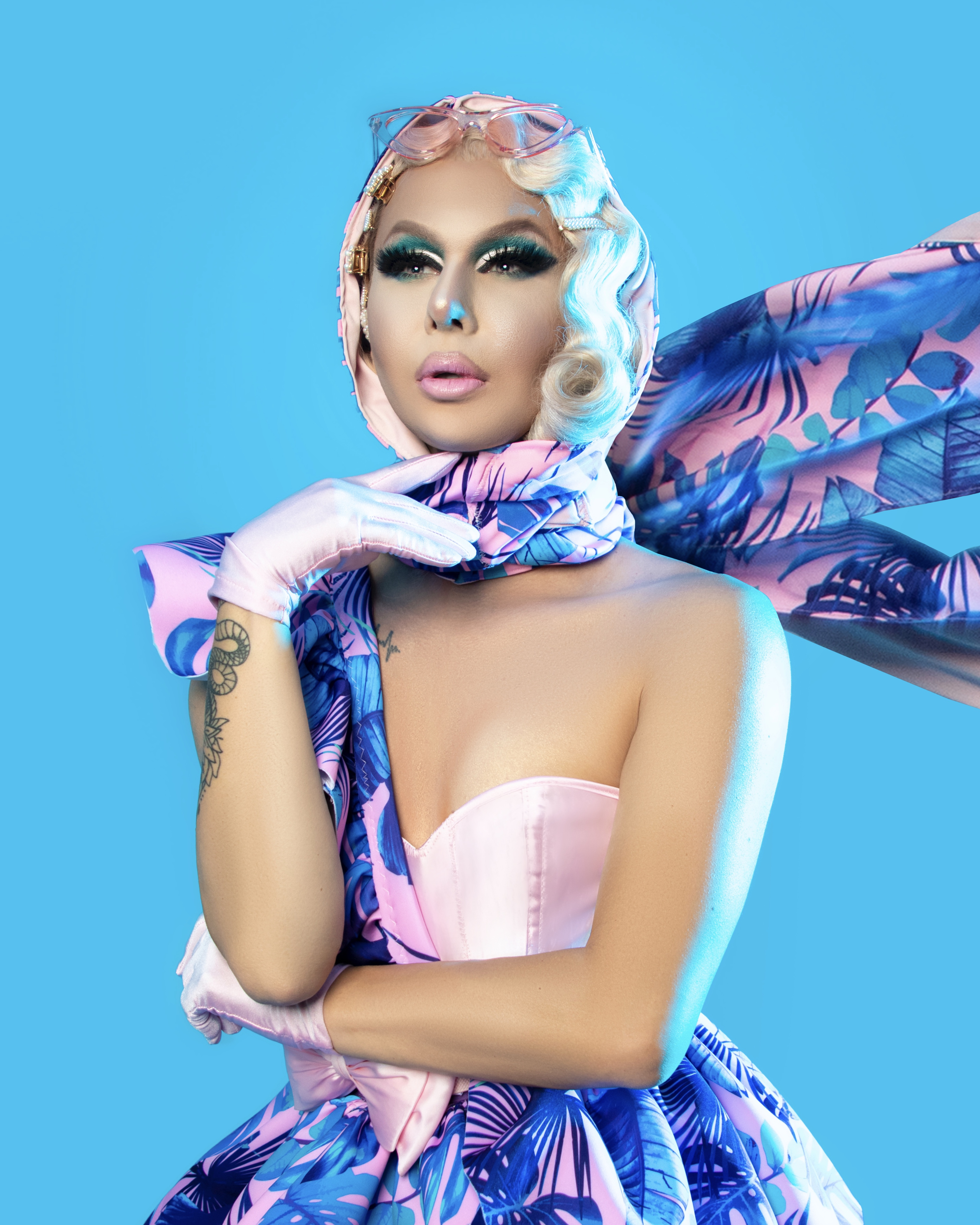
Trinity Taylor

The four finalists competing in the last challenge of the ninth season.

The final four contestants return to the Werk Room after Alexis Michelle's elimination on the previous episode. On a new day, Michelle Visage greets the group and reveals the final challenge, which tasks the contestants with writing, recording, and performing choreography to their own verses of RuPaul's song "Category Is". Visage reveals that Todrick Hall will record the tracks, and invites the contestants to join her and RuPaul to record for the podcast RuPaul: What's the Tee? The contestants write lyrics in the Werk Room and record with Hall and another record producer.

During her interview with RuPaul and Visage, Peppermint discusses her experience being both a drag performer and a trans woman. Sasha Velour talks about her relationship with her late mother. Shea Couleé and Trinity Taylor discuss their upbringings. The latter describes having a falling out with her late mother, despite also being her caregiver. The contestants rehearse choreography with Hall on the main stage.

On the main stage, RuPaul welcomes fellow judges Visage, Carson Kressley, and Ross Mathews. The contestants perform "Category Is". The runway category is "Final Four Eleganza Extravaganza". RuPaul shares childhood photographs of each contestant and asks them to share words of wisdom with their younger selves. The judges share their final critiques for each contestant. RuPaul also asks the contestants to say why they should win the competition and not their competitors. She excuses the contestants from the main stage so the judges can deliberate. The contestants return to the main stage, then face off in a lip-sync contest to RuPaul's song "U Wear It Well". RuPaul decides not to eliminate anyone from the competition, allowing all four to compete in the finale. She asks viewers to vote on social media for who they think should win.

== Production and broadcast ==
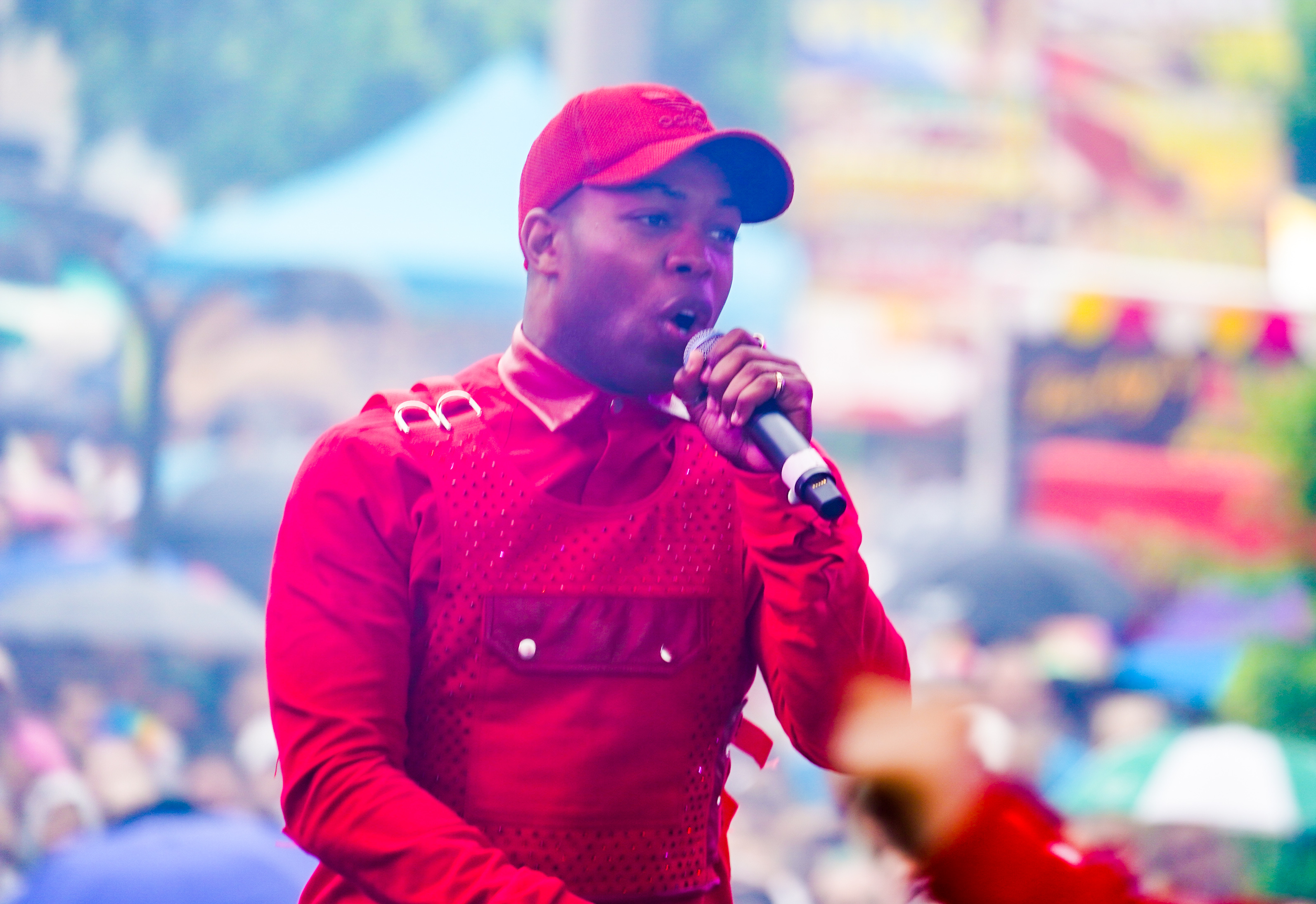
The contestants record verses and receive choreography coaching from Todrick Hall (pictured in 2019).

The episode originally aired on June 9, 2017.

Sasha Velour's lyrics for "Category Is" include "Sasha Velour relies on brains" and "Beauty be damned, let monsters reign!"

After the show aired, Streams of "U Wear It Well" increased by 154 percent for the week ending June 15, 2017.

=== Fashion ===
For "Category Is", Peppermint wears a purple bodysuit with gold jewelry and a large wig. Sasha Velour has a black dress and short dark hair. She wears one green glove and one white glove. Trinity Taylor's outfit has an animal print. She wears a red wig. Shea Couleé has a black-and-blue outfit, blue shoes, and an orange wig. For the fashion show, Peppermint wears a red dress and a large wig. Sasha Velour's pink outfit has a matching crown and leather gloves. Shea Couleé says her look is inspired by Balmain, Beyoncé, and Bob Mackie. She wears tall boots and a blue wig. Trinity Taylor wears a pageant gown with chains on the back.

== Reception ==
Oliver Sava of The A.V. Club gave the episode a rating of 'B-'. In a review for Vulture, Joel Kim Booster rated the episode three out of five stars. Sam Brooks ranked the "U Wear It Well" performance number 136 in The Spinoff's 2019 "definitive ranking" of the show's 162 lip-sync contests to date.
