= The Beach House (2018 film) =

- Based on: The Beach House by Mary Alice Monroe
- Written by: Maria Nation
- Directed by: Roger Spottiswoode
- Starring: Minka Kelly; Andie MacDowell; Chad Michael Murray
- Music by: Valerie Biggin
- Country of origin: United States
- Original language: English

Production
- Producers: Ron French; Stephen Harmaty; Andie MacDowell; Brian Pitt; Dan Wigutow
- Cinematography: Peter Wunstorf
- Editors: Dominique Fortin; Jason Pielak

Original release
- Network: Hallmark Channel
- Release: April 28, 2018

The Beach House is a 2018 American made-for-television drama film directed by Roger Spottiswoode based on the 2002 novel by Mary Alice Monroe. It stars Minka Kelly, Andie MacDowell, Chad Michael Murray, Donna Biscoe and Makenzie Vega.

Returning to her family beach house upon her mother Lovie's request, Caretta plans to soon return to Chicago until unexpected events change her mind.

== Plot ==
Caretta "Cara" Rudland loses her advertising job in Chicago and returns to the family beach house in South Carolina at the request of her mother Lovie. Not long after Cara arrives, Lovie tries to set her up with an old flame, Brett Beauchamps. Having just gotten out of a relationship and not planning on staying for very long, Cara resists.

Lovie works with her friend Flo and other locals to protect wild sea turtles during their spawning cycle. Cara has always resented her mother's devotion to the turtles (Lovie went so far as to source the name "Caretta" from the scientific name for loggerheads). Cara is also initially jealous when she meets Toy Sooner, a single, pregnant 20-year-old whom Lovie has taken in.

In addition, Cara must contend with Palmer, her assertive, ambitious brother. Their relationship is tense, as he resents her for moving to Chicago and leaving him to deal with their late father, who was a domineering man. He announces plans to move Lovie in with his family and put up condos on the property where the beach house currently stands. Cara and Lovie object, but Palmer refuses to listen.

When Lovie reveals that she has terminal cancer and likely will not live much longer, Cara attempts to restore their relationship. She helps out by fixing up the house and marking the turtles' nests on the beach. Faced with the reality of death, Lovie finds the courage to stand up to Palmer, taking back control of her finances and planning to leave the beach house to Cara.

During a hurricane, Flo digs up the turtle eggs, despite it being illegal, and brings them to the beach house for safe keeping. Toy is rescued from the elements by Brett before she gives birth three weeks early. After the hurricane, they all reunite. Cara and Brett rekindle their romance, Palmer comes to terms with his mother's wishes and cancer diagnosis, and Lovie and Flo rebury the turtle eggs on the beach. At the end of the summer, Lovie dies peacefully.

One year later Cara is still living in South Carolina, is in a loving relationship with Brett, and helps oversee the turtles hatching.

== Cast ==
- Minka Kelly as Cara Rudland
- Andie MacDowell as Lovie Rudland
- Chad Michael Murray as Brett Beauchamps
- Makenzie Vega as Toy
- Donna Biscoe as Flo
- Donny Boaz as Palmer Rudland
- Alyshia Ochse as Julia Rudland
- Selena Anduze as Dr. Pittman
- Carrie Anne Hunt as Young Lovie
- Chase Stokes as Russell Bennett
- Maiyee Apple Tam as Assistant
- Anthony Triceri as Order Guy
- Michael Burnett as Puppeteer
- David Moncrief as Richard Devries
- Luna Munroe as Hurricane Evacuee / Pregnant Girl
- Michael Wayne Thomas as Boater
- Annie Jamison as Upscale Restaurant Patron
- Seaton Stanley as Cooper
- Shelby Christine Freeman as Pregnant Girl
- Havana Blum as Linnea Rudland
- Minh Phan as uncredited fabulous man
- Lynne Burnett as Turtle puppeteer

== Production and release ==
The film is adapted from Mary Alice Monroe's 2002 novel The Beach House. It was broadcast on the Hallmark Channel with a TV-G rating at 9:00 p.m. on April 28, 2018.
