= Wireless (TV series) =

- Genre: Survival thriller
- Directed by: Zach Wechter; Jack Seidman
- Starring: Tye Sheridan; Lukas Gage; Francesca Reale; Mace Coronel; Sydney Park; Andie MacDowell
- Country of origin: United States
- Original language: English

Production
- Executive producers: Steven Soderbergh; Michael Sugar; Zach Wechter; Jack Seidman; Cathy Konrad; Danny Sherman
- Producers: Christian Heuer; Isabel San Vargas; Mike Glasz
- Production companies: Pickpocket; Extension 765; Propagate Content

Original release
- Network: Quibi
- Release: September 13, 2020

Wireless is a 2020 American survival thriller television series. It stars Tye Sheridan, Lukas Gage, Francesca Reale, Mace Coronel, Sydney Park and Andie MacDowell. Steven Soderbergh serves as an executive producer. It premiered on September 13, 2020, on Quibi.

== Plot ==
A self-obsessed college student becomes stranded in the Colorado mountains and has to rely on his quickly dying phone to survive.

== Cast ==
- Tye Sheridan as Andrew "Andy" Braddock, an alcoholic college student stranded in the Colorado mountains
- Lukas Gage as Jake, Andy's best friend who frequently FaceTimes
- Francesca Reale as Dana, Andy's ex
- Mace Coronel as Lionel Braddock, Andy's younger brother who has started vaping
- Sydney Park as Shannon / "Callie", a girl Andy matches with on Tinder
- Andie MacDowell as Elaine Braddock, Andy's overprotective mother who frequently calls
- Eric Dane as Officer T.K. Kirschner, a policeman who pulls Andy over
- Froy Gutierrez as Brad Carnegie, a college guy throwing the party and Dana's new boyfriend

== Episodes ==
| No. | Title | Directed by | Written by | Original release date |
|---|---|---|---|---|
| 1 | "100%" | Zach Wechter | Jack Seidman & Zach Wechter | September 13, 2020 |
After Andy takes his deceased father’s Ford Bronco and begins driving towards a New Years party, he obsessively stalks his ex-girlfriend Dana’s social media accounts before being pulled over by a policeman, who lets Andy off on a warning. Andy continues driving, missing a warning on his phone for an incoming blizzard.
| 2 | "90%" | Zach Wechter | Jack Seidman & Zach Wechter | September 13, 2020 |
While on FaceTime, Jake encourages Andy to get back on Tinder, where Andy matches with Callie. After learning his planned driving route is closed, Andy attempts to take a shortcut before accidentally crashing on the side of the road.
| 3 | "80%" | Zach Wechter | Jack Seidman & Zach Wechter | September 13, 2020 |
Andy fails to contact assistance due to the weather and asks Jake to come get him. Meanwhile, Andy deals with his younger brother, Lionel, over FaceTime after learning Lionel has started vaping and worrying their mother. While messaging Callie, Andy slips and breaks his ankle.
| 4 | "70%" | Zach Wechter | Jack Seidman & Zach Wechter | September 13, 2020 |
Andy accidentally texts his mom that he took his father’s car and recruits Lionel to delete the text from her phone before she sees. Lionel gets caught and Andy lies to his mom that the car got stolen while he was getting pizza near campus. He then posts the same lie to his Instagram to cover his tracks.
| 5 | "60%" | Zach Wechter | Jack Seidman & Zach Wechter | September 13, 2020 |
Andy discovers Jake hasn’t left to pick him up yet before begging Jake to go along with his lie and say Jake was the one driving when the car was stolen. Andy is patched into a phone call with his mom and a policeman over the alleged car theft.
| 6 | "50%" | Zach Wechter | Jack Seidman & Zach Wechter | September 13, 2020 |
After learning that Andy had his license revoked because of a DUI, Jake denounces him as a liar and refuses to pick him up. Through a series of voicemails, it’s revealed Andy’s DUI was while he was driving Dana’s car and that he had gotten it impounded.
| 7 | "40%" | Zach Wechter | Jack Seidman & Zach Wechter | September 13, 2020 |
Andy learns Callie is nearby and begs her to pick him up. She is suspicious and tells him to call the cops before he discloses his DUI. She reveals her real name as Shannon, tells him he needs help with his drinking, and finally agrees to help him. After learning Dana has a new boyfriend, Andy angrily honks the horn, triggering an avalanche that buries the car.
| 8 | "30%" | Zach Wechter | Jack Seidman & Zach Wechter | September 13, 2020 |
Andy wakes up to the car buried vertically underneath the snow. He tries to join a nearby WiFi network but is unable to. He later cuts his hand on an ice scraper while trying to clear snow and learns his phone has dropped to 20%.
| 9 | "20%" | Zach Wechter | Jack Seidman & Zach Wechter | September 13, 2020 |
Andy does a deep dive through his videos before creating a makeshift alcohol bottle fire. He records a goodbye video to his family "in case" as his phone drops to 10% and he takes out a lighter.
| 10 | "10%" | Zach Wechter | Jack Seidman & Zach Wechter | September 13, 2020 |
Andy lights the fire to begin melting the snow above the car while he scrapes it. He is able to open a small tunnel that leads back to the surface where he calls Shannon back, only to discover he accidentally called Dana. Andy calls 911, and a dispatcher answers just as his phone dies. Andy, feeling hot due to hypothermia, discovers Shannon’s car, also buried under the snow. She is already on the phone with 911 who sends out a rescue team. Later, in a police car and charging his phone, Andy calls his mom.

== Production ==
=== Development ===
In November 2019, it was announced Tye Sheridan had joined the cast of the series, with Steven Soderbergh executive producing, and Quibi distributing.

=== Casting ===
In December 2019, Andie MacDowell, Lukas Gage, Francesca Reale and Mace Coronel joined the cast of the series.
