= Riding the Bus with My Sister =

2005 film directed by Anjelica Huston

- Based on: Riding the Bus with My Sister by Rachel Simon
- Written by: Joyce Eliason
- Directed by: Anjelica Huston
- Starring: Rosie O'Donnell; Andie MacDowell
- Music by: Stewart Copeland
- Country of origin: United States
- Original language: English

Production
- Producer: Sherri Saito
- Cinematography: Anthony B. Richmond
- Editor: Roberto Silvi
- Running time: 90 minutes
- Production companies: Blue Ridge Motion Pictures; Hallmark Hall of Fame Productions

Original release
- Network: CBS
- Release: May 1, 2005

Riding the Bus with My Sister is a 2005 television film that aired on CBS as part of the Hallmark Hall of Fame anthology series, based on the 2002 memoir of the same name by Rachel Simon. The film, like the book, is about the time Simon spent with her sister Beth, who has a developmental disability, and whose lifestyle revolves around riding buses in her home city of Reading, Pennsylvania. Andie MacDowell plays Rachel Simon, while Rosie O'Donnell plays Beth. It was directed by Anjelica Huston, with a screenplay by Joyce Eliason.

Riding the Bus with My Sister was filmed in Hamilton, Ontario, Canada.

== Plot ==
Beth, a woman with an intellectual disability, is dependent on her father, and spends her days riding the fixed route buses in the city of Reading, Pennsylvania where she lives. When her father dies, her sister Rachel comes to stay with her. At first, they fight about Beth's rampant consumption of junk food, resulting in bringing her cholesterol levels up, but after six months Rachel realizes that Beth is content with her life.

== Differences from the book ==
Many aspects of the book were altered for the film. These include turning Rachel into a fashion photographer, eliminating an older sister and changing the name of the brother, and having the sisters' father die early in the story (whereas, in real life, he was still alive when the movie aired). The civil rights aspect of the story was also less explicit, the backstory was compressed, both characters were presented as more extreme than they are in the book, and several other characters were composites.

== Cast ==
- Andie MacDowell as Rachel Simon
- Rosie O'Donnell as Beth Simon
- Richard T. Jones as Jesse
- D.W. Moffett as Rick
- Boyd Banks as Henry
- Tom Barnett as Bobby
- Peter Cockett as Sam
- Raven Dauda as Shanae
- Jayne Eastwood as Estella
- Allegra Fulton as Vera
- Shauna MacDonald as Nona
- Roberta Maxwell as Valerie
- Vijay Mehta as Pradlip
- Charles Officer as Xavier
- Simon Reynolds as Morris
- Angelo Tsarouchas as Mean Eugene

== Production ==
In May 2004, it was announced Anjelica Huston would direct an adaptation of the book Riding the Bus with My Sister.

== Reception ==
Unlike the book, which received positive reviews, the film received negative reviews. O'Donnell's performance as Beth has been criticized for being "over the top." Howard Stern, Variety, Opie and Anthony, and the Pittsburgh Post-Gazette all commented that O'Donnell sounded like Pee-wee Herman.

Despite the negative reviews, Riding the Bus with My Sister was a ratings success with 15 million viewers and a 3.5/8 share.

Simon said of the movie: "It's a poignant, moving, and powerful film. It also portrays both characters, as well as the struggles of the special sibling relationship, in a more realistic way than we usually get to see in film, and presents bus drivers as the everyday heroes that I now know them to be. In addition, the movie highlights some of the main themes from my book: Beth's right to live her life by her own choices, the importance of public transportation for a fully independent life, the essential need for friendships in the community, and the challenges and rewards of the sibling bond."

== Awards ==
In 2006, the film was nominated for a Prism Award for Best TV Movie or Miniseries, and a Young Artist Award for Best Family Television Movie or Special.

== See also ==
- List of Hallmark Hall of Fame episodes
