= At Risk (2010 film) =

2010 American television film

- Based on: At Risk by Patricia Cornwell
- Screenplay by: John Pielmeier
- Directed by: Tom McLoughlin
- Starring: Andie MacDowell; Daniel Sunjata
- Country of origin: United States
- Original language: English

Production
- Producer: Damian Gancziewski
- Cinematography: Alwyn Kumst
- Editor: Charles Burnstein
- Running time: 90 minutes

Original release
- Network: Lifetime Television
- Release: April 10, 2010

At Risk is a 2010 American TV movie directed by Tom McLoughlin and starring Andie MacDowell and Daniel Sunjata. It is based on the book of the same name by Patricia Cornwell, who has a small role as a waitress.

The film was followed by a sequel, The Front (2010), also directed by Tom McLoughlin.

== Plot ==
Win Garano, an Apache nicknamed "Geronimo", is working for Monique "Money" Lamont, in the Boston DA's department. Lamont is running for Governor of Massachusetts, using the concept of "at risk" to try to gain votes, saying that everyone is at risk from crime, but when she becomes governor it will be the criminals who will be at risk. To promote her political campaign, she re-opens and assigns Garano to a cold case concerning the murder of a 90-year-old woman 35 years previously, demonstrating to voters that she can clear up old crimes as well as new ones.

Jesus Baptista, a criminal, has recently been acquitted of drug dealing and arson. One evening he goes to Lamont's house and lies in wait for her. At the same time, Garano is visiting his grandmother, Nana, where he sees TV coverage of a press conference called by Lamont, during which she confirms in response to an aggressive questioner, that the investigator on the cold case is called "Geronimo". Upset by this he sends a text to Lamont submitting his resignation. But immediately afterwards he receives a text threatening Nana's life unless he drops the case. This prompts him to change his mind and he calls Lamont to tell her that he wishes to continue the investigation. At this point Baptista snatches Lamont and drags her into the house causing her to drop her mobile. Unable to contact her, Garano drives to Lamont's house where a fight ensues, and Baptista is shot dead by Garano. Evidence is discovered that Baptista had apparently been paid to kill Lamont. Facts about the cold case are difficult to find and police corruption is suspected. It emerges that there is a connection between the murder and the attack on Lamont.

Garano and his partner, Sykes, race against the clock to figure out not only the murder of Vivian Finley, but how it connects to Monique’s assault, and the suicide of a fireman, named Mark Holland.

Garano and Sykes question Vivian’s daughter-in-law, Kim, who confesses to the murder and cover up, but something doesn’t sit right with Garano. Upon realizing that Kim Finley’s son is none other than Jesse Huber, Garano’s former mentor and friend, it becomes a race against the clock to find Jesse before he could hurt Nana.

Garano finds a distraught Jesse with Nana at her house. Jesse admits to being the killer, to protect his mother, and demands Garano release her. He agrees, but Jesse then holds the gun to his own head. Garano tries to encourage him to put his gun down and not to commit suicide, but the distressed Jesse then turns the gun on Garano. As Sykes comes through the door, a shootout occurs, and Sykes is killed as Garano kills Jesse. The cold case of Vivian Finley is officially solved with her murderer having been killed himself. Garano is seen at the morgue looking at his friend's dead body, and the film ends with him standing at Sykes’ graveside in Knoxville, as he begins to cry, a lesson that his old mentor, Jesse, had taught him to let go.

== Cast ==
- Andie MacDowell as Monique ("Money") Lamont
- Daniel Sunjata as Win ("Geronimo") Garano
- Diahann Carroll as Garano's grandmother ("Nana")
- Edsson Morales as Jesus Baptista

== Reception ==
Reviews were mixed. David Hinckley, in the Daily News, wrote "This Lifetime adaptation of Patricia Cornwell's thriller At Risk is smarter and better than the average TV movie." while April MacIntyre in Monsters and Critics criticized inconsistencies in the plot; she said "In this day and age of empty coffers it is a stretch at best to think Massachusetts' tax payer funds would be earmarked to solve a Tennessee cold case murder. Another annoyance for me, as an ex resident of Essex county, is the confusion of county names. Boston is Suffolk County. Why that detail was cocked up is beyond me." and according to Laura Fries in Variety, the film "has a talented cast and polished tech credits, but they just don't yield much of a movie".
