= The Last Laugh (2019 film) =

- Film poster
- Directed by: Greg Pritikin
- Written by: Greg Pritikin
- Produced by: Rob Paris
- Starring: Richard Dreyfuss; Chevy Chase; Andie MacDowell; Lewis Black; Kate Micucci; Chris Parnell
- Cinematography: Steve Gainer
- Edited by: Michael Palmerio
- Music by: Jay Weigel
- Production companies: Netflix; Paris Film, Inc.
- Distributed by: Netflix
- Release date: January 11, 2019
- Running time: 98 minutes
- Country: United States
- Language: English

The Last Laugh is a 2019 American comedy film written and directed by Greg Pritikin. It stars Richard Dreyfuss and Chevy Chase.

The film follows a former stand-up comedian who retired from the spotlight 50 years ago who reunites with his former manager after being convinced to do one last comedy tour.

== Plot ==
Newly retired Al Hart (Chevy Chase) was a relentless talent manager who is slowing down, so his granddaughter Jeanie suggests he move to a retirement village, where he can enjoy fine dining and regular entertainment.

There, Al discovers Buddy Green (Richard Dreyfuss) is a resident. Buddy was Al’s first client and had potential for great success. 50 years ago he had booked him a spot on The Ed Sullivan Show back in 1967, which was considered the crown jewel of comedy gigs then. It would have established him as a major star. Inexplicably, he never showed up and quit comedy, instead choosing to raise a family and become a podiatrist.

Al is surprised to discover that Buddy is his tour guide at an assisted living facility, where Buddy continues to entertain the residents.

After moving in, Al and Buddy reminisce about the good old days, Al lamenting the missed opportunity to be big stars in Hollywood. It’s at this point where Al, irritable with having to merge with people his age, tries to convince Buddy to let him manage him again.

Initially resistant, the what-ifs have never really left Buddy and Al, seeing the parade of residents to the morgue figures that he deserves a last shot to see if he has the stuff. When Buddy’s partner in the home passes away, he feels free to go for it.

Al finds his old rolodex and starts calling his contacts. He books Buddy on a cross-country tour, starting off in tiny venues in Podunk towns gradually working up to bigger shows until a big late night TV show in NYC. Al negotiates with his contact Vic to get Buddy on Jimmy Fallon.

The first is a truck stop near Vegas, then Tijuana, Tucson, Texas and Kansas. The two bicker like an old couple as they travel. As Buddy is exhausted, he crashes in the motel room.

Al wanders to a bar and meets free-spirited artist Doris in Kansas City, becoming sweet on her. She accompanies them on to Chicago, and when they arrive at the hotel, Al is unsure what room he’ll be in.

Before Al can decide anything, his contact Vic tells him he didn’t get Buddy on Jimmy Fallon. In a quandary, he confides in Doris, who offers him `shrooms to get his mind off it.

Outside of the Chicago gig, Jeanie and Charlie Green finally find Al. Neither he nor Buddy had called either of them during their two week road trip, Charlie scolds Buddy in the dressing room, where he first hears that his dad had been a comic half a century ago. We also discover Buddy is dying of pancreatic cancer, explaining his marijuana use.

As with all the gigs, except Texas, Buddy is a roaring success. Meanwhile, Al is fully tripping on the ‘shrooms. He and Doris spend the night together. He finds a note from her in the morning, saying her goodbyes.

At first Al, feeling down about Doris and Buddy’s cancer suggests they quit. Finally telling him he didn’t get The Tonight Show, Buddy says he doesn’t care and he is going regardless. Jeanie and Charlie join Al and Buddy in the ride to NYC.

Discovering Max Becker, a once-client of Al’s is doing the Stephen Colbert Late Show in the Ed Sullivan theater in New York, he seeks him out. He offers him a huge bribe to give him his slot for Buddy.

Buddy goes on the stage after Max introduces him. After his extremely successful performance, he looks up, apologizing to Ed Sullivan for standing him up on that stage 50 years ago.

Broke, we discover that Al has not returned to the home, and he’s now with Doris in Kansas. The message is, it’s never too late to pursue a dream.

== Cast ==
- Richard Dreyfuss as Buddy Green
- Chevy Chase as Al Hart
- Andie MacDowell as Doris Lovejoy
- Lewis Black as Max Becker
- Kate Micucci as Jeannie
- Chris Parnell as Charlie Green
- George Wallace as Johnny Sunshine
- Richard Kind as Jimbo
- Chris Fleming as Palace Comic

== Production ==
The film was announced on September 25, 2017 after a deal was brokered for Netflix to distribute. The cast, headlined by Richard Dreyfuss and Chevy Chase, was announced and filming began in New Orleans the same day. The film was dedicated "for Paul Mazursky."

== Release ==
It was released on Netflix on January 11, 2019.

== Reception ==
On review aggregator website Rotten Tomatoes, the film holds an approval rating of 53% based on 15 reviews, with an average rating of 5.4/10. The site's consensus reads: "Chevy Chase and Richard Dreyfuss are a sight for sore eyes, but they unfortunately do not get The Last Laugh in a generic buddy comedy that never musters any jokes worthy of their comedic chops."
