= Paper Year =

- Directed by: Rebecca Addelman
- Written by: Rebecca Addelman
- Produced by: Christina Piovesan; Jennifer Shin
- Starring: Eve Hewson; Avan Jogia; Hamish Linklater; Andie MacDowell
- Cinematography: Steven Capitano Calitri
- Edited by: Bryan Atkinson
- Production company: First Generation Films
- Distributed by: Pacific Northwest Pictures
- Release date: April 2018; (Calgary Underground Film Festival)
- Running time: 89 minutes
- Country: Canada
- Language: English

Paper Year is a 2018 Canadian romantic drama film written and directed by Rebecca Addelman and starring Eve Hewson, Avan Jogia, Hamish Linklater and Andie MacDowell. It is Addelman's feature debut.

== Cast ==
- Andie MacDowell as Joanne Winters
- Avan Jogia as Dan Delaney
- Eve Hewson as Franny Winters
- Hamish Linklater as Noah Bearinger
- Evan Stern as Young PA
- Andrew Markowiak as Geoff

== Production ==
According to Addelman, most of the film was shot in Toronto.

== Reception ==
The film has a 71% rating on Rotten Tomatoes, based on seven reviews with an average rating of 7.7/10. Kate Taylor of The Globe and Mail awarded the film three stars out of four. Bruce DeMara of the Toronto Star also gave the film three stars out of four.
