= Love After Love (2017 film) =

- Theatrical release poster
- Directed by: Russell Harbaugh
- Written by: Russell Harbaugh; Eric Mendelsohn
- Produced by: Lauren Haber; Lucas Joaquin; Michael Prall
- Starring: Chris O'Dowd; Andie MacDowell
- Cinematography: Chris Teague
- Edited by: Matthew C. Hart; John Magary
- Music by: David Shire
- Production companies: Secret Engine; Weedon Media
- Distributed by: IFC Films
- Release dates: April 22, 2017 (Tribeca); March 30, 2018 (United States)
- Running time: 91 minutes
- Country: United States
- Language: English
- Box office: $113,074

Love After Love is a 2017 American independent drama film starring Chris O'Dowd and Andie MacDowell. It is the directorial debut of Russell Harbaugh. The film premiered at the Tribeca Film Festival in April 2017, and received a limited release in the United States from IFC Films in March 2018.

== Plot ==
After the death of their father, two sons and their mother face trials and explore new beginnings.

== Cast ==
- Chris O'Dowd as Nicholas
- Andie MacDowell as Suzanne
- James Adomian as Chris
- Juliet Rylance as Rebecca
- Dree Hemingway as Emilie
- Gareth Williams as Glenn
- Francesca Faridany as Karen
- Matt Salinger as Michael
- Romy Byrne as Ashleigh

== Reception ==
On review aggregator website Rotten Tomatoes, the film holds an approval rating of 86% based on 28 reviews, with an average score of 7.6/10. The site's consensus reads: "Love After Love examines the ways in which profound grief can affect a family's dynamic -- and refuses to settle for pat Hollywood answers, much to the viewer's benefit". On Metacritic, the film has a weighted average score of 84 out of 100, based on 14 critics, indicating "universal acclaim".
