= Mary Alice Monroe =

American novelist

Mary Alice Monroe (born May 25, 1960) is an American author known for fiction that explores the parallels between nature and human nature. She was born in Evanston, Illinois. Many of her novels deal with environmental issues. The Beach House and Swimming Lessons both refer to the plight of injured sea turtles.

Monroe resides in South Carolina, and many of her novels are set in the southern United States and feature "strong Southern women".

Her novel Time Is a River is about breast cancer survivors in a fly-fishing group in North Carolina, and Last Light Over Carolina describes the life and times of the shrimping industry.

Monroe has received the 2008 Award for Writing from the South Carolina Center for the Book, 2014 South Carolina Award for Literary Excellence, 2015 SW Florida Author of Distinction Award, the RT Lifetime Achievement Award, the International Book Award for Green Fiction. Monroe is a 2018 inductee to the South Carolina Academy of Authors.

== Bibliography ==
Title	Year	Series
The Long Road Home	1995	
Girl in the Mirror	1998	
The Book Club	1999	
Second Star to the Right	1999	Children's (as Mary Alice Kruesi)
One Summer's Night	2000	Children's (as Mary Alice Kruesi)
The Four Seasons	2001	
The Beach House	2002	Beach House #1
Skyward	2003	
Sweetgrass	2005	
Turtle Summer	2007	Children's
Swimming Lessons	2007	Beach House #2
Time Is a River	2008	
Last Light Over Carolina	2009	
The Butterfly's Daughter	2011	
Beach House Memories	2012	Beach House #3
The Summer Girls	2013	Lowcountry Summer #1
A Butterfly Called Hope	2013	Children's
The Summer Wind	2014	Lowcountry Summer #2
The Summer's End	2015	Lowcountry Summer #3
A Lowcountry Wedding	2016	Lowcountry Summer #4
A Lowcountry Christmas	2016	Lowcountry Summer #5
Beach House for Rent	2017	Beach House #4
Beach House Reunion	2018	Beach House #5
The Summer Guests	2019	
On Ocean Boulevard	2020	Beach House #6
The Summer of Lost and Found	2021	Beach House #7
The Islanders	2021	Children's
Search for Treasure	2022	Children's
Shipwrecked	2024	Children's
Where the Rivers Merge	2025	

== Adaptations ==
The Beach House (2002) was adapted as the TV movie The Beach House (2018) by the Hallmark Channel.
