= My Happy Ending (film) =

- American theatrical release poster
- Directed by: Sharon Maymon; Tal Granit
- Based on: Sof Tov by Anat Gov
- Produced by: Talia Kleinhendler; Osnat Handelsman-Keren
- Starring: Andie MacDowell
- Distributed by: Universal Pictures
- Release date: February 24, 2023
- Running time: 89 minutes
- Countries: Israel; United Kingdom
- Language: English
- Box office: $59,329

My Happy Ending is a 2023 Israeli-British comedy-drama film directed by Sharon Maymon and Tal Granit and starring Andie MacDowell. It is based on the play Sof Tov by Anat Gov.

== Cast ==
- Andie MacDowell as Julia
- Miriam Margolyes as Judy
- Sally Phillips as Mikey
- Rakhee Thakrar as Imaan
- Tamsin Greig as Nancy
- Tom Cullen
- Michelle Greenidge as Nurse Emilia
- David Walliams as Joey

== Production ==
Filming wrapped in Wales in November 2021.

== Release ==
In January 2023, it was announced that Roadside Attractions acquired North American distribution rights to the film which was released in the United States on February 24, 2023. The film was released on DVD on April 5, 2023.

== Critical reception ==
On the review aggregator website Rotten Tomatoes, 40% of 15 critics' reviews are positive, with an average rating of 4.7/10.

Katie Rife of RogerEbert.com awarded the film one and a half stars and wrote that it "can’t even do a tearjerker right."

Ben Kenigsberg of The New York Times gave the film a negative review and wrote, "But the labored screen adaptation shows regrettably few signs of personal fire, and many signs of a work that has been sapped of the intimacy of live theater."
