= Andie MacDowell =

American actress and model (born 1958)

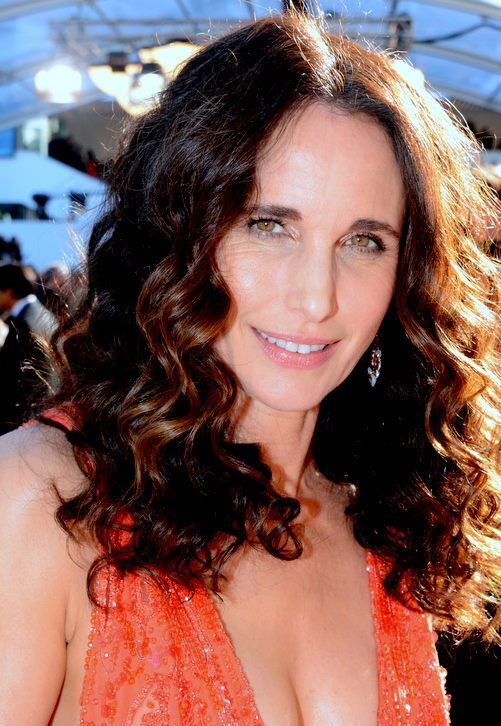
- MacDowell at the 2015 Cannes Film Festival
- Born: Rosalie Anderson MacDowell; April 21, 1958 (age 68); Gaffney, South Carolina, U.S.
- Occupations: Actress; model
- Years active: 1977–present
- Works: Full list
- Spouses: Paul Qualley (m. 1986; div. 1999); Rhett Hartzog (m. 2001; div. 2004)
- Children: 3, including Rainey and Margaret Qualley

Rosalie Anderson MacDowell (born April 21, 1958) is an American actress and former fashion model. MacDowell is known for her starring film roles in romantic comedies and dramas. She has modeled for Calvin Klein and has been a spokeswoman for L'Oréal since 1986.

Her early films include Greystoke: The Legend of Tarzan, Lord of the Apes (1984) and the Brat Pack vehicle film St. Elmo's Fire (1985). Her breakout role was in Sex, Lies, and Videotape (1989) which earned her the Independent Spirit Award for Best Female Lead and a nomination for a Golden Globe Award for Best Actress – Motion Picture Drama. She then starred in a series of films including Green Card (1990), Groundhog Day (1993), Short Cuts (1993), Four Weddings and a Funeral (1994), Unstrung Heroes (1995), Michael (1996), Multiplicity (1996), and The Muse (1999).

MacDowell played supporting film roles in Beauty Shop (2005), Footloose (2011), Magic Mike XXL (2015), The Last Laugh (2019), Ready or Not (2019), The Other Zoey (2024) and Red Right Hand (2024). She starred in a number of independent films, including Love After Love (2017) She co-starred opposite her daughter Margaret Qualley in the Netflix miniseries Maid (2021) for which she was nominated for a Golden Globe Award. In 2023, MacDowell began starring in the Hallmark Channel fantasy drama series The Way Home.

== Early life ==
Rosalie Anderson MacDowell was born on April 21, 1958, in Gaffney, South Carolina, to Pauline "Paula" Johnston (née Oswald), a music teacher, and Marion St. Pierre MacDowell, a lumber executive who had studied forestry at the University of the South. Her parents called her Rose. She has three older sisters and they are of English, Irish, Scottish and Scots-Irish ancestry. Her mother was an alcoholic, and her parents divorced when she was six. MacDowell's mother died of a heart attack in 1981 at age 53 after living sober for a year.

When MacDowell was eight, her father remarried; this union lasted until his death. MacDowell graduated from Gaffney High School in 1976, then went on to attend Winthrop University for two years before moving briefly to Columbia, South Carolina.

== Career ==
=== 1978–1988: Modeling career ===
After having been spotted by a representative from Wilhelmina Models while she was on a trip to Los Angeles, MacDowell signed a modeling contract with Elite Model Management in New York City in 1978. Elite sent her to model in Paris for a year and a half.

In the early 1980s, MacDowell modeled for Vogue magazine and appeared in ad campaigns for Yves Saint Laurent, Vassarette, Armani perfume, Sabeth-Row, Mink International, Anne Klein, and Bill Blass. A series of billboards in Times Square and national television commercials for Calvin Klein won attention and led to her 1984 film debut in Greystoke: The Legend of Tarzan, Lord of the Apes. In this role, MacDowell's lines were dubbed by Glenn Close because her Southern accent was considered too pronounced for her role as Jane. In 1985, MacDowell filled a supporting role as a doctor in St. Elmo's Fire. In 1988 she made her television debut starring in the Italian miniseries The Secret of the Sahara. Since 1986, MacDowell has appeared in print and television advertisements for cosmetic and haircare company L'Oréal.

=== 1989–1999: Breakthrough and stardom ===
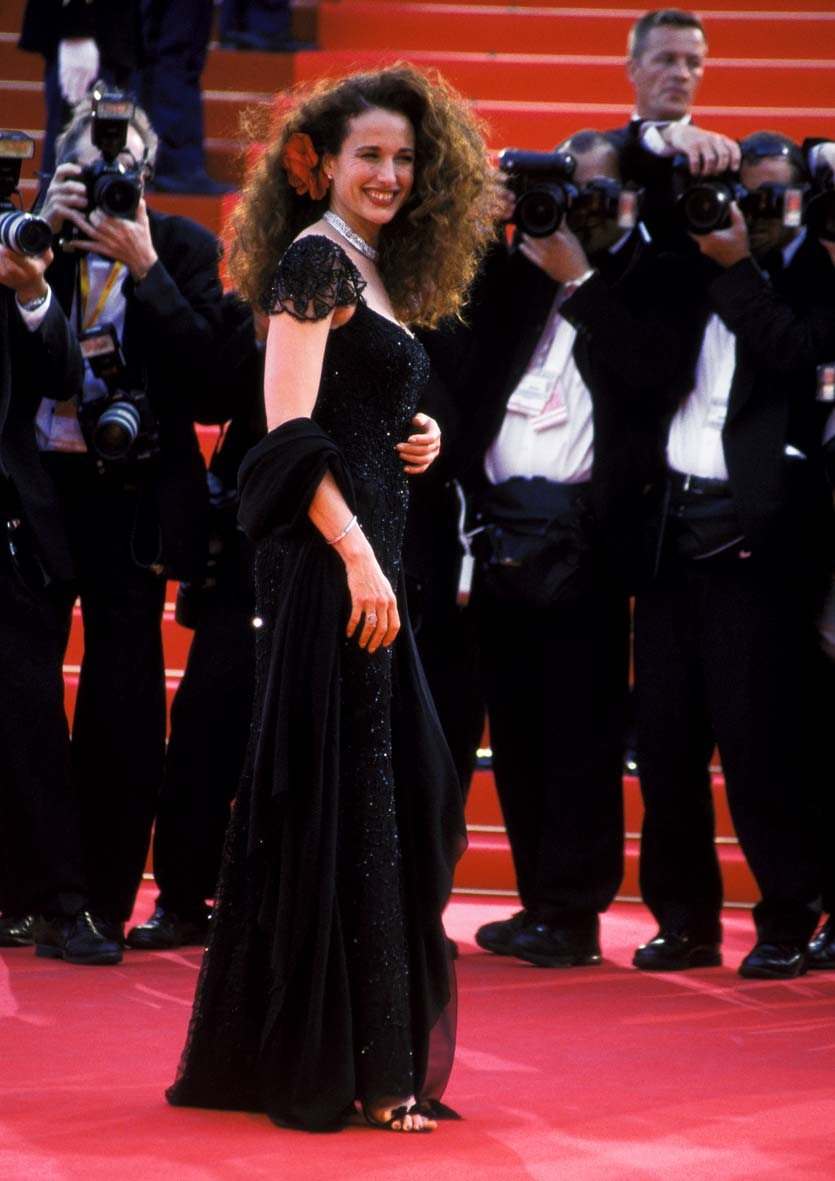
MacDowell at the 2001 Cannes Film Festival

MacDowell studied method acting with teachers from the Actors Studio in addition to working privately with coaches Harold Guskin and Warren Robertson. Four years later, director Steven Soderbergh cast her in the independent film Sex, Lies, and Videotape (1989). For her breakthrough role as Ann, the repressed married woman, MacDowell received positive reviews from critics. Her performance earned her an Independent Spirit Award, a Los Angeles Film Critics Association Award, and a nomination for the Golden Globe Award for Best Actress, among other award nominations.

After her big break with Sex, Lies, and Videotape, MacDowell went on to star in the romantic comedy film Green Card directed by Peter Weir. The screenplay focuses on an American woman who enters into a marriage of convenience with a Frenchman so he can obtain a green card and remain in the United States. The performance gained her Golden Globe Award nomination for Best Actress in a Motion Picture – Musical or Comedy. The following year she starred alongside John Malkovich in the crime comedy-drama The Object of Beauty, and opposite Bruce Willis in the action comedy Hudson Hawk. In 1992, MacDowell played the leading role in the mystery thriller film Ruby Cairo. The film fared poorly at the box office, grossing only $608,866 in the United States during its limited run opposite $24 million production budget. Later that year she made a cameo appearance in the satirical black comedy mystery film The Player directed by Robert Altman.

In 1993, MacDowell achieved stardom due to the box office success of director Harold Ramis's fantasy romantic comedy film Groundhog Day, starring opposite Bill Murray. Critics were enamored with MacDowell's performance. Gene Siskel said that she lit up the screen when she was on. Janet Maslin called her a "thorough delight", saying that MacDowell's performance offered a comforting, comedic presence. Hal Hinson said that the on-screen chemistry between MacDowell and Murray was "otherworldly" and that she was a perfect fit for comedy. For her performance she won the Saturn Award for Best Actress. Later that year, MacDowell starred in the Robert Altman-directed comedy-drama film Short Cuts. The film received critical acclaim. MacDowell received Golden Globe Special Ensemble Cast Award, Volpi Cup for Best Ensemble Cast, as well nomination for Chicago Film Critics Association Award for Best Supporting Actress.

In 1994, MacDowell co-starred in the British romantic comedy film Four Weddings and a Funeral opposite Hugh Grant. The film was made in six weeks, cost under £3 million, and became an unexpected success and the highest-grossing British film in history at the time, with worldwide box office total of $245.7 million. For her performance, she received another Golden Globe Award nomination for Best Actress in a Motion Picture – Musical or Comedy. Later that year she starred alongside Madeleine Stowe in the Western film Bad Girls: it was a box office disappointment, grossing $23 million worldwide. The following year, MacDowell had a supporting role in the comedy-drama Unstrung Heroes directed by Diane Keaton. The film earned positive reviews from critics.

In 1996, MacDowell appeared in two movies: first was the science fiction comedy film Multiplicity released on July 17, 1996. It received mixed reviews from critics, and grossed a worldwide total of $37 million at the box office, significantly less than its $45 million budget. Later that year she acted opposite John Travolta in the fantasy comedy film Michael. The film received mixed to negative reviews, but was a box office success grossing $119.7 million worldwide. The following year she starred in the drama film The End of Violence. In 1997 she received an Honorary César at the 22nd César Awards. In 1998 she appeared in the independent drama Shadrach and returned to the romantic comedy genre with Just the Ticket, also making her producing debut. In 1999, MacDowell appeared in another box office disappointment, science fiction comedy film Muppets from Space, and starred opposite Albert Brooks in his directed comedy film, The Muse.

=== 2000–2009: Career fluctuations ===
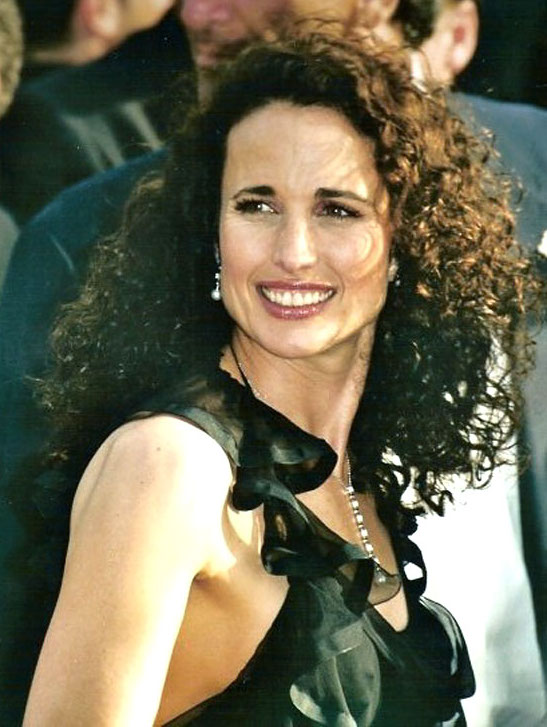
MacDowell at the 2003 Cannes Film Festival

In 2000, MacDowell starred in the war drama film Harrison's Flowers. The film received mixed reviews, but Roger Ebert praised her performance writing: "Andie MacDowell is a sympathetic actress who finds plausible ways to occupy this implausible role." The following year she appeared in two romantic comedy films: Town & Country alongside Warren Beatty and Diane Keaton, and received star-billing in Crush. After 12 release date changes, Town & Country was released in theaters on April 27, 2001, nearly three years after filming began, receiving negative reviews from critics and was one of the biggest box office flops in American film history, grossing a little over $10 million worldwide from a $105 million budget. Also in 2001, she made her first television appearance in more that ten years starring in the anthology film On the Edge and the Primetime Emmy Award-nominated comedy-drama Dinner with Friends. The following year she starred in the unsuccessful CBS drama pilot Jo, playing the title character. Also that year she starred in the action thriller film Ginostra.

During the 2000s, MacDowell acted primarily on television and in independent films. In 2003, she guest-starred in an episode of ABC legal drama series The Practice. In 2005 she made her return to the big screen, playing a supporting role in the comedy film Beauty Shop. She also starred in the Irish drama film Tara Road, and the Anjelica Huston-directed Hallmark Hall of Fame television film Riding the Bus with My Sister. She later appeared in the films Intervention (2007), Inconceivable (2008), and The Six Wives of Henry Lefay (2009).

=== 2010–2019: Supporting roles ===
In 2010, MacDowell starred in two Lifetime Television movies based on the books of the same name by Patricia Cornwell: At Risk and The Front, and had the recurring role in the short-lived Fox drama series Lone Star. The following year she played supporting roles in the films Monte Carlo and Footloose. In 2012 she starred in the comedy-drama film Mighty Fine. Also in 2012, she co-starred in the short-lived ABC Family comedy-drama series Jane by Design, and guest-starred on 30 Rock. From 2013 to 2015, she appeared in the Hallmark Channel drama series Cedar Cove, based on Debbie Macomber's book series of the same name.

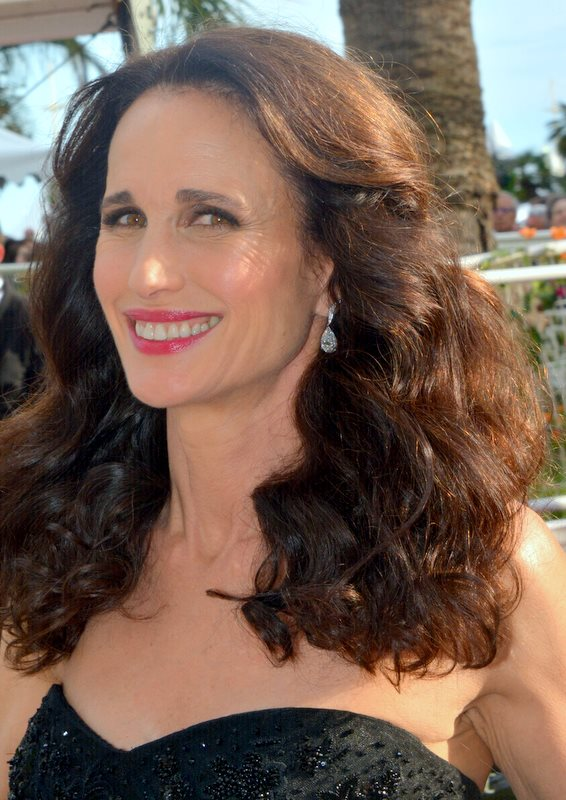
MacDowell at the Cannes Film Festival in 2017

In 2015, MacDowell played a "cougar" in the comedy-drama film Magic Mike XXL. The following year she starred in the ABC drama pilot Model Woman, which is inspired by the Ford Models agency and the notorious modeling wars of the 1970s. The following year she received rave reviews for her leading performance in the independent drama film Love After Love. David Ehrlich from IndieWire wrote in his review: "Andie MacDowell Gives the Performance of Her Life" while Nell Minow called her "a radiant", and Jeannette Catsoulis of The New York Times "a remarkable". Also that year she co-starred in the films Only the Brave and Christmas Inheritance, and returned to Hallmark with the television movie At Home in Mitford. In 2018, MacDowell starred in and produced the Hallmark Hall of Fame film The Beach House, directed by Roger Spottiswoode and based on the novel by Mary Alice Monroe. Also in 2018, she co-starred in the romantic drama Paper Year.

In 2019, MacDowell co-starred opposite Richard Dreyfuss and Chevy Chase in the comedy film The Last Laugh for Netflix. Later that year she appeared in the black comedy horror film Ready or Not, The film was a critical and commercial success. In 2019, she also starred in the BBC sitcom Cuckoo, and appeared in the Hulu miniseries Four Weddings and a Funeral.

=== 2020–present ===
In 2020, MacDowell starred in the survival thriller television series Wireless and the romantic comedy television film Dashing in December. She later starred opposite Frank Grillo in the Western film No Man's Land and guest-starred an episode of NBC sitcom Mr. Mayor playing a fictionalized version of herself. In 2021, MacDowell starred alongside her daughter, Margaret Qualley, in the Netflix miniseries Maid, playing her mother with an undiagnosed mental health disorder. For her performance, MacDowell received positive reviews from critics, and a Golden Globe nomination for Best Supporting Actress – Series, Miniseries or Television Film. The following year she appeared in the films Along for the Ride and Good Girl Jane. In 2023 she starred in the comedy-drama film My Happy Ending, playing a famous star who finds herself in a British hospital room with three other women who help her.

In 2023, MacDowell began starring in the Hallmark Channel fantasy drama series, The Way Home. Later in 2023 she appeared in the romantic comedy film The Other Zoey and in 2024 starred opposite Orlando Bloom in the action thriller Red Right Hand. Marya E. Gates, in her review for RogerEbert.com, wrote: "MacDowell also reaches these rarified heights, giving her best performances in years. Reigning over her kingdom from a large red brick mansion, complete with a roaring fireplace, oak-paneled built-in bookcases, and leather armchairs, Big Cat is the kind of baddie who cuts the thumbs off of men who cross her with her own shears in one scene, then uses the hot bodies of her underlings for sexual pleasure in the next. And MacDowell savors every line. A southern broad herself, she knows the power of a whisper and a threat veiled in niceties."

On November 20, 2025, Deadline announced that MacDowell would appear in a Netflix film adaptation of Katherine Center's novel The Bodyguard.

In 2026, MacDowell was announced to star in the indie comedy television series The Right Side, created by Max Talisman. The series centers on a politically divided family navigating public life and personal relationships.

== Personal life ==
In 1986, MacDowell married Paul Qualley, a rancher and fellow former model. The two met while posing for Gap ads. They share a son, Justin, and two daughters, Rainey, an actress and singer, and Margaret, also an actress.

MacDowell and Qualley divorced in 1999. Following her divorce from Qualley, MacDowell entered a year-long relationship with actor Dennis Quaid. In 1999, MacDowell reconnected with a former high school classmate, Rhett Hartzog. They married in November 2001, and divorced in October 2004. As of 2013, she resided in Marina del Rey, California. Since 2023, she has resided on the coast of South Carolina.

== Awards and nominations ==
Organizations	Year	Category	Project	Result	Ref.
César Awards	1997	Honorary César	Herself	Honored	
Chicago Film Critics Association	1989	Best Actress	Sex, Lies, and Videotape	Nominated	
Chicago Film Critics Association	1993	Best Supporting Actress	Short Cuts	Nominated	
David di Donatello	1994	Best Foreign Actress	Four Weddings and a Funeral	Nominated	
Golden Globe Awards	1989	Best Actress – Motion Picture Drama	Sex, Lies, and Videotape	Nominated	
Golden Globe Awards	1990	Best Actress – Motion Picture Musical or Comedy	Green Card	Nominated	
Golden Globe Awards	1993	Special Ensemble Cast Award	Short Cuts	Won	
Golden Globe Awards	1994	Best Actress – Motion Picture Musical or Comedy	Four Weddings and a Funeral	Nominated	
Golden Globe Awards	2021	Best Supporting Actress – Series, Miniseries or Television Film	Maid	Nominated	
Independent Spirit Award	1989	Best Female Lead	Sex, Lies, and Videotape	Won	
Los Angeles Film Critics Association	1989	Best Actress	Sex, Lies, and Videotape	Won	
National Society of Film Critics	1989	Best Actress	Sex, Lies, and Videotape	3rd place	
New York Film Critics Circle	1989	Best Actress	Sex, Lies, and Videotape	3rd place	
Saturn Awards	1993	Saturn Award for Best Actress	Groundhog Day	Won	
Venice International Film Festival	1993	Volpi Cup for Best Ensemble Cast	Short Cuts	Won	
