= Doña Bárbara (disambiguation) =

Doña Bárbara is a novel by Venezuelan author Rómulo Gallegos.

Doña Bárbara may also refer to:

- Doña Bárbara (1943 film), a 1943 Mexican romantic drama film
- Doña Bárbara (1998 film), a 1998 Argentine-Spanish romantic drama film
- Doña Bárbara, 1967 opera by Caroline Lloyd with a libretto by Isaac Chocrón and orchestrations by Hershy Kay
- Doña Bárbara (1967 TV series), a Venezuelan telenovela
- Doña Bárbara (1975 TV series), a Venezuelan telenovela
- Doña Bárbara (2008 TV series), a Spanish-language telenovela
