= Waking the Dead =

Waking the Dead may refer to:

- Waking the Dead (L.A. Guns album)
- Waking the Dead (The Clay People album)
- Waking the Dead (novel), a novel by Scott Spencer
- Waking the Dead (film), a 2000 US film, starring Jennifer Connelly and Billy Crudup, based on the Scott Spencer novel
- Waking the Dead (TV series), a BBC television series, starring Trevor Eve and Sue Johnston
