= Chocrón =

Chocrón is a surname. Notable people with the surname include:

- Isaac Chocrón (1930–2011), Venezuelan economist, playwright, and translator
- Sonia Chocrón (born 1961), Venezuelan poet, novelist, screenwriter, and playwright, relative of Isaac
