= The Garden of Eden (novel) =

1986 posthumous novel by Ernest Hemingway

- First edition cover
- Author: Ernest Hemingway
- Language: English
- Publisher: Charles Scribner's Sons
- Publication date: 1986
- Publication place: United States
- Media type: Print (Book)
- Pages: 247
- ISBN: 0-684-18693-4

The Garden of Eden is the second posthumously released novel of Ernest Hemingway, published in 1986. Hemingway started the novel in 1946 and worked on the manuscript for the next 15 years, during which time he also wrote The Old Man and the Sea, The Dangerous Summer, A Moveable Feast, and Islands in the Stream.

== Plot summary ==
The novel is fundamentally the story of five months in the lives of David Bourne, an American writer, and his wife Catherine. It is set mainly in the French Riviera, specifically in the Côte d'Azur, and in Spain. The story begins with their honeymoon in the Camargue, then moves to Spain, then back to France (at a "long low rose-colored Provençal house where they had stayed before... in the pines on the Estérel side of la Napoule" (within easy driving distance to Cannes). However, early in the book, Catherine seemed to change (from David's point of view—the novel is entirely from his vantage). While at le Grau du Roi, Catherine announces "I have a big surprise," but does not tell David what it is other than to hint "Oh it's very simple but it's very complicated" and "...I'm going to be changed." She bicycles into town, then returns with "Her hair... cropped as short as a boy's." Later, that night, she tells him "Don't call me girl." and "Please love me David the way I am." and implies that he is changing also ("You are changing," she said. "Oh you are. You are. Yes you are and you're my girl Catherine.")

While in Spain, Catherine twice acts jealous about David reading clippings of reviews of his latest book—rudely saying "you clipping reader" the second time—and they have a mild spat. (He: "Why don't you just shut up about the clippings." She: "Why should I shut up? Just because you wrote this morning? Do you think I married you because you're a writer? You and your clippings.")

After their return to France, the Bournes soon meet a young woman named Marita, with whom they both fall in love. Catherine seemingly continues to explore gender roles, while David gets increasingly uncomfortable. Both Catherine and David sleep with Marita, although not at the same time. David's relationship with his wife deteriorates as she stops adhering to the gender roles expected of her—sometimes acting jealous of both Marita and his work, and other times encouraging it. Meanwhile, Marita gradually transitions into the supporting wife role.

It eventually develops that Catherine only wants David to work on what is referred to as the "narrative,” which is apparently a narrative of their lives, and not his "stories," tales of his childhood and his father. (Catherine characterizes the "stories" as "The dreary dismal little stories about your adolescence with your bogus drunken father.") David (who has been somewhat passive in his reactions so far) really starts to react, however, when Catherine suddenly declares that she had "made decisions and planned things," which turns out to mean that she's going to "have the [narrative] manuscript typed up to where it is now and see about getting illustrations." David takes this as interference in his work ("And if I don't want it copied yet?") and gets very upset. He tells Catherine "I'm sick of all of it, Devil [his private name for her]. Sick all the way through me."

It culminates when Catherine tells David while they are on the beach that she burned the press clippings. After they return to where they are staying, he finds that the stories he had written are missing too while the "narrative" is intact. "Now he knew that it had happened but still thought it might be some ghastly joke." Catherine confirms that she destroyed the "stories" too: "They were worthless and I hated them." It later develops that she burned them beyond recovery. David is stunned, but lashes out "I'm sorry I ever met you. I'm sorry I ever married you--." Catherine then announces that she is going to leave for Paris "to see about artists for the book [the "narrative"]" and that she will pay him for the destroyed "stories". Although she says that she loves him and will return, the ending implies a separation of David and Catherine is imminent.

== Major themes ==
The Garden of Eden indicates Hemingway's exploration of male-female relationships, shows an interest in androgynous characters, and "the reversal of gender roles."

Hemingway biographer James Mellow argues the "ideas of sexual transference" did not become clear in Hemingway's fiction until he wrote The Garden of Eden. Catherine Bourne convinces David to dye his hair the color of hers, "so they are twins, summer-tanned and androgynous."

== Background and publication history ==
Mellow argues the genesis of the story began during Hemingway's honeymoon with his second wife, Pauline Pfeiffer, and shortly after his divorce from Hadley Richardson. The male protagonist's depiction as a young writer, and the woman's depiction as "attractive, exciting, wealthy" mirrored the days spent in Le Grau-du-Roi with Pauline.

The novel was published posthumously in a much-abridged form in 1986. Hemingway began The Garden of Eden in 1946 and wrote 800 pages. For 15 years, he continued to work on the novel which remained uncompleted. The manuscript of The Garden of Eden "exists in three irreconcilable drafts of varying lengths", the longest of which was chosen to be the basis for the published text. When published in 1986, the novel had 30 chapters and 70,000 words. The publisher's note explains that cuts were made to the novel, and according to biographers, Hemingway had achieved 48 chapters and 200,000 words. Scribner's removed as much as two-thirds of the extant manuscript and one long subplot.

The Garden of Eden, Hemingway's ninth novel, was published in 1986, a quarter century after his death. Scribner's published the novel in May 1986 with a first print-run of 100,000 copies.

== Reception ==
The publication of The Garden of Eden is controversial because of the editing of the manuscript. Susan Seitz argues that in this novel Hemingway was forging a new direction that was lost in the editing. She believes the editing was substandard, with "substantial cuts of lines, scenes, and whole chapters, the addition of manuscript material that Hemingway had discarded, and transposed scenes and dialogue." The result, she claims, does not "represent Hemingway's intentions in these works as he left them." In The New Republic, Barbara Probst Solomon decried it as a “travesty”, saying “I can report that Hemingway’s publisher has committed a literary crime.”

Nevertheless, the novel was included alongside A Farewell to Arms and The Sun Also Rises on Harold Bloom's list of books comprising the Western canon.

=== Film adaptation ===
A film adaptation of The Garden of Eden was released in 2008 at the RomaCinemaFest and had a limited investors' screening in the UK. Screen International dubbed the film "a boundaries-breaking erotic drama." The film went on general release in select theaters in December 2010. The ensemble cast featured Jack Huston, Mena Suvari, Caterina Murino, Richard E. Grant, and Carmen Maura. It was directed by John Irvin. The adaptation was by James Scott Linville, former editor of The Paris Review. In March 2011, the film went on sale on iTunes and with other vendors.
