= Allan Scott (Scottish screenwriter) =

Scottish screenwriter and producer

- Born: Allan Shiach; 16 September 1939 (age 86); Elgin, Moray, Scotland
- Occupations: Screenwriter and producer
- Years active: 1970–present

Allan Shiach, (born 16 September 1939) who writes and produces under the pseudonym Allan Scott, is a Scottish screenwriter and producer, and former Scotch whisky executive. He was nominated for BAFTA's Alexander Korda Award for Best British Film and two Genie Awards for his 1997 film Regeneration. He has won the Edgar Award (1976) and Writers' Guild Award (1978). He was executive producer and co-creator of the Netflix series The Queen's Gambit, a longtime collaborator of Nicolas Roeg, including co-writing his films Don't Look Now and The Witches.

== Biography ==
=== Early life ===
Allan Scott was born in Elgin, Moray, son of Leslie (a lawyer) and Lucie Shiach. His father died in a car accident when Scott was 8. He was educated at Gordonstoun School and McGill University, Montreal, where he obtained a BA(Hons) in English Literature. After training in the Scotch whisky industry, he worked as a writer for television both in the UK and the US during the 1970s whilst at the same time as serving as a non-executive director of Macallan-Glenlivet plc.

=== Career ===
He was chairman and chief executive of Macallan-Glenlivet from 1979 until the company was sold in 1997, and during this 18-year period the company's reputation for innovative and focused marketing and management had helped it to establish a highly successful, international brand of single malt whisky and increased its stock market value more six hundredfold. The company won the Queen's Award for Export on three occasions.

He served for several years on the Broadcasting Council of BBC Scotland and in 1986 succeeded Sir Denis Forman as chairman of the Scottish Film Production Fund. His subsequent chairmanship of the Scottish Film Council lasted for six years and following upon that body's initiative to create a new, broadly-based organisation for the Scottish screen industries, comprising the Film Archive, Media Education, Exhibition, Screen Locations and Production Fund; he was appointed chairman of the new organisation named Scottish Screen. Having chaired the interim board which supervised the transition and consolidation, he remained as chairman for a further year before stepping down in 1998, after twelve years of involvement with Scotland's filmmaking bodies.

While continuing his career as a screenwriter and producer, he was also a director of both Caledonian Newspapers and Scottish Television plc, and when the companies merged to form SMG plc he remained on the board for thirteen years. He was appointed a governor of the British Film Institute in 1992 and served that board for some six years. He is also a former chairman of the Writers' Guild of Great Britain, thus perhaps the only person ever to chair a trades union and a Stock Exchange company at the same time.

He was executive producer of the thriller Shallow Grave (1994). He also wrote and produced the BAFTA-nominated film Regeneration (1997), as well as The Fourth Angel (2001). He has written or co-written more than a dozen films, including The Awakening (with Chris Bryant, 1980) and five films directed by Nicolas Roeg: Don't Look Now (with Chris Bryant, 1973), Castaway (1986), The Witches (1990), Cold Heaven (1991) and Two Deaths (1995). He was also co-writer of The Preacher's Wife (1996) and In Love and War (1996). Scott was co-writer and script consultant on the Norwegian film Kon-Tiki (2012), which was nominated for an Oscar in 2013 in the foreign language category.

He is the originator, co-producer and co-writer of the stage musical adaptation of the 1990s film The Adventures of Priscilla, Queen of the Desert, which opened in Sydney in October 2006 and has since become the most successful Australian stage musical of all time. Productions in over 30 cities have grossed a nearly $US500 million. The London production of the show ran for three years before it was launched in North America, beginning in Toronto prior to Broadway, where it was nominated for two Tony Awards. Other productions are being presented regularly in major centres around the world. It is the winner of 5 Australian Green Room Awards, an Olivier Award and the What's on Stage Award for Best New Musical, a Tony Award in the US, and in Canada 6 Broadway World awards and the Toronto Theatre Critics Award. In Italy it has won 4 DAPA Awards and in Argentina 7 awards. It has also won 12 Hugo Awards including Best Musical and 10 awards in Spain. In France it won a Best Musical Cristal Award.

He was executive producer and co-creator of the Netflix series The Queen's Gambit, adapted from the Walter Tevis novel of the same name, which Scott acquired the rights for in 1992, and directed by Scott Frank.

He has been awarded honorary doctorates by Napier University, Edinburgh (2007) and by Aberdeen University (2008), and is visiting professor of film at Edinburgh Napier.

== Personal life ==
Scott married actress Kathleen Breck on 12 November 1966 and they have 3 children.

== Filmography ==
Year	Title	Director	Writer	Producer	Notes
1970	The Man Who Had Power Over Women	John Krish	Yes	No	
1973	Don't Look Now	Nicolas Roeg	Yes	No	
1974	The Girl from Petrovka	Robert Ellis Miller	Yes	No	
1975	The Spiral Staircase	Peter Collinson	Yes	No	
1977	Golden Rendezvous	Ashley Lazarus	Yes	No	
1977	Joseph Andrews	Tony Richardson	Yes	No	
1980	The Awakening	Mike Newell	Yes	No	
1982	Tenebrae	Dario Argento	No	Yes	
1985	Martin's Day	Alan Gibson	Yes	No	
1985	D.A.R.Y.L.	Simon Wincer	Yes	No	
1986	Castaway	Nicolas Roeg	Yes	No	
1988	Apprentice to Murder	Ralph L. Thomas	Yes	No	
1988	Taffin	Francis Megahy	No	Executive	
1988	Beryl Markham: A Shadow on the Sun	Tony Richardson	Yes	No	TV Movie
1990	The Witches	Nicolas Roeg	Yes	No	
1991	Cold Heaven	Nicolas Roeg	Yes	Yes	
1994	Shallow Grave	Danny Boyle	No	Executive	
1995	Fallen Angels	Peter Bogdanovich	Yes	No	TV Series: 1 Episode
1995	Two Deaths	Nicolas Roeg	Yes	Executive	
1996	Samson and Delilah	Nicolas Roeg	Yes	No	TV Movie
1996	The Preacher's Wife	Penny Marshall	Yes	No	
1996	In Love and War	Richard Attenborough	Yes	No	
1996	True Blue	Ferdinand Fairfax	No	Executive	
1997	Regeneration	Gillies MacKinnon	Yes	Yes	
1999	The Match	Mick Davis	No	Yes	
1999	Grizzly Falls	Stewart Raffill	No	Yes	
2001	The Fourth Angel	John Irvin	Yes	Yes	
2017	How It Really Happened	Brett Kelly	No	No	Interviewee; Episode: "What Killed Heath Ledger?
2020	The Queen's Gambit	Scott Frank	Yes	Executive	Co-Creator; TV Series: 7 Episodes
2022	Minsky	Sam Barlow	Yes	No	
2022	Immortality	Sam Barlow	Yes	No	Video Game
