= Caroline Lloyd =

American composer and pianist (1924–1980)

- Caroline Lloyd, c. 1967
- Born: Caroline Grace Parkhurst; 12 April 1924; Uniontown, Alabama, US
- Died: 1980 (aged 55–56)
- Occupations: Composer; pianist; music director
- Works: List of compositions

Caroline Grace Parkhurst Lloyd (April 12, 1924 – 1980) was an American composer, pianist and music director. Her best-known composition was the Spanish-language opera Doña Bárbara performed in the Teatro Municipal of Caracas, July 1967. The opera's libretto was provided by Isaac Chocrón and orchestrated by Hershy Kay. Other compositions include works for voice, solo piano and chamber ensemble; of note is the Seis canciones de los paises bolivarianos (lit. 'Six songs of the Bolivar countries').

== Life and career ==
External audio
- Lloyd's Paisajes, arranged for orchestra by Hobart Earle
- Performance by the Odessa Philharmonic Orchestra under Earle

Caroline Grace Parkhurst was born in Uniontown, Alabama, US, on April 12, 1924. The daughter of "Mr. and Ms. T. Harmon Parkhurst", she was raised in Santa Fe, New Mexico. She received a Bachelor of Music from the University of New Mexico (UNM) in 1945, after piano study with both Nina Ancona and George Robert, and composition study with John Donald Robb. Her UNM education was partially funded by a scholarship from the Sigma Iota fraternity. At UNM she met Andrew Richard Lloyd, whom she married in 1946, adopting her husband's surname. The Lloyds had four children: Timothy, Angela, Richard and Christopher. Like her mother, Angela later pursued a career in the arts as a storyteller-entertainer.

Caroline Lloyd later studied with Bernard Rogers at the Eastman School of Music. As a composer and pianist, Lloyd had taught privately since 1946, which she continued to do in Caracas, Venezuela, where the family moved in 1951. In Caracas, Lloyd was musical director of El Centro Venezolano Americano (the Venezuelan American Center) from 1955 to 1968.

Lloyd's time in Caracas saw a flurry of composition activity. Her Six Songs—in full, the Seis canciones de los paises bolivarianos (lit. 'Six songs of the Bolivar countries')—were premiered at the Sala de Conciertos of the Central University of Venezuela, shortly before 1965. The Six Songs received later performances at the UNM (c. 1965) and Schenectady, New York (1967). Other vocal works were written in 1968: the Three Songs to texts by Federico García Lorca and the Two Songs to texts by José Ramón Medina. Lloyd composed her best known work in Caracas, the opera Doña Barbara, celebrating the city's 400th anniversary. She began composing the work in 1964, finishing in November 1966; it was premiered in July 1967 at the Teatro Municipal of Caracas. Based on the eponymous novel by Rómulo Gallegos, the Venezuelan writer Isaac Chocrón wrote the libretto, while American arranger Hershy Kay orchestrated the work.

After returning to the US, Lloyd studied at Columbia University with Donata Fornuto, Arpad Szabo and Charles Wuorinen. She continued to teach until her graduation in 1973, when Lloyd and her family moved to Palma de Mallorca, Spain; Andrew worked in Algeria, joining the family on weekends. After a year and a half, the family moved to Quito, Ecuador, returning to the United States in 1977. Caroline Lloyd died in 1980.

== List of compositions ==
List of compositions by Caroline Lloyd
Title	Year	Genre	OCLC	Notes
"Calle de Elvira"	?	Vocal	–	Child's voice and piano
Doña Barbara	1967	Opera	–	Libretto by Isaac Chocrón; based on the eponymous novel
"Granada"	?	Vocal	–	Child's voice and piano
Paisajes	1972	Piano	OCLC 4794545	Suite for solo piano
Seis canciones de los paises bolivarianos (Six songs of the Bolivar countries)	1965	Vocal	OCLC 26582285	Voice and piano
Song	1978	Chamber	OCLC 224539371	For double bass and piano. Dedicated to David Walter
Suite after James Thurber	1945	Piano	OCLC 15693852	Revised in 1964
Three Songs	1966	Vocal	–	Text by Federico García Lorca
Two Songs	1968	Vocal	–	Text by José Ramón Medina
