= The Garden of Eden (2008 film) =

- Theatrical release poster
- Directed by: John Irvin
- Written by: James Scott Linville
- Based on: The Garden of Eden by Ernest Hemingway
- Produced by: Tim Lewiston; Bob Mahoney
- Starring: Mena Suvari; Jack Huston; Caterina Murino
- Cinematography: Ashley Rowe
- Edited by: Jeremy Gibbs
- Music by: Roger Julià
- Production companies: Tranquil Seas; Devonshire Productions; Berwick Street Prods; Freeform Spain
- Distributed by: Roadside Attractions
- Release dates: October 26, 2008 (RFF); December 10, 2010 (U.S.)
- Running time: 96 minutes
- Countries: United Kingdom; Spain
- Language: English
- Box office: $22,083

The Garden of Eden (also known as Hemingway's Garden of Eden) is a 2008 thriller drama film directed by John Irvin and starring Mena Suvari, Jack Huston and Caterina Murino. It is based on the 1986 posthumously published novel of the same name by Ernest Hemingway.

Development on the film began in June 2007, and filming started the same month. Suvari, Huston, and Murino were cast as the film's leads.

The Garden of Eden had its worldwide premiere at the Rome Film Festival on October 26, 2008. The film received a limited release from Roadside Attractions in the United States on December 10, 2010, and received generally negative reviews from critics.

== Plot ==
Set in the late 1920s, David Bourne is an American writer and World War I veteran who meets and marries the alluring Catherine Hill after a whirlwind romance in Paris, France. They travel on a long honeymoon through the south of France and into Spain where David plans to write his next book; a non-fiction piece about his travels in Africa as a child with his explorer father who was also into big game hunting. Catherine soon becomes restless with David over his focused attention to writing and begins to play a series of mind games with him. Catherine grows more mentally unbalanced as she pushes David's patience and devotion to her in which she convinces David to dye his hair bleach-blonde, the color of hers, "so they are twins, summer-tanned and androgynous." They have sex then argue. David becomes both uncomfortable and curious when Catherine meets and brings a sultry Italian woman, named Marita, into their marriage to spice things up with both of them having sexual relations with Marita (but never at the same time). The erotic mind games David and Catherine play off against each other reach new levels when they use Marita to make each other jealous leading to Catherine indulging in more self-destructive behavior.

== Cast ==
- Mena Suvari as Catherine Hill Bourne
- Jack Huston as David Bourne
- Caterina Murino as Marita
- Richard E. Grant as Colonel Philip Boyle
- Matthew Modine as David's Father
- Carmen Maura as Madame Aurol

== Production ==
In June 2007, John Irvin announced he would be directing a film adaptation of Ernest Hemingway's posthumous and final novel The Garden of Eden. Mena Suvari, Jack Huston, and Caterina Murino were cast as the film's leads, Catherine Bourne, David Bourne, and Marita, respectively. Filming began the same month.

The film was produced and financed by United Kingdom-based film studio Berwick Street Prods. Tranquil Seas, Devonshire Productions, and Freeform Spain also helped produce the film.

== Release ==
The Garden of Eden premiered at the Rome Film Festival on October 26, 2008.

In October 2010, two years after its premiere, Roadside Attractions announced that they had obtained the distribution rights to The Garden of Eden. The film received a limited theatrical release on December 10, 2010.

Suvari has publicly expressed her disdain with the length between the film's premiere and its theatrical release.

=== Home media ===
The Garden of Eden was released on DVD on March 15, 2011.

== Reception ==
=== Box office ===
The Garden of Eden began a limited release in theaters in the United States on December 10, 2010. In its first weekend, the film grossed $12,404 from 14 theaters. The film ended its box office run with a gross of $22,083.

=== Critical response ===
The film has a 4% approval rating on Rotten Tomatoes based on 24 reviews, with an average rating of 3.9/10. The website's critics consensus reads: "Garden of Eden dramatizes Ernest Hemingway's clipped storytelling without carrying over the intelligence that undergirded the author's writing, yielding a thin drama full of artifice and no feeling." Metacritic, which sampled nine critics and calculated a weighted average score of 28 out of 100, reported that the film received "generally unfavorable reviews". Jesse Cataldo of Slant Magazine gave the film one and a half stars. Noel Murray of The A.V. Club graded the film a D+.
