= Robin Neillands =

British writer

Robin Hunter Neillands (3 December 1935 – 30 January 2006) was a British writer, born in Glasgow, who specialized in travel and military history. He also wrote under several pen names: Robin Hunter, Rob Hunter, Neil Lands and Debbie Hunter.

== Biography ==
Neillands served, as a conscript, in 45 Commando Royal Marines in Cyprus and the Middle East. Afterwards, as a salesman for Pan Books, he travelled widely. In Britain, he founded Spur Books and through them published his early travel guides to France. One of his many journeys, cycling the Way of St. James pilgrim trail to Santiago de Compostela in Spain, led to another book and also to the Confraternity of Saint James, the London-based pilgrim association. Other journeys, on foot, also generated popular travel books and newspaper articles.

His 20th-century military histories are very readable, containing rigorous detail as well as many first-hand recollections of veterans—they can be considered both academic and popular. Neillands did not resist expressing strong personal views and backed them up with cogent evidence. He was keen to expose revisionist 'myths' about World War II, many of which he perceived to have originated in America, in particular the denigration of Bernard Montgomery and British/Canadian forces in Normandy in 1944. Furthermore, his formidable book The Bomber War rejected accusations that the Allied bombing campaign was unnecessarily excessive, and he also expressed criticism of the execution of the 1942 Dieppe Raid.

The Great War Generals of the Western Front made assessments of World War I generals (particularly in the British Army) that run contrary to popular conceptions of universal incompetence and stupidity.

Neillands received his BA and MA in 2002 and 2003, respectively. He was nominated for the Royal United Services Institute/ Duke of Westminster's gold medal for Military Literature, for his book The Bomber War.

A biography of Bernard Montgomery was in preparation at his death.

His second wife Judith, whom he married in 1995, and his two daughters Alexandra and Claire from his first marriage survived him when he died on 3 January 2006.

== Bibliography ==
His 90-plus books include:

- Dordogne (1975)
- Languedoc and Roussillon (1976)
- Burgundy (1977)
- Brittany (1979)
- Royal Marine Commandos 1942-82 (1987)
- The Road to Compostella (1987)
- Walking Through France (1988)
- The Hundred Years' War (1990)
- Walking Through Spain (1991)
- The Wars of the Roses (1992)
- Walking Through Ireland (1993)
- D-Day: Voices from Normandy (1993)
- Wellington and Napoleon (1994)
- Walking Through Scotland (1995)
- Conquest of the Reich (1995)
- The Dervish Wars (1996)
- A Fighting Retreat: Military Campaigns in the British Empire 1947-97 (1996)
- The Great War Generals 1914-1918 (1996)
- The Bomber War (2001)
- The Battle of Normandy 1944 (2002)
- The Old Contemptibles: The British Expeditionary Force, 1914 (2004)
- Eighth Army 1939-45 (2004)
- The Dieppe Raid 1942 (2005)
- The Battle for the Rhine 1944 (2005)
- The Death of Glory: The Western Front 1915 (2006)

Also, as "Robin Hunter":

- The Fourth Angel (1985) ISBN 978-0-7535-0650-9 – became the basis for a feature film directed by John Irvin and starring Jeremy Irons and Charlotte Rampling
- Quarry's Contract (1987)
- The London Connection (1990)
