= Caterina Murino =

Italian actress (born 1977)

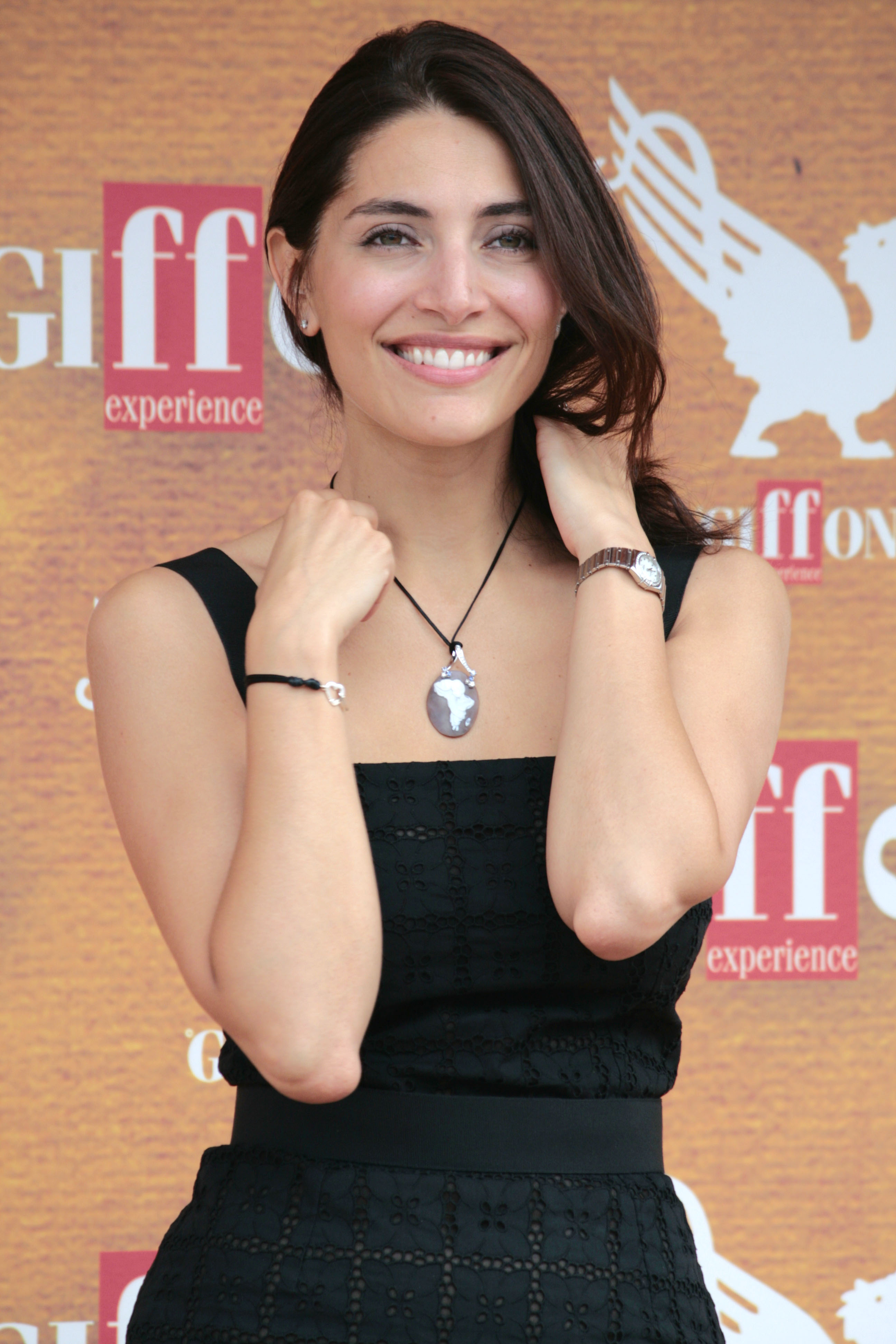
- Murino on July 26, 2010
- Born: 15 September 1977 (age 49); Cagliari, Italy
- Occupation: Actress
- Years active: 1999–present
- Partner: Édouard Rigaud (2017–present)
- Children: 1

Caterina Murino (born 15 September 1977) is an Italian actress. She began her acting career in the 1999 production of the play Richard III and later made her breakthrough with the 2004 film The Corsican File. She went on to appear in the 2006 film Casino Royale and received a European Golden Globe at the 2008 Italian Golden Globe Awards.

== Early life and career ==
Murino was born in Cagliari, Sardinia, and initially wanted to become a doctor. In 1997 she participated in the Miss Italy contest and finished fifth. Between 1999 and 2000 she studied drama at the Scuola di Cinema e Teatro run by Francesca De Sapio. She then appeared in stage productions of Richard III and Italian-language plays.

In 2002 Italian director Dino Risi cast Murino in the television film Le ragazze di Miss Italia. She made her feature film debut the same year in Nowhere (2002), directed by Chilean writer and filmmaker Luis Sepúlveda, which received positive reviews in France. In 2004, she appeared in the French film Il bandito corso alongside Christian Clavier and Jean Reno, marking the beginning of her French acting career.

Murino gained international fame after playing Solange Dimitrios in the 2006 adaptation of the James Bond novel Casino Royale.

In early 2011, she co-starred with Rufus Sewell in the short-lived BBC One TV series Zen.

In 2011, she also appeared in Bob Sinclar's music video clip Far l'amore. She also starred in the video clip of the famous party band The Gypsy Queens' "l'Italiano".

In 2013, she starred as Penelope, Ulysses' wife for a TV production Odysseus.

In 2023, she hosted the 80th Venice International Film Festival from 30 August to 9 September.

== Personal life ==
Since 2017, Murino has been in a relationship with French attorney, Édouard Rigaud. In July 2025, she revealed that she was expecting the couple's first child, a boy, who was conceived via IVF. Murino also revealed that she had suffered two miscarriages in the past. On August 21, 2025, her son was born, named Demetrio Tancredi Rigaud Murino.

== Filmography ==
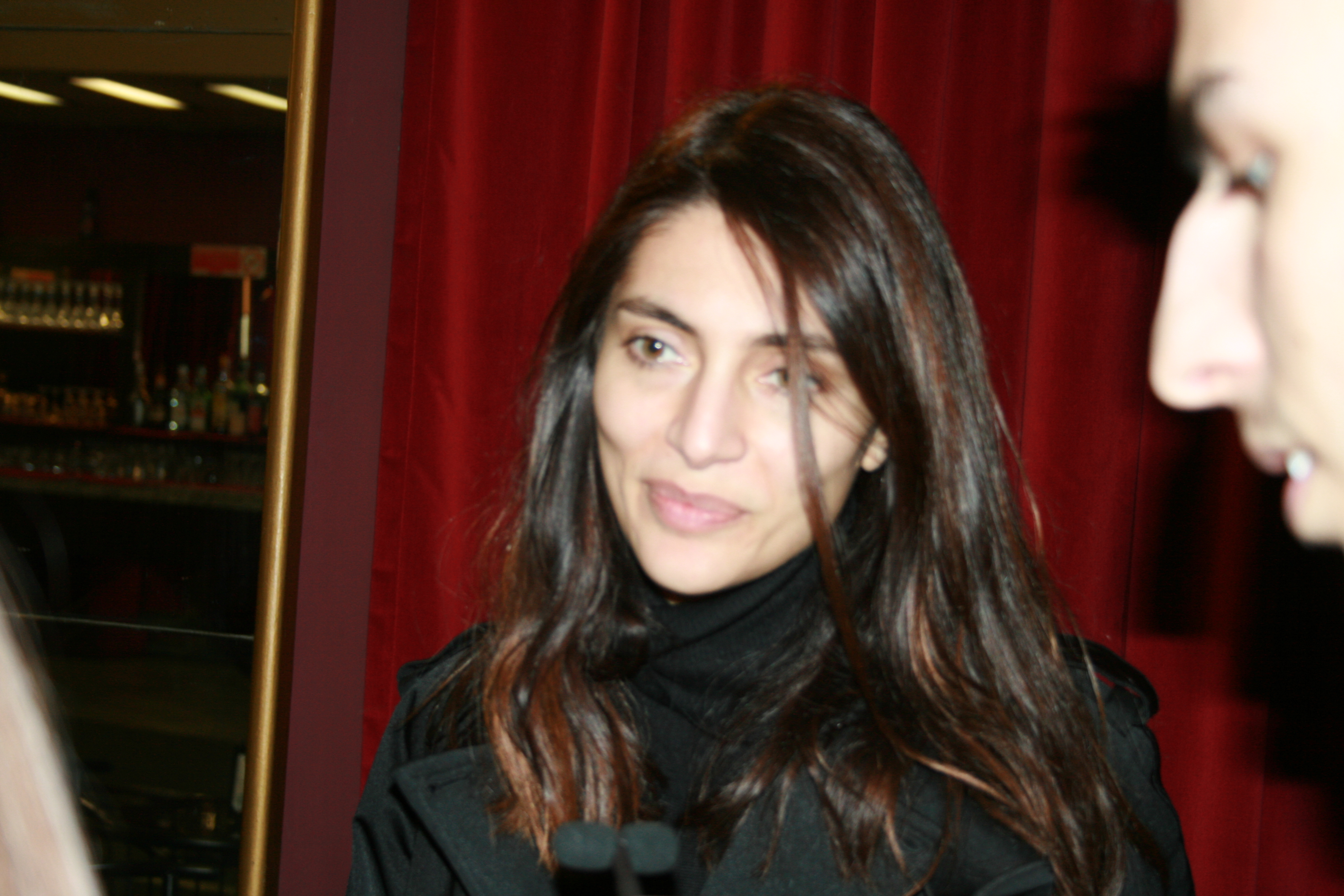
Murino in March 2010

=== Film ===
Year	Title	Role(s)	Director	Notes
2001	Nowhere	Dream woman	Luis Sepúlveda	
2004	The Corsican File	Léa	Alain Berbérian	
2005	L'amour aux trousses	Valeria	Philippe de Chauveron	
2006	Casino Royale	Solange Dimitrios	Martin Campbell	
2006	French Fried Vacation 3	Elena	Patrice Leconte	
2007	Don't Think About It	Nadine	Gianni Zanasi	
2007	St. Trinian's	Miss Maupassant	Oliver Parker	
2008	The Great Alibi	Léa Mantovani	Pascal Bonitzer	
2008	The Seed of Discord	Veronica	Pappi Corsicato	
2008	The Garden of Eden	Marita	John Irvin	
2009	Toute ma vie	Alessandra	Pierre Ferrière	Short film
2010	Comme les cinq doigts de la main	Linda Hayoun	Alexandre Arcady	
2010	Die	Sofia Valenti	Dominic James	
2011	Équinoxe	Nathalie	Laurent Carcélès	
2011	The Prey	Anna Adrien	Éric Valette	
2012	Gabin le mime	Nina	Cyril Rigon	Short film
2014	L'automne de Zao	The Mother	Nikolaus Roche-Kresse	Short film
2015	The Invincible Piglet	Additional voices	Song Zhantao	Voice
2015	The Squad	Margaux	Benjamin Rocher	
2016	Ustica: The Missing Paper	Roberta Bellodi	Renzo Martinelli	
2016	We Are Family	Marie	Gabriel Laferrière	
2016	Fever	Irina Caro	Rajeev Jhaveri	
2017	Agadah	Princess M.S.	Alberto Rodndalli	
2017	Voice from the Stone	Malvina Rivi	Eric Howell	
2017	Et mon coeur transparent	Irina	David Vital-Durand	
2018	Se son rose	Benedetta	Leonardo Pieraccioni	
2019	Toute ressemblance	Elisa	Michel Denisot	
2021	My Brother, My Sister	Giada	Roberto Capucci	
2021	Il giudizio	Elena	Gianluca Mattei, Mario Sanzullo	
2021	Venicephrenia	Claudia	Álex de la Iglesia	
2021	Art of Love	Carmen Lindo	Betty Kaplan	
2022	Maestro(s)	Rebecca Martinelli	Bruno Chiche	
2025	Summer Night, Winter Moon	Antonia	Peter Field	
2025	After the War	Maria	Gavin J. Chalcraft	

=== Television ===
Year	Title	Role(s)	Network	Notes
1997	Miss Italia	Herself / Contestant	Rai 1	Annual beauty contest
1999	Passaparola	Herself / Co-host	Canale 5	Game show
2002	Il giovane Casanova	Zanetta	Canale 5	Television film
2002	Don Matteo	Sandra Lovati	Rai 1	Episode: "Il passato ritorna"
2004	Orgoglio	Franca Baldini	Rai 1	Main role (season 2)
2006	Vientos de agua	Sophie	Telecinco	6 episodes
2008	XIII: The Conspiracy	Sam Taylor	Canal+	Television film
2008	Donne assassine	Anna Maria	Fox Crime	Episode: "Anna Maria"
2011	Zen	Tania Moretti	BBC One	Main role
2011	XIII: The Series	Sam Taylor	Canal+	Main role (season 1)
2013	Odysseus	Penelope	Arte	Main role
2014	Taxi Brooklyn	Giada Giannini	NBC	4 episodes
2015	È arrivata la felicità	Claudia Medda	Rai 1	Main role (season 1)
2019	L'isola di Pietro	Teresa Orrù	Canale 5	Main role (season 3)
2019	Le temps est assassin	Palma Idrissi	TF1	Main role
2022–2023	Balthazar	Olivia Vésinet	TF1	Main role (seasons 4–5)
