= Of Love and Shadows (novel) =

1984 novel by Isabel Allende

- First edition
- Author: Isabel Allende
- Original title: De amor y de sombra
- Language: Spanish
- Publisher: Sudamericana
- Publication date: 1984
- Publication place: Chile
- Media type: Print (hardback & paperback)
- ISBN: 9788497592543

Of Love and Shadows (Spanish: De amor y de sombra) is a novel written by Chilean novelist Isabel Allende in 1984. The plotline was inspired by journalistic accounts taken from magazines, newspapers, and interviews that Allende herself gathered both working as a journalist in Chile before her exile and during her later career as a writer in Venezuela.

== Plot ==
Irene is a magazine editor living under the shadow of the Pinochet dictatorship in Chile. Francisco is a handsome photographer and he comes to Irene for a job. As a sympathizer with the underground resistance movement, Francisco opens her eyes and her heart to the atrocities being committed by the state. Irene and Francisco begin a passionate affair, ready to risk everything for the sake of justice and truth.

== Film ==
In 1994, this novel was adapted into a film starring Antonio Banderas and Jennifer Connelly.
