= Scott Spencer (writer) =

American author (born 1945)

- Born: September 1, 1945 (age 81); Washington, D.C., U.S.
- Education: University of Illinois; Roosevelt University; University of Wisconsin
- Occupations: Novelist, writer
- Children: Celeste Dupuy-Spencer
- Writing career
- Pen name: Chase Novak
- Language: English

Scott Spencer (born September 1, 1945) is an American author who has written fourteen novels. He also wrote the screenplay for the 1993 movie Father Hood. Two of Spencer's novels, Endless Love and Waking the Dead, have been adapted into films. Endless Love was first adapted into a motion picture by Franco Zeffirelli in 1981, and a second adaptation by Shana Feste was released in 2014. Waking the Dead was produced by Jodie Foster and directed by Keith Gordon in 2000. The novels Endless Love and A Ship Made of Paper were both nominated for the National Book Award, with Endless Love selling more than 2 million copies. Spencer has heavily panned both film adaptations of Endless Love.

In a contribution to The New York Times Book Review in 1980, Spencer said: "The general direction of the serious, literary novel may now be heading toward character and story, as novelists, in order to survive, take back from pulp fiction and the movies the rich subject matter which they so carelessly cast off, thinking they no longer needed it." Joyce Carol Oates, writing about A Ship Made of Paper in The New Yorker, said: "Like Cheever, Spencer has imagined for his ... infatuated lover melodramatic crises that verge on the surreal; like John Updike, Spencer is a poet-celebrant of Eros, lyrically precise in his descriptions of lovers' fantasies, lovers' lovemaking, lovers' bodies ..." The Wall Street Journal has said: "There are few novelists alive who use the English language as Scott Spencer does ... Every ache of feeling, every failed effort at restraint, every attempt at self-deception is captured in precise, beautifully cadenced prose."

Spencer was born in Washington, D.C. He has worked as a journalist and has been published in The New York Times, The New Yorker, Harper's Magazine, GQ, O, The Oprah Magazine, and he is a regular contributor to Rolling Stone.

He has taught at Columbia University, the University of Iowa, Williams College, Bard College's Bard Prison Initiative, and the University of Virginia. Spencer attended the University of Illinois, Roosevelt University, and graduated from the University of Wisconsin. In 2004, he was the recipient of a Guggenheim Fellowship. For the past twenty years, he has lived in a small town in upstate New York. He was the father of the painter Celeste Dupuy-Spencer.

For two sequenced horror novels, Spencer has used the pseudonym "Chase Novak".

== List of novels ==
- Last Night at the Brain Thieves Ball (1973)
- Preservation Hall (1976)
- Endless Love (1979)
- Waking the Dead (1986)
- Secret Anniversaries (1990)
- Men in Black (1995)
- Rich Man's Table (1998)
- A Ship Made of Paper (2003)
- Willing (2008)
- Man in the Woods (2010)
- Breed (as ″Chase Novak″) (2012)
- Brood (as ″Chase Novak″) (2014)
- River Under the Road (2017)
- An Ocean Without a Shore (2020)
