= Two Deaths =

1995 British film by Nicolas Roeg

- Directed by: Nicolas Roeg
- Written by: Allan Scott
- Based on: The Two Deaths of Señora Puccini by Stephen Dobyns
- Produced by: Carolyn Montagu; Luc Roeg
- Starring: Michael Gambon; Sônia Braga; Patrick Malahide; Nickolas Grace; Ion Caramitru
- Cinematography: Witold Stok
- Edited by: Tony Lawson
- Music by: Hans Zimmer
- Production company: BBC Films
- Distributed by: Castle Hill Productions
- Release date: 10 September 1995
- Running time: 102 minutes
- Country: United Kingdom
- Language: English

Two Deaths is a 1995 British drama film directed by Nicolas Roeg and starring Michael Gambon, Sônia Braga, and Patrick Malahide. It was written by Allan Scott based on the 1988 novel The Two Deaths of Señora Puccini by Stephen Dobyns.

The film premiered at the Toronto International Film Festival in 1995 before having a wider release in 1996.

== Plot ==
On the eve of the 1989 revolution in Romania, Dr. Daniel Pavenic sits down to dinner with some friends and discusses his past and his obsession with his housekeeper. His shocking honesty eventually leads to his guests also disclosing some of their own secrets.

== Cast ==
- Michael Gambon as Daniel Pavenic
- Sônia Braga as Ana Puscasu
- Patrick Malahide as George Bucsan
- Ion Caramitru as Carl Dalakis
- Nickolas Grace as Marius Vernescu
- John Shrapnel as Cinca
- Ravil Isyanov as Lieutenant
- Andrew Tiernan as Captain Jorgu
- Sevilla Delofski as Elena
- Matthew Terdre as Leon
- Lisa Orgolini as Young Ana

== Production ==
Dorich House in Kingston Vale, South West London, was used as the filming location for Pavenic's house.

== Critical reception ==
The Radio Times Guide to Films gave the film 3/5 stars, writing: "Director Nicolas Roeg and screenwriter Allan Scott have shifted the scene from Chile to Romania for this adaptation of Stephen Dobyns's novel. This set-bound drama could be situated anywhere, however, and it would still have the same resonance. There's no escaping the theatricality of the piece, but the story that unfolds over dinner is both compelling and disturbing. Michael Gambon effortlessly conveys pride and regret as he reveals how he has mistreated his housekeeper, Sônia Braga, whose statuesque dignity masks a burning desire for revenge. Far from Roeg's best, but still solid."

The Los Angeles Daily News wrote: "Not since Roman Polanski's Bitter Moon [1992] has a film offered such a pessimistic, mean-spirited vision of sexual relations as a brutal go-for-broke power struggle in which there are only two roles: victim and tormentor. Where Bitter Moon was shot through with a dark, Freudian humor and the sense of it all being a nasty practical joke, Two Deaths strains toward a heavy metaphorical resonance. ... In a role one can imagine George Sanders would have relished, Gambon plays Daniel with such a disarming lightness that he is charming, despite his actions. The complicated responses his performance evokes lend the film a moral complexity that prevents the central equation from seeming thuddingly glib. Two Deaths gives a new and ugly meaning to cliches exalting 'the power of love'."

The Hollywood Reporter wrote: A disturbing and fascinating glimpse into the human psyche, Two Deaths is a masterful concoction from director Nicolas Roeg. ...[who] has energized it with thematically apt dynamics. Colour-wise, it's a dank blend of muted tones, indicative of its perverse slants, and musically, it's an assemblage of astringent sounds, again dead on to its under-layers.

Variety wrote: "When director Nicolas Roeg is on his game, there are few contemporary filmmakers who can (or would want to) match his ability to reveal his characters' fears, phobias and descents into brutality and madness. ... While his gruelling new psychological drama Two Deaths does boast virtually all of the hallmarks of Roeg's peculiar canon, the pic's tough, bleak material will severely limit B.O. appeal. Roeg's ability to stitch together seemingly unconnected strands of story and minute visual details once again shines in Two Deaths. ... [his] unique sensibility and technical proficiency never have been stronger, from his intricate, baroque investigations of Pavenic's house, courtesy of cinematographer Witold Stok and production designer Don Taylor, to his hand with the actors, all of whom are chillingly effective."
