= Stephen Dobyns =

American poet and novelist (1941–2026)

- Born: Stephen J. Dobyns; February 19, 1941; Orange, New Jersey, U.S.
- Died: June 14, 2026 (aged 85); Woodbridge, Connecticut, U.S.
- Education: Shimer College; Wayne State University; Iowa Writers' Workshop (MFA)
- Occupations: Poet; novelist
- Parent(s): Lester L. Dobyns; Barbara Johnston Dobyns

Stephen J. Dobyns (February 19, 1941 – June 14, 2026) was an American poet and novelist.

== Life and career ==
Dobyns was born in Orange, New Jersey, on February 19, 1941, to Lester L., an Episcopal minister, and Barbara Johnston Dobyns, a history teacher at the high school and college levels. Dobyns was raised in New Jersey, Michigan, Virginia, and Pennsylvania. He was educated at Shimer College, transferred to and graduated from Wayne State University in 1964, and received an MFA from the Iowa Writers' Workshop at the University of Iowa in 1967. He worked as a reporter for the Detroit News.

He taught at various academic institutions, including Sarah Lawrence College, the Warren Wilson College MFA Program for Writers, the University of Iowa, Syracuse University, and Boston University.

In 1995, as a professor of English at Syracuse University, he was accused of sexual harassment after an incident in which he also threw a drink at his accuser and made a rude remark about her in front of numerous witnesses. Syracuse University suspended him for two years, after which he resigned. Francine Prose defended him—as did university professor/writers Mary Karr, Tobias Wolff, Hayden Carruth, and Agha Shahid Ali.

Dobyns died on June 14, 2026, at the age of 85.

== Works ==
Dobyns wrote 24 novels in a variety of genres, as well as 14 poetry collections and two non-fiction works about the craft of poetry.

In much of his work, Dobyns uses the ridiculous and the absurd as vehicles to introduce more profound meditations on life, love, and art. His journalistic training has strongly informed this voice.

His poetry has won numerous accolades, including a Lamont Poetry Selection (Concurring Beasts), a National Poetry Series selection (Black Dog, Red Dog), and a Melville Cane Award (Cemetery Nights).

His novel Cold Dog Soup (1985) was made into two films, the American Cold Dog Soup and the French Doggy Bag. The Two Deaths of Señora Puccini (1988) was made into the 1995 film Two Deaths. The movie Wild Turkey is based on a short story by Dobyns.

He wrote many detective stories about a private detective named Charlie Bradshaw who works out of Saratoga Springs in upstate New York. Bradshaw is unusual as a private eye protagonist, an ordinary man who was once a police officer. All the books have the word "Saratoga" in the title.

In the comic novel The Wrestler's Cruel Study (1993), the protagonist roams through a modern cityscape governed by fairy-tale rituals, searching for his missing fiancée. He is alternately aided or hindered by a Friedrich Nietzsche-quoting manager and his Hegelian nemesis, to find that his wrestling matches are choreographed by a shadowy organization that enacts their various Gnostic theological debates through the pageantry and panoply of the ring. He eventually learns to resolve his own dualistic nature and determine who he is despite the role he plays.

The Church of Dead Girls (1997) is a novel about a small town's hysterical response to the mysterious disappearance of three of its teenaged girls.

Boy in the Water (1999) is a novel about events in a secluded private school in the United States.

Jenny Hilborne wrote in New York Journal of Books that The Burn Palace (2013) "is an intriguing fictional mystery set in the town of Brewster, Rhode Island, and includes elements of the supernatural, satanism, and other alternate religions, including neo-pagans, Wicca, and witchcraft...mysterious and engaging . . .”

Is Fat Bob Dead Yet? was named one of Publishers Weekly's Best Mysteries of 2015.

== Bibliography ==
=== Poetry ===
- Concurring Beasts (1972)
- Griffon: Poems (1976)
- Heat Death (1980)
- The Balthus Poems (1982)
- Black Dog, Red Dog (1984). ISBN 0-03-071077-4
- Cemetery Nights (1987). ISBN 0-14-058584-2
- Body Traffic (1990)
- Velocities: New and Selected Poems, 1966-1992 (1994). ISBN 0-14-058651-2
- Common Carnage (1996)
- Pallbearers Envying the One Who Rides (1999). ISBN 0-14-058916-3
- The Porcupine's Kisses (2002)
- Mystery, So Long (2005)
- Winter's Journey (Copper Canyon Press, 2010)
- The Day's Last Light Reddens the Leaves of the Copper Beech (BOA Editions, 2016)

=== Fiction ===
- A Man of Little Evils (1973) ISBN 0-689-10567-3
- Dancer With One Leg (1983)
- Cold Dog Soup (1985)
- A Boat Off the Coast (1987)
- The Two Deaths of Senora Puccini (1988). ISBN 0-14-023579-5
- The House on Alexandrine (1990). ISBN 0-8143-2183-6
- After Shocks/Near Escapes (1991)
- The Wrestler's Cruel Study (1993). ISBN 0-393-03511-5
- The Church of Dead Girls (1997). ISBN 0-8050-5103-1
- Boy in the Water (1999). ISBN 0-312-97522-8
- Eating Naked [SS] (2000). ISBN 0-312-27829-2
- The Burn Palace (2013). ISBN 0-399-16087-6
- Is Fat Bob Dead Yet? (2015). ISBN 978-0-399-17145-1

==== Charlie Bradshaw series ====
- Saratoga Longshot (1976). ISBN 0-14-025196-0
- Saratoga Swimmer (1981). ISBN 0-14-006357-9
- Saratoga Headhunter (1985). ISBN 0-14-015606-2
- Saratoga Snapper (1986). ISBN 0-670-81059-2
- Saratoga Bestiary (1988). ISBN 0-670-82024-5
- Saratoga Hexameter (1990)
- Saratoga Haunting (1993)
- Saratoga Backtalk (1994). ISBN 0-393-03659-6
- Saratoga Fleshpot (1995). ISBN 0-393-03805-X
- Saratoga Strongbox (1998). ISBN 0-670-87692-5
- Saratoga Payback (2017). ISBN 0399576576

=== Nonfiction ===
- Best Words, Best Order: Essays on Poetry (1996)
- Next Word, Better Word: The Craft of Writing Poetry (2011)
