= Mandela's Gun =

- Theatrical release poster
- Directed by: John Irvin
- Written by: Athos Kyriakides; Malcolm Purkey
- Produced by: Claire Evans; Jeremy Nathan; Moroba Nkawe
- Starring: Tumisho Masha
- Cinematography: Lance Gewer
- Edited by: Humphrey Dixon; Henion Han
- Music by: Abdullah Ibrahim
- Production companies: Dearheart Productions; Dv8 Films
- Release date: October 28, 2016 (Johannesburg Film Festival)
- Country: South Africa
- Language: English

Mandela's Gun is a 2016 South African biographical film of Nelson Mandela's experience as a guerrilla fighter for the African National Congress. It was directed by John Irvin and shot in South Africa.

Nelson Mandela is portrayed by newcomer Tumisho Masha, who soon after the film's release was arrested on charges of "intent to cause grievous bodily harm" and "malicious damage to property."
