= Agadah =

- Directed by: Alberto Rondalli
- Starring: Nahuel Pérez Biscayart; Jordi Mollà; Caterina Murino; Valentina Cervi; Pilar López de Ayala; Alessio Boni
- Release date: 16 November 2017
- Running time: 2h 6min
- Country: Italy
- Language: Italian

Agadah is a 2017 Italian adventure film based on the novel The Manuscript Found in Saragossa by Jan Potocki.

== Cast ==
- Nahuel Pérez Biscayart - Alfonso di van Worden
- Jordi Mollà - Jan Potocki / Diego Hervas
- Giulia Bertinelli - Zibbedè
- Marta Manduca - Emina
- Caterina Murino - principessa
- Marco Foschi - Blas Hervas
- Ivan Franek - Thibaud
- Valentina Cervi - Ines
- Alessandro Haber - Cornandez
- Flavio Bucci - vecchio Moreno
- Umberto Orsini - Belial
- Pilar López de Ayala - Rebecca
- Alessio Boni - Pietro di Oria
