= Míster Danger =

Míster Peligro, or Señor Peligro (English: Mister Danger), is the name of a character in the novel Doña Bárbara, written by Venezuelan novelist and former president Rómulo Gallegos. Both Spanish and English forms of the name appear in the novel.

In the novel, Míster Danger, or "Guillermo Danger", is an American from Alaska of Danish and Irish heritage who resides mostly in Venezuela (Gallegos capitalizes the moniker Míster Peligro, though the same treatment is not accorded to the alternate form of the name). Míster Danger allies himself with the much-feared and eponymous Doña Bárbara, a malevolent and powerful figure from whom the novel's title is derived. Doña Bárbara's infamy stems from her reputation for amassing property in the Llanos through litigation, as well as for her alleged practice of black magic. She and Míster Peligro manage to swindle lands out of unknowing llaneros' hands and their efforts represent the principal source of opposition to the novel's protagonist's mission to bring law and order to the llanos. The novel's protagonist, Santos Luzardo, is a llanos-born lawyer from Caracas who returns to his native land on a short trip to assess his family's landholdings. He ultimately takes it upon himself to rid the region of the pervasive influence of Míster Peligro and Doña Bárbara.

== In popular culture ==
Former Venezuelan president Hugo Chávez often used the epithet "Mr Danger" to refer to then United States President George W. Bush.

The band Ministry has a song on their album Rio Grande Blood titled "Señor Peligro" that refers to Chávez's references to Mr. Danger.
