= Almost a Woman =

2001 television film directed by Betty Kaplan

- Written by: Esmeralda Santiago
- Directed by: Betty Kaplan
- Starring: Ana Maria Lagasca; Wanda De Jesus; Míriam Colón; Cliff DeYoung; Francesco Quinn
- Music by: Lee Holdridge
- Country of origin: United States
- Original languages: English; Spanish

Production
- Producers: Ronald Colby; Rebecca Eaton
- Cinematography: Carlos González
- Editor: Luis Colina
- Production companies: ALT Films, in association with Paramount Pictures for WGBH

Original release
- Network: PBS
- Release: 2001

Almost a Woman is a 2001 made-for-television film, directed by Betty Kaplan and based on the autobiographical book of the same name by Puerto Rican writer Esmeralda Santiago. The film is about a young woman named Esmeralda and her family who move to New York from a rural area of Puerto Rico. The transition is difficult due to the many challenges she and her family face. It was aired on PBS as part of Masterpiece Theatre's American Collection.

== Plot ==
The movie start out in Puerto Rico, where the young woman named Esmeralda "Negi" Santiago is living with her family. Her mom decides to bring her and her brother, along with other siblings to America, without her father, because her brother's foot injury. In America, Esmeralda has trouble fitting in because of cultural and language difficulties. However, she finds support in her teachers, and one of her classmates, who later becomes her best friend. She overcomes obstacles and is able to graduate from the high school.
