= The Fourth Angel =

2001 film by John Irvin

- UK DVD Cover by Universal Studios Home Video
- Directed by: John Irvin
- Screenplay by: Allan Scott
- Based on: The Fourth Angel by Robin Neillands
- Produced by: Allan Scott; Peter R. Simpson
- Starring: Jeremy Irons; Jason Priestley; Forest Whitaker; Charlotte Rampling; Lois Maxwell
- Cinematography: Mike Molloy
- Edited by: Nick Rotundo
- Music by: Paul Zaza
- Production companies: New Legend Media; Norstar Entertainment; Rafford Films; Sky Pictures
- Distributed by: Global Cinema Group
- Release dates: 15 August 2001 (France); 18 January 2002 (Canada)
- Running time: 96 minutes
- Countries: United Kingdom; Canada
- Languages: English; French; Serbo-Croatian

The Fourth Angel is a 2001 British-Canadian thriller film directed by John Irvin and starring Jeremy Irons, Forest Whitaker, Jason Priestley and Charlotte Rampling. It was written by Allan Scott, from a homonymous novel by Robin Neillands (writing under the name Robin Hunter). Irons portrays a man who seeks justice after a terrorist attack on the plane in which his family was travelling. The film takes its title from Revelation 16:8: "The fourth angel poured out his bowl upon the sun, and it was given to him to scorch men with fire".

== Plot ==
Jack Elgin (Jeremy Irons) is the European editor of The Economist, a magazine based in London, England. Jack has a wife, Maria (Briony Glassco), and three kids, Joanne (Anna Maguire), Julia (Holly Boyd), and Andrew (Joel Pitts). Jack subtly changes the family vacation from a lazy week of Mediterranean fun and sun in Corfu to a tour of India, hoping to simultaneously seize a plum reporting assignment, and spend quality time with his family. Maria is not as impressed as the kids are.

On the way to India, their plane, a Boeing 747-200 owned by AM Air, an American airline, makes an unscheduled stopover in Limassol, Cyprus, because of a mechanical problem. After a while of waiting inside the Limassol airport, everyone gets back on the plane, which is then hijacked by a group of terrorists known as the August 15th Movement, led by a Serbian named Ivanic Loyvek (Serge Soric) and his right-hand man Karadan Maldic (Ivan Marevich), who demand $50,000,000 from the U.S. State Department in one hour or everyone on the airplane will die.

The demand is met, and Loyvek and Maldic start releasing the women and children, with the men to go last, but as soon as a front passenger door is opened, a local police team gunning for the terrorists opens fire. The flight attendants frantically open the rest of the airplane's doors and start getting passengers out, but the terrorists start killing passengers, leading to an explosion.

Maria, Joanne, and Julia get out of the airplane, and then Jack, holding Andrew, gets out, only to watch Maria, Joanne, and Julia get shot by the terrorists. Maria and Joanne are dead, and Julia is still alive, but Julia burns to death while crying for help. In all, a total of 15 passengers die, and Loyvek and Maldic, the surviving terrorists, escape, knowing that they now have the $50,000,000. Jack feels that the hijacking would never have ended that way if the police team had waited until after the passengers were released from the airplane before opening fire.

Back in London, a devastated Jack is told that the terrorists were captured, but they were released and deported secretly, with no charges & no arrest. Jack is enraged that Loyvek and Maldic got off scot free. While helping Andrew cope, Jack tries all the legal ways to ensure justice for his family, but to no avail.

Jack pays a visit to Henry Davidson (Jason Priestley), a CIA agent who works at the American Embassy in London. Davidson tells Jack that there's little that can be done. Jack decides he must do something about it himself.

With the help of his friend, ex-intelligence operative Kate Stockton (Charlotte Rampling), Jack tracks down those who work with Loyvek and Maldic, and turns their own weapons against them. Trailing Jack is FBI agent Jules Bernard (Forest Whitaker), who's cooperating with Scotland Yard on anti-terrorist activities, and who suspects that Jack is the man who has been killing anyone involved in the hijacking.

It turns out Jules is on Jack's side, and he's willing to help Jack. After Jack kills Maldic, it turns out that Davidson was behind everything. Davidson had the airplane hijacked so he could get $50,000,000. With Jules's help, Jack sets out to make Loyvek and Davidson pay for the deaths of his family and the other people who died in Cyprus.

== Cast ==
- Jeremy Irons as Jack Elgin
- Forest Whitaker as FBI Agent Jules Bernard
- Jason Priestley as CIA Agent Henry Davidson
- Briony Glassco as Maria Elgin
- Charlotte Rampling as Kate Stockton
- Lois Maxwell as Olivia
- Timothy West as Jones
- Joel Pitts as Andrew Elgin
- Anna Maguire as Joanne Elgin
- Holly Boyd as Julia Elgin
- Kal Weber as Kulindos
- Ian McNeice as MI5 Agent Lewison
- Serge Soric as Ivanic Loyvek
- Ivan Marevich as Karadan Maldic

== Release ==
Produced in 2001, The Fourth Angel opened in a number of European countries before the events of 9/11. The commercial failure of other terrorist-themed films such as Collateral Damage led to the delay of its wider release, including in the US and UK. It was finally issued direct to DVD in the US in 2003 by Artisan Entertainment.
