= Sonia Chocrón =

Venezuelan poet and novelist

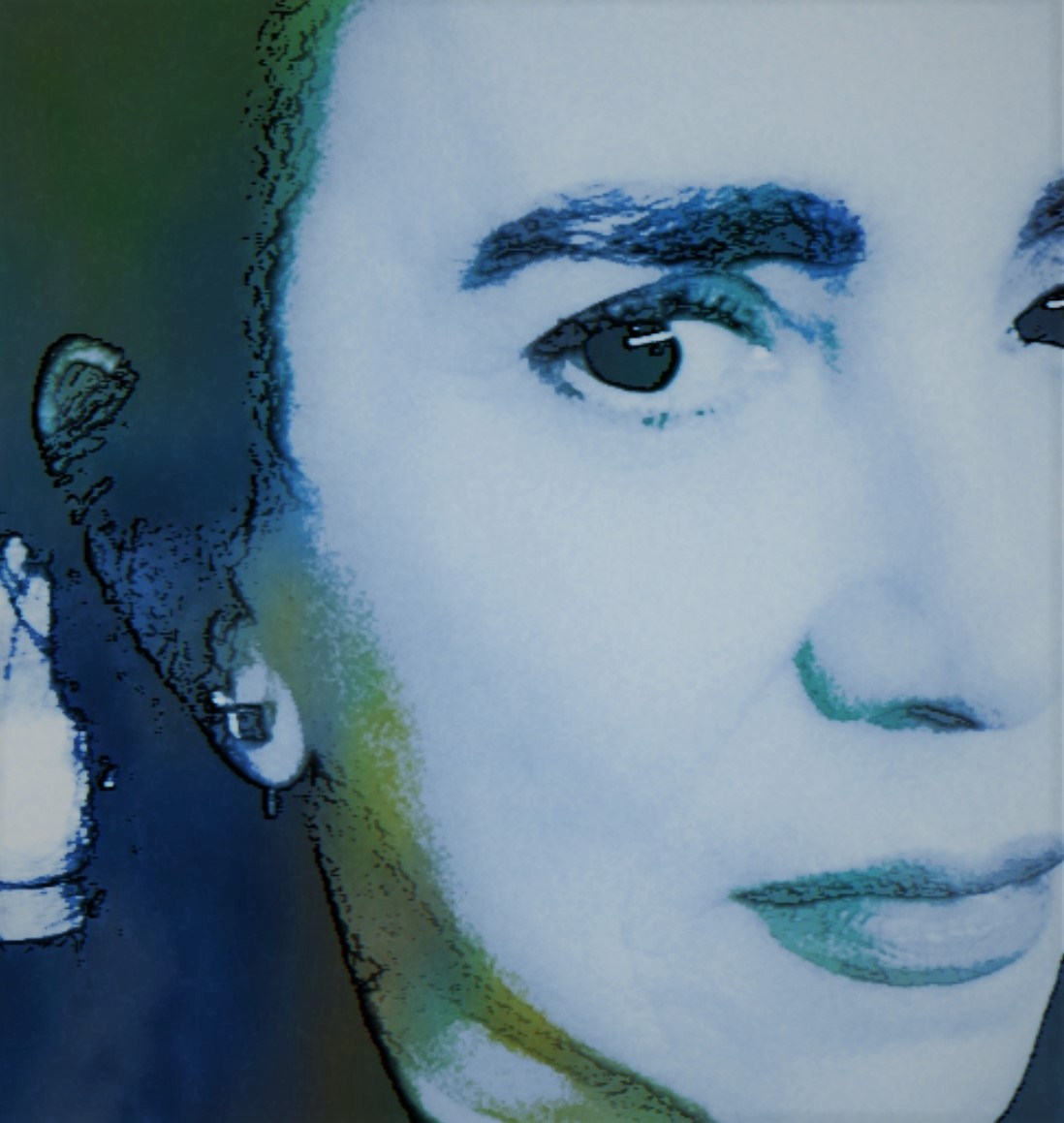
- Photo of Sonia Chocrón
- Born: Sonia Chocrón; March 17, 1961 (age 65); Caracas, Venezuela
- Education: Universidad Católica Andrés Bello
- Occupations: Poet, writer, screenwriter, playwright
- Years active: 1992–
- Children: Ximena Abadi
- Relatives: Isaac Chocrón

Sonia Chocrón (born 17 March 1961 in Caracas) is a Venezuelan poet, novelist, screenwriter and playwright of Sephardic origin. She is related to the Venezuelan dramatist Isaac Chocrón.

Born in a Moroccan Jewish family, she completed her Social Communication degree at the Andrés Bello Catholic University. In 1982 she entered the Workshop of Poetry of the Rómulo Gallegos Center for Latin American Studies. In 1988 she was selected to participate in the Workshop "The Argument of Fiction" taught by Gabriel García Márquez at the School of Cinema located in San Antonio de los Baños, Cuba. After that, she traveled to Mexico invited by the Nobel Prize Academy to find the Gabriel García Márquez Cinematographic Bureau. Her literary work, as well as her scripts for cinema and television, have awarded her prizes and accolades at a local and international level.

== Published works ==
Her literary works have been published in diverse essays and anthologies in Europe, Latin America, and United States, among others.

- Carnet de Identidad (2023). LP5 Editora, Chile. Poetry
- Hermana pequeña. (2020). Editorial Ecelpsidra. Poetry
- Bruxa/Toledana. (2019). Editorial Kalathos, España.Poetry
- Muela/Molar. (2015). Tale. (in English)
- Mary Poppins y otros poemas (2015) Lugar Común Editores. Poetry
- La Dama Oscura (2014) Ediciones B./ Sudaquia Editores, N.Y. Novel
- Sábanas Negras (2013). Ediciones B. Novel
- Las Mujeres de Houdini (2012). Bruguera. Novel
- Poesía Re-Unida (2010). Bid and Co Editores. Poetry
- La virgen del baño turco y otros cuentos falaces (2008). Ediciones B. Tale
- Falsas apariencias (2004). Editorial Alfaguara.Tale
- La buena hora (2002). Monteávila Editores. Poetry
- Púrpura (1998). Editorial la Liebre Libre. Poetry
- Toledana (1992). Monteávila Editores Poetry
- Hermana pequeña (2020). Editorial Eclepsidra
- Carnet de identidad (2023). LP5 Editora, Chile. Poetry.

=== Scripts for cinema and TV ===
- Original script for the feature film "Oro Diablo". 2000.
- Co-Writer for the documentary film "The Lost Key". 2014.

=== Scripts for Theatre ===
- Ni un Pelo de Tontas. 2015
- La Reina y yo. 2015

== Prizes received ==
- First finalist, Fundarte Prize of Poetry, 1991.
- First finalist, José Antonio Pérez Bonalde International Prize of Poetry, 1996.
- Mention of Honour for the collection of poems La Buena Hora, Literary Biennial José Rafael Pocaterra, 1996.
- Winner, Annual Tales Contest of the newspaper El Nacional for the tale La Señora Hyde, 2000.
