= Doña Bárbara =

1929 novel by Rómulo Gallegos

Doña Barbara
- Cover of the first edition of Doña Bárbara
- Author: Rómulo Gallegos
- Original title: Doña Barbara
- Language: Spanish
- Genre: Novel
- Publisher: Editorial Araluce
- Publication date: February 1929 (Eng. trans. 1931)
- Publication place: Spain (publication); Venezuela (subject and author)
- Media type: Print (Hardback & Paperback)
- Pages: 395

Doña Bárbara (Lady Bárbara) is a novel by Venezuelan author Rómulo Gallegos, first published in 1929. It was described in 1974 as "possibly the most widely known Latin American novel".

This regionalist novel deals with the confrontation between civilization and the barbaric aspects of the rural environment and its inhabitants. It is written in the third person and mixes vernacular language and regionalisms with literary narrative, making the main conflict more obvious and at the same time more tangible. This novel is considered a masterpiece of Venezuelan literature and a classic in Latin American literature. It establishes a psychological study of the people of the Venezuelan plains: victims of unfortunate situations, but at the same time strong and courageous.

== Publication ==
Gallegos took his first trip into the Llanos of Apure, central Venezuela at Easter 1927, in order to gather material for the book he was writing, during the course of which he stayed on a ranch near San Fernando de Apure. His previous book, La Trepadora, had been well received. During his stay, he gathered many details of the local idiom, scenery, and daily life, and was inspired by the real people he encountered; Doña Bárbara herself is derived at least in part from the local landowner Doña Pancha. Of the fifty place names mentioned, more than half are easily identifiable in the area, and many more can be associated with existing sites with a little more effort.

Within a month of returning to Caracas, the first pages of the resulting novel, La Coronela, were being printed. However, dissatisfied with the title and the first printed pages, Gallegos called the printing off. Gallegos then took his wife to Bologna, Italy, for an operation, and returned to the manuscript, making substantial revisions and coming up with a better title: Doña Bárbara. The novel was then first published in Barcelona, Spain, in February 1929, by Spanish publisher Editorial Araluce. It was substantially revised for its January 1930 second edition, with Gallegos adding five chapters amounting to 20,000 words, re-ordering chapters, and making various other changes. Gallegos later made further changes, until the author was finally satisfied with his work in 1954.

== Reception ==
The novel was published to worldwide acclaim, and despite Gallegos' research in the Llanos taking just 8 days, those familiar with the Venezuelan Llanos were, almost without exception, convinced of its authenticity and that Gallegos was extremely familiar with the region, if not born there.

== Historical context ==
In the 1920s, Venezuela was under the dictatorial regime of Juan Vicente Gómez. His rule saw wealth from oil discovered in the early twentieth century, and he used it to develop modern infrastructure and end the era of caudillismo, fully and completely uniting the country for the first time. However his rule was also brutal and corrupt.

== Plot summary ==
Santos Luzardo, a graduate lawyer of the Central University of Venezuela, returns to his father's land in the plains of Apure to sell the land but desists when he discovers that it is controlled by a despotic woman, Doña Bárbara, also known as the men's devourer; it is said that she uses seduction and pacts with demonic spirits to satisfy her whims and achieve power.

Santos Luzardo meets his cousin Lorenzo Barquero and discovers that he was a victim of the femme fatale, who left him bankrupt and a daughter, Marisela, whom she abandoned and who became quickly a vagrant. Lorenzo lives in poverty in a miserable house consumed by his own constant drunkenness.

Doña Bárbara falls in love with Santos Luzardo and, through an internal struggle, comes to abandon her evil ways. Luzardo, however, is charmed by Marisela, no longer living in abandonment and taken under Luzardo's care.

The novel ends with the "defeat" of Doña Bárbara, who is able to obtain neither the land nor Luzardo's heart, and finally departs to an unknown location.

== Characters ==
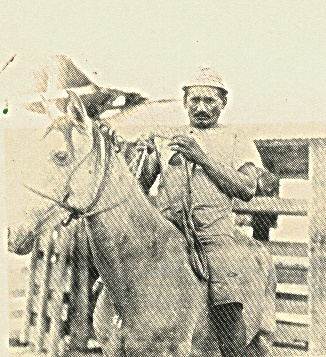
Gallegos based the character of Maria Nieves on a real man of the same name he knew during his travels in the plains. Maria Nieves photographed here in 1920 ready to direct the cattle across a river.

- Santos Luzardo: represents civilization and progress. He is an advanced plainsman and, at the same time, a graduate lawyer of the Central University of Venezuela. Luzardo is a man of great psychological depth and essentially good.
- Doña Bárbara Guaimarán: representing barbarism, is Luzardo's antithesis; she is arbitrary, violent, manipulative, cunning and whimsical. However, in her there is not an absolute absence of feelings, which are intensely awakened by Santos Luzardo. Her contradictory manners reflect the wild behavior of her environment. Her behaviour is a reaction to the trauma she suffered in her childhood, victim of high levels of abuse.
- Marisela: represents good raw material that civilization can mold. Born from a loveless union she is rescued from a degraded condition by Luzardo
- Lorenzo Barquero: Orphan whose future was destroyed by misfortune and vice.
- Míster Danger: represents the contempt foreigners harbor toward Venezuelans. He is Doña Bárbara's accomplice.
- Juan Primito: represents superstition and the pagan beliefs of the plainsmen.

== Adaptations ==
- Doña Barbara (1943 film)
- Doña Barbara (1967 TV series)
- Doña Bárbara, 1967 opera by Caroline Lloyd with a libretto by Isaac Chocrón and orchestrations by Hershy Kay
- Doña Barbara (1975 TV series)
- Doña Barbara (1998 film)
- Doña Barbara (2008 TV series)
- La Doña (2016 TV series)

== Bibliography ==
- Englekirk, John E., "Doña Bárbara, Legend of the Llano", Hispania, 31(3), August 1948, pp259–270
- Shaw, Donald, "Gallegos' Revision of Doña Bárbara 1929-30, Hispanic Review 42(3), Summer 1974, pp265–278
