= Of Love and Shadows =

- Theatrical release poster
- Directed by: Betty Kaplan
- Screenplay by: Donald Freed
- Based on: Of Love and Shadows by Isabel Allende
- Produced by: Richard Goodwin; Betty Kaplan; Paul Mayersohn
- Starring: Antonio Banderas; Jennifer Connelly; Stefania Sandrelli; Camilo Gallardo; Diego Wallraff; Patricio Contreras
- Cinematography: Félix Monti
- Edited by: Bill Butler; Kathryn Himoff
- Music by: José Nieto
- Production companies: Aleph Producciones; Argentina Española; Miramax Films; Pandora Cinema
- Distributed by: Miramax Films
- Release dates: October 7, 1994 (Germany); May 10, 1996 (USA)
- Language: English
- Box office: $19,710

Of Love and Shadows, also known as De amor y de sombra, is a 1994 Chilean-Argentine-American drama film written and directed by Betty Kaplan and starring Antonio Banderas, Jennifer Connelly, Stefania Sandrelli and Patricio Contreras. It is based on the 1984 novel of the same name by Isabel Allende.

== Plot ==
Irene is a magazine editor living under the shadow of the Pinochet dictatorship in Chile. Francisco is a handsome photographer and he comes to Irene for a job. As a sympathizer with the underground resistance movement, Francisco opens her eyes and her heart to the atrocities being committed by the state.

== Cast ==
- Antonio Banderas as Francisco Leal
- Jennifer Connelly as Irene Beltrán
- Stefania Sandrelli as Beatriz Mart
- Diego Wallraff as José William
- Camilo Gallardo as Gustavo Martiny
- Patricio Contreras as Mario Rosemund
- Jorge Rivera López as Prof. Leal
- Jacques Arndt as The General

== Reception ==
The film had almost 300,000 admissions in Argentina during 1995.

On the review aggregator website Rotten Tomatoes, 20% of 5 critics' reviews are positive, with an average rating of 4.3/10.
