= Art of Love (2022 film) =

- U.S release poster
- Directed by: Betty Kaplan
- Written by: Betty Kaplan; Eduardo Lalo
- Based on: Simone by Eduardo Lalo
- Produced by: Frances Lausell; Peter Rawley
- Starring: Esai Morales; Kunjue Li
- Cinematography: Sonnel Velazquez
- Edited by: Luis Colina
- Music by: Geronimo Mercado
- Distributed by: Samuel Goldwyn Films
- Release date: July 22, 2022 (United States)
- Running time: 116 minutes
- Country: Puerto Rico
- Languages: English; Spanish

Art of Love (formerly titled Simone) is a 2022 Puerto Rican romantic thriller film directed by Betty Kaplan and starring Esai Morales and Kunjue Li. It is based on the 2013 novel Simone by Eduardo Lalo, who co-wrote the screenplay with Kaplan.

== Plot summary ==
With thoughts voiced by a narrator, the protagonist, a university professor gives a passionate lecture to students. An Asian-looking student watches intently. The professor receives a note delivered by a young woman on a skateboard. Then, he is at a mall. Julia looks at engagement rings at a shopping mall. The professor drives Julia and her son, Javier, afterwards. He tells Julia about a note that was delivered to him by a person on a skateboard and she gets annoyed, and they argue. They arrive at home and he carries the boy to bed. Julia undresses and seduces him after saying "too bad (her son) isn't yours."

The professor sees a message written on the pavement that says something to the effect of 'the greatest form of love is paying attention to another human.' As the messages in the form of notes continue, the professor attempts to learn the identity of the sender. He speaks to a French bookshop owner at her shop, and learns the person courting him is possibly Simone Weil. At a Chinese restaurant, where she works as a waitress, the professor eats and has a book titled "Simone Weil" (which is the name of the person who has been courting him). Finally, a message on his landline from Simone, introducing herself brings him joyous expectation for the date she sets for them to meet. They meet at the restaurant and she asks him to take her to his home. He carries her to his bedroom and begins undressing her lovingly, slowly. He nuzzles her breast and belly. She unbuckles his belt and he lays on top of her as they have sex but only partially. Simone tells him she was a lesbian.

He talks on the telephone, and angrily reacts to a rejection from a publisher, while his all-female staff cheer him on.

The narrator says Simone and the professor are in love. Simone and the professor photograph the place of her employment and plaster posters on its outside walls to promote her work. The professor is happy. Simone introduces the professor to her great uncle and her cousin. The cousin speaks angrily in Chinese and leaves the room, but Simone does not translate. But later Simone rejects him when he asks if she is every going to let him make love to her completely she says she can not explain, then leaves him a message saying she can not see him for a while.

One rainy night, the professor finds Simone sitting on the sidewalk, brings her to his house and shampoos her hair in the shower. On the couch, Julia opens her legs suggestively. They are at last able to make love completely for the first time. The next morning, he catches her as she is sneaking out, in tears. She tells the professor her cousin raped her many times when she was 13 to 16 years old, that she got pregnant and had an abortion with Chinese herbs after she suffered. He embraces Li.

He finds she had a fight at work and was fired. He visits her great uncle and shares his love for her. He speaks to her friend Glenda, her co-worker at the restaurant.

The professor meets her ex-lover, a woman writer, and discovers that Li is leaving with her very soon for California. He tries to get her to stay with him. He writes his feelings of woe about his situation. Li shows at his house desperately yelling "writer, writer, writer" and he refuses to open the door. Li pens him a note and leaves. He reads it: “I’ve learned to live with minimal means. My lesbianism is an irony. I’ve never known the feeling of respect, of being on the same level as another human being as I did with you. I don’t know what it means to be free to escape. I must go far away. This is my attempt to say: ‘I’m sorry.’”

== Cast ==
- Esai Morales as Professor/Writer
- Kunjue Li as Li Chao
- Caterina Murino as Carmen Lindo
- Jim Lau as Wen Da/Old Bald Chinese
- Bruno Irizarry as Máximo Noreña
- Braulio Castillo Jr. as Dean Pedro Benitez
- Zorie Fonalledas as Julia
- Elí Cay as Garcia Pardo
- Melanie Ramos as Lina/Skate Board Girl
- Aris Mejias as Glenda

== Production ==
Between March and June 2020, filming was halted due to the COVID-19 pandemic.

== Release ==
In June 2022, it was announced that Samuel Goldwyn Films acquired U.S. distribution rights to the film, which was released in theaters and on digital platforms on July 22, 2022.

== Reception ==
Concepción de León of The New York Times gave the film a negative review and wrote, "And the film reinforces the fiction that it is often younger women who seduce older men and not the other way around. The writing, which leaves much to be desired, underscores these issues."
