= Doña Bárbara (1943 film) =

1943 film

- Mexico theatrical release poster
- Directed by: Fernando de Fuentes; Miguel M. Delgado
- Written by: Fernando de Fuentes; Rómulo Gallegos
- Produced by: Fernando de Fuentes; Jesús Grovas
- Starring: María Félix; Julián Soler; María Elena Marqués
- Edited by: Charles L. Kimball
- Music by: Francisco Domínguez; Prudencio Esaá
- Distributed by: Clasa Films Mundiales
- Release date: September 16, 1943
- Running time: 138 minutes
- Country: Mexico
- Language: Spanish
- Budget: $75,000

Doña Bárbara is a 1943 Mexican romantic drama film directed and co-written by Fernando de Fuentes and starring María Félix and Julián Soler. The film is based on the 1929 novel Doña Bárbara by Venezuelan author Rómulo Gallegos, who also co-wrote the screenplay.

== Plot ==
Doña Bárbara is a wealthy landowner, hardened by a traumatic experience she suffered as an adolescent when she was raped by a group of bloodthirsty pirates who also took the life of both her father and her first love, Asdrúbal. She has amassed vast tracts of land and extensive herds of cattle by using men for her own personal gain, as well as through illegal means, such as bribing local officials. One of the few remaining landowners in the area is Santos Luzardo, who has returned from abroad to reassert control over his family's ranch. He suspects that the ranch foreman, Balbino Paiba, has been secretly working for Doña Bárbara in order to steal his cattle. The other ranch hands do not believe that Santos is the man to put a stop to Doña Bárbara's misdeeds; however, through his exceptional horsemanship, he demonstrates that the regional balance of power is about to shift.

Doña Bárbara has a teenage daughter, Marisela, born of her relationship with Lorenzo Barquero, a fellow landowner with whom she was once involved and whom she left financially ruined and completely consumed by alcoholism. With an alcoholic father and a mother who wants nothing to do with her, the young Marisela has been left in a state of total neglect, though Juan Primito—one of Doña Bárbara's servants—secretly looks after her. When Santos Luzardo meets Marisela, he decides to take both her and her father under his care; he succeeds in bringing them to his ranch, driven primarily by a desire to provide Marisela with schooling and an education, as well as to help Lorenzo Barquero overcome his alcoholism. Meanwhile, Doña Bárbara finds herself attracted to Santos; however, upon discovering that her own daughter has become a rival for his affections, she seeks by every means possible to ruin them both.

== Cast ==
- María Félix as Doña Bárbara
- Julián Soler as Santos Luzardo
- María Elena Marqués as Marisela Barquero
- Andrés Soler as Lorenzo Barquero
- Charles Rooner as Don Guillermo
- Agustín Isunza as Juan Primito
- Miguel Inclán as Melquiades
- Eduardo Arozamena as Melesio Sandoval
- Antonio R. Frausto as Antonio Sandoval
- Pedro Galindo as Nieves
- Paco Astol as Mujiquita
- Arturo Soto Rangel as Coronel Pernalete
- Manuel Dondé as Carmelito López
- Felipe Montoya as Balbino Paiba
- Luis Jiménez Morán as Pajarote
- Alfonso Bedoya as Peasant

== Other versions ==
Doña Bárbara has also been adapted into a 1975 Venezuelan telenovela, Doña Bárbara, as well as a 1998 Argentine film directed by Betty Kaplan.
