= The Moon and the Stars =

- Home video cover art
- Directed by: John Irvin
- Written by: Peter Barnes; Fabio Carpi
- Produced by: Roberto Bessi
- Starring: Alfred Molina; Jonathan Pryce; Catherine McCormack; Rupert Friend
- Cinematography: Elemér Ragályi
- Edited by: Toby Yates
- Music by: Adriano Maria Vitali
- Production companies: Buskin Film; Creative Partners Ltd. Box Film; Trees Pictures
- Distributed by: Vivendi Entertainment; Lightyear Entertainment
- Release date: 10 May 2007
- Countries: Hungary; Italy; United Kingdom
- Language: English

The Moon and the Stars is a 2007 romantic drama film starring Jonathan Pryce, Alfred Molina, Catherine McCormack and directed by John Irvin.

== Plot ==
A wealthy Jewish homosexual film producer (Molina) is making a film based on Puccini's opera Tosca and a famous German diva (McCormack) is cast opposite a difficult English actor (Pryce). As filming gets under way on a sound stage in Rome, World War II in 1939 escalates around them threatening the film's completion.

== Awards ==
- Winner - Best Film Editing (Toby Yates), Milan International Film Festival
- Winner - Best Production Design (Amedeo Fago), Milan International Film Festival

== See also ==
- Tosca (Italian film, released 1941)
