= José Ramón Medina =

Venezuelan politician, lawyer and writer

6th Attorney General of Venezuela
- In office 1974–1979

14th Comptroller General of Venezuela
- In office 1986–1994

Personal details
- Born: 20 July 1919 San Francisco de Macaira, Guárico
- Died: 14 June 2010 (aged 90) Caracas, Venezuela
- Profession: lawyer, poet, writer, politician
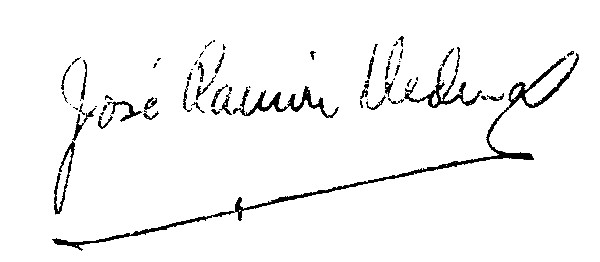
- Signature

José Ramón Medina Elorga (San Francisco de Macaira, Guárico, 20 July 1919 - Caracas, 14 June 2010), was a Venezuelan lawyer, writer, poet and politician.

== Poetry work ==
- Edad de la esperanza (1947)
- Rumor sobre diciembre (1949)
- Vísperas de la aldea (1949)
- Elegía (1950)
- A la sombra de los días (1950)
- Parva luz de la estancia familiar (1952)
- Texto sobre el tiempo (1952)
- Los días sedientos y diez elegías (1953)
- La voz profunda (1954)
- Como la vida (1954–1958)
- Antología poética (1957)
- Viento en la tarde (1959)
- Memorias y elegías (1960)
- Poesías (1961)
- Poesía plural (1969)
- Sobre la tierra yerma (1971)
- Ser verdadero (1982)
- Certezas y presagios (1984)

== See also ==
- Celarg
- Venezuelan literature
- List of Venezuelan writers
