= Waking the Dead (novel) =

Novel by Scott Spencer

- First edition
- Author: Scott Spencer
- Language: English
- Genre: Political romance novel
- Publisher: Alfred A. Knopf
- Publication date: April 12, 1986
- Publication place: United States of America
- Media type: Print (Hardcover & Paperback)
- Pages: 385 pages
- ISBN: 0-394-54356-4
- OCLC: 13003089
- Dewey Decimal: 813/.54 19
- LC Class: PS3569.P455 W3 1986

Waking the Dead is a 1986 novel by Scott Spencer. The book, Spencer's fourth, was adapted in 2000 into a film of the same name, starring Billy Crudup and Jennifer Connelly.

== Plot introduction ==
The book is a love story about two passionate liberals with vastly different approaches to their ideologies: Fielding Pierce is a lawyer and aspiring politician, and Sarah Williams is a social activist who despises the political system. During a mission to assist Chilean refugees, Williams is killed by a terrorist car-bomb. Years later, Pierce is offered the Democratic candidacy for an Illinois congressional seat, but during the campaign Pierce becomes convinced he has seen and heard Williams on several occasions. As Pierce becomes obsessed with finding out if his lost lover is alive, he is pushed to the brink of insanity and begins to fear he has become fully absorbed and changed by the political system Williams so hated.

== Reception ==
Waking the Dead was eagerly anticipated following Spencer's previous novel, the 1979 novel Endless Love. Michiko Kakutani, book reviewer for The New York Times compared Waking the Dead to the 1976 Brian De Palma film Obsession. Both feature male protagonists who lose their lover to a violent death, then later believe they have been brought back to life.

Although Kakutani said Spencer succeeded in fleshing out Pierce's world (including his upbringing and family life), in her view the author was less successful in convincing the readers of Pierce's love for Williams. Kakutani said, "his orchestration of Fielding's continuing obsession with Sarah becomes an increasingly empty display of narrative pyrotechnics". Kakutani also said the first-person narration Spencer mastered in Endless Love, was less successful in Waking the Dead and occasionally "tend[s] to come across as simple-minded or phony digressions". Paul Gray, of Time Magazine, said the Pierce character was too unlikeable, citing his "overweening self-pity (and) penchant for purple prose."

== Film adaptation ==
Film director Keith Gordon, who adapted Waking the Dead into a film, first read the book in 1991 and knew he wanted to make it into a movie before he finished it. Gordon said he was especially touched by a scene in which Pierce is on a plane taking Williams' body home and silently wishing the plane would crash: "I started to cry and I thought, I want to tell this story. I'll never forget the chill that ran through me. Then I finished the book and I was sure I had to tell it. I saw it. I saw what it looked like, I saw what it sounded like, I suddenly pictured what the cinematography would be like." Gordon said he particularly identified with Fielding Pierce, and saw parallels between in Pierce's feelings for Williams and Gordon's own love for his wife: "I can imagine if I ever lost Rachel that I would be devastated and go mad and have to work my way back to appreciating what I had gotten from her instead of dwelling on the loss." Gordon remained so faithful to the book during his adaptation that the first cut of the movie was three hours long; he shortened it to 105 minutes by trimming subplots, stories and unnecessary scenes.
