= Doña Bárbara (1998 film) =

1998 film

- Film poster
- Directed by: Betty Kaplan
- Written by: Betty Kaplan; Rómulo Gallegos (novel)
- Produced by: María de la Paz Mariño; David Frost; Peter Rawley
- Starring: Esther Goris; Jorge Perugorría
- Cinematography: Héctor Collodoro; Carlos González
- Edited by: José Salcedo
- Music by: Bingen Mendizábal
- Distributed by: United International Pictures; Universal Pictures
- Release date: 14 May 1998
- Running time: 120 minutes
- Countries: Spain; Argentina
- Language: Spanish

Doña Bárbara is a 1998 Argentine-Spanish romantic drama film directed by Betty Kaplan adapted from the 1929 novel Doña Bárbara by Venezuelan author Rómulo Gallegos. The film stars Esther Goris in the title role of a wealthy, embittered female land owner who clashes with a male neighbor, portrayed by Jorge Perugorría.

== Other versions ==
Doña Bárbara was first adapted into an acclaimed 1943 Mexican film starring María Félix as well as a 1975 Venezuelan telenovela.
