= Waking the Dead (film) =

- Original theatrical poster
- Directed by: Keith Gordon
- Written by: Robert Dillon
- Based on: Waking the Dead by Scott Spencer
- Produced by: Keith Gordon; Stuart Kleinman; Linda Reisman
- Starring: Billy Crudup; Jennifer Connelly; Molly Parker; Janet McTeer; Paul Hipp; Sandra Oh; Hal Holbrook
- Cinematography: Tom Richmond
- Edited by: Jeff Wishengrad
- Music by: tomandandy Scott Shields
- Production companies: Gramercy Pictures; PolyGram Filmed Entertainment (uncredited); Egg Pictures
- Distributed by: USA Films (United States); Universal Pictures (International)
- Release date: March 24, 2000
- Running time: 105 minutes
- Country: United States
- Language: English
- Budget: $8.5 million
- Box office: $327,418

Waking the Dead is a 2000 mystery drama film directed by Keith Gordon and starring Billy Crudup and Jennifer Connelly. The screenplay by Robert Dillon is based on the 1986 novel of the same name by Scott Spencer.

== Plot ==
The film flashes back and forth between the 1970s and 1980s and centers on the relationship between Fielding Pierce, a young Coast Guard officer with political ambitions, and idealistic Roman Catholic Sarah Williams, who is drawn to programs designed to better the lives of the underprivileged and has mixed feelings about his career goals.

In the opening scene, Fielding sees a television news program reporting Sarah's death in a Minneapolis car bombing following a church-organized excursion to Chile to feed the poor and organize resistance to the oppressive Pinochet dictatorship. He never quite recovers from the news, and he finds himself increasingly haunted by the past, in which the couple were as romantically close as they were politically apart, divided by his desire to work within the system and her conviction that the system is the root of all evil. His obsession with Sarah slowly puts his career, forthcoming marriage, and sanity in jeopardy.

The question of whether or not Sarah actually was killed remains unresolved as Fielding's sister Caroline reports having seen her on the street some years later and Fielding himself supposedly meets her after being elected to the United States Congress, only to wonder afterwards if she merely was a hallucination.

== Cast ==
- Billy Crudup as Fielding Pierce
- Jennifer Connelly as Sarah Williams
- Hal Holbrook as Isaac Green
- Janet McTeer as Caroline Pierce
- Paul Hipp as Danny Pierce
- Molly Parker as Juliet Beck
- Sandra Oh as Kim
- John Carroll Lynch as Father Mileski

== Production ==
The film was shot in Montreal, Québec, with a budget of $8.5 million, between February 4, 1998 and April 6, 1998.

The character portrayed by Ed Harris was eliminated from the completed film, although he is seen briefly on a television screen. Sandra Oh appears in one short scene and has little dialogue; a longer scene with her was deleted but is included as an extra feature in the DVD release.

== Soundtrack ==
- "Snow Come Down" performed by Lori Carson
- "A Case of You" performed by Joni Mitchell
- "Maggie May" performed by Rod Stewart
- "Help Me Somebody" performed by Brian Eno and David Byrne
- "Mercy Street" performed by Peter Gabriel

== Reception ==
Waking the Dead received mixed reviews from critics and has an overall approval rating of 50% based on 56 reviews on Rotten Tomatoes. Metacritic, which uses a weighted average, assigned the film a score of 59 out of 100, based on 27 critics, indicating "mixed or average" reviews.

Waking the Dead debuted at the Sundance Film Festival in January 2000. It opened in Brazil one week later and Austria in February and was shown at the Santa Barbara International Film Festival in early March before going into limited release in North America later that month. It went on to gross $327,418 in North America, well below its budget.

In his review in The New York Times, Stephen Holden wrote, "In falling short of its goal, the movie raises the question of whether it's possible to film an intelligent tear-jerker that prompts us to think and cry at the same time. Or are serious suds and serious ideas a cinematic oxymoron? At its best, Waking the Dead suggests an intellectually upscale answer to Love Story. At its weakest, it comes off as a stiff, muted exercise in countercultural nostalgia ... [it] makes a terrible mistake by continually and abruptly cutting back and forth between the 70s and the early 80s. The movie is forever stumbling over itself and breaking its own spell. At exactly the moment it begins to draw us in to one of its stories, it makes another leap, and the mood is broken. Because it barely distinguishes between the two decades, the flashbacks have none of the resonance of treasured memories".

Roger Ebert of the Chicago Sun-Times wrote the film "has a good heart and some fine performances, but is too muddled at the story level to involve us emotionally. It's a sweet film. The relationship between Sarah and Fielding is a little deeper and more affectionate than we expect in plot-driven melodramas". Entertainment Weekly gave the film a "C" rating and Lisa Schwarzbaum wrote, "the arbitrariness of the lovers' passion and the somber hysteria with which the novelist and filmmaker treat every issue, whether it's South American dictatorship or female armpit hair, is enough to anesthetize the living". In his review for the Chicago Reader, Jonathan Rosenbaum wrote, "I can cite only one unequivocal reason for seeing Waking the Dead, and that's Jennifer Connelly ... What makes Connelly so remarkable isn't her character's radicalism but her capacity to keep the character fresh every time she appears and to leave a lingering impression that makes the hero's (and the movie's) sense of loss acute". In the San Francisco Chronicle, Mick LaSalle called it "a film teeming with riches. One of the most powerful romances of recent years, it is as generous as they come ... an intelligent tale told with go-for-broke passion ... Crudup and Connelly are splendid together ... Waking the Dead gives us acting at its biggest and most beautiful". In his review for the Los Angeles Times, Kevin Thomas wrote, "The seeming presence of Sarah creates a special challenge for Gordon and his stars, and that Waking the Dead deals with it so imaginatively, makes the film all the richer and provocative an experience".

=== Awards ===
Robert Dillon was nominated for the Independent Spirit Award for Best Screenplay but lost to Kenneth Lonergan for You Can Count on Me.

== See also ==
- List of American films of 2000
