= Jennifer Connelly =

American actress (born 1970)

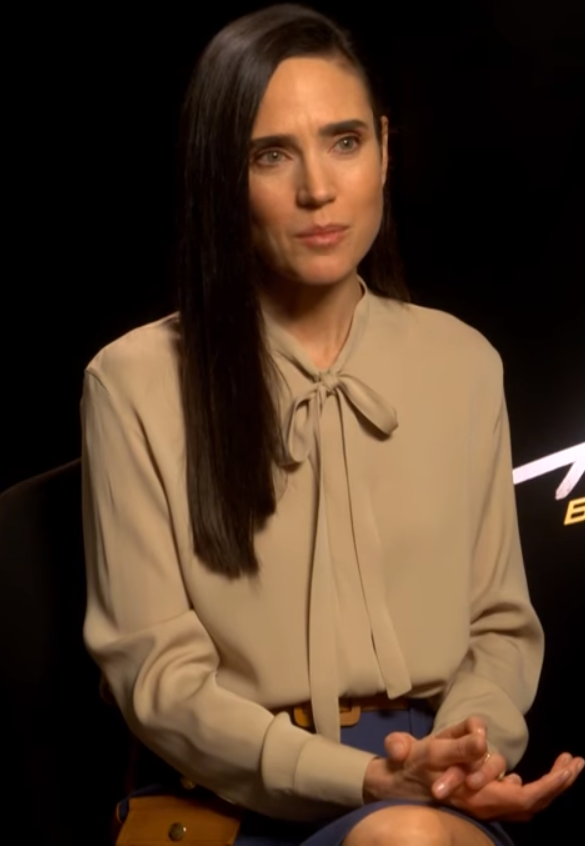
- Connelly in 2019
- Born: Jennifer Lynn Connelly; December 12, 1970 (age 55); Cairo, New York, U.S.
- Occupation: Actress
- Years active: 1982–present
- Spouse: Paul Bettany (m. 2003)
- Children: 3

Jennifer Lynn Connelly (born December 12, 1970) is an American actress. She began her career as a child model before making her acting debut in the 1984 crime film Once Upon a Time in America. After a few more years of modeling, she began to concentrate on acting, starring in a variety of films including the horror film Phenomena (1985), the musical fantasy film Labyrinth (1986), the romantic thriller The Hot Spot (1990), the romantic comedy Career Opportunities (1991), and the period superhero film The Rocketeer (1991). She received praise for her performance in the science fiction film Dark City (1998) and playing a drug addict in Darren Aronofsky's drama film Requiem for a Dream (2000).

Connelly won the Academy Award for Best Supporting Actress for her portrayal of Alicia Nash in the John Nash biopic A Beautiful Mind (2001), directed by Ron Howard. Her subsequent films include the superhero film Hulk (2003), the drama House of Sand and Fog (2003), the horror film Dark Water (2005), the psychological drama Little Children (2006), the thriller Blood Diamond (2006), the science fiction film The Day the Earth Stood Still (2008), and the romantic comedy He's Just Not That Into You (2009). In the subsequent decades, she took on supporting roles in Aronofsky's biblical epic film Noah (2014) and in the action films Alita: Battle Angel (2019) and Top Gun: Maverick (2022). She also starred in the science fiction television series Snowpiercer (2020–2024) and Dark Matter (2024).

Connelly was named Amnesty International Ambassador for Human Rights Education in 2005. She has been the face of Balenciaga and Louis Vuitton fashion advertisements, as well as for Revlon cosmetics. In 2012, she was named the first global face of the Shiseido Company. Magazines, including Time, Vanity Fair, and Esquire, as well as the Los Angeles Times newspaper, have included her on their lists of the world's most beautiful women.

== Early life ==
Jennifer Lynn Connelly was born on December 12, 1970, in Round Top, Cairo, New York. She is the only child of Ilene Carol (née Schumann), an antique dealer, and Gerard Connelly, a clothing manufacturer. Ilene was Jewish and was educated at a yeshiva, while Gerard was a Catholic of Irish and Norwegian descent. Ilene's ancestors were Jewish emigrants from Poland and Russia.

The family moved to Brooklyn Heights, New York City, when Connelly was one year old. Later, she attended Saint Ann's School. Gerard suffered from asthma, so the family moved to the town of Woodstock in 1976 to escape the city smog. Four years later, they returned to Brooklyn Heights, and Connelly returned to Saint Ann's School.

After graduating from high school in 1988, Connelly went to Yale University to study English literature. She has described herself as a conscientious student who "wasn't really concerned with having a social life or sleeping or eating much. I was really nerdy and pretty much stayed in the law school library, which is open 24 hours, most of the time I wasn't in class." After two years at Yale, she transferred to Stanford University to study drama. There, Connelly trained with Roy London, Howard Fine, and Harold Guskin. Encouraged by her parents to continue with her film career, she left college and returned to the film industry the same year. Connelly's parents divorced in 2000.

== Career ==
=== 1980–1985: Modeling and early roles ===
When Connelly was ten years old, an advertising executive friend of her father suggested she audition as a model. Her parents sent a picture of her to the Ford Modeling Agency, which shortly after added her to its roster. Connelly began modeling for print advertisements before moving on to television commercials. In an interview with The Guardian from 2002, she revealed that, after having done some modeling, she had no aspirations to become an actress. She appeared on the covers of several issues of the American teenage magazine Seventeen in 1986 and 1988. In December 1986, she recorded two pop songs for the Japanese market: "Monologue of Love" and "Message of Love". She sang in phonetic Japanese as she did not speak the language.

When her mother began taking her to acting auditions, a then 11 year-old Connelly was quickly selected for a supporting role as the aspiring dancer and actress Deborah Gelly in Sergio Leone's Jewish gangster epic Once Upon a Time in America (filmed 1982–83, released 1984). The role required her to perform a ballet routine. During the audition, Connelly, who had no ballet training, tried to imitate a ballerina. Her performance, and the similarity of her nose to Elizabeth McGovern's, who played the character as an adult, convinced the director to cast her. Connelly described the film as "an incredibly idyllic introduction to movie-making".

Connelly's first leading role was in Italian giallo-director Dario Argento's 1985 film Phenomena. In the film, she plays a girl who psychically communicates with insects to pursue the killer of students of the Swiss school where she has enrolled. During filming, she was attacked by a chimpanzee and was bitten on the finger. Connelly next had the lead in the coming-of-age film Seven Minutes in Heaven, released the same year. In a retrospective interview, Connelly said, "Before I knew it, [acting] became what I did. It was a very peculiar way to grow up, combined with my personality." She described feeling like "a kind of walking puppet" through her adolescence, without having time alone to deal with the attention her career was generating.

=== 1986–1999: Mainstream films ===
Connelly gained public recognition with Jim Henson's 1986 fantasy Labyrinth with David Bowie, in which she played Sarah Williams, a teenager on a quest to rescue her infant brother Toby from the world of goblins. Although a disappointment at the box office, the film later became a cult classic. The New York Times, while noting the importance of her part, panned her portrayal: "Jennifer Connelly as Sarah is unfortunately disappointing. ... She looks right, but she lacks conviction and seems to be reading rehearsed lines that are recited without belief in her goal or real need to accomplish it." In 1988, she began work as a ballet student in the Italian film Etoile which was released in 1989, and portrayed college student Gabby in Michael Hoffman's Some Girls.

In 1990, Dennis Hopper directed The Hot Spot, in which Connelly played Gloria Harper, a woman being blackmailed. The film was a box-office failure but Connelly was praised. Stephen Schaefer wrote for USA Today, "Not yet 20, Connelly has neatly managed the transition from child actress to ingenue". During an interview with Schaefer, Connelly commented on her first nude scene: "The nudity was hard for me and something I thought about...but it's not in a sleazy context". In the same year, director Garry Marshall considered her for the role of Vivian Ward in Pretty Woman, but ultimately felt that she was too young for the part.

Connelly's next film was the 1991 romantic comedy Career Opportunities, starring alongside Frank Whaley. People criticized the film for exploiting Connelly's body; the marketing included a life-size cardboard cutout showing Whaley watching Connelly ride a mechanical horse, with the caption "He's about to have the ride of his life". In an interview with Rolling Stone, Connelly said that a Yale professor brought it to her attention and "... that wasn't something I felt all that comfortable about". The big-budget Disney film The Rocketeer (1991) followed later that year, but failed to ignite her career. She played Jenny Blake, a Disney dilution of what was in the original work a Bettie Page persona, here the aspiring actress girlfriend of stunt pilot Cliff, "the Rocketeer". New York characterized the film as "pallid" but said of her performance, "Connelly is properly cast; she has the moist, full-to-the-cheek-bones sensuality of the Hollywood starlets of that period, but she's a little straight". She appeared alongside Jason Priestley in the Roy Orbison music video for "I Drove All Night" the following year, directed by Peter Care.

Connelly next appeared in Of Love and Shadows, a 1994 Argentine-American drama film written and directed by Betty Kaplan starring Antonio Banderas. In 1995, director John Singleton cast Connelly as a lesbian college student in Higher Learning. She then appeared in the 1996 independent film Far Harbor as Elie, a prominent person in a Hollywood studio who writes a screenplay based on her traumas.

In 1996, Connelly followed up with the neo-noir crime thriller Mulholland Falls, which featured the murder of Allison Pond (Connelly), mistress of General Timms (John Malkovich), and the investigation by a group of detectives led by Maxwell Hoover (Nick Nolte). New York wrote about a scene that reveals the link between Timms and Pond: "This footage is actually dirty. That is, it makes us feel like voyeurs when looking at it, but it's so juicily erotic that we can hardly look away". Regarding the nude scenes in the film, Connelly said: "It kind of shocked everyone who knows me that I wound up doing this movie, because I had always been so careful about nudity, it was very much a part of this character and I couldn't be coy or guarded or self-conscious—otherwise it wouldn't work. It was sort of a challenge I wanted to take on, I guess". Mulholland Falls was a box-office failure.

She began to appear in small-budget films which garnered praise from critics, such as 1997's drama Inventing the Abbotts, set in the late 1950s, in which she played the part of Eleanor, one of three daughters of the town millionaire, Lloyd Abbott. The critic from Entertainment Weekly thought Connelly gave a strong performance; writing she "raises the stakes any time she's on screen". Co-producer Ron Howard, who would later direct Connelly in A Beautiful Mind, said, "She not only was beautiful and seductive but gave some difficult psychological moments in the film a lot of depth and complexity. She had an extraordinary combination of talent and beauty, and I guess I stored that information in the back of my brain".

Her next appearance was in the critically acclaimed 1998 science fiction film Dark City, in which she played alongside Rufus Sewell, William Hurt, Ian Richardson and Kiefer Sutherland. Connelly portrayed femme fatale Emma, a torch singer whose husband, John Murdoch (Rufus Sewell), suffers from amnesia. As Murdoch is regaining his memories, Emma is kidnapped by Mr. Hand (Richard O'Brien) and The Strangers, who alter her memories and assign her a new identity. Author Sean McMullen wrote, "Jennifer Connelly is visually splendid as the 1940s femme fatale (Emma)."

=== 2000–2003: Worldwide recognition ===
In 2000, Ed Harris directed Connelly in the biopic Pollock in which she played Ruth Kligman, Jackson Pollock's mistress. Pollock received mostly positive reception, according to review aggregator Rotten Tomatoes. In the same year, she appeared as Catherine Miller in the Fox drama series The Street, about a brokerage house in New York.

She appeared in Darren Aronofsky's Requiem for a Dream, based on the novel of the same name by Hubert Selby Jr. Connelly was drawn to the script for its depiction of addiction and its effects on relatives; she played Marion Silver, the girlfriend of Harry (Jared Leto). The film also starred Marlon Wayans and Ellen Burstyn. Marion is a middle-class girl from Manhattan Beach who pursues the dream of establishing a dress shop, but becomes addicted to heroin and descends into a life of prostitution. Connelly prepared for the role by renting an apartment in the building where the character lived; Connelly isolated herself, painted, listened to music that she considered that her character would, designed clothes, and used the time to reflect about addictions and their origin. Connelly also talked to addicts and attended Narcotics Anonymous meetings with a friend who was in recovery. The cast garnered critical acclaim for their portrayal of physical and mental degradation.

The critic Elvis Mitchell wrote in The New York Times:

Ms. Connelly, too, whittled herself down to a new weight class, and it's her performance that gives the movie weight, since her fall is the most precipitous. By the end, when she curls into a happy fetal ball with a furtive smile on her face, she has come to love her debasement.... Her dank realization is more disturbing than anything in the novel, and Ms. Connelly has never before done anything to prepare us for how good she is here.

Also in 2000, Connelly appeared in Waking the Dead, based on the 1986 novel of the same name, playing Sarah Williams, an activist killed by a car bomb in Minneapolis while she was driving Chilean refugees. Initially, director Keith Gordon was reluctant to cast Connelly in this role as he did not consider her a serious actress. Her agent Risa Shapiro persuaded him to watch Connelly's performance in Far Harbor. Gordon later said: "There was a subtlety and depth even to her gaze that captured more of the relationship than I ever could have hoped for." About her role, Connelly said, "Waking the Dead was the first film I worked on where whatever I did felt like my own thing. I was really trying to make something of the part and threw myself into it, so that meant a lot to me". The New York Times described her performance, "As Sarah, Ms. Connelly captures a burning ethereality and willfulness that are very much of the period. And she and Mr. Crudup connect powerfully in love scenes that convey the fierce tenderness of a relationship whose passion carries a tinge of religious fervor."

The script of Ron Howard's 2001 biopic A Beautiful Mind, loosely based on Sylvia Nasar's 1998 biography of the mathematician John Nash, sparked her interest in the project. Connelly was invited to an audition after Shapiro sent the producers a tape with a clip of the then-unreleased Requiem for a Dream. She was cast by producer Brian Grazer, as Alicia Nash, the caring and enduring wife of schizophrenic man John Nash, played by Russell Crowe. Howard and the producers eventually chose Connelly and Crowe due to their onscreen chemistry. Connelly met the real Alicia Nash before filming commenced to learn about her life. Upon release, A Beautiful Mind was a critical and commercial success, grossing more than US$313 million worldwide. For her performance, Connelly earned a Golden Globe, an Academy Award, and a BAFTA Award for Best Supporting Actress. Time magazine critic Richard Schickel called her performance "luminous" and the actress intelligent and passionate. Roger Ebert wrote, "Jennifer Connelly is luminous as Alicia. Although the showier performance belongs to Crowe, it is Connelly's complex work, depicting a woman torn by love for and fear of the same man, that elevates the film to a higher level". A.O. Scott of The New York Times said, "There is, for one thing, Ms. Connelly, keen and spirited in the underwritten role of a woman who starts out as a math groupie and soon finds herself the helpmeet of a disturbed, difficult man."

Connelly said afterwards, "[A Beautiful Mind] is the film I'm really proud of and really love." In relation to previous roles, Connelly said:

There was a period where I felt like I wasn't quite being considered for the projects that I wanted to work on because maybe people were thinking. 'I'm not going to cast the girl who was in that movie for this adult project.' I've felt for a long time that this is what I want to do so I'm happy at this point to just take my time and work on projects that I feel really strongly about and the rest of the time just live my life.

Connelly starred in Ang Lee's Hulk (2003), because she was interested in his philosophical perspective on the Marvel Comics superhero. She played Betty Ross, a scientist and the former girlfriend of the main character, Bruce Banner. The film received mixed reviews and was a moderate success.

Next in 2003, she appeared in House of Sand and Fog, a drama based on the novel by Andre Dubus III. She portrayed Kathy Nicolo, an abandoned wife whose inherited house is sold at auction to the Iranian emigre and former colonel Massoud Amir Behrani (Ben Kingsley). After reading the script, Connelly said: "(the story is) moving and beautifully written. I liked the fact that there is no good guy and bad guy. I found it really compelling that both sides do things that are morally questionable, because life is often like that." Producer Michael London said about Connelly's portrayal: "I think she understood Kathy and knew in her bones that she could take this character and give her the kind of dimension that she had. I don't think there is another actress who could have played Kathy with such power and grace." The film was critically acclaimed, with a BBC critic commenting, "[Connelly] convinces totally as a selfish, desperate and lonely woman who confesses to her brother, 'I just feel lost'".

=== 2004–2009: Hiatus and return to film ===
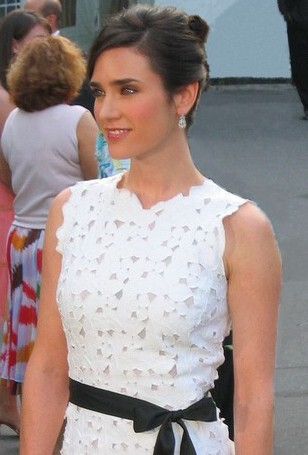
Connelly in 2005

After a two-year absence from the film scene, Connelly returned in the 2005 horror-psychological thriller Dark Water, which was based on a 2002 Japanese film of the same name. She played Dahlia, a frightened young woman traumatized by her past, who moves with her daughter to an apartment in New York City where paranormal happenings take place. In his review, critic Roger Ebert wrote, "I cared about the Jennifer Connelly character; she is not a horror heroine but an actress playing a mother faced with horror. There is a difference, and because of that difference, Dark Water works".

She played Kathy Adamson in an adaptation of the novel Little Children alongside Kate Winslet, a film which focuses on the relationship between Sarah Pierce (played by Winslet) and Brad Adamson (Patrick Wilson). Connelly co-starred in Blood Diamond opposite Leonardo DiCaprio where she portrayed journalist Maddy Bowen, who is working on exposing the real story behind blood diamonds. New York magazine praised her performance: "Connelly is such a smart, sane, unhistrionic actress that she almost disguises the fact that her character is a wheeze." Both Little Children and Blood Diamond were nominated for multiple Academy Awards.

Her next appearance was as Grace in the drama Reservation Road with Joaquin Phoenix and Mark Ruffalo, released in 2007. After her son dies in a hit-and-run, Grace gradually tries to overcome her grief, while her husband Ethan (Phoenix) becomes obsessed with discovering who killed him. By her own account, the character she played in the film proved tougher than any of her previous roles. USA Today's Susan Wloszczyna commented, "The strong performances of Jennifer Connelly and Mark Ruffalo ... raise the film above overheated melodrama".

Connelly portrayed astrobiologist Helen Benson alongside Keanu Reeves in the 2008 remake of the 1951 science fiction film The Day The Earth Stood Still. Unlike the original, in which Benson was a secretary and her relationship with Klaatu was the focus, the remake featured Benson in a troubled relationship with her stepson, portrayed by Jaden Smith. This was followed by a role in the 2009 romantic comedy-drama He's Just Not That Into You, which also featured Jennifer Aniston and Ginnifer Goodwin. The film was based on the self-help book of the same name. Variety magazine praised her portrayal: "Connelly gives a really rich performance as a woman whose principles back her into a corner."

In 2009, she appeared in the costume drama biopic Creation, in which she played Emma Darwin, wife of Charles Darwin, opposite her real-life husband Paul Bettany. Set during the writing of On the Origin of Species, the film depicts Darwin's struggle with the subject of the book as well as with his wife, who opposed his theories, and their mourning for their daughter Anne. The San Francisco Chronicle wrote, "Darwin's wife, a religious woman who disapproved of her husband's theories, is played by Jennifer Connelly, Bettany's real-life wife, in the kind of casting that doesn't always work, but it does here. We believe in the Darwins' history together, their familiarity and affection. Connelly's English accent is also as good as Renée Zellweger's and Gwyneth Paltrow's. She doesn't get just the sounds right, but also the music and the attitude". Connelly then voiced the character named "7", an adventurous warrior in the animated film 9.

=== 2010–present ===
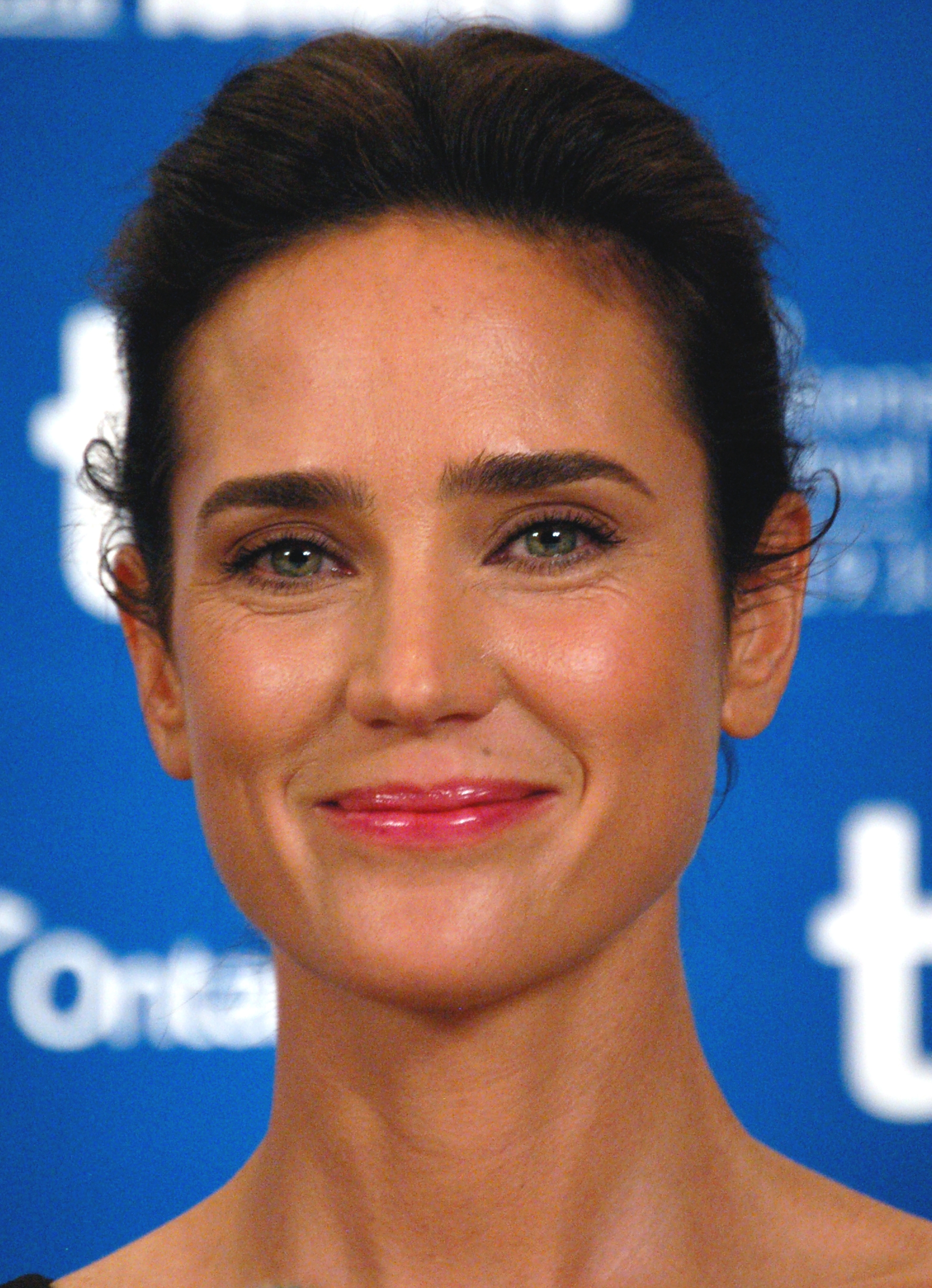
Connelly in 2010

Dustin Lance Black's Virginia premiered on September 15, 2010, at the Toronto International Film Festival. Two years later, it received a limited release in May 2012. Connelly portrayed the title role of Virginia, a mentally unstable woman who has a 20-year affair with the local sheriff, whose daughter then starts a relationship with Virginia's son. Connelly prepared for the role by watching documentaries on schizophrenia; she also spent time at the New York State Psychiatric Institute and the New York University Cancer Center to understand the affections and obstacles of her character. During preparation, Black requested Connelly's advice to design the set of Virginia's house, as well as the selection of the apparel to create the character's style. Connelly said of the film, "It's very original, I think, and a very different independent film – it's very personal." According to the critic from Cinema Blend, "Virginia is propped up by a strong central performance, with Connelly doing some of her best work in years".

In 2011, Connelly starred in Ron Howard's comedy The Dilemma with Vince Vaughn. Although the Austin Chronicle's review wrote "Vaughn nails it, and his nicely nuanced everyguy performance is aided by the always-excellent Connelly", the film opened to generally negative reviews. Variety magazine remarked, "Connelly, though a shade looser and more spontaneous than usual, seems stuck at an emotional remove from the action". Her next project, George Ratliff's Salvation Boulevard, premiered during the 2011 Sundance Film Festival. In the film, Connelly played Gwen, the wife of Carl Vanderveer (Greg Kinnear); the couple are members of the Church of the Third Millennium, led by pastor Dan (Pierce Brosnan). During the same year, Connelly recorded an audiobook version of Paul Bowles' The Sheltering Sky that was released in March 2012 as part of Audible.com's The A-List Collection.

Her next project, starring alongside Greg Kinnear, was the family drama Stuck in Love, the directorial debut of Josh Boone. Connelly played the ex-wife of Kinnear's character, with whom he is obsessed. The film was premiered during the 2012 Toronto International Film Festival. In 2015, Connelly starred in Shelter, the directorial debut by her husband, Paul Bettany. Connelly had a role in the 2014 film adaptation of the 1983 Mark Helprin novel, Winter's Tale, the directorial debut of Akiva Goldsman, alongside Colin Farrell, William Hurt and Russell Crowe; as well as starring in the English-speaking directorial debut of Claudia Llosa, Aloft.

Working again in collaboration with A Beautiful Mind co-star Russell Crowe, she portrayed Naameh in Darren Aronofsky's 2014 biblical epic Noah. The film opened to favorable reviews. The Washington Post declared Connelly and Crowe's performances "impressively grounded, powerful"; The Denver Post felt that Connelly portrayed the role with "fine intelligence". Variety deemed her appearance "solid but underused", while Detroit News stated "Connelly has too little to do, but when she lets go, she hits hard." Indiewire wrote that Connelly conveyed the role with a "steady hand", while St. Paul Pioneer Press defined her interpretation as "compelling".

Connelly starred in the television series Snowpiercer (2020–2024).

Working again with director Joseph Kosinski, Connelly portrayed Penelope "Penny" Benjamin in the action blockbuster film Top Gun: Maverick, which released in 2022 after a series of delays due to the COVID-19 pandemic.

== Personal life ==
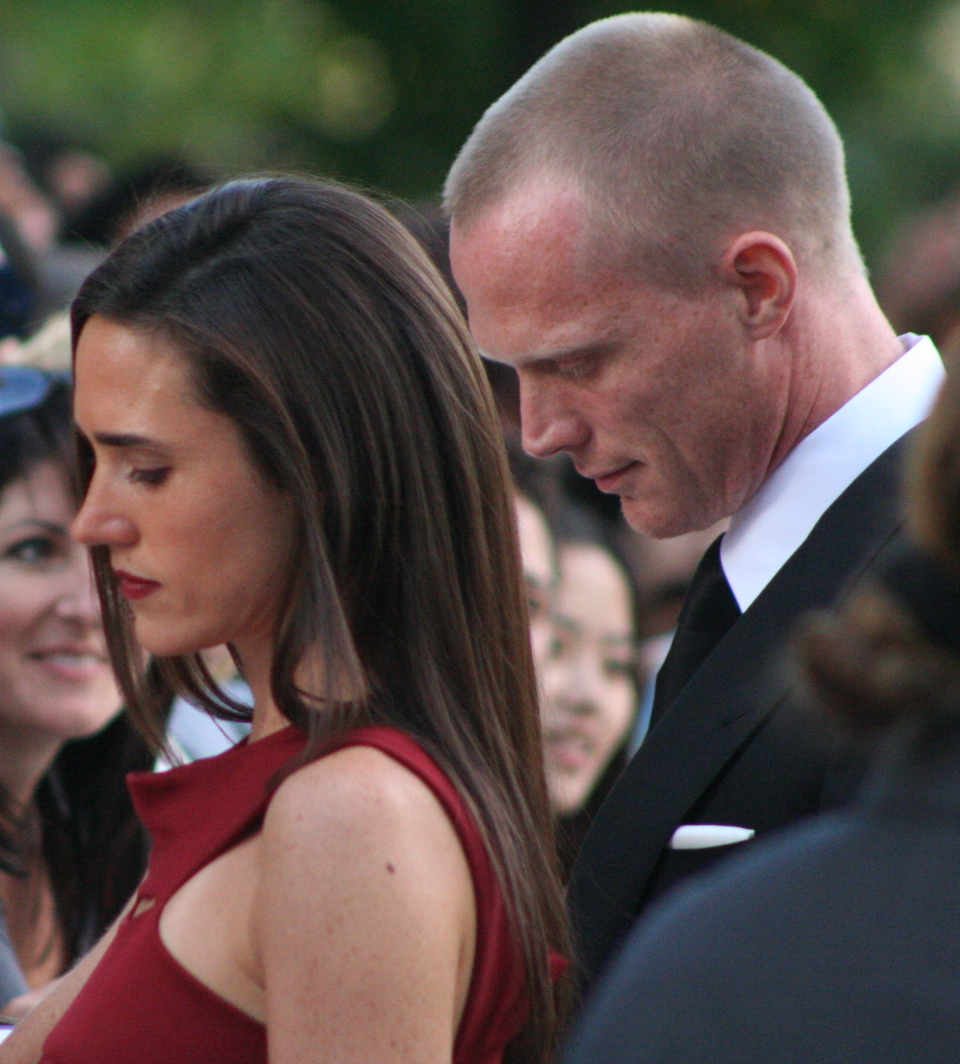
Connelly and her husband Paul Bettany at the 2009 Toronto International Film Festival

While filming The Rocketeer, Connelly began a romance with her co-star Billy Campbell. They became engaged but broke up in 1996 after five years together. Connelly then had a relationship with photographer David Dugan, with whom she has a son, born in 1997.

On January 1, 2003, in a private family ceremony in Scotland, she married actor Paul Bettany, whom she had met while working on A Beautiful Mind. They have two children, a son, born in 2003, and a daughter, born in 2011. After living together in Tribeca, she and Bettany moved to Brooklyn Heights.

=== Charity work ===
On November 14, 2005, Connelly was named Amnesty International Ambassador for Human Rights Education. She appeared in an advertisement highlighting the global need for clean water, and sought donations for African, Indian, and Central American drilling projects for the non-profit organization Charity: Water. On May 2, 2009, she participated in Revlon's annual 5k Run/Walk for Women. In May 2012, Connelly was named ambassador for Save the Children fund, to advocate for children's rights in the United States and worldwide.

== Public image ==
Publications such as Vanity Fair, Esquire, and the Los Angeles Times have ranked her among the most beautiful women in the world. Parisian fashion house Balenciaga and Revlon cosmetics signed Connelly as the face of their 2008 campaigns.

In February 2012, Connelly was announced as the first global brand ambassador for Shiseido, having previously worked with the company in the 1980s in a series of advertisements for the Japanese market. Since 2015, Connelly is the House Ambassador for French luxury fashion house Louis Vuitton.

== Filmography ==
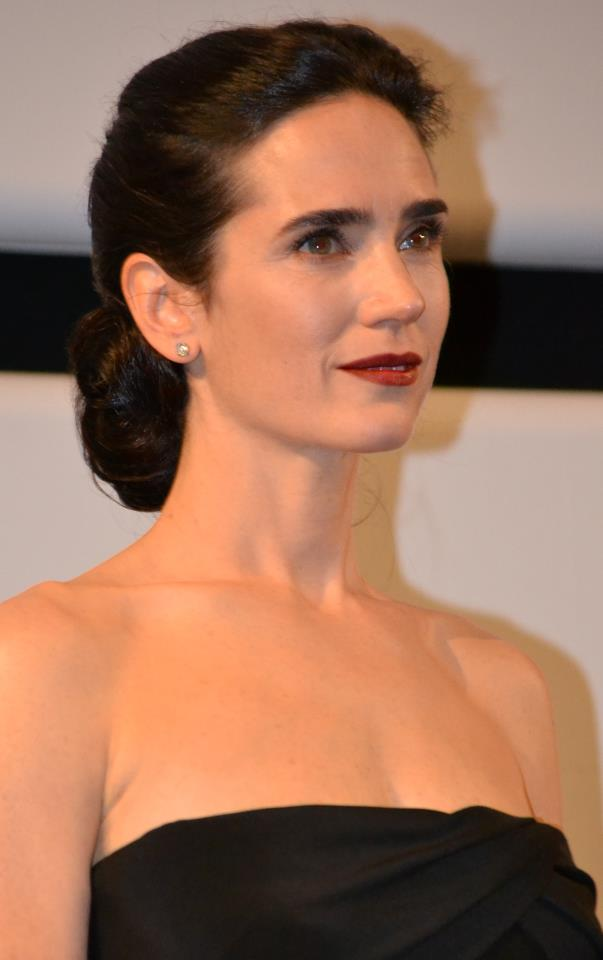
Connelly at the 2012 Cannes Film Festival

=== Film ===
Year	Title	Role	Director	Notes
1984	Once Upon a Time in America	Deborah Gelly (young)	Sergio Leone	
1985	Phenomena	Jennifer Corvino	Dario Argento	
1985	Seven Minutes in Heaven	Natalie Becker	Linda Feferman	
1986	Labyrinth	Sarah Williams	Jim Henson	
1988	Some Girls	Gabriella d'Arc	Michael Hoffman	
1989	Etoile	Claire Hamilton / Natalie Horvath	Peter Del Monte	
1990	The Hot Spot	Gloria Harper	Dennis Hopper	
1991	Career Opportunities	Josephine "Josie" McClellan	Bryan Gordon	
1991	The Rocketeer	Jennifer "Jenny" Blake	Joe Johnston	
1994	Of Love and Shadows	Irene Beltrán	Betty Kaplan	
1995	Higher Learning	Taryn	John Singleton	
1996	Mulholland Falls	Allison Pond	Lee Tamahori	
1996	Far Harbor	Ellie	John Huddles	
1997	Inventing the Abbotts	Eleanor Abbott	Pat O'Connor	
1998	Dark City	Emma Murdoch / Anna	Alex Proyas	
2000	Waking the Dead	Sarah Williams	Keith Gordon	
2000	Requiem for a Dream	Marion Silver	Darren Aronofsky	
2000	Pollock	Ruth Kligman	Ed Harris	
2001	A Beautiful Mind	Alicia Nash	Ron Howard	Academy Award, Best Supporting Actress
2003	Hulk	Elizabeth "Betty" Ross	Ang Lee	
2003	House of Sand and Fog	Katherine "Kathy" Niccolo	Vadim Perelman	
2005	Dark Water	Dahlia Williams	Walter Salles	
2006	Little Children	Katherine "Kathy" Adamson	Todd Field	
2006	Blood Diamond	Madeleine "Maddy" Bowen	Edward Zwick	
2007	Reservation Road	Grace Learner	Terry George	
2008	The Day the Earth Stood Still	Helen Benson	Scott Derrickson	
2008	Inkheart	Roxanne	Iain Softley	Cameo
2009	He's Just Not That Into You	Janine Gunders	Ken Kwapis	
2009	9	7	Shane Acker	Voice
2009	Creation	Emma Darwin	Jon Amiel	
2010	Virginia	Virginia	Dustin Lance Black	
2011	The Dilemma	Elizabeth "Beth"	Ron Howard	
2011	Salvation Boulevard	Gwen Vanderveer	George Ratliff	
2012	Stuck in Love	Erica	Josh Boone	
2014	Winter's Tale	Virginia Gamely	Akiva Goldsman	
2014	Aloft	Nana Kunning	Claudia Llosa	
2014	Noah	Naameh	Darren Aronofsky	
2014	Shelter	Hannah	Paul Bettany	
2016	American Pastoral	Dawn Dwyer	Ewan McGregor	
2017	Spider-Man: Homecoming	Karen / Suit Lady	Jon Watts	Voice
2017	Only the Brave	Amanda Marsh	Joseph Kosinski	
2019	Alita: Battle Angel	Dr. Chiren	Robert Rodriguez	
2022	Top Gun: Maverick	Penelope "Penny" Benjamin	Joseph Kosinski	
2023	Bad Behaviour	Lucy	Alice Englert	Also executive producer

=== Television ===
Year(s)	Title	Role	Notes
1992	The Heart of Justice	Emma Burgess	Television film
2000	The $treet	Catherine Miller	Main role, 12 episodes
2020–2024	Snowpiercer	Melanie Cavill	Main role, 24 episodes
2024–present	Dark Matter	Daniela Dessen	Main role and Executive Producer; 19 episodes
2026	VisionQuest	D.E.E.D.E.E.	Voice; episode: "Firewall"

=== Music videos ===
Year	Title	Performer	Role
1983	"Union of the Snake"	Duran Duran	Underground cult member
1984	"The Seventh Stranger" (from As the Lights Go Down)	Duran Duran	Girl in spotlight
1987	"Always with Me, Always with You"	Joe Satriani	Girl
1992	"I Drove All Night"	Roy Orbison	The young woman
2007	"Killers Kill, Dead Men Die" segment "The Interrogation"	Vanity Fair	The informer: Muriel Slade (still only)

== Awards and nominations ==
Association	Year	Category	Work	Result	Ref.
Academy Awards	2001	Best Supporting Actress	A Beautiful Mind	Won	
American Film Institute Awards	2002	Featured Actress of the Year	A Beautiful Mind	Won	
British Academy Film Awards	2002	Best Actress in a Supporting Role	A Beautiful Mind	Won	
Chicago Film Critics Association Awards	2002	Best Supporting Actress	A Beautiful Mind	Nominated	
Chlotrudis Awards	2001	Best Supporting Actress	Requiem for a Dream	Nominated	
Critics' Choice Awards	2002	Best Supporting Actress	A Beautiful Mind	Won	
Critics' Choice Awards	2004	Best Actress	House of Sand and Fog	Nominated	
Critics' Choice Super Awards	2021	Best Actress in an Action Series	Snowpiercer	Nominated	
Critics' Choice Super Awards	2023	Best Actress in an Action Movie	Top Gun: Maverick	Nominated	
Dallas–Fort Worth Film Critics Association Awards	2002	Best Supporting Actress	A Beautiful Mind	Nominated	
Empire Awards	2003	Best Actress	A Beautiful Mind	Nominated	
Fangoria Chainsaw Awards	2006	Best Actress	Dark Water	Nominated	
Film Independent Spirit Awards	2001	Best Supporting Female	Requiem for a Dream	Nominated	
Golden Globes	2002	Best Supporting Actress – Motion Picture	A Beautiful Mind	Won	
Hollywood Film Awards	2007	Supporting Actress of the Year	Reservation Road	Won	
Kansas City Film Critics Circle Awards	2001	Best Supporting Actress	Requiem for a Dream	Won	
Kansas City Film Critics Circle Awards	2003	Best Actress	House of Sand and Fog	Won	
Las Vegas Film Critics Society Awards	2000	Best Supporting Actress	Requiem for a Dream	Nominated	
Las Vegas Film Critics Society Awards	2001	Best Supporting Actress	A Beautiful Mind	Nominated	
Las Vegas Film Critics Society Awards	2003	Best Actress	House of Sand and Fog	Nominated	
Online Film Critics Society Awards	2001	Best Supporting Actress	Requiem for a Dream	Nominated	
Online Film Critics Society Awards	2001	Best Ensemble	Requiem for a Dream	Nominated	
Online Film Critics Society Awards	2002	Best Supporting Actress	A Beautiful Mind	Won	
Phoenix Film Critics Society Awards	2000	Best Supporting Actress	Requiem for a Dream	Nominated	
Phoenix Film Critics Society Awards	2001	Best Supporting Actress	A Beautiful Mind	Won	
SAG-AFTRA's Actor Awards	2002	Outstanding Performance by a Female Actor in a Leading Role	A Beautiful Mind	Nominated	
SAG-AFTRA's Actor Awards	2002	Outstanding Performance by a Cast in a Motion Picture	A Beautiful Mind	Nominated	
Satellite Awards	2002	Best Supporting Actress in a Motion Picture – Drama	A Beautiful Mind	Won	
Satellite Awards	2004	Best Actress in a Motion Picture – Drama	House of Sand and Fog	Nominated	
Saturn Awards	1992	Best Supporting Actress	The Rocketeer	Nominated	
Saturn Awards	2004	Best Actress	Hulk	Nominated	
Saturn Awards	2025	Best Supporting Actress on Television	Dark Matter	Nominated	
Vancouver Film Critics Circle Awards	2004	Best Actress	House of Sand and Fog	Runner-up	

== See also ==
- List of actors with Academy Award nominations
- List of Jewish Academy Award winners and nominees
- List of Golden Globe winners
