= Betty Kaplan =

American film director

Betty Kaplan is a Venezuelan-American film and television director born in New York City and raised in Caracas, Venezuela. She is Co-Chair of the Directors Guild of America Latino Committee. Kaplan has directed the films Doña Bárbara, Almost a Woman and Of Love and Shadows, the last one adapted from the novel by Isabel Allende. She has won several awards, among them the Peabody Award and many Audience Awards for her work. Often Kaplan writes, directs and produces her own film projects.

== Biography ==
Kaplan was born in New York to a Mexican mother and a Venezuelan father. Kaplan was raised in Venezuela and lives in San Juan, Puerto Rico.

== Work ==
Kaplan is also known as a prolific television director. Her television directorial work includes “One Hot Summer” starring Vanessa Marcil, Casper Van Dien and Jon Seda, shot for the United States network Lifetime Television and broadcast in 2009; Law and Order: Criminal Intent, directing the episode "Legacy” during season 7 (2008), which was the highest rated Law & Order Criminal Intent episode, with the ratings at 4.06 local and 3.8 National numbers; and an episode titled "The Journey" for the police drama series The Division during season 2 (2002) for the Lifetime Television network. This was the highest rated Original Series episode at 3.6 National numbers.

Kaplan gained prominence early in her directing career in 1983 with "Bolívar", an entire mini-series for television that Kaplan wrote and directed. "Bolívar" was financed by Venezuelan state television, dramatizing the Simon Bolivar historical saga, portraying the liberation of South America from Spain. The series was produced under the government of Carlos Andres Perez. The mini-series has reached the status of a popular annual television event in Venezuela. Kaplan also directed "Caminos Que Andan", a series of eleven documentary-dramas on the lives of Latin American writers that she filmed for the Televisora Nacional of Venezuela.

In Of Love and Shadows, an adaptation of a Chilean novelist Isabel Allende book, Kaplan gave Spanish actor Antonio Banderas his first English-language movie role; introducing Banderas to Hollywood. Jennifer Connelly was the lead in this film, convincing Latin Americans that she was truly from an upper-class Chilean background. Stefania Sandrelli (The Conformist) was also a lead in the film.

"El Numero Uno" is Kaplan's current film project is in pre-production. It will depict Venezuela's Johnny Carson, Renny Ottolina, its top media personality and national hero. Media moguls and politicians felt threatened by Ottolina's growing popularity forcing him out television, however he came back much stronger on radio. Venezuelans tired of corruption were looking for a political savior and Renny Ottolina decided to run for president to fill the need. Three months before the presidential elections, Ottolina was killed in a suspicious airplane accident. Kaplan had been a dancer in Ottolina's popular weekly television show and knew him personally.

Kaplan has also produced Spanish language music videos for Latino performers such as Mexican Pablo Montero and Argentine Raul DiBlasio. Yet her most legendary might be "La Papa sin Catsup" in 2003 that she produced for Mexican American singer Jenni Rivera. Currently she is working on over a dozen screenplays in various genres that are with major production companies for consideration.

Kaplan has also directed several television commercials, directed theater in Los Angeles. As Co-Chair of the Directors Guild of America Latino Committee, Kaplan organizes key events, including the screening of Guillermo del Toro’s Hellboy II: The Golden Army (2008); Michael Jackson's This Is It (2009), a documentary-concert film about singer Michael Jackson, directed by Kenny Ortega; and the Q&A of Rodrigo Garcia's Mother and Child (2010).

== Filmography ==
Short film

Year	Title	Director	Producer	Writer
1981	El violinista	Yes	Yes	No
1981	Neurosis on Wheels	Yes	No	Yes
1985	The Middlemen	Yes	No	No

Feature film

Year	Title	Director	Writer	Producer
1994	Of Love and Shadows	Yes	Yes	Yes
1998	Doña Bárbara	Yes	Yes	No
2022	Simone	Yes	No	No

TV movies

- Almost a Woman (2001)
- One Hot Summer (2009)

TV series

Year	Title	Director	Writer	Notes
1983	Bolívar	Yes	Yes	Miniseries
2002	The Division	Yes	No	Episode "Journey"
2008	Law & Order: Criminal Intent	Yes	No	Episode "Legacy"
