= John Irvin =

English film director (1940–2026)

- Born: John Charles Greenway Irvin; 7 May 1940; Wallasey, Merseyside, England
- Died: 11 August 2026 (aged 86); England
- Education: Durham School; Durham College; London Film School
- Occupations: Film and television director
- Years active: 1963–2016

John Charles Greenway Irvin (7 May 1940 – 11 August 2026) was an English film and television director. A three-time BAFTA Award nominee, he began his career by directing a number of documentaries and television works, including the BBC adaptation of John le Carré's Tinker Tailor Soldier Spy. He made several Hollywood films in the 1980s, including The Dogs of War (1980), Ghost Story (1981), Raw Deal (1986), and Hamburger Hill (1987).

== Early life and education ==
John Charles Greenway Irvin was born in Wallasey, Merseyside, on 7 May 1940, to Charles and Elsie Winifred (née Bending) Irvin. His father was a mechanical engineer who was involved in the construction of the Iran-Iraq Pipeline as part of the Royal Engineers. Irvin had a twin brother, David. He attended Durham School, where he sang in the choir, and Durham College, where he boxed and rowed competitively. He graduated from the London Film School.

== Career ==
=== Documentaries ===
Early in his career, Irvin was an adherent of the Free Cinema movement, directing vérité-style documentaries. His breakthrough was Inheritance, a 1963 documentary short about the Algerian War of Independence. In 1969, he traveled to Vietnam to shoot footage of the ongoing conflict for Movietone. He directed documentary short subjects Gala Day (1963), Carousella (1965), and the made-for-TV East of Howard (1966). His 1967 short Mafia No!, about Italian social activist Danilo Dolci, was nominated for a BAFTA Award for Best Short Film.

=== British television ===
In the 1970s, Irvin directed exclusively for television, including drama episodes and made-for-TV films. In the mid-1970s, he made Possessions (1974) and Haunted (1974) and the pilot for The Nearly Man (1974) and seven episodes in 1975. In 1977, he directed an episode for ITV Playhouse and did an adaptation of Charles Dickens's Hard Times. In 1977, he directed the BBC miniseries adaptation of John le Carré's Tinker Tailor Soldier Spy, which was nominated for a BAFTA Award for Best Drama Series and a Primetime Emmy Award for Outstanding Limited Series.

=== Hollywood ===
In the 1980s, Irvin made The Dogs of War (1980), starring Christopher Walken, which depicted a mercenary team attacking an African country. After that, Irvin made the horror film Ghost Story (1981), an adaptation of Peter Straub's novel. Irvin's other films from that period include Champions (1984), starring John Hurt and Turtle Diary (1985), a romantic-comedy film based on the novel of the same name that starred Glenda Jackson and Ben Kingsley. The story tells of a lonely man and woman from London who help a couple of turtles escape from a zoo. Soon afterwards, Irvin made Raw Deal (1986), an action film, starring Arnold Schwarzenegger about an FBI agent who extracts a bloody revenge against a Mafia organisation. After that, Irvin's next film was the Vietnam War story Hamburger Hill (1987), about a violent close-quarters battle in which US soldiers attacked a well-fortified North Vietnamese Army position. Irvin then directed Next of Kin (1989), an action film starring Patrick Swayze about a police officer who starts a clan feud against a Mafia family to exact revenge for his brother's death.

In the 1990s, Irvin directed Eminent Domain (1990), starring Donald Sutherland and Anne Archer. After that, he made Robin Hood (1991), which starred Patrick Bergin and Uma Thurman. Irvin's other films from the 1990s include Freefall (1994), Widows' Peak (1994), A Month by the Lake (1995), Crazy Horse (1996), the acclaimed City of Industry (1997), starring Harvey Keitel and Timothy Hutton, When Trumpets Fade (1998) and Noah's Ark (1999).

=== Later work ===
In the 2000s, Irvin directed Shiner (2000), which starred Michael Caine. The story tells about a boxing promoter searching for his son's killer. Irvin then directed The Fourth Angel (2001), an action film starring Jeremy Irons and Forest Whitaker. Irvin's other films from the 2000s include The Boys from County Clare (2003), Dot.Kill (2004), The Fine Art of Love (2005) and The Moon and the Stars (2007). Irvin released The Garden of Eden (2008), starring Mena Suvari and Jack Huston.

Irvin appeared as himself in the documentary feature The Writer with No Hands (2014), talking about the screenwriter Gary DeVore with whom he worked on The Dogs of War and Raw Deal.

His next film was the biopic Mandela's Gun (2016), relating Nelson Mandela's times as a guerrilla fighter for the ANC.

== Death ==
Irvin died from complications of cancer at his sister-in-law's home in England, on 11 August 2026, aged 86.

== Filmography ==
=== Film ===
Year	Title	Notes
1967	Bedtime	Short
1980	The Dogs of War	
1981	Ghost Story	
1984	Champions	
1985	Turtle Diary	
1986	Raw Deal	
1987	Hamburger Hill	
1989	Next of Kin	
1990	Eminent Domain	
1991	Robin Hood	
1994	Freefall	
1994	Widows' Peak	
1995	A Month by the Lake	
1996	Crazy Horse	
1997	City of Industry	
2000	Shiner	
2001	The Fourth Angel	
2003	The Boys from County Clare	
2005	Dot.Kill	
2005	The Fine Art of Love	
2007	The Moon and the Stars	
2008	The Garden of Eden	
2016	Mandela's Gun	

==== Documentary works ====
Year	Title	Notes
1963	Inheritance	
1963	Gala Day	
1965	Carousella	
1967	Mafia No!	
1969	Tomorrow Night in London	
1969	Medieval England: The Peasants Revolt	
TBD	Water from an Ancient Well	In production

=== Television ===
Year	Title	Notes
1966	Five More	Episode: "Strangers"
1974	Childhood	Episode: "Possessions"
1974	Haunted	TV movie
1974	Possessions	TV movie
1974–75	The Nearly Man	6 episodes
1977	Hard Times	Miniseries
1977	ITV Playhouse	Episode: "The Proofing Session"
1978	Life at Stake	Episode: "The Million Dollar Children"
1978	The Sunday Drama	2 episodes
1978	Power Struggle	TV movie
1979	Tinker Tailor Soldier Spy	Miniseries
1983	All for Love	Episode: "Down at the Hydro"
1998	When Trumpets Fade	TV movie
1999	Noah's Ark	Miniseries

==== Documentary works ====
Year	Title	Notes
1966	East of Howerd	
1966	Go Go Go Said the Bird	
1968	One Pair of Eyes	Episode: "Gerald Scarfe: I Think I See Violence All Around Me"

== Awards and nominations ==
Institution	Year	Category	Work	Result
Austin Film Festival	1995	Best Film	Widows' Peak	Won
Avoriaz International Fantastic Film Festival	1982	Grand Prize	Ghost Story	Nominated
Berlin International Film Festival	1984	Golden Bear	Champions	Nominated
British Academy Film Awards	1967	Best Short Film	Mafia No!	Nominated
British Academy Television Awards	1978	Best Drama Series/Serial	Hard Times	Nominated
British Academy Television Awards	1980	Best Drama Series/Serial	Tinker Tailor Soldier Spy	Nominated
Festival International de Programmes Audiovisuels	1999	Silver FIPA (Fiction)	When Trumpets Fade	Won
Harlem International Film Festival	2018	Best Director	Mandela's Gun	Won
Karlovy Vary International Film Festival	1994	Crystal Globe	Widows' Peak	Nominated
Mystfest	1997	Best Film	City of Industry	Nominated
