= Isaac Chocrón =

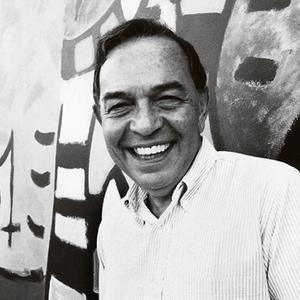
Isaac Chocrón Serfaty (September 25, 1930 – November 6, 2011), playwright and translator

Isaac Chocrón Serfaty (September 25, 1930, in Maracay – November 6, 2011, in Caracas) was a Venezuelan economist, playwright and translator. He was a graduate of Columbia University and Manchester University. He later directed the School of Arts at the Central University of Venezuela.

== See also ==
- List of Venezuelan writers
- Venezuelan literature
