= Shana Feste =

American film director and screenwriter

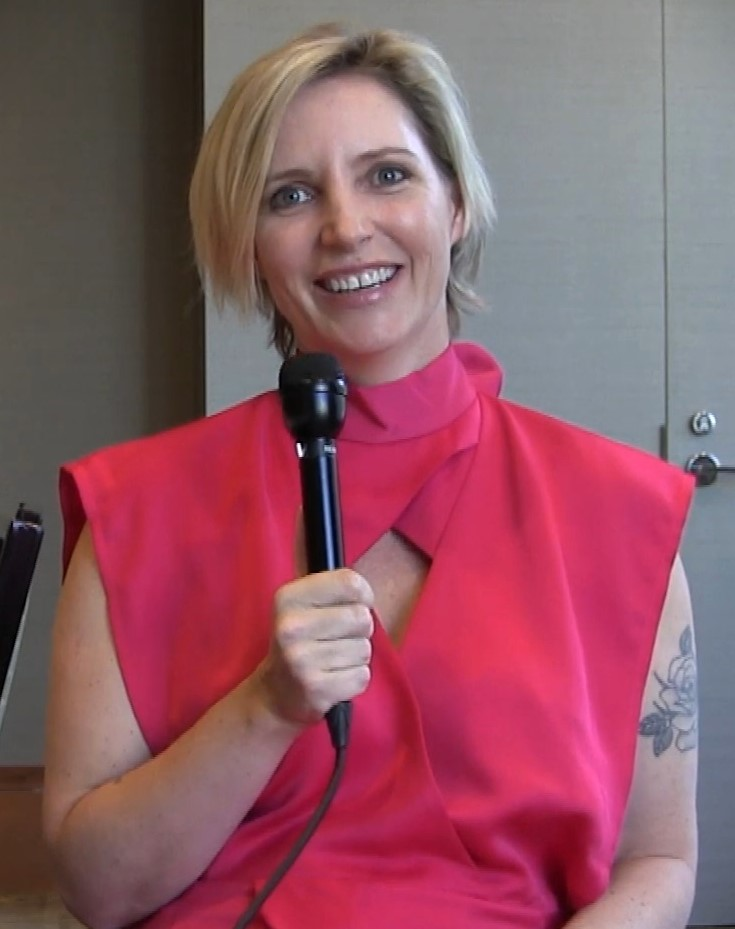
- Feste interviewed at the Seattle International Film Festival 2018
- Born: August 28, 1975 (age 51); Palos Verdes, California, U.S.
- Education: University of Texas at Austin
- Occupations: Film director; Screenwriter
- Spouse: Brian Kavanaugh-Jones

Shana Feste (born August 28, 1975) is an American film director and screenwriter. She has directed and written The Greatest, Country Strong, Endless Love, Boundaries, Run Sweetheart Run, and also has writing credits for You're Not You. She also teaches at the American Film Institute.

== Early life ==
Feste was born and raised in Palos Verdes, California. She has a sister. Feste attended UCLA. When her parents divorced, she spent summers at her father's in Texas. She earned a master's degree in Creative Writing and Screenwriting at the University of Texas at Austin and then studied Producing at the American Film Institute, from where she graduated in 2003. She worked as a nanny, waited tables and tutored to pay for her tuition. Following her graduation, she worked as an assistant at the Creative Artists Agency. She is married to producer Brian Kavanaugh-Jones.

== Career ==
Feste's directorial debut was The Greatest, which was screened at the 2009 Sundance Film Festival in the US dramatic competition section. The film is based on Feste's father who lost a son before she was born. It starred Pierce Brosnan and Susan Sarandon as parents dealing with the death of their son. The Greatest earned a Humanitas Prize nomination. In 2009, she wrote the script for music drama Country Strong, which she directed and was released in 2011. It was produced by Tobey Maguire, whom Feste came to know while she was a nanny, caring for his daughter. The film focused on recovering alcoholic country singer Kellie Canter played by Gwyneth Paltrow. The song "Coming Home" was nominated for an Academy Award for Best Original Song, but lost to Randy Newman's "We Belong Together" from Toy Story 3.

Also in 2009, Feste was hired to write a screenplay based on the novel You're Not You by Michelle Wildgen. Filming took place in December 2012. The film was set for release in 2013.

In May 2011, Feste was announced to direct an adaptation of Carolyn Turgeon's novel Mermaid: A Twist on the Classic Tale. The project is still in development. She directed the romance film Endless Love, a remake of the 1981 film. The film was released in February 2014. Feste next directed Boundaries starring Vera Farmiga and Christopher Plummer for Stage 6 Films, to be released on June 22, 2018.

Feste wrote and directed the horror film Run Sweetheart Run, which premiered in January 2020 at the Sundance Film Festival. The film was set to show at additional festivals and theatrically, but the COVID-19 pandemic stopped further release, at which point Amazon picked up streaming distribution. During the pandemic, Feste created, wrote, and directed the podcast Dirty Diana over Zoom. The podcast was picked up by Amazon for a streaming series adaptation with Feste returning to direct and co-write with Jen Besser again. The pair also signed a deal to adapt the story into a trilogy of novels.

== Filmography ==
Short film

Year	Title	Writer	Producer
2004	Jonah	Yes	Yes

Feature film

Year	Title	Director	Writer	Producer
2009	The Greatest	Yes	Yes	No
2010	Country Strong	Yes	Yes	No
2014	You're Not You	No	Yes	No
2014	Endless Love	Yes	Yes	No
2018	Boundaries	Yes	Yes	No
2020	Run Sweetheart Run	Yes	Yes	Yes
2026	Heartland	Yes	Yes	No
