= The Left Right Game =

Fictional podcast

- Genre: Serialized audio narrative; Science fiction; Horror podcast
- Language: English

Creative team
- Written by: Jack Anderson

Cast and voices
- Starring: Tessa Thompson; Aml Ameen; W. Earl Brown

Publication
- No. of seasons: 1
- No. of episodes: 10
- Original release: March 23 – May 25, 2020

The Left Right Game is a 2020 science fiction horror podcast written by Jack Anderson, based on his series "Has anyone heard of the Left/Right Game?" originally posted on r/nosleep in 2017. It is produced by QCODE, Automatik, and Tessa Thompson.

== Plot ==
Alice Sharman is a journalist who is investigating the story of a game which leads to an alternate reality. She joins up with a convoy of paranormal investigators led by Rob to investigate his claims.

== Cast ==
- Tessa Thompson as Alice Sharman / "Bristol"
- Aml Ameen as Tom
- W. Earl Brown as Robert J. "Rob" Guthard / "Ferryman"
- Dayo Okeniyi as "Apollo"
- Inanna Sarkis as Jen / "Lilith"
- Jojo T. Gibbs as Sarah / "Eve"
- Bryan Greenberg as "Ace"
- Robin Bartlett as Linda / "Bonnie"
- John Billingsley as Martin / "Clyde"
- Colleen Camp as Denise Carver / "Blue Jay"
- Jane Wall as Tom's mother
- Louise Lombard as Dr. Evelyn Moss
- Pat Healy as the Hitchhiker
- Anna Popplewell as Laura
- Glenn Plummer as Mr. Sharman
- Ellery Sprayberry as Mira Simmons
- Amy Letcher as Jasmine

== Episodes ==
No.	Title	Original release date
1	"Has Anyone Heard of The Left Right Game?"	March 23, 2020
Following a car accident that left him in a coma, Tom wakes up to three emails with recordings from his missing friend, journalist Alice Sharman. The recordings reveal an interview with Robert J. Guthard, a Vietnam War veteran living in Phoenix, Arizona who became fascinated with the supernatural following an encounter with a one-armed spirit in Aokigahara. Alice joins Rob on playing the Left Right game, which Rob discovered on a paranormal message board. In the game, riders traverse across the road by alternating between left and right turns at every possible turn until they enter a new world. They are joined by Apollo, paranormal YouTubers Lilith and Eve, siblings Bonnie and Clyde, Blue Jay, and Ace. Keeping with their tradition, Alice is given the call sign "Bristol" and rides with Rob. On the 34th turn, the two encounter the first sign of the game, a troubled, rambling woman near a mirror shop. Though shaken, Alice remains skeptical of the game.
2	"There's A Hitchhiker On The Road"	March 30, 2020
Tom contacts Alice's company, but they claim she had never worked there. The convoy passes through a tunnel that signifies the beginning of the game. After traversing down the road for a while, Rob stops the caravan and tells them to travel down the road one-by-one and pick up a Hitchhiker, but they are not allowed to talk to him. Alice comes close to acknowledging to the Hitchhiker after he mentions something personal to her, and the Hitchhiker taunts Rob by taking an old image of him. After dropping the Hitchhiker off, Alice notices a crashed car, which Rob feigns ignorance. Not believing Rob — he had inadvertently revealed the direction the crashed car was facing — Alice asks Lilith and Eve to investigate. As Alice works on her report, she listens to an ominous radio station broadcasting from Jubilation.
3	"You're Always Welcome In Jubilation"	April 6, 2020
Tom tries to convince his mother that Alice is real. Lillith and Eve show Alice a video of the crash and a bag taken from it, which was filled with C4 that was wired to a dead cellphone. Ace tells Rob that he had drove by the Hitchhiker, only for the Hitchhiker to appear in the car, leading Ace to develop a false memory of having picked him up. The convoy enters Jubilation, a seemingly perfect-looking suburban town when they stayed on the road. As they were leaving, they are stopped by a tree that was cut down, and forced to move around it one-by-one. Blue Jay purposefully moves slow, leading Ace to be captured, painfully hooked to a tow truck, and dragged back to Jubilation.
4	"This Ain't Our World"	April 13, 2020
Tom asks his university friends about Alice, but none of them remember her. Tom's mother books him a psychiatrist, Dr. Evelyn Moss, and he agrees to attend a session. The convoy grapples with Ace's death and become worried about the possibility of dying on the road. Conversely, Blue Jay reveals herself as a skeptic who went on the trip to expose Rob as a fraud and believes that everyone they had met so far, including Ace, were paid actors. She criticizes Alice for believing in the farce. Rob theorizes that the road was pushing back against a larger group and gives them until morning to decide whether they want to return home. Alice borrows a portable charger from Eve to charge the dead cellphone from the bag and reads its contents, but is interrupted by a paranormal voice talking to her. She breaks down from the events of the day and is comforted by Bonnie, who believes that everything will be alright once they reach Wintery Bay.
5	"Something New"	April 20, 2020
Tom talks to Dr. Moss about Alice and convinces himself to search for her. Everyone chooses to continue. Alice tricks Clyde to reveal to her that Bonnie had talked with the Hitchhiker, who had made her obsessed with Wintery Bay. Alice orders Clyde to tell Rob. After entering a cornfield, Alice notices a person walking towards the convoy. Terrified of it, Eve accidentally drives her and Lilith past the next turn, and their car begins to sink. Alice vaguely recognizes the person and is able to call him from a number from the bag's cellphone, though the person ignores everyone. Rob rigs a wench to Apollo's car as he drives out to rescue them, but Apollo sinks into the road while rescuing Eve. Lilith makes it to safety but Eve falls into the road and sinks as well. Lilith is devastated but remains adamant on continuing, joining Bonnie and Clyde's car.
6	"Stray Thread"	April 27, 2020
Tom breaks into the University of Edinburgh and learns that every trace of Alice on-campus had been erased. Alice listens to past recordings and becomes suspicious that Rob was hiding something about the road. Lilith blames herself for Apollo and Eve's deaths, as she had forced Eve to stay on the road after Eve wanted to turn back. Alice consoles her, and they bond while honoring their fallen friends. Bonnie tries to redirect the convoy down a wrong turn that leads to Wintery Bay. Clyde previously feigned talking to Rob about Bonnie; upon learning about what Bonnie did, Rob forces Bonnie and Clyde to return home the next day as Lilith joins Rob and Alice. Bonnie is restrained as she becomes increasingly hysterical, but she breaks free and turns into dust as she travels towards Wintery Bay. Refusing to separate with his sister, Clyde chooses to join Bonnie, and Alice accompanies him to the junction.
7	"Rob Guthard Takes On London"	May 4, 2020
Dr. Moss and Tom's mother reveal that they cannot hear anything from Alice's recordings and believe Tom to be mentally unwell. Tom travels to Bristol to visit Alice's parents. Lilith berates Alice for letting Clyde die while Rob accepts Alice's explanation. Blue Jay accuses Alice for killing Clyde and threatens her, and Alice accuses Blue Jay for freeing Bonnie. They arrive in a forest, which Rob announces was entering unknown territory. Rob begins talking about his son, Robert Jr., but accidentally hits a deer that gives birth to a human baby and is followed by a horde of deer that jump over a cliff to their deaths, pushing Blue Jay's car over the cliff in the process. The human baby rapidly ages and drags Blue Jay into the forest, but Rob rescues her, much to her chagrin at hurting the baby. Despite everything she had witnessed, Blue Jay still refuses to believe in the game and is convinced that everyone in the convoy, including Alice, was in on the ruse. She shoots Rob with his shotgun and forces Alice and Lilith to leave the car so she can take it and returns home. Lilith escapes into the woods with a radio and Alice jumps over the cliff with the keys to Rob's car.
8	"I'm Not Playing Anymore"	May 11, 2020
Mr. Sharman initially turns Tom away, but allows him in after he reveals personal stories about Alice. Neither Mr. Sharman or his wife, Penny, can remember Alice physically, though they remember the time they spent with her, which convinces Tom of her existence. He returns home to his mother worrying about him. Alice lands on the bodies of the deer and retrieves Blue Jay's radio from her car as Blue Jay shoots at Alice. She feels the presence of the paranormal entity that spoke to her and makes contact with Lilith over the radio. Alice finds a wounded Rob, who warns her that Blue Jay had overheard her conversation with Lilith. Alice tries to bargain with Blue Jay for Lilith's life and throws her bag with the car keys to Blue Jay, but Blue Jay mortally wounds Lilith as she tries to escape. Alice detonates the C4 in her bag and Blue Jay dies believing she was right. Lilith gives Alice her LED torch light and wishes they could have been friends for longer before dying in Alice's arms. The baby returns, grieves over Blue Jay's body, and attacks Alice, severing her right arm. Using the torch light, she forces the baby to age to its death. As she stumbles through the forest, she sees a static silhouette of a human that runs away from her. She realizes she was the one-armed spirit that Rob saw at Aokigahara and resigns to her death.
9	"Only Way Is Through"	May 18, 2020
Tom remains resolute on finding Alice and refuses help from his mother, but promises to stop once his search concludes. He borrows money from her and travels to Phoenix. Rob buries the child, Lilith, and Blue Jay, resuscitates Alice, and apologizes to her for the entire trip. Alice confronts Rob about his son's crashed car, and he tells her the truth. Following the death of Rob Jr.'s — whom Rob called Bobby — mother, he and Rob began bonding over chasing the supernatural. Bobby was the one who discovered the Left Right game, and the two slowly traversed and mapped the roads over the following two years. Bobby's wife Marjorie eventually joined Bobby on exploring the road. Upon learning their child was almost due, Marjorie convinced Bobby to go further down the road than they had ever went as a last hurrah, and she continued onward on foot after Bobby got severely injured. After recovering, Bobby found Marjorie insane on the 34th turn and became disillusioned with the game. He chose to go on one last trip before destroying the tunnel afterwards. Desperate to save the road, Rob ran Bobby off the road as he was heading back from Jubilation, accidentally killing him. Rob then planted the rules of the game on the paranormal board to prepare for his next trip, but has remained remorseful since. Alice tells him what she saw in the forest, and the two travel in silence until they reach a city. They learn the sound of the car was the only noise made in the city, and it draws the city's silent citizens towards them. They are unable to outrun the citizens and become stranded in the city. Alice intuitively guesses that the citizens react violently towards noise because they don't understand it. Realizing the road wants Alice to make it to the end, Rob stays behind to distract the citizens with his shotgun while Alice continues.
10	"The End Of The Road"	May 25, 2020
Tom meets Mira Simmons, the owner of a paranormal board, who maps out Rob's path through Phoenix. Though Tom is adamant that Alice wants to come home, Mira nevertheless questions whether she really wants to be rescued. Tom inadvertently begins down the road in the reverse direction, passing by the mirror shop without seeing Marjorie. Several days after leaving the city, Alice traverses across a lake until she encounters Marjorie's corpse stuck in the water. Upon pulling it out and burying it, she meets the Marjorie from the 34th turn, who attacks Alice. Marjorie was motivated to travel down the road after mistaking visions of Alice for herself. Alice mentions seeing Bobby searching for Marjorie in the cornfields and encourages her to join him. A gust of winds erupts around Alice as she finally meets the source of the paranormal voice. Alice figures out that the entity was responsible for the events that led her down the road. She surmises that there is no end to the road and considers turning around, but the entity, having watched her throughout her journey, knows she had already made her choice. Alice leaves a message directed to Rob, her parents, and Tom, and continues on her journey. Tom finishes the 34th turn at Rob's house and finds who he believes to be Rob. As Tom helps Rob into his car, Rob shows Alice's recordings, sent to him via voice messages, and Tom realizes that he had previously forgotten Alice's existence, and only remembered her upon seeing the recordings — at that moment, Alice was giving him the choice to remember. Tom sends himself the recordings, setting into motion the events that will lead to Rob's rescue, and is subsequently hit by a car.

== Reception ==
The series received positive reviews, receiving praise for the use of audio panning to create a surround sound experience.

=== Accolades ===
Year	Award	Category	Recipient	Result	Ref.
2021	iHeart Radio Podcast Awards	Best Fiction Podcast	—N/a	Nominated	
2021	Ambies	Best Production and Sound Design	Ryan Walsh, Matt Yocum, Will Files, Ryan Sullivan	Won	
2021	Ambies	Best Performer in Audio Fiction	Tessa Thompson	Won	
2021	Ambies	Best Fiction Podcast	—N/a	Nominated	
2021	Ambies	Best Scriptwriting, Fiction	—N/a	Nominated	

== TV series ==
Amazon Studios has secured the rights to The Left Right Game, Tessa Thompson will be an executive producer on the series. Jack Anderson will be writing the series and also serving as executive producer.
