= Dirty Diana (podcast) =

Fictional podcast

- Genre: Audio drama; scripted erotica; feminist; romance; sexuality
- Format: Audio
- Language: American English

Creative team
- Created by: Shana Feste
- Written by: Shana Feste and Jen Besser
- Directed by: Shana Feste

Cast and voices
- Starring: Demi Moore

Music
- Composed by: Deron Johnson

Production
- Length: 34 - 45 minutes

Technical specifications
- Audio format: MP3

Publication
- No. of seasons: 1
- No. of episodes: 6
- Original release: July 3 – December 21, 2020
- Provider: QCode Media

Related
- Website: dirty-diana.simplecast.com

Dirty Diana is an audio drama podcast produced by QCode about a woman who hosts an erotic website. A sex-positive exploration of a woman's troubled marriage, it stars Demi Moore and Claes Bang.

== Production ==
Demi Moore has had a long career as an actress playing sexy roles. Both MovieWeb and Los 40 noted that Demi Moore is known for her "alluringly raspy" and "ragged voice," which David G. Maciejewski attributes to her habit of smoking Red Marlboros. Demi Moore saw the podcast as an opportunity to explore sexuality and made a distinction between the podcast's sex positive message and adult entertainment or pornography. According to MDZ Online the podcast is a feminist podcast. Shana Feste is the director of the podcast. The podcast was created entirely over Zoom due to the COVID-19 pandemic. Demi Moore recorded the show from her bathroom.

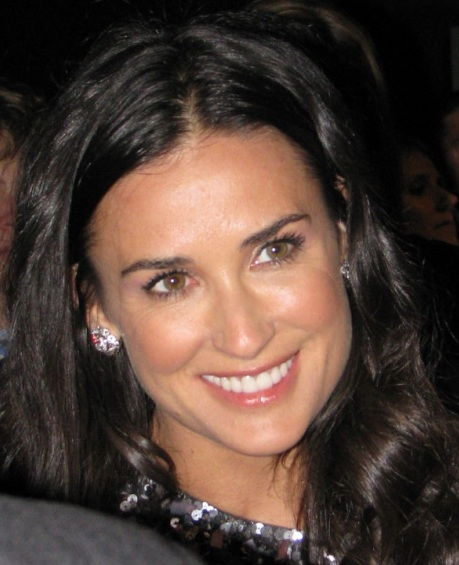
Photo of Demi Moore the starring actor of the podcast

=== Main cast and characters ===
- Demi Moore as Diana Wood
- Claes Bang as Oliver Wood, Diana's husband
- Betsy Brandt as Susan, Diana's therapist
- Mackenzie Davis as Amanda, a stripper that Oliver sees somewhat regularly (also records a fantasy for Episode 6)
- Carmen Ejogo as Petra, an heiress client at Diana's accounting firm
- Dayo Okeniyi as James, a veteran returned from Afghanistan who fills in for Liam
- Dolly Wells as Laurenne, Diana's friend
- Penelope Ann Miller as Cassie, Diana's friend
- Jon Tenney as Allen, Diana's boss as her accounting firm
- Rhys Wakefield as Liam, Diana's assistant running the website
- Lesley Ann Warren as Jean, Diana's disavowed mother
- Max Greenfield as Doug, Diana's co-worker; and as Jake, a chance bar encounter

=== Cameos ===
- Andrea Riseborough as Jasmine, recording as "Liz" (Episode 1)
- Lena Dunham as Lux (Episode 2)
- Melanie Griffith as Carrie (Episode 3)
- Gwendoline Christie as Evie (Episode 4)
- Rosa Salazar as Jada (Episode 5)
- Ava Grey as Erika (Episode 6)
- Chris Diamantopoulos as Brady, a real-estate client of Oliver's
- Lili Taylor as a marriage therapist for Diana and Oliver

== Format ==
Each episode spends about half an hour focused on a single character's erotic fantasy.

== Episodes ==
No.	Title	Length (minutes:seconds)	Original release date
Trailer	"Dirty Diana"	2:20	July 3, 2020
1	"LIZ"	34:01	July 13, 2020
2	"LUX"	34:36	July 20, 2020
3	"CARRIE"	34:58	July 27, 2020
4	"EVIE"	39:20	August 3, 2020
5	"JADA"	38:52	August 10, 2020
6	"AMANDA / ERIKA"	45:59	August 17, 2020

== Adaptions ==
=== Novels ===
Following the success of the podcast, co-writers Jen Besser and Shana Feste signed a deal with Dial Press (US) and HarperCollins (UK) to adapt the podcast into a trilogy of novels (Dirty Diana; Diana in Love; and Diana Says Yes). The trilogy was set for release in 2024-2025.

=== Television ===
In September 2020, Amazon announced that it won the rights to a television series adaptation. Demi Moore will return to star in the series, which also brings back writers Jen Besser and Shana Feste, who will also direct.

== Reception ==
The show won the 2021 Ambies award for "Best Scriptwriting".

== See also ==
- Sex-positive feminism
- Sex-positive movement
