= QCode =

Podcast production company

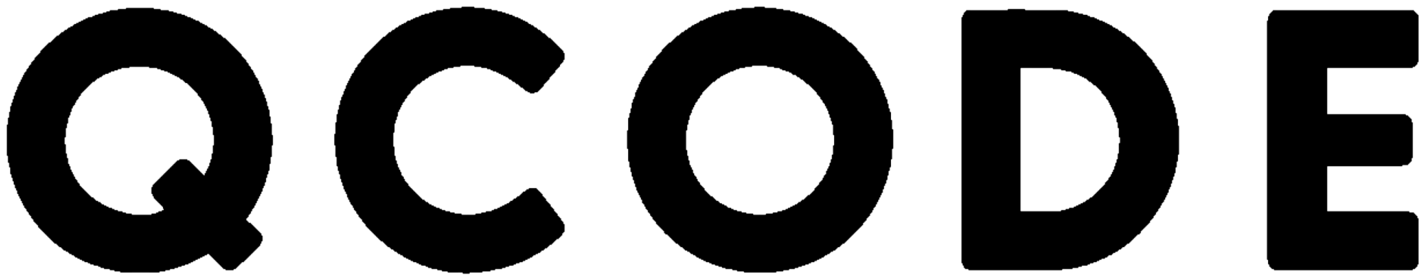
- Type: Podcast network
- Country: United States
- Availability: International
- Founded: 2019 by Rob Herting
- Key people: Sandra Yee Ling; Deron Johnson; Michele Zárate; David Henning; Steve Wilson; Tess Ryan
- Established: 2018
- Affiliations: Automatik; Grandview
- Official website: qcodemedia.com
- Language: English

QCode (sometimes stylized as QCODE) is a podcast network and audio production studio based in Los Angeles, California. The company was founded by Rob Herting in 2018 as a partnership between the production company Automatik and the management firm Grandview. The company focuses on producing scripted, narrative podcasts.

== History ==
QCode was founded in 2018 by Rob Herting, a former agent at the Creative Arts Agency. The network was founded as a partnership, with Automatik as the production company and Grandview as the management firm. Sandra Yee Ling, previously an executive producer at Automatik, is the vice president of production at QCode. The company's head of music is pianist and composer Deron Johnson. Michele Zárate, formerly of Sonar Entertainment, is the director of development, and Tess Ryan is one of the company's producers. Steve Wilson, formerly from Apple, is the company's chief strategy officer. David Henning is also on staff.

In 2020 QCode raised $6.4 million in funding by Sonos with participation by venture-capital firm C Ventures to scale up production to more than fifteen original podcasts every year. In 2021, QCode announced plans to launch QCode+ with Apple Inc. QCode+ will be a subscription based service that will offer twelve original shows with no ads and bonus material.

The company uses the Dolby Atmos audio standard, which was not supported yet by most podcast apps in 2021. The company also uses binaural recordings to create 3D audio effects, which is becoming increasingly popular among podcast networks like iHeartMedia or the Paragon Collective. Madeline Wells of SFGate, discussed the company's use of surround sound in their podcast The Left Right Game saying that "the sound is so good — don’t listen to this while driving or the jump-scares could get dangerous," and that the sound production creates a "riveting companion" when going on walks. Similarly, Andrew Liptak of The Verge cautioned against driving a car while listening to Carrier because the surround sound can be overwhelming at times and some sound effects—such as a truck honking its horn—can be alarming if operating a vehicle.

The company launched its first podcast—Blackout—in 2019, which starred Rami Malek. Herting's goal is to create new stories in the podcasting medium that have not been done in film or television. The actors and producers at QCode have a history of working in film and television, and the podcasts created by the company could easily be adapted into films or television series. Miranda Sawyer of The Guardian, noted that—in contrast to small indie productions—well funded audio production companies like QCode have a history of "making queer relationships straight, and (you guessed it) employing big Hollywood celebrities as actors." Rashika Rao of Radio Drama Revival had a similar complaint after listening to The Left Right Game saying, "I think a fundamental misunderstanding is that podcasting is TV lite." Rao went on to address the fact that large audio production companies like QCode have chosen to hire from the film and television industry rather than support independent podcasts that might have better ideas.

== Controversy ==
In May 2021, "Hold Still Vincent" a podcast dramatizing the 1982 murder of Vincent Chin, a Chinese American engineer, was removed from audio platforms by QCode after Chin’s family members and an activist involved in the case said they were not consulted about the project. The six episodes of “Hold Still, Vincent” were originally released May 26. A day later, journalist and activist Helen Zia, a central figure in the civil-rights movement sparked by Chin’s murder, posted on social media that neither she nor his estate were contacted about the podcast. Annie Tan, a cousin of Vincent Chin wrote on Twitter “I tried listening to the ‘Hold Still, Vincent’ Chin podcast (honestly the title is triggering to me as a cousin), and the disclaimer in the beginning that events were fictionalized for dramatic effects made me stop playing,” Tan wrote in part. “And it’s hard for me to say this because I want people to know my cousin Vincent Chin’s story. But I just don’t get it.”

== Shows ==
Title	Release Date	Genre
The Foxes of Hydesville	April 20, 2023	Supernatural
Peepkins	TBA	Children's Fiction
Last Known Position	December 20, 2021	Sci-Fi
The Burned Photo	September 30, 2021	Supernatural
Classified	August 7, 2021	Thriller
Edith!	June 21, 2021	Political satire, Biographical podcast
Electric Easy	July 19, 2021	Sci-Fi
Ronstadt	June 1, 2021	Horror podcast, comedy
Hold Still Vincent	May 25, 2021	True Crime
Bad Vibes	March 29, 2021	Horror podcast, anthology series
Soft Voice	March 17, 2021	Black comedy, thriller
Unwanted	February 10, 2021	Black comedy
From Now	December 10, 2020	Science fiction
Hank the Cowdog	September 14, 2020	Mystery fiction, Children's fiction
Dirty Diana	July 13, 2020	Erotic drama
Borrasca	May 25, 2020	Horror podcast
The Left Right Game	March 23, 2020	Science fiction, horror podcast
Gaslight	November 18, 2019	Horror podcast
Ghost Tape	October 26, 2019	Horror podcast
The Edge of Sleep	September 23, 2019	Science fiction, horror podcast
Carrier	July 15, 2019	Horror podcast
Blackout	March 19, 2019	Horror podcast

== Awards ==
Award	Date	Category	Recipient	Result	Ref.
Ambies	2021	Podcast of the Year	Dirty Diana	Nominated	
Ambies	2021	Best Fiction Podcast	Dirty Diana	Nominated	
Ambies	2021	Best Production and Sound Design	Dirty Diana	Nominated	
Ambies	2021	Best Scriptwriting, Fiction	Dirty Diana	Won	
Ambies	2021	Best Scriptwriting, Fiction	The Left Right Game	Nominated	
Ambies	2021	Best Production and Sound Design	The Left Right Game	Won	
Ambies	2021	Best Performer in Audio Fiction	The Left Right Game - Tessa Thompson	Won	
Ambies	2021	Best Fiction Podcast	The Left Right Game	Nominated	
iHeart Radio Podcast Awards	2021	Innovator Award	QCode	Won	
iHeart Radio Podcast Awards	2021	Kids & Family Podcast	Hank The Cowdog	Nominated	
iHeart Radio Podcast Awards	2021	Fiction Podcast	Borrasca	Nominated	
iHeart Radio Podcast Awards	2021	Fiction Podcast	The Left Right Game	Nominated	
iHeart Radio Podcast Awards	2021	Fiction Podcast	Dirty Diana	Nominated	
