= Dylan Bruno =

American actor (born 1972)

- Born: September 6, 1972 (age 53); Milford, Connecticut, U.S.
- Education: Massachusetts Institute of Technology (BS)
- Occupations: Actor; model
- Years active: 1995–present
- Spouse: Emmeli Hultquist (m. 2006)
- Children: 2
- Relatives: Chris Bruno (brother)

Dylan Bruno (born September 6, 1972) is an American actor and former model. His first major film role was a supporting part in Steven Spielberg's Saving Private Ryan (1998), followed by a lead role in the horror film The Rage: Carrie 2 (1999). On television, Bruno portrayed FBI agent Colby Granger in Numb3rs and disgraced former Army Ranger Jason Paul Dean in NCIS.

== Early life ==
Bruno was born in Milford, Connecticut, to actor Scott Bruno and the late Nancy (née Mendillo) Bruno. His older brother is film and television actor, director and producer Chris Bruno. Growing up, the brothers lived in Milford with their mother and spent time with their father on the Upper West Side of Manhattan. Both brothers graduated from Hamden Hall Country Day School, a private college prep school in Hamden, Connecticut.

In 1994, Bruno earned a Bachelor of Science degree in Environmental Engineering from MIT, where he played varsity football as a linebacker. "When I got into MIT, I just decided it was an opportunity I didn't want to turn down," he said. "I actually found out that I had the second-lowest SAT scores at MIT. The guy with the lowest score and I would always hang out together and be like, 'Yeah, we're the second-to-last and last dumbest guy in the school.'" Upon graduating, Bruno worked for a robotics company before deciding to pursue a career in acting.

== Career ==
In 1995, while working as a model for Calvin Klein, Bruno made his television acting debut on the NBC series High Sierra Search and Rescue. He made his film debut in Naked Ambition (1997). In 1998, he had small roles in Saving Private Ryan and When Trumpets Fade and competed in and won a special episode of American Gladiators (1989–96). He co-starred in The Rage: Carrie 2 (1999), Where the Heart Is (2000), Going Greek (2001).

He portrayed an L.A.P.D. cop in The One (2001), a rock musician in The Simian Line (2001), and Harry "Blaine" Mayhugh, Jr., in The Pennsylvania Miners' Story (2002). He also appeared in The Anarchist Cookbook (2002).

Bruno had a five-year run as Colby Granger on the hit TV show Numbers from 2005 to 2010, starting in season two.

In May 2010, he joined NCIS for three episodes, playing a disgraced U.S. Army Ranger who worked for a Mexican drug cartel; in the Season 7 finale, his character died in a gunfight.

Bruno has done voice-over work for several products such as Bacardi Silver, Coors Light, Chevrolet, Jeep, Virtual Boy, and Sony Handycam. In addition to his voice-over work, Bruno is the current narrator of the TLC and Discovery Channel program Rides.

== Personal life ==
Bruno is married to Emmeli Hultquist and has two sons. He surfs, skis, and is an avid spearfisher.

== Filmography ==
=== Film ===
Year	Film	Role	Notes
1997	When Trumpets Fade	Sgt. Talbot	Television film
1998	Saving Private Ryan	Private First Class Toynbe	
1999	The Rage: Carrie 2	Mark	
2000	The Simian Line	Billy	
2000	Where the Heart Is	Willy Jack Pickens	
2001	Going Greek	Jake	
2001	The One	Yates	
2002	The Fastest Man in the World	Jake	
2002	The Anarchist Cookbook	Johnny Black	
2002	The Pennsylvania Miners' Story	Blaine Mayhugh	Television film
2003	The Break	Dane Patterson	
2003	Grand Theft Parsons	Traffic Cop	
2007	Last of the Romantics	Chet Dickman	
2008	Quid Pro Quo	Scott	
2011	Fixing Pete	Pete Camden	Television film
2011	Interception	Paul	Short film
2014	Taken 3	Smith	
2015	Official Killers	Jimmy	Short film
2016	A Remarkable Life	Max	
2017	Sin Cielo	The American	Short film
2017	Behind Enemy Lines	Scott Byrne	Television film
2018	Deadly Lessons	Richard	Television film
2018	A Stolen Life (Deadly Lessons)	Richard	Television film

=== Television and podcasts ===
Year	Film	Role	Notes
1995	High Sierra Search and Rescue	Scott	Episode: "Past, Present"
1996	High Incident	Officer Andy Lightner	10 episodes
1997	Promised Land	Mickey Wallace	Episode: "Intolerance"
1997	Nash Bridges	Brad Armitage	Episode: "Ripcord"
2001	Touched by an Angel	Ricky Jessup	Episode: "Most Likely to Succeed"
2003	CSI: Miami	Todd	1 episode
2004	Karen Sisco	Detective Rollins	Episode: "He Was a Friend of Mine"
2004	North Shore	Trey Chase	2 episodes
2005	Sex, Love & Secrets	Billy Garrity	6 episodes
2005–10	Numbers	Special Agent Colby Granger	93 episodes
2006	The Dead Zone	Felps / Massey	Episode: "Independence Day"
2010	NCIS	Jason Paul Dean	2 episodes
2010	Bones	Trevor Bartlett	Episode: "The Mastodon in the Room"
2011	Grey's Anatomy	Griffin Lewis	2 episodes
2011	The Mentalist	Dean Puttock	Episode: "Red Gold"
2012	Black Box	Joey	Episode: "AEZP: The Reawakening"
2014	NCIS: Los Angeles	Robert Brown	Episode: "War Cries"
2014	Agents of S.H.I.E.L.D.	Rooster	Episode: "Yes Men"
2014	Major Crimes	Keith Price	Episode: "Sweet Revenge"
2015	Narcos	Barry Seal	1 episode
2016	Rizzoli and Isles	Bryce	1 episode
2016	Notorious	Coach Phil Ryder	Episode: "Tell Me a Secret"
2017	Hawaii Five-0	Lee Campbell	1 episode
2018	SEAL Team	Deke	1 episode
2019	Hell's Kitchen	Himself	Episode: "Poor Trev"
2019	Carrier	Agent Brauer, Grumpy Trucker, Huge Trucker (voice)	Podcast
2020	Thumb Runner	Johnny McFury	10 episodes
2020	Borrasca	Kevin Vanderveld (voice)	Horror audio drama and podcast series
2023	Magnum P.I.	Agitator	1 episode
