= Movement director =

A movement director creates physical vocabularies through actor movement in various production settings, including theatre, television, film, opera, fashion, and animation.

== Background ==
Movement directors work with directors, performers and other members of the creative team to develop the physical language of a production. Their work may include devising movement, researching physical behaviour, and developing exercises or training methods for performers. The movement director may create and research information about etiquette, proxemics, gestural language, social codes, a character's condition (related to medical conditions within their historical context, and factors such as inebriation, pregnancy, etc.), and personal journey (e.g., ageing). They are also responsible for specialist movement such as period dances, falling techniques, acrobatics, animal work, and chorus movements.

Although choreography may be part of a movement director's skill set, not all choreographers are movement directors. For instance, primate movement consultant Peter Elliot worked on Greystoke: The Legend of Tarzan, Lord of the Apes, showcasing specialized movement consulting that diverges from traditional choreography. In recent years, fashion campaigns and shows have employed movement directors like Stephen Galloway and Ryan Heffington to enhance the presentation of models and clothing on runways.

== History ==
=== In Britain ===
The title of "movement director" has existed since the early 20th century, although rarely mentioned in credits. The National Theatre created the role "Head of Movement", first held by Jane Gibson. Glynn MacDonald has long been the Master of Movement at the Shakespeare's Globe, while Struan Leslie became the Royal Shakespeare Company's head of movement in 2009.

Contemporary movement directors discussed by Ayse Tashkiran include Jane Gibson, Kate Flatt, Sue Lefton, Struan Leslie, Steven Hoggett, Polly Bennett, and Toby Sedgwick. The influences of Jacques Lecoq and Rudolf Laban have been foundational in British theatre movement, shaping practitioners like Claude Chagrin and Michel Saint-Denis.

In 2020, the Movement Directors in Contemporary Theatre: Conversations on Craft by Ayse Tashkiran was published, marking the first book dedicated to contemporary movement direction practices. In 2022, Kate Flatt published Movement Direction: Developing Physical Narrative for Performance.

=== Contemporary developments ===
Movement directors have been advocating for formal recognition of their profession. Training programs are available at institutions like the Royal Central School of Speech and Drama, where Ayse Tashkiran leads the Master of Arts/Master of Fine Arts programme in Movement: Directing and Teaching. Gavin Robins is the head of movement at the Australian National Institute of Dramatic Art (NIDA); his work includes King Kong in Melbourne and on Broadway, and the Sydney Olympic Opening Ceremony. In 2020, the Movement Director's Association was established to represent professionals in the UK.
