= Endless Love (2014 American film) =

2014 romantic drama film by Shana Feste

- Theatrical release poster
- Directed by: Shana Feste
- Written by: Shana Feste; Joshua Safran
- Based on: Endless Love by Scott Spencer
- Produced by: Scott Stuber; Pamela Abdy; Josh Schwartz; Stephanie Savage
- Starring: Alex Pettyfer; Gabriella Wilde; Bruce Greenwood; Joely Richardson; Robert Patrick
- Cinematography: Andrew Dunn
- Edited by: Maryann Brandon
- Music by: Christophe Beck
- Production companies: Bluegrass Films; Fake Empire
- Distributed by: Universal Pictures
- Release date: February 14, 2014
- Running time: 105 minutes
- Country: United States
- Language: English
- Budget: $20 million
- Box office: $34.7 million

Endless Love is a 2014 American romantic drama film directed by Shana Feste and co-written by Feste with Joshua Safran. A second adaptation of Scott Spencer's novel (following the 1981 film starring Brooke Shields), the film stars Alex Pettyfer, Gabriella Wilde, Bruce Greenwood, Joely Richardson and Robert Patrick.

The film was released on February 14, 2014, by Universal Pictures in the United States and United Kingdom. It received generally negative reviews from critics.

== Plot ==
17-year-old Jade Butterfield, a privileged high school graduate with few friends, has focused on her studies rather than a social life because her father secured her a prestigious medical internship. David, another senior, has had a crush on her for years but never acted on it.

For her graduation gift, Jade asks her parents for a party and invites her entire class. When the event is initially attended only by her parents' adult friends, David redirects the rest of the graduating class from a competing party in the same venue to Jade's room. Jade and David are nearly caught kissing. Hugh disapproves of David, feeling he will adversely affect his daughter's future in medical school.

David makes a failed attempt to please Hugh by fixing a car which belonged to Jade's late brother Chris. Late that night, Jade and David make love. Jade declines her internship to spend the summer with David, and Hugh decides to take the family away to their lake house. Jade is upset, knowing Hugh's motive is to distance her from David, so she brings David to the lake house as her brother Keith brought his girlfriend Sabine. Anne asks him to give David a chance.

One night, David catches Hugh cheating on Anne; the following morning, Hugh intimidates David into keeping quiet about it. David and Jade, along with their friends Mace, Jenny, Keith, and Sabine, sneak into the zoo after hours. Jealous of David and Jade, Jenny calls the police; when they arrive, David stays behind so the others can escape. Hugh bails him out of jail on the condition he end it with Jade.

Hugh lies to Jade, saying that David has abandoned her, but she does not believe him and escapes in the family car. David meets Mace at a diner. Mace has secretly invited Jenny to join them, hoping to remind David that he had friends and a life before he began dating Jade. Jade walks in as Jenny attempts to get close to David, assumes he is cheating, and storms out of the restaurant. Jade and David have a fight which ends with her driving off and getting into an accident.

At the hospital, Hugh hands David's father Harry a restraining order to keep David away from Jade. She tries to contact David, having realized he had not been unfaithful, but Harry refuses to allow it, reminding her of the restraining order. Over the next few months, David and Jade each try to see other people, but both are unhappy.

David runs into Anne at a bookstore, where she tells him she admires his and Jade's love and arranges for them to meet. They reaffirm their love and plan to run away that night. Meanwhile, Anne confronts Hugh about his obsession with destroying David.

At home, Hugh fights with Keith, who announces he is moving in with Sabine. Anne opts to join them. Inside the house, Hugh finds Jade preparing to leave with David and knocks over a lit candle in a rage. He then charges outside to attack David. Jade rushes to David's defense, proclaiming that Hugh is the one who tore the family apart.

The defeated Hugh goes back inside, discovering the fire started in Chris's room. David runs in to save Hugh, who is struggling to gather up Chris' possessions. When David falls unconscious, Hugh drops everything and helps him to safety instead. Outside, they put aside their differences while waiting for medical attention.

Anne and Hugh permanently separate. Later, Jade and David serve as maid of honor and best man at Keith and Sabine's wedding. That night, both couples camp on the beach, where Jade fondly reflects on the enduring power of her first love..

== Cast ==
- Alex Pettyfer as David Elliot
- Gabriella Wilde as Jade Butterfield
- Bruce Greenwood as Hugh Butterfield
- Joely Richardson as Anne Butterfield
- Robert Patrick as Harry Elliot
- Rhys Wakefield as Keith Butterfield
- Dayo Okeniyi as Mace
- Emma Rigby as Jenny
- Anna Enger as Sabine
- Patrick Johnson as Chris Butterfield
- Alexandra Bartee as Kelly
- Sharon Conley as Dr. Edie Watanabe
- Stephanie Northrup as Dawn Besser
- Matt Withers as Miles

== Production ==
Emma Roberts was originally offered the role of Jade, which she turned down. Sophie Lowe, Gabriella Wilde, Sarah Bolger, and Olivia Cooke were on the final shortlist for the role; Wilde was ultimately cast.

Principal photography began in May 2013 in Georgia. Filming wrapped in July 2013. Scenes were shot in Savannah, Georgia, Fayette County, Georgia, Butts County, Georgia at Lake Jackson, and at the Atlanta Botanical Garden.

== Soundtrack ==
End title track "Don't Find Another Love" was sung by Tegan and Sara and written by Golden Globe award-winning composer Julie Frost. Singer/songwriter Skylar Grey's cover of Robert Palmer's "Addicted to Love" was used for the trailer of the film. In addition, the song "Explosions" by Ellie Goulding was used in trailers adapted as television commercials. Another song which was taken is the track "Pumpin Blood" by the Swedish dance-pop group NoNoNo.

Director Shana Feste had considered using the original film's iconic theme song in one scene but eventually decided against it.

== Release ==
The first trailer was released on December 23, 2013. The film earned a domestic gross of $23,438,250, barely over its estimated production budget of $20 million.

=== Home media ===
Endless Love was released on DVD and Blu-ray on May 27, 2014.

== Reception ==
On review aggregator Rotten Tomatoes, the film has an approval rating of 15% based on 91 reviews, with an average rating of 3.9/10. The website's consensus reads: "Blander than the original Endless Love and even less faithful to the source material, this remake is clichéd and unintentionally silly." On Metacritic, the film has a score of 30 out of 100, based on 32 critics, indicating "generally unfavorable" reviews.

Peter Travers of Rolling Stone wrote: "This Endless Love is a photo shoot, not a movie. It'd play better as a slideshow of jpgs. Even nine-year-old girls ought to cry foul on this movie's endless blandness." Ronnie Scheib of Variety wrote: "In The Greatest (2009) and Country Strong (2010), Feste proved herself quite skilled, if not especially innovative, at limning her characters’ emotional travails. But subtlety, complexity and even the slightest modicum of realism elude her here." Stephanie Merry of The Washington Post said "The movie feels like Nicholas Sparks fan fiction."

Film historian Leonard Maltin gave the remake a more positive review than the original, giving it two out of a possible four stars (he gave its 1981 predecessor zero out of four, rating it a "BOMB"). Yet he described the newer film as "Mediocre ... This is sure to connect with its target audience -- and it's Oscarworthy compared to the 1981 version -- yet it remains overwrought and pointless for fans of the novel. Moreover, Lionel Richie's title tune (the only memorable aspect of the original) is sorely missed here."

In 2013, after reading the screenplay for the film, Scott Spencer - the author of the novel on which the film was based - wrote that "It's about one hundred pages, and the only ones that were not dreary were sciatica inducing". In 2014 he wrote that his novel "has been even more egregiously and ridiculously misunderstood" in making the remake than in the 1981 film.

== See also ==
- Endless Love (1981 film)
- Culture and menstruation
