= Last Known Position =

Thriller podcast and television series

- Genre: Mystery Thriller
- Created by: Lucas Passmore
- Based on: Last Known Position (podcast) by Lucas Passmore
- Starring: Gina Rodriguez
- Country of origin: United States
- Original language: English
- No. of seasons: 1

Production
- Executive producers: Gina Rodriguez; Lucas Passmore; Rob Herting; Sandra Yee Ling; Michele Zarate; Brian Kavanaugh-Jones; Fred Berger; Justin Levy; Jeremy Platt; Molly Breeskin
- Production companies: QCode; Automatik; I Can and Will Productions

Original release
- Network: Amazon Prime Video

Last Known Position is an American mystery thriller podcast, created by Lucas Passmore and starring Gina Rodriguez.

== Podcast ==
The podcast debuted in December 2021. The podcast was created during the COVID-19 pandemic. The podcast's cast included James Purefoy, Manny Jacinto, and Olivia Cheng. Gina Rodriguez stars in both the podcast and television series. Rodriguez plays a submarine pilot named Mikaela Soto. The podcast follows Soto and her crew as they search for the wreckage of a missing flight in the Pacific ocean. The podcast won best fiction podcast in the 2023 Ambies Awards and was nominated in two other categories.

=== Cast and characters ===
- Gina Rodriguez as Mikaela Soto
- James Purefoy as William Cavanaugh.
- Manny Jacinto
- Olivia Cheng
- Ashley Bell
- JR Bourne
- Travis Joe Dixon
- Dominic Bria
- Matthew Henerson
- Jessica Oyelowo
- Venk Potula
- Giovanna Quinto

== Television series ==
An adaptation of the work in the form of a television series is set to be released on Amazon Prime Video. The show is produced by QCode, Automatik, and I Can and Will, with Gina Rodriguez and Luke Passmore executive producing.
