= You're Not You =

- Theatrical release poster
- Directed by: George C. Wolfe
- Written by: Shana Feste; Jordan Roberts
- Based on: You're Not You by Michelle Wildgen
- Produced by: Alison Greenspan; Denise Di Novi; Hilary Swank; Molly Smith
- Starring: Hilary Swank; Emmy Rossum; Josh Duhamel
- Cinematography: Steven Fierberg
- Edited by: Jeffrey Wolf
- Music by: Jeanine Tesori
- Production companies: Daryl Prince Productions; Di Novi Pictures; 2S Films
- Distributed by: Entertainment One
- Release date: October 10, 2014
- Running time: 102 minutes
- Country: United States
- Language: English
- Box office: $894,964

You're Not You is a 2014 American drama film directed by George C. Wolfe and written by Shana Feste and Jordan Roberts, based on the 2006 novel by Michelle Wildgen. The film stars Hilary Swank, Emmy Rossum and Josh Duhamel.

The film was released on October 10, 2014 and received mixed reviews from critics.

== Plot ==
Kate Parker is a classical pianist who is diagnosed with ALS. Her husband Evan finds out one morning that Kate has fired her previous caregiver, Mrs. Trotter, and is looking for a replacement.

Bec Cartwell, a wild college student who parties a lot, applies for the job despite her lack of experience - apart from having volunteered at her grandmother's nursing home during her high school years. Kate sees something special in Bec despite her slightly vulgar language and poor housekeeping skills. Yet, despite all the mayhem Bec has caused at home, from messing up the kitchen by starting the blender without putting on the lid to dropping Kate in the bathroom, Kate maintains a calm and positive demeanor which confuses Bec.

One night, Kate has her friends over and finds out that Evan is having drinks instead of dinner, as he told her. Later that night, Kate convinces Bec to access Evan's laptop and they find out that Evan had an affair with his secretary, Cynthia. Distraught, Kate tells Bec to leave, however Bec comes rushing over to Kate's during a night out in a bar when she gets a text from her.

Bec finds Kate at the top of the stairs after a suicide attempt, where Kate had almost let herself fall down a flight of stairs. Kate then asks Bec to get her away from home. They end up staying the night.

In the morning Kate asks Bec to take her to an assisted living home, but refuses to leave her there. She is furious that she blames herself for ruining Evan's life with her ALS. Eventually, Kate splits up with Evan due to his brief affair, as well as her wanting not to be invisible after receiving a brief and angry pep talk by Bec.

Bec and Kate have a couple of adventures, including going to a club, meeting another couple where the wife Marilyn has ALS and trying "herbal therapy." They eventually go to a party for Kate's friend's daughter. Kate asks to hold the baby, but has a coughing fit and almost drops her.

While Bec is taking care of Kate inside, Evan appears so Kate has Bec tell him her true motivation for leaving, that it was a result of him making her feel invisible. The wife from the couple they met earlier has a complication due to her condition and is hospitalized. It scares Kate to see first-hand what eventually happens to all ALS patients.

Bec briefly talks to Kate's "best friends" who ask her to tell Kate that they love, miss and are there for her. Evan visits the house again, but Kate and Bec turn him away again. Bec's parents visit for Christmas and a conversation with her Mom, overheard by Kate, causes her to fire Bec as she believes her illness is ruining Bec's life just like it did with Evan.

Kate goes to her parents' house and attends a Christmas party with Evan, hinting that they are together again. Eventually, Bec receives news that Marilyn has died. She drops off a letter with Evan for Kate that Marilyn sent to some of her friends.

Kate becomes hospitalized shortly after and it is discovered that Bec was given medical authority over her. Even though Kate's mother begs her to put Kate on a ventilator, Bec refuses and instead takes her home with Evan. Bec helps Kate play her favorite Chopin piece on the piano again.

After Evan professes his love for her, Kate and Bec lie in bed, where Kate makes her promise not to call for help tonight and to find someone for herself who can see her. Bec agrees, on the condition that Kate promises to accept a compliment. So, Bec thanks her for the Manolos they shared, teaching her how to cook, and letting her experience this with Kate and not letting her mess up this job.

Kate dies that night and Bec, unable to stay in the other room, holds her while she takes her last breaths. The movie ends with Bec finally meeting with Will, a nice boy who has been pursuing her, and performing at the club without suffering from stage fright.

== Cast ==
- Hilary Swank as Kate Parker
- Emmy Rossum as Bec Cartwell
- Josh Duhamel as Evan Parker
- Stephanie Beatriz as Jill
- Jason Ritter as Will
- Julian McMahon as Liam
- Loretta Devine as Marilyn
- Ernie Hudson as John
- Ali Larter as Keely
- Andrea Savage as Alyssa
- Marcia Gay Harden as Elizabeth
- Frances Fisher as Gwen
- Geoff Pierson as Kate's Father
- Mike Doyle as Tom
- Beau Knapp as Jackson
- Erin Chenoweth as Cynthia
- Gareth Williams as Bruce
- Gerald Downey as Bill
- Ed Begley Jr. as Uncle Roger

== Release ==
The film was distributed in North America by Entertainment One Films and released on October 10, 2014, in limited release, grossing $11,486 from 5 screens. It was released on DVD on April 13, 2015.

== Reception ==
=== Box office ===
The film opened in Italy on August 27, 2015, debuting in fifth place with a total gross of $153,892 in its opening weekend. The film grossed $11,486 during its limited release, and $894,964 worldwide.

=== Critical response ===
On Rotten Tomatoes, the film holds an approval rating of 52% based on 21 reviews, with an average rating of 5.7/10. The site's critical consensus reads, "Despite the best efforts of its two talented female leads, You're Not You is not a consistently satisfying adaptation of its source material". On Metacritic, the film has a weighted average score of 56 out of 100, based on eight critics, indicating "mixed or average" reviews.
