= Hank the Cowdog (podcast) =

Children's podcast

Publication
- Provider: QCode

Related
- Website: qcodemedia.com/hank-the-cow-dog

Hank the Cowdog is a scripted podcast written and directed by Jeff Nichols and produced by QCode. The five episode series stars Matthew McConaughey. The show is an adaptation of the Hank the Cowdog story called "Lost in the Dark Unchanted Forest".

== Background ==
The podcast was written and directed by Jeff Nichols. The podcast was produced by QCode and stars Matthew McConaughey. The podcast debuted on September 14, 2020 and released a new episode every Monday until October 12, 2020. The podcast was nominated for an iHeartRadio Podcast Award in 2021 and was also nominated for an Ambies Award in 2021.

=== Cast and characters ===
- Matthew McConaughey as Hank
- Jesse Plemons as Drover
- Kirsten Dunst as Sally May
- John R. Erickson as Wallace the buzzard
- Scoot McNairy as Junior
- Michael Shannon as Sinister the Bobcat
- Joel Edgerton as Rip and Snort
- Leslie Jordan as Pete the Barn Cat
- Cynthia Erivo as Madame Moonshine
