= When Trumpets Fade =

1998 American television film by John Irvin

- Television poster
- Written by: W.W. Vought
- Directed by: John Irvin
- Starring: Ron Eldard; Frank Whaley; Zak Orth; Dylan Bruno
- Music by: Geoffrey Burgon
- Country of origin: United States
- Original language: English

Production
- Producer: John Kemeny
- Running time: 92 minutes
- Production company: HBO NYC Productions

Original release
- Network: HBO
- Release: June 27, 1998

When Trumpets Fade is a 1998 HBO television movie directed by John Irvin and starring Ron Eldard, Frank Whaley, Zak Orth, and Dylan Bruno. First released on June 27, 1998, the film is set in World War II during the Battle of the Hürtgen Forest.

== Plot ==
Private David Manning of the 28th Infantry Division survives the Battle of the Hürtgen Forest and unwillingly accepts a battlefield promotion to sergeant by his company commander, Captain Roy Pritchett. Attempts to be discharged under Section 8 as mentally unfit due to combat stress are fruitless, and Manning takes charge of a platoon of inexperienced replacement soldiers.

When Manning puts Private Warren Sanderson on point for a patrol, Sanderson gets separated from the squad and is scorned by his peers when he returns. Manning is berated by newly assigned First Lieutenant Terrence Lukas, and their company continues the advance toward the town of Schmidt and a key bridge. They are fired on in an enemy minefield and forced back. Pritchett asks Manning for volunteers to destroy enemy guns, and promises him a Section 8 if he accomplishes the mission.

During the mission, Private Sam Baxter flees in panic, starting a rout. Manning shoots Baxter, igniting the flamethrower on his back. Horrified by his fiery death, the men resume the attack and led by Sanderson succeed in destroying the guns, enabling Manning's company to attack the bridge. Suffering heavy casualties they secure the bridge but retreat in the face of a German tank counterattack. Lonnie is killed, Despin is captured, and Manning and Sanderson escape. Pritchett cracks under pressure and is ordered off the line before he can uphold his promise to Manning.

The battalion commander, Lieutenant Colonel George Rickman, asks the traumatized Lukas about the status of his platoon. Lukas snaps, assaults him, and is led away. Manning confronts Rickman with the blood-soaked dog tags Lukas dropped. Despite the insubordination, Rickman reluctantly promotes him to lieutenant to take command of Lukas' platoon.

Talbot and Corporal Toby Chamberlain confront Manning for shooting Baxter. In the ensuing altercation, Manning reveals a plan to destroy the German tanks the night before the assault. Chamberlain fears Manning will shoot them as he did Baxter but Sanderson defends Manning who explains the battalion could be wiped out during the next day's attack if they don't destroy the tanks.

Manning leads Talbot, Chamberlain, and Sanderson in a pre-dawn raid on the German tanks without the battalion's knowledge. They traverse a minefield and a barbed wire obstacle, and destroy the tanks with a bazooka. Only Sanderson and Manning, who is left severely wounded, survive the assault. While being carried back to friendly lines by Sanderson, Manning loses consciousness from his wounds. An epilogue states that after three months of heavy combat, the Battle of the Hürtgen Forest claimed more than 24,000 American casualties, with little justification for so great a sacrifice. The battle itself was overshadowed by the Battle of the Bulge soon afterward.

== Cast ==
- Ron Eldard as Private / Sergeant / Second Lieutenant David Manning, who progresses from greenie, to squad leader, to platoon leader in C Company
- Zak Orth as Private Warren "Sandy" Sanderson, a replacement in Manning's squad
- Frank Whaley as Corporal Toby Chamberlain, a medic attached to C Company
- Dylan Bruno as Sergeant Patrick Talbot, a squad leader in Lukas' platoon
- Devon Gummersall as Private Andrew Lonnie, a replacement in Manning's squad
- Dan Futterman as Private Doug Despin, a replacement in Manning's squad
- Steven Petrarca as Private Sam Baxter, a replacement in Manning's squad
- Dwight Yoakam as Lieutenant Colonel George Rickman, the battalion commander of First Battalion
- Martin Donovan as Captain Roy Pritchett, the company commander of C Company, First Battalion
- Timothy Olyphant as 1st Lieutenant Terrence Lukas, the leader of Manning and Talbot's platoon
- Jeffrey Donovan as Private Robert "Bobby" Miller, a fellow soldier of Manning's
- Bobby Cannavale as Captain Thomas Zenek, the new commander of C Company
- Frank-Michael Köbe as Oberfeldwebel, a German Army patrol leader

== Production ==
When Trumpets Fade was filmed on location in Budapest, Lake Balaton, Hungary, and in Calgary, Alberta, Canada. US troops supporting Operation Joint Guard, stationed in Taszar, Hungary, were used as extras on the set.

== Awards ==
John Irvin won the Silver FIPA Award for Best Director for the film at the Biarritz International Festival in 1999.

The film was also nominated for best cinematography (by Thomas Burstyn) by the American Society of Cinematographers and best sound editing by the Motion Picture Sound Editors . Ron Eldard was nominated for best actor at the Seattle International Film Festival.
