= List of awards and nominations received by Rami Malek =

Rami Malek awards and nominations
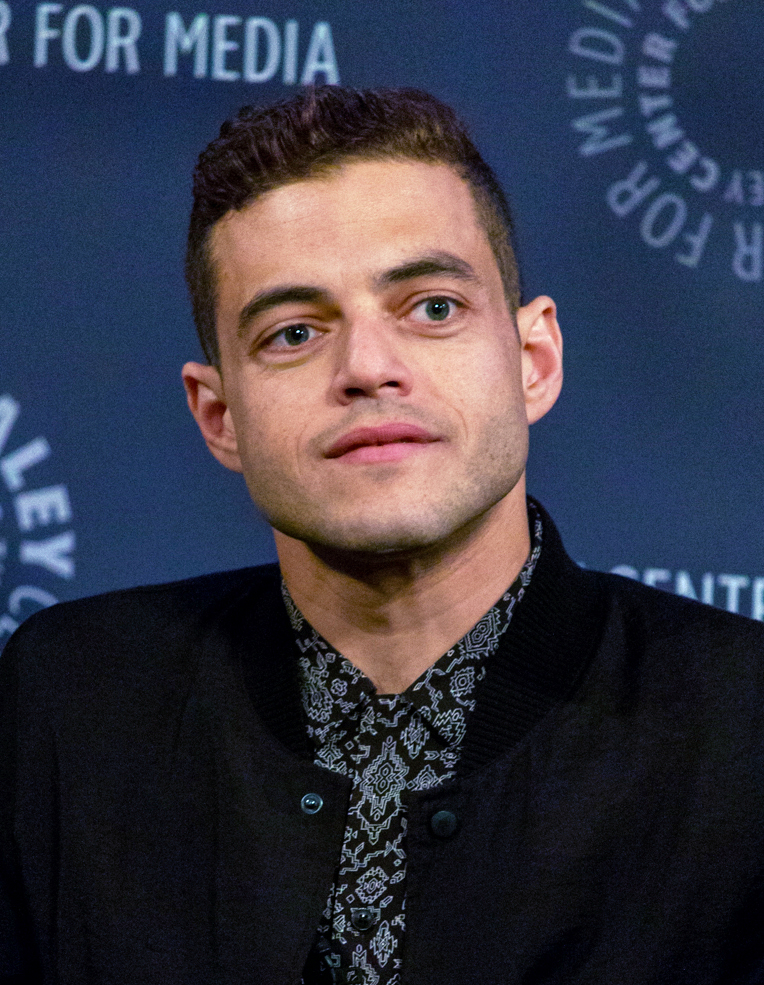
- Malek at the Paley Center for Media in 2015
Award	Wins	Nominations
AACTA International Awards	1	1
Academy Awards	1	1
Alliance of Women Film Journalists	1	1
Austin Film Critics Association	0	1
British Academy Film Awards	1	1
Chicago Film Critics Association	0	1
Critics' Choice Movie Awards	1	2
Critics' Choice Television Awards	1	2
Dallas–Fort Worth Film Critics Association	0	1
Detroit Film Critics Society	0	1
Dorian Awards	0	3
Georgia Film Critics Association	0	1
Gold Derby Awards	2	6
Golden Globe Awards	1	4
Houston Film Critics Society	0	1
IndieWire Critics Poll	0	1
Los Angeles Online Film Critics Society	1	1
MTV Movie & TV Awards	0	1
Palm Springs International Film Festival	1	1
People's Choice Awards	0	1
Primetime Emmy Awards	1	1
San Diego Film Critics Society	0	1
San Francisco Film Critics Circle	0	1
Satellite Awards	1	3
Santa Barbara International Film Festival	1	1
Screen Actors Guild Awards	2	5
Seattle Film Critics Society	0	1
St. Louis Film Critics Association	0	1
Television Critics Association	0	1
Washington D.C. Area Film Critics Association	0	1
Wins	15
Nominations	47

Rami Malek is an American actor known for his roles on stage and screen. He has received various accolades including an Academy Award, a BAFTA Award, a Golden Globe Award, an Emmy Award, an AACTA Award, two Critics' Choice Awards and two Screen Actors Guild Awards.

Malek earned acclaim for his breakout role as Elliot Alderson, a clinically depressed cybersecurity engineer and hacker on the USA Network thriller series Mr. Robot (2015–2019). For his performance, he won the Primetime Emmy Award for Outstanding Lead Actor in a Drama Series and Critics' Choice Television Award for Best Actor in a Drama Series (both in 2016) as well as nominations for three Golden Globe Awards for Best Actor – Television Series Drama and two Screen Actors Guild Awards for Outstanding Performance by a Male Actor in a Drama Series.

His portrayal of Freddie Mercury in Bohemian Rhapsody (2018) won him the Academy Award for Best Actor, BAFTA Award for Best Actor in a Leading Role, Golden Globe Award for Best Actor – Motion Picture Drama, and Screen Actors Guild Award for Outstanding Performance by a Male Actor in a Leading Role. He was also nominated for the Critics' Choice Movie Award for Best Actor. The film was nominated for the Academy Award for Best Picture and won the Golden Globe Award for Best Motion Picture – Drama, and became a massive box-office success, grossing over $900 million worldwide on a production budget of about $50 million, becoming the sixth-highest-grossing film of 2018 and the highest-grossing musical biographical film of all time, as well as one of 20th Century Fox's top ten highest-grossing films.

Malek took a supporting role as David L. Hill, a nuclear physicist in the Christopher Nolan directed biographical historical epic Oppenheimer (2023). He won alongside the ensemble, which included Cillian Murphy, Robert Downey Jr., Emily Blunt, Matt Damon, Florence Pugh, and Kenneth Branagh for the Screen Actors Guild Award for Outstanding Performance by a Cast in a Motion Picture.

== Major associations ==
=== Academy Awards ===
Year	Category	Nominated work	Result	Ref.
2018	Best Actor	Bohemian Rhapsody	Won	

=== BAFTA Awards ===
Year	Category	Nominated work	Result	Ref.
2018	Best Film Actor in a Leading Role	Bohemian Rhapsody	Won	

=== Critics' Choice Awards ===
Year	Category	Nominated work	Result	Ref.
Critics' Choice Movie Awards
2018	Best Actor	Bohemian Rhapsody	Nominated	
2024	Best Cast	Oppenheimer	Won	
Critics' Choice Television Awards
2015	Best Actor in a Drama Series	Mr. Robot (season one)	Won	
2016	Best Actor in a Drama Series	Mr. Robot (season two)	Nominated	

=== Emmy Awards ===
Year	Category	Nominated work	Result	Ref.
Primetime Emmy Awards
2016	Outstanding Lead Actor in a Drama Series	Mr. Robot (episode: "eps1.0_hellofriend.mov")	Won	

=== Golden Globe Awards ===
Year	Category	Nominated work	Result	Ref.
2015	Best Actor in a Television Series – Drama	Mr. Robot (season one)	Nominated	
2016	Best Actor in a Television Series – Drama	Mr. Robot (season two)	Nominated	
2018	Best Actor in a Motion Picture – Drama	Bohemian Rhapsody	Won	
2019	Best Actor in a Television Series – Drama	Mr. Robot (season four)	Nominated	

=== Screen Actors Guild Awards ===
Year	Category	Nominated work	Result	Ref.
2015	Outstanding Actor in a Drama Series	Mr. Robot (season one)	Nominated	
2016	Outstanding Actor in a Drama Series	Mr. Robot (season two)	Nominated	
2018	Outstanding Actor in a Leading Role	Bohemian Rhapsody	Won	
2018	Outstanding Ensemble in a Motion Picture	Bohemian Rhapsody	Nominated	
2023	Outstanding Cast in a Motion Picture	Oppenheimer	Won	

== Miscellaneous associations ==
Organizations	Year	Category	Work	Result	Ref.
AACTA Awards	2019	Best Actor	Bohemian Rhapsody	Won	
Capri Hollywood International Film Festival	2023	Best Ensemble Cast	Oppenheimer	Won	
Dorian Awards	2016	TV Performance of the Year – Actor	Mr. Robot	Nominated	
Dorian Awards	2016	"We're Wilde About You!" Rising Star Award	Mr. Robot	Nominated	
Dorian Awards	2019	Film Performance of the Year – Actor	Bohemian Rhapsody	Nominated	
MTV Movie & TV Awards	2019	Best Performance	Bohemian Rhapsody	Nominated	
Palm Springs International Film Festival	2019	Breakthrough Performance Award	Bohemian Rhapsody	Won	
People's Choice Awards	2017	Favorite Cable TV Actor	—N/a	Nominated	
Santa Barbara International Film Festival	2019	Outstanding Performance of the Year	Bohemian Rhapsody	Won	
Satellite Awards	2016	Best Actor in a Television Series – Drama	Mr. Robot	Nominated	
Satellite Awards	2017	Best Actor in a Television Series – Drama	Mr. Robot	Nominated	
Satellite Awards	2019	Best Actor in a Motion Picture – Musical or Comedy	Bohemian Rhapsody	Won	

== Critics awards ==
Organizations	Year	Category	Work	Result	Ref.
Alliance of Women Film Journalists	2019	Best Actor	Bohemian Rhapsody	Nominated	
Austin Film Critics Association,	2019	Best Actor	Bohemian Rhapsody	Nominated	
Chicago Film Critics Association	2018	Best Actor	Bohemian Rhapsody	Nominated	
Dallas–Fort Worth Film Critics Association	2018	Best Actor	Bohemian Rhapsody	Nominated	
Detroit Film Critics Society	2018	Best Actor	Bohemian Rhapsody	Nominated	
Georgia Film Critics Association	2018	Best Actor	Bohemian Rhapsody	Nominated	
Houston Film Critics Society	2018	Best Actor	Bohemian Rhapsody	Nominated	
IndieWire Critics Poll	2018	Best Actor	Bohemian Rhapsody	4th place	
Los Angeles Online Film Critics Society	2019	Best Actor	Bohemian Rhapsody	Won	
San Diego Film Critics Society	2018	Best Breakout Artist	Bohemian Rhapsody	Nominated	
San Francisco Bay Area Film Critics Circle	2018	Best Actor	Bohemian Rhapsody	Nominated	
Seattle Film Critics Society	2018	Best Actor	Bohemian Rhapsody	Nominated	
St. Louis Film Critics Association	2018	Best Actor	Bohemian Rhapsody	Nominated	
Television Critics Association	2016	Individual Achievement in Drama	Mr. Robot	Nominated	
Washington D.C. Area Film Critics Association	2018	Best Actor	Bohemian Rhapsody	Nominated	
