= Run Sweetheart Run =

2020 film by Shana Feste

- Release poster
- Directed by: Shana Feste
- Written by: Shana Feste; Keith Josef Adkins; Kellee Terrell
- Produced by: Jason Blum; Effie T. Brown; Shana Feste; Brian Kavanaugh-Jones
- Starring: Ella Balinska; Pilou Asbæk; Dayo Okeniyi; Betsy Brandt; Ava Grey; Lamar Johnson; Jess Gabor; Clark Gregg; Shohreh Aghdashloo
- Cinematography: Bartosz Nalazek
- Edited by: Dominic LaPerriere
- Music by: Rob
- Production companies: Blumhouse Productions; Automatik Entertainment; Quiet Girl Productions; Gamechanger Films
- Distributed by: Amazon Studios
- Release dates: January 27, 2020 (Sundance); October 28, 2022 (Amazon Prime Video)
- Running time: 104 minutes
- Country: United States
- Language: English

Run Sweetheart Run is a 2020 American supernatural horror film directed by Shana Feste from a screenplay by Feste, Keith Josef Adkins and Kellee Terrell. The film stars Ella Balinska, Pilou Asbæk, Dayo Okeniyi, Betsy Brandt, Ava Grey, Lamar Johnson, Jess Gabor, Clark Gregg, and Shohreh Aghdashloo. It follows Cherie (Balinska), a single mother who is set up on a blind date by her boss with a wealthy client, Ethan (Asbæk). After an initially charming dinner, Ethan reveals himself to be a supernatural, bloodthirsty monster who hunts her through Los Angeles in a relentless, night-long game of survival.

Run Sweetheart Run had its world premiere at the Sundance Film Festival on January 27, 2020, and was released on Amazon Prime Video on October 28, 2022, by Amazon Studios. The film received mixed reviews from critics.

== Plot ==
Cherie is a young single mother and pre-law student working as a secretary for a legal firm in Los Angeles. On her way home, her boss James calls her saying that she double-booked him and asking her to attend a dinner with an important client in his place; she reluctantly accepts. While preparing for the dinner, Cherie's period starts and she realizes she is out of tampons.

At the dinner, Cherie is charmed by the client, Ethan, although he suddenly becomes irritated when approached by a dog, explaining that he was bitten by one as a child. Ethan invites Cherie to spend the night with him, which she accepts. He sets an alarm on his phone for the early morning so she can return home before her daughter awakens. As he does so, she notices that he already has an alarm for 5:25 AM. When they enter his house, Ethan attacks Cherie, who flees into the streets while shouting for help.

Cherie eventually finds two women outside a movie theater and convinces them to call 911. The police arrest Cherie for public intoxication, despite her protestations that she was attacked. Cherie talks to another woman in the cell who panics when Cherie describes Ethan. The woman warns Cherie that Ethan "controls men" and urges her to seek the "First Lady". The police escort Ethan into Cherie's cell, where he declares that he will hunt her through the night, but promises to let her go if she survives until morning.

Upon her release, Cherie finds shelter in James' apartment. She searches for information about Ethan on James' computer and finds that she is the latest in a long string of women marked as tithes for Ethan. James' wife, Judy, warns Cherie that Ethan can smell her blood and that she should clean herself thoroughly. Cherie flees on a bus and calls her ex-boyfriend Trey for help.

While stopping at a gas station to buy tampons, Cherie is ambushed by Ethan. She strikes him in the head and escapes with the help of Trey, who drives her to his place. Dawn, Trey's current girlfriend and Cherie's former best friend, is unexpectedly sympathetic toward Cherie. When Ethan arrives looking for Cherie, Dawn and her friends arm themselves to fight him off, but he effortlessly kills them, before decapitating Trey in front of Cherie.

Remembering Judy's advice, Cherie throws some of her menstrual blood onto a passing car to mislead Ethan. She flees to a church and asks a priest for holy water and a crucifix. However, she discovers the priest unconscious and realizes that Ethan had assumed his form. Ethan then reveals his true monstrous form to Cherie. Returning to human form, Ethan is attacked by the priest, allowing Cherie to escape.

Arriving at an underground rave, Cherie calls the number on a flyer for the First Lady, obtaining the location for a nearby spa. When Cherie is accosted by a man, she is rescued by a group of party girls. As they leave the rave, Cherie realizes that Ethan's alarm was set for sunrise. Ethan then kills the party girls and attacks Cherie until a pit bull intervenes, barking at Ethan and scaring him off.

At the spa, Cherie discovers the "First Lady", Dinah, and a group of women practicing martial arts. Dinah explains that Ethan is a fallen angel whose job was to protect and guide humanity. Instead, Ethan decided to use his prodigious powers to promote male dominance throughout history. Dinah says she needs to use Cherie as bait to lure Ethan out so he can be defeated.

Cherie drives to the Santa Monica Pier and reopens her wounds, attracting Ethan. As Ethan prepares to kill Cherie, his alarm rings and he realizes that the dawn has arrived. Cherie throws a rock through a blacked-out window, exposing Ethan to the sunlight and incapacitating him. The women from the spa, who have gathered outside, throw more rocks through the windows, flooding the room with sunlight and fatally weakening Ethan. Outside, Cherie mocks the now-weakened Ethan as his power dies. Dinah lights Ethan on fire, killing him. Cherie ultimately returns home to her daughter.

== Cast ==
- Ella Balinska as Cherie
- Pilou Asbæk as Ethan
- Dayo Okeniyi as Trey
- Betsy Brandt as Judy
- Ava Grey as Anita
- Lamar Johnson as Norlon
- Jess Gabor as Maia
- Clark Gregg as James R. Fuller
- Shohreh Aghdashloo as First Lady Dinah

== Production ==
=== Development ===
In June 2018, it was announced Shana Feste would direct the film, from a screenplay she wrote alongside Keith Josef Adkins and Kellee Terrell. Jason Blum, Brian Kavanaugh-Jones, and Feste will serve as producers on the film, under their Blumhouse Productions, Automatik and Quiet Girl Productions banners, respectively.

=== Casting ===
In February 2019, Ella Balinska, Pilou Asbaek, Clark Gregg, Dayo Okeniyi, Betsy Brandt and Shohreh Aghdashloo joined the cast of the film. Feste based the film on her real-life experiences of being a victim of a traumatizing date and sexual assault.

=== Filming ===
Principal photography began in Los Angeles in February 2019.

== Release ==
Run Sweetheart Run had its world premiere at the Sundance Film Festival on January 27, 2020. It was also scheduled to screen at South by Southwest on March 13, 2020, but the festival was canceled due to the COVID-19 pandemic. It was scheduled to be released theatrically by Blumhouse Tilt and OTL Releasing on May 8, 2020, but it was pulled from the schedule due to movie theater closures because of the pandemic restrictions. In May 2020, Amazon Studios acquired distribution rights to the film, and released it digitally on Amazon Prime Video on October 28, 2022.

== Reception ==
On the review aggregator website Rotten Tomatoes, 62% of 53 critics' reviews are positive, with an average rating of 5.7/10. The website's consensus reads: "Run Sweetheart Run's heavy-handedness blunts the effectiveness of its message, but this remains a wily, unpredictable thriller." Metacritic, which uses a weighted average, gave the film a score of 51 out of 100 based on 14 critic reviews, indicating "mixed or average" reviews.
