= Carrier (podcast) =

Science fiction podcast

Carrier is a podcast produced by QCode and starring Cynthia Erivo. The show is being adapted into a movie.

== Background ==
The podcast was produced by QCode. The podcast was QCode's follow up to their first show Blackout. The podcast stars Cynthia Erivo. The podcast was released in 2019. The podcast was seven episodes long. The show is a serialized audio drama. The show uses binaural audio. The audio contains traffic noises that could make it dangerous to listen to while driving a vehicle. The show follows an African-American truck driver named Raylene Watts. The podcast is being adapted into a movie. The film will be produced by Amblin Entertainment. Dan Blank worked on both the podcast and the film. Erivo will star in the film adaption of the podcast as well. The podcast received a rating of 6.7 out of 10 on IMDb.
