= Toby Sedgwick =

British movement director

- Born: 16 August 1958 (age 68); England
- Occupations: Movement director, actor, theatre choreographer
- Years active: 1981–present
- Known for: War Horse; The 39 Steps

Toby Sedgwick (born 16 August 1958) is a British movement director, actor and theatre choreographer. He is best known for devising the "horse choreography" for the life-size puppets in War Horse (2007). The production played at the New London Theatre in the West End, the Vivian Beaumont Theater on Broadway, and Toronto's Princess of Wales Theatre. The work earned Sedgwick the 2008 Laurence Olivier Award for Best Theatre Choreographer and the 2012 Dora Mavor Moore Award for Outstanding Choreography in a Play or Musical.

== Early life and training ==
Sedgwick was born in England in 1958 and attended Bryanston School in Dorset. He trained on the drama course at Arts Educational. He later studied for two years at L'École Internationale de Théâtre Jacques Lecoq in Paris. He co-founded The Moving Picture Mime Show in London.

== Career ==
=== Early work and subsequent career ===
Sedgwick made his directorial debut with Pidgin Macbeth (1998) at the National Theatre in London. In 2006, he choreographed Hergé's Adventures of Tintin at the Playhouse Theatre and Dick Whittington and His Cat at the Barbican. He also directed a Manchester production of The Taming of the Shrew.

Among Sedgwick's early major credits was co-direction for The 39 Steps at the Criterion Theatre in the West End in 2006. His acting credits include Earfull at the Battersea Arts Centre in 2007. Other credits include The Tempest (2007), His Dark Materials (2009), and Looking for Yoghurt (2009). Sedgwick played the Professor, the character associated with Harpo Marx, in the 1999 West End production of Animal Crackers at the Lyric Theatre.

Sedgwick has served as movement director for British productions of The Nativity, Cinderella, King Lear, The Government Inspector, Marat/Sade, and Rosencrantz and Guildenstern Are Dead.

=== Other work ===
Sedgwick's work subsequently reached New York through the Broadway transfer of War Horse and his movement direction for The 39 Steps, produced by the Roundabout Theatre Company beginning in 2008. Billed as Alfred Hitchcock's The 39 Steps, it opened at the American Airlines Theatre on Broadway before transferring to the Cort Theatre and later the Helen Hayes Theatre for an extended run.

Sedgwick assisted Danny Boyle with the choreography for the London 2012 Olympic Games opening ceremony.

=== Film and television ===
Sedgwick's screen work has combined acting with movement direction. His acting roles include an infected priest in 28 Days Later (2002), Black Brother in Shrooms (2007), and an enemy pilot in Nanny McPhee and the Big Bang (2010). As a movement director and choreographer, he collaborated with Danny Boyle on 28 Days Later and the television series Pistol.
