= Borrasca (podcast) =

Narrative horror podcast

- Genre: Horror
- Format: Audio drama Podcast
- Language: English

Creative team
- Created by: Rebecca Klingel
- Written by: Rebecca Klingel
- Directed by: Stefanie Abel Horowitz; Tess Harrison

Cast and voices
- Starring: Cole Sprouse

Music
- Composed by: Darren Johnson

Production
- Production: Rob Herting; Dave Henning; Brian Kavanaugh-Jones; Fred Berger; Cole Sprouse; Tess Ryan

Publication
- No. of seasons: 2
- No. of episodes: 16
- Original release: May 25, 2020 – November 10, 2022
- Provider: QCODE

Borrasca is a horror audio drama and podcast series written by Rebecca Klingel and based on her short stories of the same name, which she published on Reddit under the pen name C.K. Walker in 2015 and 2016. The series stars Cole Sprouse and is produced by QCODE. The first season ran from May 25 to July 14, 2020, while the second season ran from October 6 to November 10, 2022.

== Premise ==
At age 12, Sam moves with his family to the former mining town of Drisking, Missouri. He befriends two local kids named Kyle and Kimber, who help him get used to bizarre things that are treated as usual by the townspeople—strangest of all is the occasional loud grinding noise in the distance which supposedly emanates from Borrasca, described only as "a place where bad things happen". When Sam's sister Whitney disappears a few months later, five years pass without answers until more people suddenly start disappearing. Sam, Kyle, and Kimber investigate why so many residents have disappeared over the years, why the remaining townspeople seem not to care, and how the disappearances appear to be connected to the abandoned mines on a nearby mountain.

== Production ==
"Borrasca" was originally released as a four-part short story on the Reddit page r/nosleep in 2015, and Klingel expanded the story with a fifth part in 2016. "Borrasca" won r/nosleep's awards for both Best Series and Scariest Story in 2015. After the story went viral, filmmaker Mike Flanagan hired Klingel to join the writing team for his Netflix horror series The Haunting of Hill House, The Haunting of Bly Manor, and The Fall of the House of Usher.

The podcast series was originally released on Spotify, Apple Podcasts, Stitcher, and YouTube, and was later also released on other platforms.

== Cast and characters ==
- Cole Sprouse as Sam Walker
  - Charlie Shotwell as Young Sam Walker
- Daniel Webber as Kyle Landy
  - Zackary Arthur as Young Kyle Landy
- Sarah Yarkin as Kimber Destaro
  - Lulu Wilson as Young Kimber Destaro
- Lisa Edelstein as Leah Dixon
- Peyton Kennedy as Whitney Walker
- Jama Williamson as Lisbeth Walker
- Mark Derwin as Graham Walker
- Dan Blank as Ken Landy
- Carmen Tonarelli as Anne Landy
- Carolyn P. Riggs as Megan Destaro
- Roger Howarth as Peter Destaro
- Caroline Newton as Krista Portnick / Lily Walstein
- Aidan McGraw as Young Parker Landy / Wes Litszick
- Beau Knapp as Erik Tucker
- Richard Burgi as Killian Clery
- James Wellington as Mr. Diamond / Tom Prescott
- Jules Giselle as Phoebe Dranger
- Ella Anderson as Paige Berry
- Hynden Walch as Young Kristy Nanbelt / Woman #5
- Jack McGraw as Kaiden Whitiger
- Louise Lombard as Mrs. Tverdy / Woman in White
- Rebecca Field as Kathryn Scanlon
- Sean Maguire as Jimmy Prescott
- Debbe Hirata as Grace Clery
- Cara Santana as Meera Daley
- Michael Deery as Phil Saunders
  - Christian Isaiah as Young Phil Saunders
- Aramis Knight as Mike Sutton
  - Rhys Alterman as Young Mike Sutton
- Seychelle Gabriel as Emmaline Bonham
- Sam Jaeger as Owen Daley
- Violet McGraw as Wyatt Litzick
- Kristen Tepper as Amanda Litzick
- Mace Coronel as Parker Landy / Boyfriend / Burnout
- Julia Henning as Kristy Nanbelt / Woman #2 / Nurse #1
- Dylan Bruno as Kevin Vanderveld
- Staysha Holcombe as Receptionist
- Carlo Rota as Pastor / Officer Jameson
- Nick Sagar as Officer Ramirez
- Gary Galone as Deputy #1
- Mara Shuster-Lefkowitz as Woman #1
- Sheila Carrasco as Nurse #2
- Dominic Bria as Police Officer #3

== Episodes ==
=== Season 1 (2020) ===
No.	Title	Original release date
1	"Tell Me About Whitney"	May 25, 2020
Sam Walker, a parolee, begins to tell his parole officer about a series of events that occurred during his childhood, beginning with his family's move to the town of Drisking, Missouri. The following events occur as a flashback. After the Walker family moves to Drisking when Sam is twelve, Sam befriends some other children from his neighborhood. While hanging out with his new friends, Sam experiences a mysterious phenomenon called "The Scream", and starts to uncover some strange urban legends surrounding the town of Drisking, all of which involve a place called Borrasca, described only as "a place where bad things happen."
2	"The Woods Are Full"	June 1, 2020
Sam starts school at Drisking Middle. Later that winter, Sam and Whitney fight when he tells his dad that Whitney has a new boyfriend. Sam learns about the history of the town's mining industry during a school assembly. Soon afterwards, Whitney goes missing, and Sam gets lost on the mountain that night while looking for her. Sam's parole officer urges him to talk about what happened to Whitney; she believes that something he witnessed when he was 17 is the core issue driving his addiction. Sam's roommate, Erik, tells him that a girl came looking for him earlier that day.
3	"Partial Remains"	June 8, 2020
Sam, now 17 and in his senior year of high school, spends most of his time either hanging out with Kyle and Kimber or working at a sandwich shop owned by Jimmy Prescott. During work, he witnesses a strange personal conversation between his boss and her husband. Kyle and Kimber are now dating, but Kimber's mom dislikes Kyle, and she wants Kimber to spend more time with her, which puts stress on their relationship. Sam has an argument with his father about Whitney. After being invited by the girl he has a crush on, Sam plans to attend his first ever Borrasca party, and he insists on bringing Kyle. In the present day, Erik urges Sam to get clean and deal with his problems, and tells Sam that the same girl came to their door looking for him again.
4	"The Million Dollar Question"	June 15, 2020
At a Borrasca Party, Kimber is taken into the forest by the Women in White, echoing Whitney’s experience before her disappearance. Sam and Kyle follow and witness a strange ceremony where Kimber’s blood is sampled. Kimber suspects Jimmy Prescott was involved. They visit Tom Prescott at the hospice, where he angrily defends his town. Kimber’s dad calls with news that her mom is in the hospital, and on the way there, Sam, Kimber, and Kyle are in a car accident.
5	"That's Not What You Told Me"	June 22, 2020
Sam wakes up in the hospital and learns Kimber's mom committed suicide, while his dad offers him Whitney's car, contradicting the theory she ran away. Kimber plans to search her dad's study for a suspected suicide note. In the present, Sam reflects on missing a crucial name carved into a tree that might have changed events and struggles with the prospect of finding a job due to his ex-con status, contemplating returning to prison to secure steady employment and address his heroin addiction.
6	"All Her Shame on Display"	June 29, 2020
Sam and Kyle argue with Kimber's dad at her mom's funeral. Sam gives Kimber his car and house keys, but she leaves to search for her mom's suicide note. After the burial, deputies visit Kimber's dad, who ends up crying, and Kimber and her father later disappear. Sam and Kyle find their home empty, with a deputy claiming they went to California. In the present, Sam tells Ms. Dixon he believes Kimber didn’t go to California because her name was carved into the Triple Tree.
7	"Mile Marker 54"	July 6, 2020
Sam and Kyle make up after a fight and start searching for Kimber, discovering her name carved into the Triple Tree and finding unsettling graffiti and mile markers. Sam declines Emmaline's invitation, leading to their breakup. They find eight mile markers in total, with the final one, mile marker 54, suggesting a tally of victims rather than distance. They encounter hostile officers and retired sheriff Clery, which leads to a confrontation. Sam and Kyle plan to resume their search for Kimber the next morning.
8	"The Place Where Bad Things Happen Pt. I"	July 13, 2020
At a Borrasca party, Kyle fights with Phil Saunders and reveals his suicidal thoughts to Sam. They seek help from Kathryn at the historical society, learning that "borrasca" refers to a defunct mine. Kyle finds documents on mine closures and, with Kathryn’s map, they set out to locate the oldest mine. They encounter Meera, who reveals she's pregnant despite earlier claims of infertility, and she warns them against searching for Borrasca. Sam decides to quit and, at Ambercot Fort, finds Kyle's name and Whitney's mile marker—a dollhouse made by his dad—which leads him to suspect his father’s involvement in Whitney's disappearance.
9	"The Place Where Bad Things Happen Pt. II"	July 14, 2020
Sam and Kyle uncover the horrific truth about Borrasca and the Shiny Gentleman. They find Kimber and plan to return to rescue other victims, but Sam stays behind to help Whitney, who is unresponsive. Jimmy Prescott reveals the town’s dark history, and while Kimber escapes, Kyle is dragged back by deputies, beaten, and Sam is framed for the assault. Sam flees to a hotel and leaves town after Kyle’s release. In the present, Sam shows Ms. Dixon a letter from Kimber, who then contacts the FBI to investigate Borrasca. Kimber, who has been searching for Sam, finally meets him at his apartment.

=== Season 2 (2022) ===
No.	Title	Original release date
1	"Welcome Home"	October 6, 2022
2	"The Gates of Borrasca"	October 13, 2022
3	"Kyle's Map Theory"	October 20, 2022
4	"An Unlikely Tomb"	October 27, 2022
5	"All Roads Lead to Borrasca"	November 3, 2022
6	"A Glorious Footnote Pt. I"	November 10, 2022
7	"A Glorious Footnote Pt. II"	November 10, 2022

== Reception ==
=== Awards ===
Year	Award	Category	Recipient	Result	Ref.
2020	Discover Pods Awards	Audio Drama or Fiction Podcast	Borrasca	Nominated	
2021	Webby Award	Podcasts: Scripted (Fiction)	Borrasca	Won	
2021	iHeart Podcast Awards	Best Fiction Podcast	Borrasca	Nominated	
2023	The Ambies	Best Performance in Audio Fiction	Cole Sprouse and Sarah Yarkin	Won	
