= Edith! =

Historical fiction podcast about Edith Wilson

Edith! is a historical fiction podcast written and created by Gonzalo Cordova and Travis Helwig, produced by QCode and Crooked Media starring Rosamund Pike about Edith Wilson. It was directed by Maureen Bharoocha.

== Background ==
The podcast is a collaboration between QCode and Crooked Media. The podcast takes place soon after the Treaty of Versailles and the Spanish flu when Woodrow Wilson fell ill while working to establish the League of Nations. The podcast follows Edith Wilson who took over much of her husband's responsibilities while he was struggling with his health. Rosamund Pike stars as Edith Wilson in the podcast. Other voice actors included Clark Gregg, Adam Conover, Esther Povitsky, Brandon Scott Jones, Chris Mulkey, Diedrich Bader, Tom Amandes, and Stephen Root. The story is based on historical events, but the show is a dramatization of the events and does not aim for historical accuracy which is evident by the subtitle—"The Untold True-ish Story of America's Secret First Female President". The podcast was an eight episode series.

== Reception ==
Nicholas Quah wrote in Vulture that the podcast is "too eagerly and cavalierly clever for its own good". Ammar Kalia wrote in The Guardian that the podcast "is a wry take on the historical machinations of power." Podcast Review, a channel of Los Angeles Review of Books, called the podcast "Quirky, stylish, and probably historically inaccurate". Patricia Nicol praised Pike's acting in The Times saying that she "is superb as the snarky, steely, manoeuvring Edith, always two steps ahead of the men"

=== Awards ===
Award	Date	Category	Result	Ref.
Adweek Awards	2021	Best Storytelling Podcast	Won	
Ambies	2022	Best Performer in Audio Fiction	Won	
Webby Awards	2022	Scripted Fiction Podcasts	Honoree	
