= Polly Bennett (movement director) =

British movement director and choreographer

Polly Bennett is a British director, movement director and choreographer. She is known for her work on screen performances, including those of Rami Malek in Bohemian Rhapsody, Austin Butler in Elvis and Timothée Chalamet in A Complete Unknown. Her other projects include The Crown and Saltburn.

Bennett founded Equity's Choreographers and Movement Directors Network (CMDN) in 2023 and has served as chair of its steering group. She is also a member of Equity's Dance Committee.

== Career ==
Bennett began as a dancer and actor before working behind the scenes in television production. She later pursued a master's degree in movement and joined the choreography team for the 2012 Summer Olympics ceremonies. She developed her practice in theatre before moving into film and television work.

In 2018, Bennett worked as an assistant choreographer on the film Stan & Ollie. Bennett was the movement director for the 2018 biographical film Bohemian Rhapsody, coaching Rami Malek in his portrayal of Freddie Mercury. Bennett was brought in for the film's Live Aid sequence, using Mercury's background in boxing, golf and long-distance running to inform Malek's body language. For the role, Bennett researched the reasons behind Mercury's movement and worked with Malek to make the physical performance appear spontaneous rather than choreographed.

She later worked as movement coach on the film Elvis, coaching Austin Butler in his portrayal of Elvis Presley. Bennett also worked with Naomi Ackie on her portrayal of Whitney Houston in the 2022 film Whitney Houston: I Wanna Dance with Somebody.

In 2023, Bennett choreographed the final dance sequence in Saltburn, working with Barry Keoghan on movement that reflected his character's growing sense of ownership over the estate. Bennett also worked as movement coach on the sixth season of The Crown, working with the young actors portraying Prince William and Prince Harry and using physical details from archival footage to inform their performances.

For the 2024 film A Complete Unknown, Bennett worked as movement coach with Timothée Chalamet on his portrayal of Bob Dylan; Chalamet later said their collaboration focused more on working through the script than on physicality.

By September 2025, Equity's Choreographers and Movement Directors Network had more than 200 members and had organised a national action day addressing working conditions, contracts and professional recognition. In 2026, the network campaigned for movement directors and choreographers to receive dedicated recognition in major theatre awards.

== Approach and recognition ==
Bennett has described her approach to movement direction as finding physical references that connect with a performer's existing experiences. Early in her career, while working as a production assistant on a television commercial, she helped a model struggling to walk in time to music by relating the movement to horse riding, an activity familiar to the performer.

For Elvis, Bennett worked with Austin Butler for a year and a half, on and off, developing his physical portrayal of Elvis Presley.

Rami Malek thanked Bennett in his speech after winning Breakthrough Performance at the Palm Springs International Film Festival.

Austin Butler thanked her in his speech after winning a BAFTA for Lead Actor in 2023.
