= Blackout (podcast) =

Apocalyptic thriller podcast by Qcode

- Season 2 cover art featuring Malek and King
- Genre: Apocalyptic thriller
- Format: Fiction
- Country of origin: United States
- Language: English

Creative team
- Created by: Scott Conroy
- Written by: Scott Conroy (season 1); Nina Baker (season 1); Katrina Albright (season 1); Jeremy Novick (season 2)
- Directed by: Shawn Christensen (season 1); Stefanie Abel Horowitz (season 2); Jeremy Novick (season 2)

Cast and voices
- Starring: Rami Malek; Aja Naomi King (season 2)

Music
- Composed by: Noah Gersh (season 1); Jamie Schefman (season 1); Jasper van Dyck (season 2)

Production
- Production: Rami Malek; Scott Conroy; Rob Herting
- Length: 24-49 minutes

Publication
- No. of seasons: 2
- No. of episodes: 16
- Original release: March 19, 2019 – present
- Provider: QCode

Blackout is an American apocalyptic thriller podcast drama series created by Scott Conroy, produced by QCode and Endeavor Audio and starring Rami Malek and Aja Naomi King.

The show's first season premiered on March 19, 2019. Two seasons have since been released.

== Premise ==
A sudden blackout leaves civilization in a state of unrest, and Simon Itani (Malek), a radio DJ, tries as best he can to protect his family and community through the desolate landscape in their hometown of Berlin in New England.

== Cast and characters ==
=== Main ===
- Rami Malek as Simon Itani (season 1-present)
- T. C. Carter as Hunter Itani (season 1-present)
- Aja Naomi King as Wren Foster (season 2-present)

== Background ==
Blackout was the first podcast produced and released by QCode.

The podcast was produced by QCode and Endeavor Audio. Blackout was the first podcast produced by QCode. The podcast was written by Scott Conroy. The podcast debuted on March 19, 2019. The first season of the podcast contains eight episodes. The second season stars Rami Malek and Aja Naomi King. The podcast was sponsored by Sonos. The story is set in a New England town called Berlin. The show follows a radio DJ named Simon Itani. The series explores what it would be like if modern technology was rendered useless. The show is an apocalyptic thriller. The A.V. Club called Rami's acting the "Best Celebrity Voice Work" in a 2019 podcast.

== Episodes ==
=== Season 1 (2019) ===
No. overall	No. in season	Title	Original release date
1	1	"Pilot"	March 19, 2019
2	2	"Dead Air"	March 19, 2019
3	3	"Slow Boil"	March 26, 2019
4	4	"Safe Space"	April 2, 2019
5	5	"Normal"	April 9, 2019
6	6	"The Trial"	April 16, 2019
7	7	"Animals"	April 23, 2019
8	8	"Whiteout"	April 30, 2019

=== Season 2 (2021) ===
No. overall	No. in season	Title	Original release date
9	1	"Powder Keg"	June 5, 2021
10	2	"Control"	June 5, 2021
11	3	"Safe"	June 10, 2021
12	4	"Sick"	June 17, 2021
13	5	"Chores"	June 24, 2021
14	6	"Gratitude"	July 1, 2021
15	7	"Return"	July 8, 2021
16	8	"Exodus"	July 15, 2021
