= You're Not You (novel) =

2006 novel by Michelle Wildgen

- First edition
- Author: Michelle Wildgen
- Language: English
- Publisher: St. Martin's Press
- Publication date: 30 May 2006
- Publication place: United States
- Media type: Print (hardcover)
- Pages: 288 pp
- ISBN: 978-0312352295

You're Not You is the debut novel by U.S. author Michelle Wildgen. It was published by St. Martin’s Press in 2006 and concerns a college student who cares for a classical pianist suffering with Lou Gehrig's Disease.

== Synopsis ==
Kate is a classical pianist who has been diagnosed with ALS. She and her husband place an advertisement for a new caretaker and end up hiring a college student named Bec, who is having an affair with a married professor. Kate finds that she gets along well with the younger woman, as Bec's bluntness lacks the condescension she has received from others. As the two grow closer, they begin to help each other through major events and issues in their lives. Kate discovers that her husband Evan has been having an affair, while Bec begins to take more charge of her own destiny.

== Release ==
You're Not You was first published in hardback in the United States through Thomas Dunne Books, an imprint of St. Martin's Press on May 30, 2006. This was followed by a paperback edition through Picador the following year.

== Film adaptation ==
In October 2014, a film adaption of You're Not You was released, starring Hilary Swank and Emmy Rossum.

== Reception ==
You're Not You received praise from The Capital Times and Publishers Weekly, the former writing that "Wildgen skillfully develops the increasing entanglement of Bec's life and identity with Kate's, so that the reader readily understands the depth of what Bec is feeling...". Lara Tupper reviewed the book for The Believer, calling it a "deeply sensual book, a Natural History of the Senses for foodies." Jeff Stayton of The Missouri Review noted that "While Kate's ultimate demise is inevitable, You're Not You sustains its plot and develops its characters quite unpredictably."
