= Rami Malek =

American actor (born 1981)

- رامي مالك
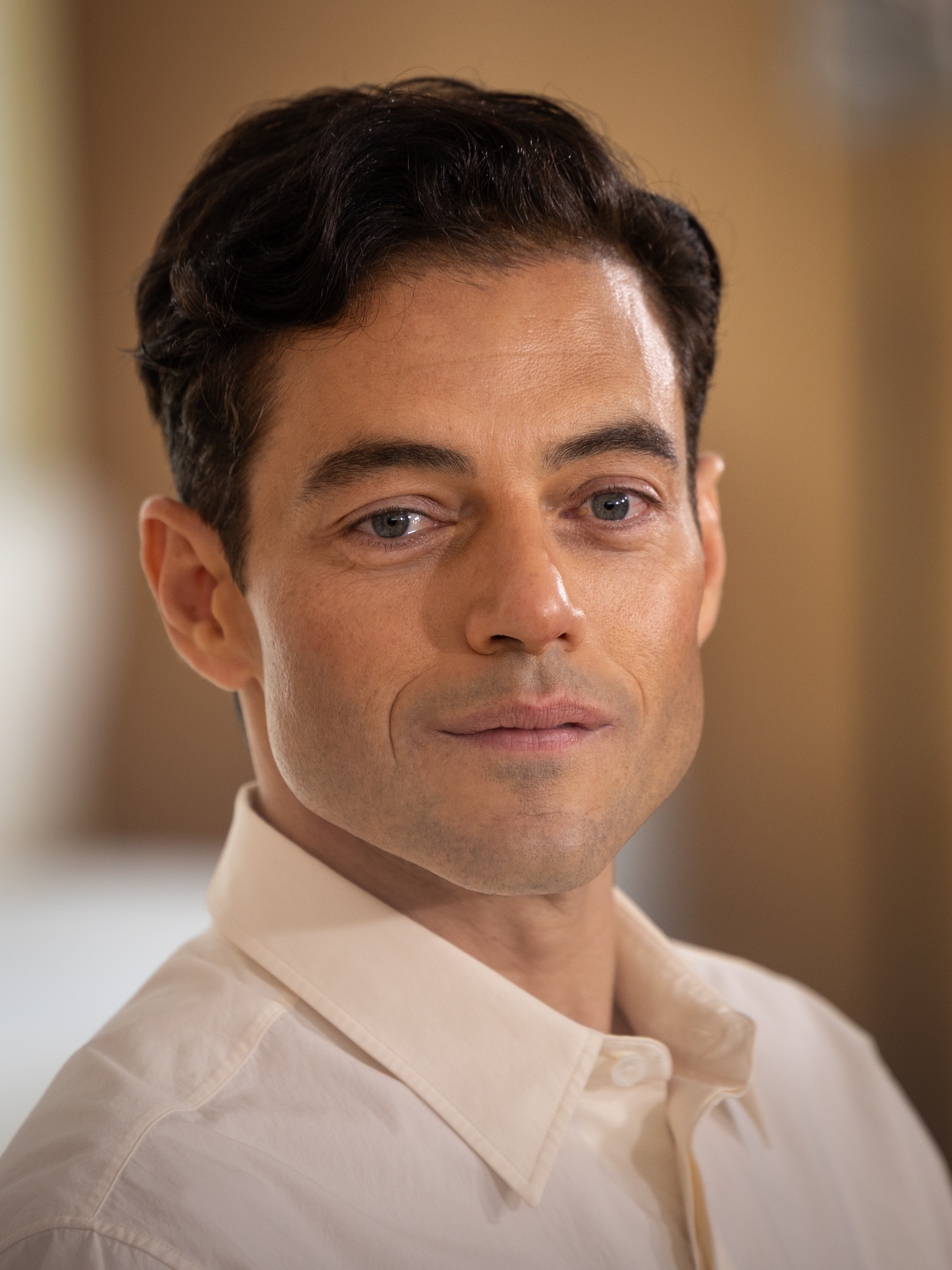
- Malek in 2026
- Born: Rami Said Malek; May 12, 1981 (age 45); Torrance, California, U.S.
- Education: University of Evansville (BFA)
- Years active: 2004–present
- Awards: Full list

Rami Said Malek (English: /ˈrɑːmi ˈmælɪk/; Arabic: رامي سعيد مالك, Egyptian Arabic: [ˈɾɑːmi sæˈʕiːd ˈmæːlek]; born May 12, 1981) is an American actor. He gained recognition for portraying Queen lead singer Freddie Mercury in the biographical film Bohemian Rhapsody (2018), for which he won numerous accolades, including the Academy Award for Best Actor in 2019, becoming the first actor of Egyptian heritage to win in that category. He played computer hacker Elliot Alderson in the USA Network television series Mr. Robot (2015–2019), for which he received the Primetime Emmy Award for Outstanding Lead Actor in a Drama Series.

Born in Torrance, California, to Egyptian immigrant parents of Coptic background, he studied theater before acting in plays in New York City. He had supporting roles in film and television, including the Fox Broadcasting Company sitcom The War at Home (2005–2007), the HBO miniseries The Pacific (2010), The Twilight Saga: Breaking Dawn – Part 2 (2012), and the Night at the Museum film trilogy (2006–2014). Since his breakthrough, Malek has starred in the crime film The Little Things (2021), played the main antagonist Lyutsifer Safin in the James Bond film No Time to Die (2021), portrayed David L. Hill in Christopher Nolan's biographical film Oppenheimer (2023), starred as a Central Intelligence Agency cryptographer in the spy film The Amateur (2025), and starred as psychiatrist Douglas Kelley in the film Nuremberg (2025).

== Early life and education ==
There's no first-generation, or second-generation removed. I am Egyptian. I grew up listening to Egyptian music. I loved Umm Kulthum. I loved Omar Sharif. These are my people. I feel so gorgeously tied to the culture and the human beings that exist there. I acknowledge that I have a different experience, but I am so enamoured and intertwined with Egyptian culture. It is the fabric of who I am.

— Malek in September 2018

Malek was born on May 12, 1981, in Torrance, California, a suburb of Los Angeles. His parents, Nelly Abdel-Malek and Said Malek (d. 2006), are Egyptian immigrants. His parents and older sister left Cairo in 1978 after his father Said, a travel agent and tour guide, became infatuated with Western visitors. They settled in Sherman Oaks, mostly staying in the San Fernando Valley. As a child, Malek rarely ventured into Hollywood, saying "I grew up in the San Fernando Valley in LA, but somehow, I had no idea that I lived right next to Hollywood... I truly thought that that was a million miles away, and it's just a 10-minute drive". His father sold insurance and was a travel agent, while his mother Nelly worked as an accountant. Malek was raised in his family's Coptic Orthodox Christian faith, and spoke Egyptian Arabic at home until the age of four. He has an identical twin brother Sami, who is younger by four minutes. His older sister, Jasmine, is an ER doctor. His parents emphasized to their children the importance of preserving their Egyptian roots, and his father would wake him up in the middle of the night to talk on the phone to his Arabic-speaking extended family in Samalut. He has stated that he is also one-eighth Greek.

As a first-generation American, Malek found it difficult to assimilate during his childhood because of cultural differences, even spending most of his childhood having his name mispronounced: "It only took me 'til high school where I found the confidence to tell everybody, 'No, my name is Rami.' It's a very upsetting thing to think about, that I didn't have the confidence to correct anyone at that point." As a result, he said it was difficult to form a self-identity as a child and gravitated towards "creating characters and doing voices" as he searched for an outlet for his energy.

Malek attended Notre Dame High School in Sherman Oaks, where he was in the same class as actress Rachel Bilson. Actress Kirsten Dunst also attended the school and shared a musical theater class with him. His parents harbored dreams of him becoming a lawyer, so he joined the debate team in his freshman year. Though he struggled to form arguments, his debate teacher noted his talent in dramatic interpretation and encouraged him instead to perform the Charles Fuller play Zooman and The Sign at a competition. Reflecting on the moment, he said, "On stage I'm having this moment with my dad with a bunch of other people [in the audience], but then I thought, 'Wow, something really special is happening here.'" It was the first time he saw his father become emotional, and his parents' positive reaction to his performance left him feeling free to pursue an acting career. He and his brother were both involved in the school's drama department.

After graduating in 1999, Malek went on to study theater at the University of Evansville in Evansville, Indiana. He also spent a semester abroad in England, where he studied at Harlaxton College in Harlaxton, Lincolnshire. During the summer before his senior year, he interned at the Eugene O'Neill Theater Center in Waterford, Connecticut, where he became an acquaintance of playwright August Wilson. Of his decision to attend the University of Evansville theater program, he said, "The level of talent at the University of Evansville was formidable from faculty to fellow actors. There's a commitment and dedication that the theater program required that unearthed a work ethic I didn't know I had." He completed his BFA in 2003. The college later honored him with a 2017 Young Alumnus Award, given to those who have "achieved personal success and contribute services to their community and to UE".

== Career ==
=== 2004–2009: Early work ===
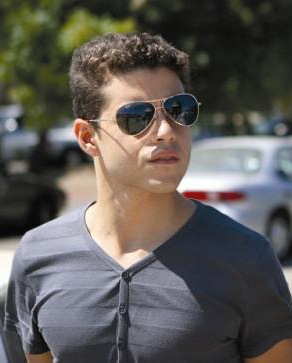
Malek in 2007

After his college graduation, Malek wanted to attend grad school for theater; with college debt growing, he moved to New York, where he shared a one-bedroom Lower East Side apartment with friends who were also in the theater community. His network of friends included writers and directors, many of whom would come together to form the Slant Theatre Project, and they would perform their own plays around the city. While visiting his family in Los Angeles, Malek met casting director Mali Finn, who convinced him to stay and look for work in Hollywood. After moving back in with his parents, he took jobs delivering pizzas and making falafel and shawarma sandwiches at a restaurant in Hollywood to make ends meet. Despite sending his resume to production houses, he found it difficult to get work as an actor, which led to bouts of depression and a loss of confidence. He considered getting a real estate license instead of pursuing an acting career.

After a year and a half, Malek finally received a call from casting director Mara Casey. She asked to speak to his agent. When he confessed he did not have one, she told him to get one first. After having a pleasant conversation, however, Malek suggested they meet anyway. She agreed, and the meeting led to him getting his first role in the TV sitcom Gilmore Girls; the episode he acted in first aired in January 2004. That same year, he starred in the theater production Johnny Boy at the 130-seat Falcon Theatre in Burbank, California and, later, in the production Shoes opposite Kelli Giddish with the Slant Theatre Project in New York City. He also voiced "additional characters" for the video game Halo 2, for which he was uncredited. In 2005, he received his Screen Actors Guild card for his work in two episodes of the Steven Bochco war drama Over There. Later that year, he appeared in an episode of Medium and was cast in the prominent recurring role of Kenny, on the Fox comedy series The War at Home. Kenny's "coming out" story earned accolades from GLAAD. In 2006, Malek made his feature film debut as Pharaoh Ahkmenrah in the comedy Night at the Museum. He reprised this role in the sequels Night at the Museum: Battle of the Smithsonian (2009) and Night at the Museum: Secret of the Tomb (2014). In the spring of 2007, he appeared on-stage as Jamie in the Vitality Productions theatrical presentation of Keith Bunin's The Credeaux Canvas at the Elephant Theatre in Los Angeles.

=== 2010–2015: Supporting roles ===
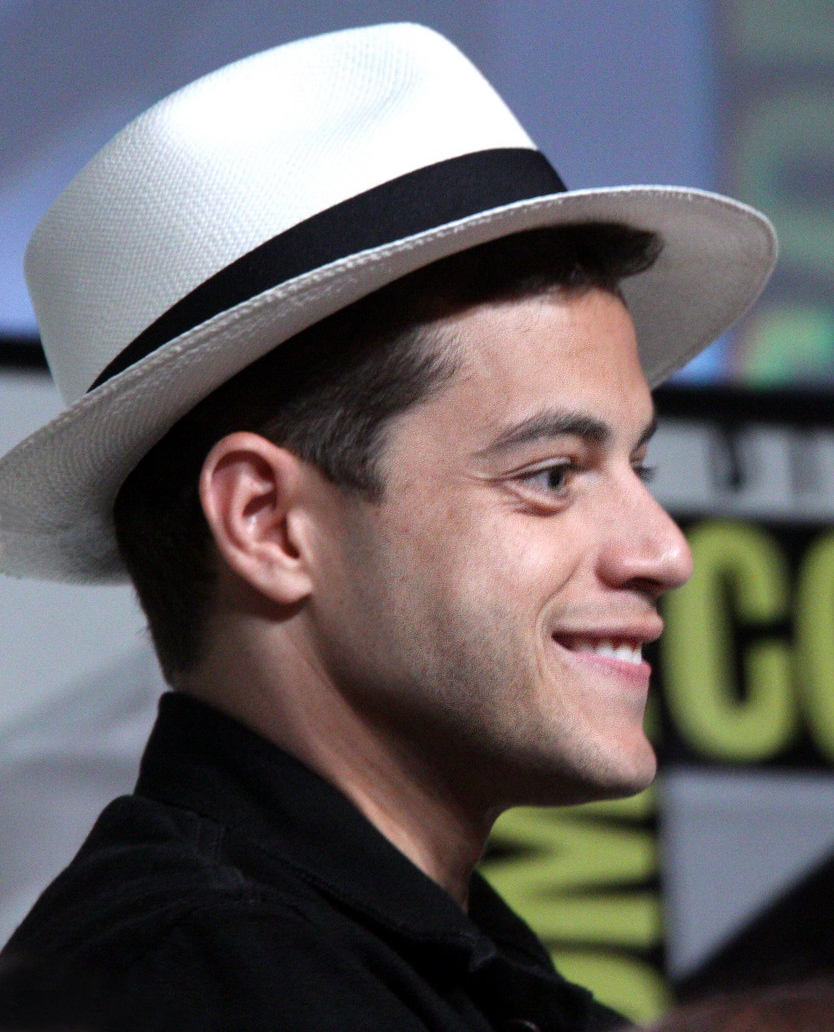
Malek at the 2012 San Diego Comic-Con

Malek returned to television in 2010 in a recurring role as the suicide bomber Marcos Al-Zacar on the eighth season of the Fox series 24. Growing weary of playing characters he called "acceptable terrorists", he instructed his agent to reject any role that painted Arabs or Middle Easterners in a "bad light". Later that year, he received critical acclaim for his portrayal of Corporal Merrill "Snafu" Shelton in the Emmy Award-winning HBO World War II mini-series The Pacific. After the intensity of filming The Pacific, he chose to leave Hollywood and lived briefly in Argentina, though he says it was unsuccessful, and he has "since found better ways of coping". During the filming of The Pacific, Malek received a letter from executive producer Tom Hanks praising Malek's performance. Hanks then cast him as college student Steve Dibiasi in the feature film Larry Crowne, released in July 2011.

Those opportunities led to Malek securing supporting roles in a series of major films. In August 2010, it was announced that he had been cast as the "Egyptian coven" vampire, Benjamin, in The Twilight Saga: Breaking Dawn – Part 2. In 2013 he played Nate, a new employee at a group home for youths, in the indie film Short Term 12, opposite Brie Larson. He appeared in two Spike Lee films during this period, the 2012 remake of the South Korean film Oldboy, in a part that was trimmed significantly, and later in the crowdfunded picture Da Sweet Blood of Jesus. The two men have remained friends. He also had minor roles in Battleship, the Oscar-nominated The Master, and Ain't Them Bodies Saints. He appeared as Josh, one of the main characters in Until Dawn, a horror game released for the PlayStation 4 on August 25, 2015. He lent his voice and likeness to the character and was fully motion-captured for the game.

=== 2015–present: Breakthrough and acclaim ===
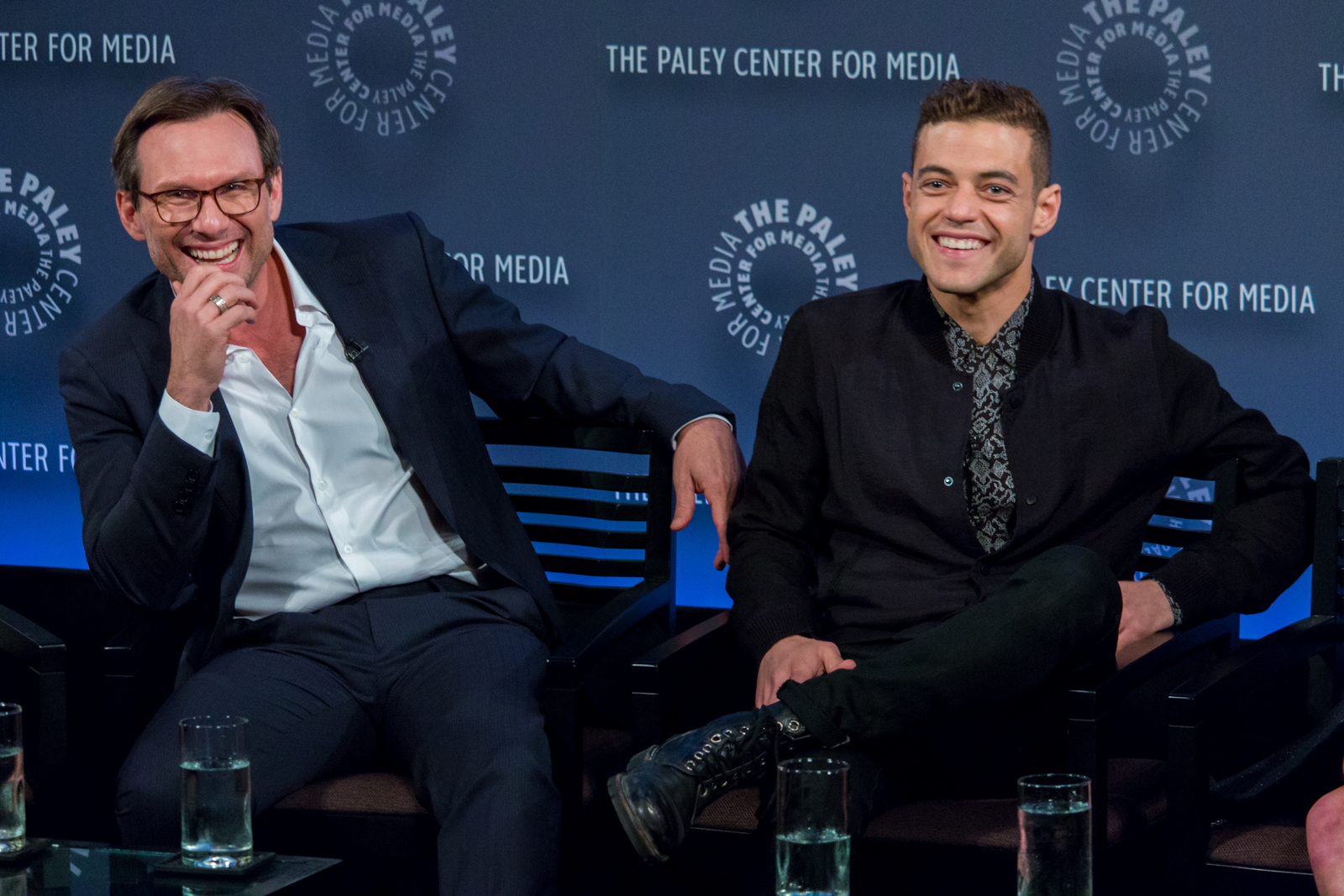
Malek and Christian Slater (left) speaking as part of the Mr. Robot panel during the 2015 PaleyFest

Screenwriter Sam Esmail had auditioned over 100 actors to play the lead character of Elliot Alderson (a mentally unstable computer-hacker) for a show he was developing. Having failed to cast the part, he considered re-writing the character altogether. However, after seeing Malek's audition in late summer 2014, Esmail said, "It opened my eyes to who Elliot really was". The resultant psychological drama, Mr. Robot, premiered on June 24, 2015, on the USA Network, with Malek in the lead role. To accurately play the character, who has mental and social disorders, he met with a psychologist. The role drew immediate acclaim from critics, with USA Today calling it his "breakout performance". Entertainment Weekly called Malek's "magnetic performance" the "best reason" to watch the show. Backstage remarked that Malek "anchored the drama" and that his "spin" on the anti-hero trope "promises a fresh direction for prestige TV". His performance earned him nominations for the Dorian Award, Satellite Award, Golden Globe Award, and Screen Actors Guild Award. He won the Critics' Choice Television Award for Best Actor in a Drama Series and the Primetime Emmy Award for Outstanding Lead Actor in a Drama Series. He was the first non-white actor to win an Emmy in that category since 1998. The show concluded in December 2019 with its fourth season, for which Malek received a third Golden Globe nomination for Best Actor in a Television Series – Drama.

Though he was among 3000 actors considered to play Han Solo in Solo: A Star Wars Story, Malek had his first starring role in Buster's Mal Heart, which premiered in September 2016 at the Toronto International Film Festival to positive reviews. In it, Malek plays a man who leads two lives, one as Jonah and another as Buster. Casting him in the role before his success with Mr. Robot, the director, Sarah Adina Smith, said, "I had no idea how huge and adored he would become". Reviewing the actor's performance, John DeFore of The Hollywood Reporter wrote, "Fans of Mr. Robot won't be disappointed in the least by this vehicle for Emmy-winning series star Rami Malek, which both fits in with Mr. Robot's delusion-prone paranoia and lets the charismatic actor stretch out in his first feature lead". Malek next starred as Louis Dega in Papillon, a remake of the 1973 film, co-starring Charlie Hunnam. It premiered at the 2017 Toronto International Film Festival, and had a limited box office release in August 2018. In 2017, Malek joined the cast of the Netflix animated comedy series BoJack Horseman (season 4), voicing the character Flip McVicker, a writer who does not trust email.

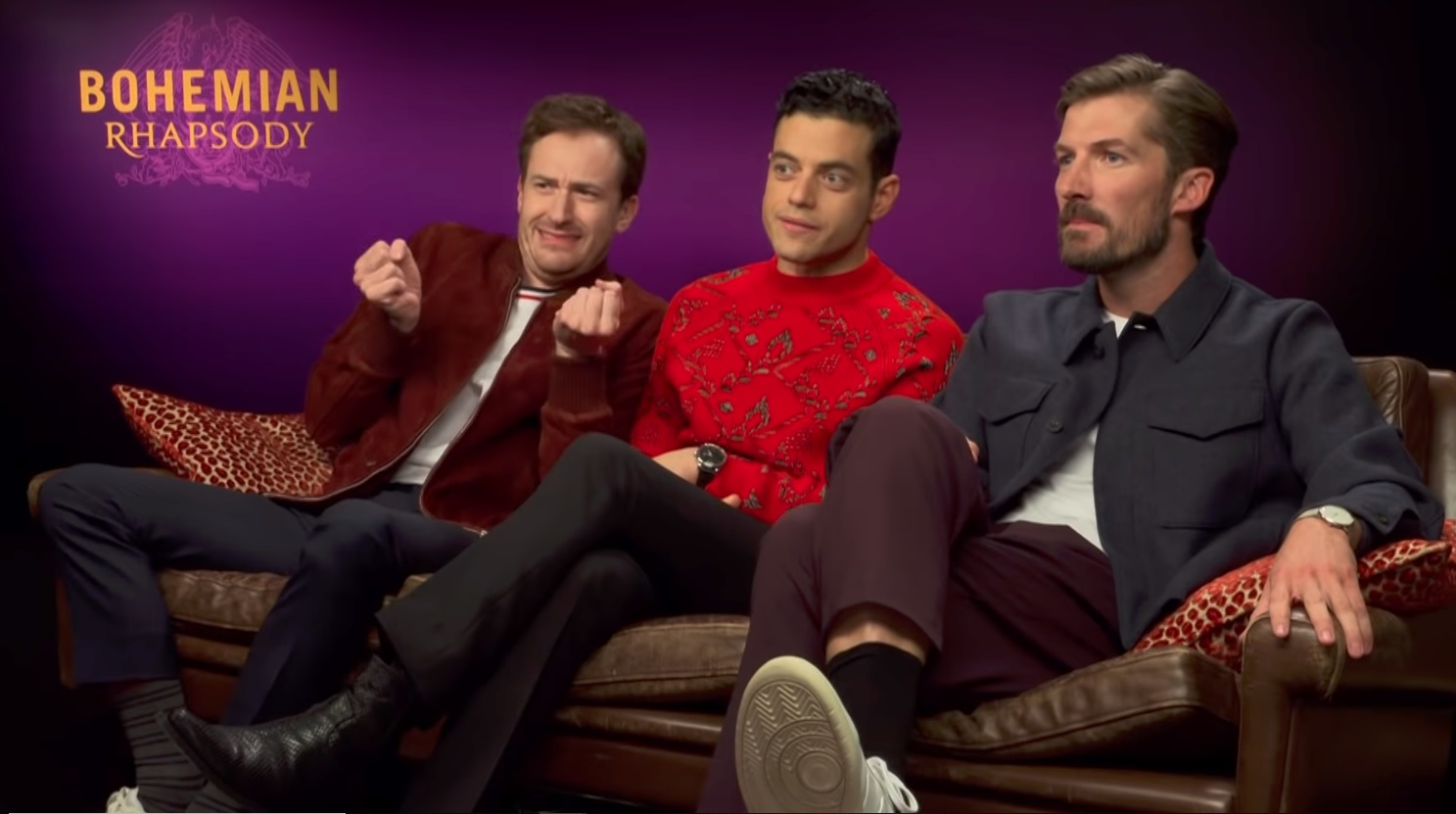
Joe Mazzello (left), Malek, and Gwilym Lee (right) promoting Bohemian Rhapsody in 2018

In 2018, Malek portrayed Freddie Mercury in the Queen biopic, Bohemian Rhapsody. The film premiered in London on October 23, 2018, and became a major box office success, grossing over $900 million worldwide on a production budget of about $50 million. It became the sixth highest-grossing film of 2018 worldwide, and is the second highest-grossing musical biographical film of all time. Though the film received mixed reviews overall, Malek's performance was acclaimed by critics. He won the Golden Globe for Best Actor in a Motion Picture Drama, the Screen Actors Guild Award for Outstanding Performance by a Male Actor in a Leading Role, the BAFTA Award for Best Actor in a Leading Role and the Academy Award for Best Actor for his performance in the film. In preparation for the role as Mercury, Malek moved to London where he worked with a dialect coach and a movement coach, and took piano and singing lessons. For four hours each day, he studied videos of Mercury with his movement coach, Polly Bennett. This included watching the 1985 Live Aid concert video on YouTube at least 1,500 times to perfect his performance for the film. He also had to get used to speaking and singing with a set of false teeth that mimicked Mercury's overbite. Brian May, Queen's guitarist who often attended filming, is quoted as saying that Malek's performance was so accurate that "we sometimes forgot he was Rami". Malek considers his role as Mercury the most important of his career, saying:

This is a role I don't think can be outdone. I think we're always searching for that next great role, and I guess I'm fortunate that I've already been met with it. I'd like to think that there is more out there for me to do, and there is, but I do doubt that there is anything that lives up to how precious this role and this human being have been in my life.

In December 2018, it was announced that Malek would produce and star in an eight-episode podcast called Blackout. Scott Conroy was the writer of the podcast, a thriller about a small-town radio DJ who must "fight to protect his family and community from a coordinated attack that destroys the power grid and upends modern civilization". The podcast debuted with two episodes on March 19, 2019, with six subsequent episodes premiering weekly. It won the 2020 Webby Award for Best Scripted Podcast (Fiction). Malek also voiced Chee-Chee the gorilla in Dolittle, starring Robert Downey Jr.; the film was produced in 2018 and released in January 2020. In May 2019, Malek joined the cast of the crime thriller The Little Things, opposite Denzel Washington and Jared Leto. The film was released on January 29, 2021. On April 25, 2019, Malek was cast as the main villain in the James Bond film No Time to Die; he plays the "supervillain" Lyutsifer Safin. Principal photography on the film began in April 2019 and wrapped that October. It had an initial release date of April 2020, but, due to COVID-19 related delays, was moved to October 2021. To support the release of the film, Malek hosted Saturday Night Live in October 2021.

Malek was part of the all-star ensemble cast in David O. Russell's Amsterdam; the film was produced in early 2021 and released in October 2022. In December 2021, it was announced that Malek was joining the cast of Christopher Nolan's Oppenheimer. In it he portrayed physicist David L. Hill. The film was released on July 21, 2023. In 2025, he starred in the thriller film The Amateur, as well as starring as U.S. Army psychiatrist Douglas Kelley in the historical drama Nuremberg.

In 2026, Malek starred in Ira Sachs's The Man I Love, to which he received critical acclaim for his performance as Jimmy George, a gay actor facing AIDS in the late 80s.

== Acting style ==
People didn't know where to place me with my ethnicity, and never was I ever up for leading anything. The fact that Rami Malek got to play the lead character, called Elliot Alderson, in Mr. Robot was somewhat of a coup, I think. I never saw that possibility when I was younger.

— Malek to The New Yorker, October 2018

Malek's early roles established him as a character actor. He has remarked that he enjoys the auditioning process, sees it as a "proving ground to test things out", and has created so many diverse characters for auditions that he wishes he could collect them as a package to show to others. After reading his own Wikipedia article, Malek elaborated and said, "I would take the time to prepare for auditions as if I was actually gonna perform. I would come with something fully formed and hope that that resonated. Sometimes it did, many times it didn't but that's the proving ground and I appreciate it". However, following his success with Mr. Robot, he began to be regarded as a "leading man", though an "unconventional" one. He is portrayed by comedian Pete Davidson in Saturday Night Live sketches parodying the character. In 2017, Malek accepted an invitation to join the Academy of Motion Picture Arts and Sciences, among 774 new members invited as part of the academy's efforts to diversify its members after criticism over the lack of diversity of the 88th Academy Awards.

To prepare for a role, he describes an initial stage of panic, followed by research into the character to create a world for that person. This includes finding music he thinks the character would listen to, as well as creating and imagining memories for that person to the point he has to perform as them. His most creative times are mornings and evenings. Malek likes to do experimental takes until he finds a take that will work. Director Sam Esmail noted that Malek is often dissatisfied with his work even when the director feels he has completed a perfect take. Because of their mutual insistence on getting a scene the best it can be, Esmail considers Malek a "co-creator". The actor has also been noted for his physical transformations to play his characters. He lost significant weight to play Elliot Alderson, Freddie Mercury, and Snafu Shelton, where Tom Hanks required that he maintain between six and eight-percent body fat. During the filming of The Pacific, Malek found it difficult to separate himself from his character, Snafu Shelton, which led to "some pretty intense mental anguish during and after filming". He noted the most valuable lesson from that experience was learning to distance himself from his characters, otherwise he would not have been able to take on complex roles later in his career, like Elliot Alderson in Mr. Robot.

== Public image ==
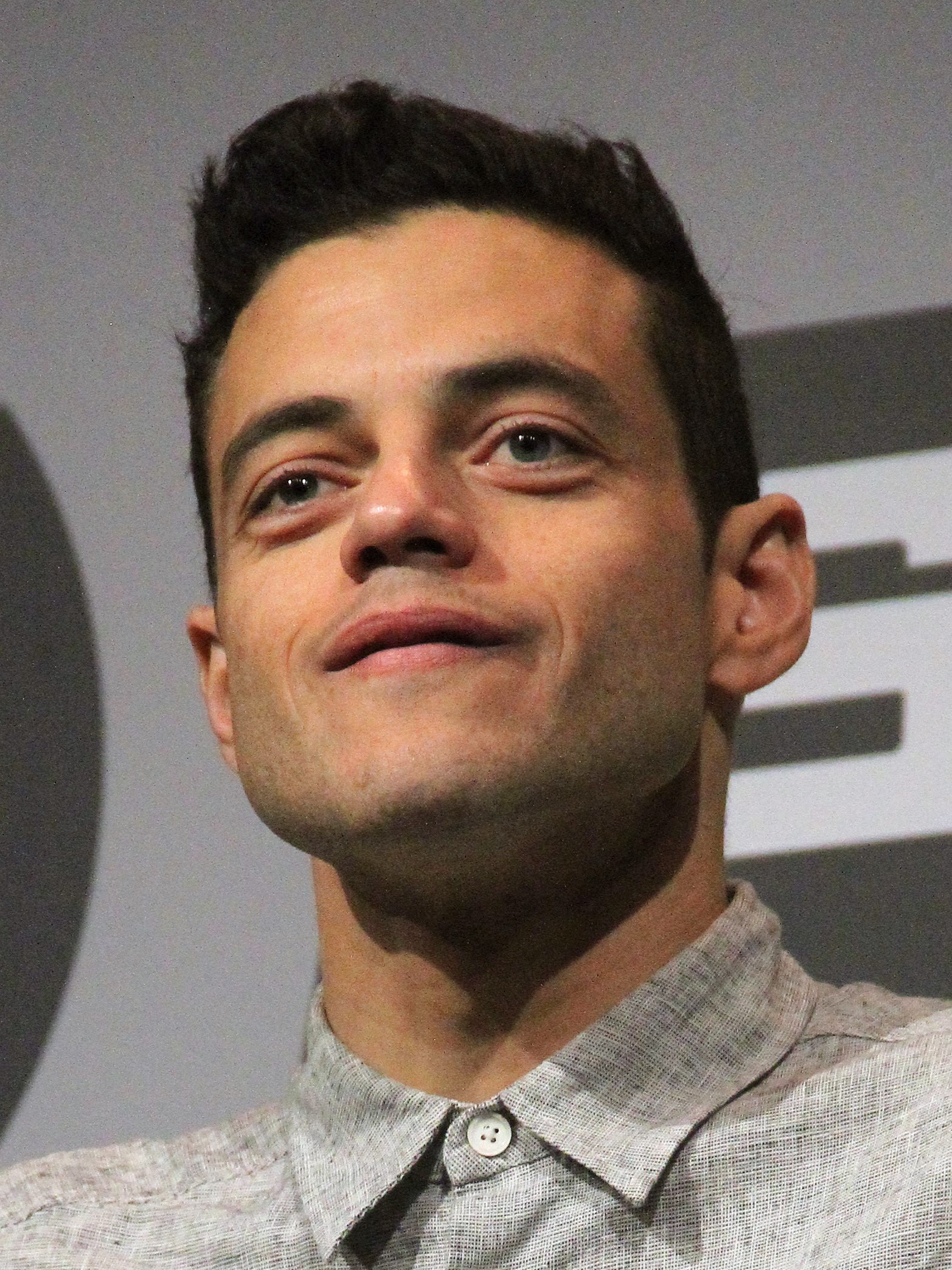
Malek at the 2016 South by Southwest

Malek's appearance has inspired commentary in the industry and in the media. GQ Middle East called Malek's aspect "vampiric ... with one of those faces that looks young and mature, all at once. When you speak, Malek's oversized eyes give you full attention". In a letter to the producer after Malek's audition for The Pacific, Tom Hanks remarked, "This guy's got haunting eyes". The Globe and Mail, in an interview after the 2016 Toronto International Film Festival, described the actor as "startlingly handsome ... with tawny skin and close-cropped curly hair. ... He speaks in a slow, just-woke-up drawl that contrasts with his dazzling smile and anything-goes energy. And he's mostly eyes. Giant, chalky blue eyes, the colour of one of those preternaturally still mineral lakes in the Rockies. They seem to see both outwardly and inwardly. They're sad, yet amused. Thousand-mile eyes".

He has also garnered attention for his fashion sense, particularly for his bold color choices and "quirky touches". He was chosen (along with Boy George and A$AP Rocky) to be part of Dior Homme's Spring 2017 campaign, and the face of Saint Laurent's Spring/Summer 2020 campaign. GQ Middle East launched in October 2018 with Malek on its first cover. Fashion commentators have included him on their "best-dressed" lists, often at red-carpet events. Placing him at number 29 on its list of Best Dressed Men 2019, GQ called his looks, "neat, elegant and perfectly put together, ... experimental on the surface, but underneath they're also surprisingly approachable". Ilaria Urbinati is his stylist.

Over time, Malek's prominence in the industry has grown. In 2015, The Hollywood Reporter included him on Next Gen 2015, its annual list of stars who are 35 and under and "on the rise". Time magazine named Malek one of the 100 most influential people in the world in 2019 under the category of Artists.

The actor has lent his support to charities, such as the Epidermolysis Bullosa Medical Research Foundation and the ACLU. In September 2018, Malek started working with the (RED) organization after being inspired by his Freddie Mercury role. As an ambassador to raise awareness and funds to help eliminate HIV/AIDS, Malek traveled to Eswatini to "learn more about the state of HIV/AIDS in sub-Saharan Africa". During his visit, Malek said, "To collectively come together and tackle, you know, arguably one of the largest, most horrific diseases anyone has ever known. That can happen right now. I can't think of anything that I'd rather be a part of, more than fulfilling any personal dream or aspiration".

== Personal life ==
Malek tends to be reserved in interviews, having mentioned in one of them his desire to stay "anonymous" abroad. He avoids social media. The New York Times called him "extremely reluctant to dish about himself". He says he is the opposite of the introverted character of Elliot that he plays in Mr. Robot, saying, "I'm an exuberant person. I thrive on affection. I like chit chat ... One of the great things about living in New York is that you meet so many strangers, and I love encounters with strangers; I love meeting people and hearing their stories."

Malek is Coptic, and went to a Coptic Church as a child.

In 2009, Malek moved into a house in the Laurel Canyon neighborhood of Los Angeles, alongside his brother. He purchased a neighboring house in 2021. From 2017 to 2023, Malek was in a relationship with actress Lucy Boynton. From 2023 to 2025, Malek was in a relationship with actor Emma Corrin.

== Acting credits ==
=== Film ===
Year	Title	Role	Notes	Ref.
2006	Night at the Museum	Pharaoh Ahkmenrah		
2009	Night at the Museum: Battle of the Smithsonian	Pharaoh Ahkmenrah		
2011	Larry Crowne	Steve Dibiasi		
2012	Battleship	U.S. Navy Lieutenant Hill		
2012	The Twilight Saga: Breaking Dawn – Part 2	Benjamin		
2012	The Master	Clark Massey		
2013	Ain't Them Bodies Saints	Will		
2013	Short Term 12	Nate		
2013	Oldboy	Matt Browning		
2014	Need for Speed	Finn		
2014	Night at the Museum: Secret of the Tomb	Pharaoh Ahkmenrah		
2014	Da Sweet Blood of Jesus	Seneschal Higginbottom		
2016	Buster's Mal Heart	Buster		
2017	Papillon	Louis Dega		
2018	Bohemian Rhapsody	Freddie Mercury		
2020	Dolittle	Chee-Chee (voice)		
2021	The Little Things	Jim Baxter		
2021	No Time to Die	Lyutsifer Safin		
2022	Amsterdam	Tom Voze		
2023	Oppenheimer	David Hill		
2025	The Amateur	Charles Heller	Also producer	
2025	Nuremberg	Douglas Kelley		
2026	The Man I Love	Jimmy George		

=== Television ===
Year	Title	Role	Notes	Ref.
2004	Gilmore Girls	Andy	Episode: "In the Clamor and the Clangor"	
2005	Over There	Hassan	2 episodes	
2005	Medium	Timothy Kercher	Episode: "Time Out of Mind"	
2005–2007	The War at Home	Kenny Al-Bahir	Recurring role, 21 episodes	
2010	24	Marcos Al-Zacar	3 episodes	
2010	The Pacific	Merriell "Snafu" Shelton	6 episodes	
2012	Alcatraz	Webb Porter	Episode: "Webb Porter"	
2012	The Legend of Korra	Tahno (voice)	3 episodes	
2014	Believe	Dr. Adam Terry	Episode: "Pilot"	
2015–2019	Mr. Robot	Elliot Alderson	Main role; also producer (seasons 3–4)	
2019–2021	Blackout	Simon Itani	podcast series - 16 episodes	
2017–2018	BoJack Horseman	Flip McVicker (voice)	10 episodes	
2021	Saturday Night Live	Himself (host)	Episode "Rami Malek/Young Thug"	

=== Theatre ===
Year	Title	Role	Venue	Ref.
2002	Fascination		National Playwrights Contest: July 2002	
2002	The Bebop Heard in Okinawa		National Playwrights Contest: July 2002	
2004	Johnny Boy	Paul	Falcon Theatre: March 31 – May 23, 2004	
2004	Shoes		Slant Theatre Project: August 2004	
2007	The Credeaux Canvas	Jamie	Elephant Theatre: March 22 – April 8, 2007	
2025	Oedipus	Oedipus	The Old Vic: 21 Jan–29 Mar 2025	

=== Video games ===
Year	Title	Voice role	Notes	Ref.
2004	Halo 2	Additional voices	Only in I Love Bees	
2014	The Legend of Korra	Tahno		
2015, 2024	Until Dawn	Joshua "Josh" Washington	Also likeness and motion capture performance	

=== Podcasts ===
Year	Title	Voice role	Notes	Ref.
2019	Blackout	DJ Simon Itani	Also producer	

== Awards and nominations ==
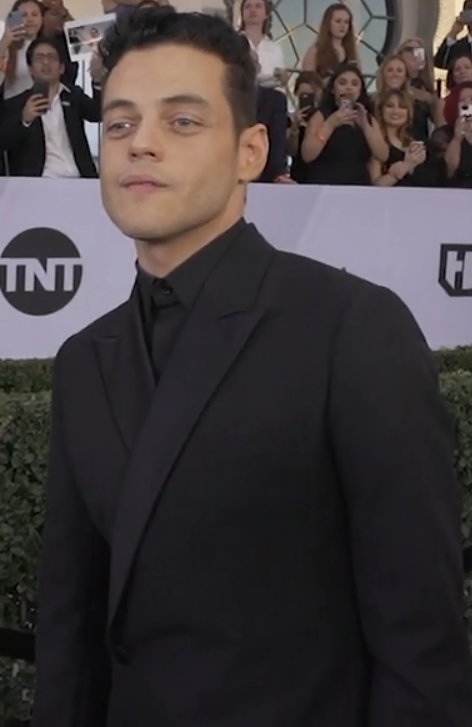
Malek at the 2019 Screen Actors Guild Awards red carpet

Malek has been nominated for and won several major industry awards. For his work on Mr. Robot, he has been nominated for three Golden Globes, an Emmy, two Satellite Awards, and two Screen Actors Guild Awards, among others, winning an Emmy for Outstanding Lead Actor in a Drama Series in 2016. He won an Academy Award for Best Actor in 2019, a Golden Globe for the Best Actor in a Motion Picture Drama, the Screen Actors Guild Award for Outstanding Performance by a Male Actor in a Leading Role, and the BAFTA Award for Best Actor in a Leading Role for his performance as Freddie Mercury in Bohemian Rhapsody.

He is the first actor of Egyptian heritage to win the Academy Award for Best Actor. While his win was celebrated in Egypt by the media and some government officials, Member of Parliament Mohamed Ismail criticized Malek's win: "I was surprised by the Egyptian media's celebration of Rami Malek, because the role played by Rami Malek in the film is far from his real character. He is trying to [spread] homosexuality among the youth... The award has a specific goal, which is to corrupt morality in the Arab world. Rami Malek is a bad example. If he was in Egypt, he would have been hanged". The organization Human Rights Watch stated that the country deserved an Oscar for hypocrisy for praising Malek, given its prohibition on LGBT people being celebrated in the media.
