= Dayo Okeniyi =

Nigerian actor (born 1988)

- Born: Oladayo A. Okeniyi; June 14, 1988 (age 38); Jos, Nigeria
- Occupation: Actor
- Years active: 2010–present
- Height: 174 cm (5 ft 9 in)

Oladayo A. Okeniyi (/ˈdaɪoʊ oʊˈkɛniiː/ DY-oh; born June 14, 1988) is a Nigerian actor, popularly known for playing the role of Thresh in The Hunger Games and Danny Dyson in Terminator Genisys.

== Early life and education ==
Dayo was born in Jos and grew up in Lagos, Nigeria, and has four siblings. His father is a retired customs officer from Ogbomosho, Oyo State, Nigeria, and his mother is a literature teacher from Kenya. In 2003, he moved with his family to Indiana, United States, from Nigeria, and later moved to California. He earned a bachelor's degree in visual communications at Anderson University (Indiana) in 2009.

== Career ==
Before being cast in The Hunger Games Okeniyi worked in local theatre and in film shorts. In 2014, Okeniyi starred in the drama film Endless Love. He portrayed Danny Dyson in the 2015 film Terminator Genisys. He starred in the NBC series Shades of Blue. He appeared in the film Fresh, which screened at the 2022 Sundance Film Festival.

== Filmography ==
=== Film ===
| Year | Title | Role | Notes |
|---|---|---|---|
| 2012 | The Hunger Games | Thresh | |
| 2013 | The Spectacular Now | Marcus | |
| 2013 | Runner, Runner | Lionel | |
| 2013 | Cavemen | Andre | |
| 2014 | Endless Love | Mace | |
| 2015 | Terminator Genisys | Danny Dyson | |
| 2016 | Good Kids | Conch | Comedy / Drama |
| 2020 | Emperor | Shields Green | Drama |
| 2020 | Run Sweetheart Run | Trey | |
| 2021 | Queenpins | Earl | Comedy / Crime |
| 2022 | Fresh | Paul | Thriller |
| 2022 | Rise | Charles Antetokounmpo | Alongside Uche Agada, Yetide Badaki |
| 2023 | Hypnotic | River | Directed by Robert Rodriguez |

=== Television ===
| Year | Title | Role | Notes |
|---|---|---|---|
| 2013 | Revolution | Alec | 1 episode |
| 2014 | Bones | Jarrick Henry | 1 episode |
| 2016–2018 | Shades of Blue | Michael Loman | Main role, 36 episodes |
| 2021 | See | Oloman | 4 episodes |
| 2024 | Iwájú | Tunde Martins (voice) | Main role, 6 episodes |
| 2024–present | Dark Matter | Leighton | Main role |

== Awards ==
=== Won ===
- 2013 Nigeria Entertainment Awards – Best International Actor

=== Nominated ===
- 2021 52nd NAACP Image Awards - Outstanding Breakthrough Performance in a Motion Picture
