= List of accolades received by Bohemian Rhapsody (film) =

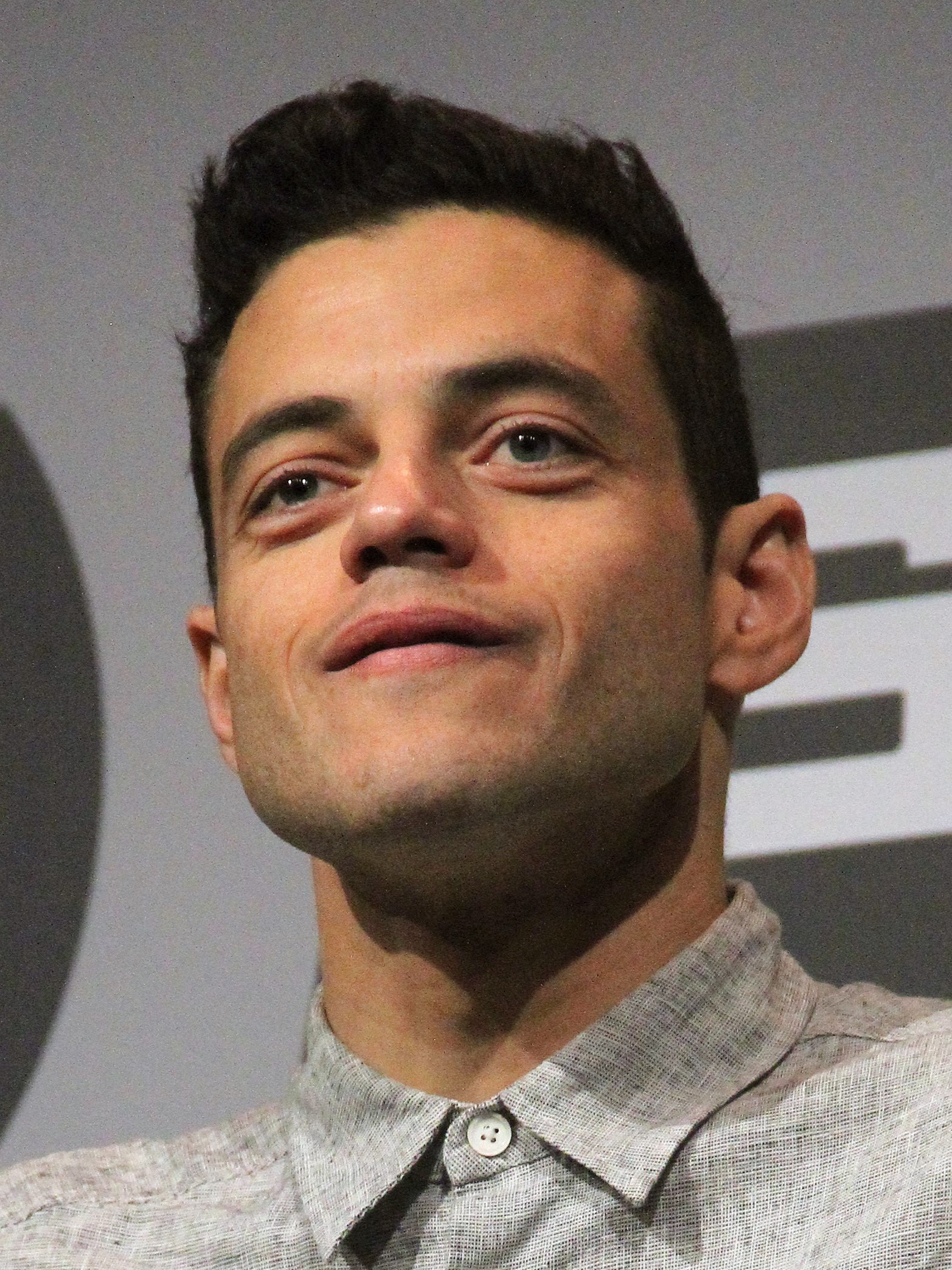
- Rami Malek received critical acclaim for his performance as Freddie Mercury.
Accolades
Award	Wins	Nominations
AACTA International Awards	1	3
AARP's Movies for Grownups Awards	1	2
Academy Awards	4	5
Alliance of Women Film Journalists	0	1
American Cinema Editors	1	1
Art Directors Guild Awards	0	1
Austin Film Critics Association	0	1
Bandung Film Festival	1	1
British Academy Film Awards	2	7
Chicago Film Critics Association	0	1
Cinema Audio Society Awards	1	1
Costume Designers Guild	0	1
Critics' Choice Movie Awards	0	3
Dallas–Fort Worth Film Critics Association	1	1
David di Donatello Awards	0	1
Detroit Film Critics Society	0	2
Georgia Film Critics Association	0	1
Golden Globe Awards	2	2
Grande Prêmio do Cinema Brasileiro	0	1
Guild of Music Supervisors Awards	0	1
Houston Film Critics Society	0	1
ICG Publicists Awards	0	1
Los Angeles Online Film Critics Society Awards	1	2
Make-Up Artists and Hair Stylists Guild Awards	0	2
Motion Picture Sound Editors' Golden Reel Awards	2	2
MTV Movie & TV Awards	0	2
Palm Springs International Film Festival	1	1
Producers Guild of America Awards	0	1
San Diego Film Critics Society	0	2
San Francisco Film Critics Circle	0	1
Santa Barbara International Film Festival	1	1
Satellite Awards	1	1
Screen Actors Guild Awards	1	2
Seattle Film Critics Society	0	1
St. Louis Film Critics Association	1	3
Visual Effects Society Awards	0	1
Washington D.C. Area Film Critics Association	0	1

Totals (Note: Certain award groups do not simply award one winner. They acknowledge several different recipients, have runners-up, and have third place. Since this is a specific recognition and is different from losing an award, runner-up mentions are considered wins in this award tally. For simplification and to avoid errors, each award in this list has been presumed to have had a prior nomination.)
- Wins: 22
- Nominations: 62

Bohemian Rhapsody is a 2018 biographical film about Freddie Mercury, lead singer of the British rock band Queen. It follows the singer's life from when he joins the band in 1970 to their 1985 Live Aid performance at the former Wembley Stadium in London. A British-American venture, it was produced by 20th Century Fox, New Regency, GK Films, and Queen Films, with Fox serving as distributor. Directed by Bryan Singer, it was written by Anthony McCarten, and produced by Graham King and Queen manager Jim Beach. It stars Rami Malek as Mercury, with Lucy Boynton, Gwilym Lee, Ben Hardy, Joe Mazzello, Aidan Gillen, Tom Hollander, Allen Leech, and Mike Myers in supporting roles. Queen members Brian May and Roger Taylor served as consultants. The film was released in the United Kingdom on 24 October 2018 and in the United States on 2 November 2018, and became a major box office success, grossing over $901 million worldwide on a production budget of about $50 million, becoming the sixth-highest-grossing film of 2018 worldwide and setting the all-time box office records for the biopic and drama genres.

Bohemian Rhapsody received numerous accolades, including a leading four awards at the 91st Academy Awards for Best Actor (Malek), Best Film Editing, Best Sound Editing and Best Sound Mixing; it was also nominated for Best Picture, making it Fox's final standalone release to be nominated in that category before its acquisition by The Walt Disney Company on March 20, 2019. The film won Best Motion Picture – Drama at the 76th Golden Globe Awards, and was nominated for the Producers Guild of America Award for Best Theatrical Motion Picture and BAFTA Award for Best British Film, while Malek won the Golden Globe, Screen Actors Guild and BAFTA awards for Best Actor.

In the wake of the renewed sexual abuse allegations against director Bryan Singer, GLAAD withdrew Bohemian Rhapsody's nomination for the year's GLAAD Media Award in the Outstanding Film – Wide Release category. On 6 February 2019, the British Academy of Film and Television Arts removed Singer's name from Bohemian Rhapsody's nomination for the BAFTA Award for Best British Film.

== Accolades ==
Award	Date of ceremony	Category	Recipient(s)	Result	Ref(s)
AACTA Awards	4 January 2019	Best Film	Bohemian Rhapsody	Nominated	
AACTA Awards	4 January 2019	Best Actor	Rami Malek	Won	
AACTA Awards	4 January 2019	Best Screenplay	Anthony McCarten	Nominated	
AARP's Movies for Grownups Awards	4 February 2019	Best Ensemble	Bohemian Rhapsody	Won	
AARP's Movies for Grownups Awards	4 February 2019	Best Time Capsule	Bohemian Rhapsody	Nominated	
Academy Awards	24 February 2019	Best Picture	Graham King	Nominated	
Academy Awards	24 February 2019	Best Actor	Rami Malek	Won	
Academy Awards	24 February 2019	Best Film Editing	John Ottman	Won	
Academy Awards	24 February 2019	Best Sound Editing	John Warhurst and Nina Hartstone	Won	
Academy Awards	24 February 2019	Best Sound Mixing	Paul Massey, Tim Cavagin and John Casali	Won	
Alliance of Women Film Journalists	10 January 2019	Best Actor	Rami Malek	Nominated	
American Cinema Editors Eddie Awards	1 February 2019	Best Edited Feature Film – Dramatic	John Ottman	Won	
Art Directors Guild Awards	2 February 2019	Excellence in Production Design for a Period Film	Aaron Haye	Nominated	
Austin Film Critics Association	7 January 2019	Best Actor	Rami Malek	Nominated	
Bandung Film Festival	22 November 2019	Honorable Imported Films	Bohemian Rhapsody	Won	
British Academy Film Awards	10 February 2019	Best British Film	Bohemian Rhapsody	Nominated	
British Academy Film Awards	10 February 2019	Best Actor in a Leading Role	Rami Malek	Won	
British Academy Film Awards	10 February 2019	Best Cinematography	Newton Thomas Sigel	Nominated	
British Academy Film Awards	10 February 2019	Best Sound	John Casali, Tim Cavagin, Nina Hartstone, Paul Massey, John Warhurst	Won	
British Academy Film Awards	10 February 2019	Best Costume Design	Julian Day	Nominated	
British Academy Film Awards	10 February 2019	Best Makeup and Hair	Mark Coulier, Jan Sewell	Nominated	
British Academy Film Awards	10 February 2019	Best Editing	John Ottman	Nominated	
Chicago Film Critics Association Awards	7 December 2018	Best Actor	Rami Malek	Nominated	
Cinema Audio Society Awards	16 February 2019	Outstanding Achievement in Sound Mixing for a Feature Film	Bohemian Rhapsody	Won	
Costume Designers Guild Awards	19 February 2019	Excellence in Period Film	Julian Day	Nominated	
Critics' Choice Movie Awards	13 January 2019	Best Actor	Rami Malek	Nominated	
Critics' Choice Movie Awards	13 January 2019	Best Costume Design	Julian Day	Nominated	
Critics' Choice Movie Awards	13 January 2019	Best Hair and Makeup	Bohemian Rhapsody	Nominated	
Dallas–Fort Worth Film Critics Association	17 December 2018	Best Actor	Rami Malek	2nd place	
David di Donatello Awards	27 March 2019	Best Foreign Film	Bohemian Rhapsody	Nominated	
Detroit Film Critics Society	3 December 2018	Best Actor	Rami Malek	Nominated	
Detroit Film Critics Society	3 December 2018	Best Use of Music	Bohemian Rhapsody	Nominated	
Georgia Film Critics Association	11 January 2019	Best Actor	Rami Malek	Nominated	
Golden Globe Awards	6 January 2019	Best Motion Picture – Drama	Bohemian Rhapsody	Won	
Golden Globe Awards	6 January 2019	Best Actor – Motion Picture Drama	Rami Malek	Won	
Grande Prêmio do Cinema Brasileiro	14 August 2019	Best Foreign Feature Film	Bohemian Rhapsody	Nominated	
Guild of Music Supervisors Awards	13 February 2019	Best Music Supervision for Films Budgeted Over $25 Million	Becky Bentham	Nominated	
Houston Film Critics Society	3 January 2019	Best Actor	Rami Malek	Nominated	
ICG Publicists Awards	22 February 2019	Maxwell Weinberg Publicist Showmanship of the Year – Motion Picture	Bohemian Rhapsody	Nominated	
Japan Academy Film Prize	1 March 2019	Outstanding Foreign Language Film	Bohemian Rhapsody	Won	
Los Angeles Online Film Critics Society Awards	9 January 2019	Best Actor	Rami Malek	Won	
Los Angeles Online Film Critics Society Awards	9 January 2019	Best Comedy/Musical	Bohemian Rhapsody	Nominated	
Make-Up Artists and Hair Stylists Guild Awards	16 February 2019	Feature-Length Motion Picture – Best Period and/or Character Make-Up	Jan Sewell, Mark Coulier	Nominated	
Make-Up Artists and Hair Stylists Guild Awards	16 February 2019	Feature-Length Motion Picture – Best Period and/or Character Hair Styling	Jan Sewell, Julio Parodi	Nominated	
Motion Picture Sound Editors' Golden Reel Awards	17 February 2019	Feature Film – Musical	Bohemian Rhapsody	Won	
Motion Picture Sound Editors' Golden Reel Awards	17 February 2019	Feature Film – Dialogue / ADR	Bohemian Rhapsody	Won	
MTV Movie & TV Awards	17 June 2019	Best Performance in a Movie	Rami Malek	Nominated	
MTV Movie & TV Awards	17 June 2019	Best Musical Moment	"Live Aid" Concert	Nominated	
Palm Springs International Film Festival	3 January 2019	Breakthrough Performance Award	Rami Malek	Won	
Producers Guild of America	19 January 2019	Best Theatrical Motion Picture	Graham King	Nominated	
San Diego Film Critics Society	10 December 2018	Best Breakout Artist	Rami Malek	Nominated	
San Diego Film Critics Society	10 December 2018	Best Use of Music in a Film	Bohemian Rhapsody	Nominated	
San Francisco Film Critics Circle	9 December 2018	Best Actor	Rami Malek	Nominated	
Santa Barbara International Film Festival	1 February 2019	Outstanding Performance of the Year Award	Rami Malek	Won	
Satellite Awards	17 February 2019	Best Actor – Comedy/Musical	Rami Malek	Won	
Screen Actors Guild Award	27 January 2019	Outstanding Performance by a Male Actor in a Leading Role	Rami Malek	Won	
Screen Actors Guild Award	27 January 2019	Outstanding Performance by a Cast in a Motion Picture	Lucy Boynton, Aidan Gillen, Ben Hardy, Tom Hollander, Gwilym Lee, Allen Leech, Rami Malek, Joe Mazzello, and Mike Myers	Nominated	
Seattle Film Critics Society	17 December 2018	Best Actor	Rami Malek	Nominated	
St. Louis Film Critics Association	16 December 2018	Best Soundtrack	Bohemian Rhapsody: The Original Soundtrack	Won	
St. Louis Film Critics Association	16 December 2018	Best Actor	Rami Malek	Nominated	
St. Louis Film Critics Association	16 December 2018	Special Merit (for best scene, cinematic technique or other memorable aspect or moment)	Live Aid	Nominated	
Visual Effects Society Awards	5 February 2019	Outstanding Supporting Visual Effects in a Feature Motion Picture	Paul Norris, Tim Field, May Leung, and Andrew Simmonds	Nominated	
Washington D.C. Area Film Critics Association	3 December 2018	Best Actor	Rami Malek	Nominated	

== See also ==
- 2018 in film
