= Bohemian Rhapsody (film) =

2018 film by Bryan Singer

- Theatrical release poster
- Directed by: Bryan Singer (Note: Singer was replaced by Dexter Fletcher towards the end of principal photography. In accordance with Directors Guild of America guidelines, Singer retained sole director credit, while Fletcher is credited as an executive producer.)
- Screenplay by: Anthony McCarten
- Story by: Anthony McCarten; Peter Morgan
- Produced by: Graham King; Jim Beach
- Starring: Rami Malek; Lucy Boynton; Gwilym Lee; Ben Hardy; Joe Mazzello; Aidan Gillen; Allen Leech; Tom Hollander; Mike Myers
- Cinematography: Newton Thomas Sigel
- Edited by: John Ottman
- Production companies: Regency Enterprises; GK Films
- Distributed by: 20th Century Fox
- Release dates: 23 October 2018 (Wembley Arena); 24 October 2018 (United Kingdom); 2 November 2018 (United States)
- Running time: 134 minutes
- Countries: United Kingdom; United States
- Language: English
- Budget: $50–55 million
- Box office: $911 million

Bohemian Rhapsody is a 2018 musical biographical drama film that focuses on the life of Freddie Mercury, the lead singer of the British rock band Queen, from the formation of the band in 1970 to their 1985 Live Aid performance at the original Wembley Stadium. The film was directed by Bryan Singer from a screenplay by Anthony McCarten, based on a story by McCarten and Peter Morgan. It stars Rami Malek as Mercury, with Lucy Boynton, Gwilym Lee, Ben Hardy, Joe Mazzello, Aidan Gillen, Allen Leech, Tom Hollander, and Mike Myers in supporting roles. Queen members Brian May and Roger Taylor also served as consultants.

The film was announced in late 2010, with Sacha Baron Cohen set to play Mercury. After he left the project in mid-2013 following creative differences with producers, the project languished until Malek was cast and Singer was hired as director in November 2016. Singer served as director through most of principal photography, which began in London in September 2017, but was fired in December of the same year due to frequent absences and clashes with the cast and crew. Dexter Fletcher, who was originally set to direct when the project was early in development, was hired to complete the film; Singer retained sole director credit as per Directors Guild of America guidelines, while Fletcher received an executive producer credit. Filming concluded in January 2018.

Bohemian Rhapsody premiered at the Wembley Arena on October 23, 2018, and was released by 20th Century Fox in the United Kingdom the next day and in the United States on 2 November, to mixed reviews from critics. While the musical sequences and Malek's performance were particularly praised, Singer's direction, the film's portrayal of Mercury and other personnel, and its use of creative licence were criticized. However, it became a major box office success, grossing over $911 million worldwide on a production budget of $50–55 million, becoming the sixth-highest-grossing film of 2018 worldwide and setting, at the time of its release, the all-time box office records for the biographical (Note: Until Oppenheimer passed it with a $912.7 million gross as of 18 September 2023.) and drama genres. Since then, the film has slipped to the third highest-grossing biographical film.

Bohemian Rhapsody received numerous accolades, including a leading four wins at the 91st Academy Awards for Best Actor (Malek), Best Film Editing, Best Sound Editing and Best Sound Mixing; it was also nominated for Best Picture. The film also won Best Motion Picture – Drama at the 76th Golden Globe Awards, and was nominated for the Producers Guild of America Award for Best Theatrical Motion Picture and BAFTA Award for Best British Film, while Malek won the Golden Globe, Screen Actors Guild and BAFTA for Best Actor.

== Plot ==
In 1970, Farrokh Bulsara, a baggage handler at Heathrow Airport, sees Smile, a local college band, perform at a pub. Seeking them out after the show, he meets and is attracted to Mary Austin, who works at the boutique Biba. Farrokh finds drummer Roger Taylor and guitarist Brian May and learns that their lead singer and bassist, Tim Staffell, has quit to join Humpy Bong. Farrokh offers himself as a replacement singer and impresses them with his vocal ability. Farrokh seeks out Mary at Biba and they start dating. The band plays gigs across Britain with Farrokh as the lead singer and John Deacon as the bassist. Farrokh pushes them to think bigger and sells their van to finance a record album. An A&R rep from EMI asks engineer Roy Thomas Baker for demos.

Farrokh changes his name to Freddie Mercury and renames the band Queen. They sign with John Reid, who books an American tour. Paul Prenter, who is attracted to Freddie, manages their daily schedule. An appearance on Top of the Pops gives Queen their first hit, "Killer Queen". Freddie proposes to Mary, but begins to question his sexuality soon after. In 1975, the band records their fourth studio album, A Night at the Opera, but end up quitting EMI when executive Ray Foster refuses to release "Bohemian Rhapsody" as the album's lead single. Freddie conspires with radio DJ Kenny Everett to debut the song on his programme, and "Bohemian Rhapsody" becomes a global hit. Following a world tour, Freddie begins an affair with Paul and comes out to Mary as bisexual. They break off their engagement, but remain close friends.

In the early 1980s, the band's success continues with hits such as "We Will Rock You" and "Another One Bites the Dust", but tensions arise over Paul's influence on Freddie. During a party, Freddie finds himself attracted to a waiter, Jim Hutton. Paul encourages Reid to convince Freddie to pursue a solo career, but the idea offends Freddie; Paul feigns ignorance and Freddie fires Reid without consulting his bandmates. Jim "Miami" Beach, the band's lawyer, takes over management. During a press conference for the band's album Hot Space in 1982, the media bombards Freddie with inquiries about his health and sexuality.

Following the controversial music video for "I Want to Break Free", in which the band appears in drag, Freddie leaves Queen and signs a $4-million solo deal with CBS Records. He records his 1984 solo album Mr. Bad Guy in Munich and indulges in drugs and gay orgies with Paul, but is dissatisfied and starts to feel unwell. Mary, now married and pregnant, urges him to return to Queen and perform at the benefit concert Live Aid. Realizing that Paul withheld news of Live Aid and has been a corrosive influence, Freddie fires him. In retaliation, Paul publicly reveals details about Freddie's sexual exploits.

Freddie returns to London, reconciles with his bandmates and persuades them to play at Live Aid as a late addition. Upon learning that he has HIV, Freddie reveals his condition to his bandmates, but asks that it be kept a secret from the public, wishing to make music for as long as he has left. On the day of Live Aid, Freddie reconnects with Hutton, Mary, and his family, and heeds his father's Zoroastrian maxim, "Good thoughts, good words, good deeds". Freddie and the band deliver an outstanding performance at Live Aid, helping to increase donations.

Intertitles reveal that Freddie died of AIDS-related pneumonia in 1991, leading to the re-release of "Bohemian Rhapsody" and the founding of the Mercury Phoenix Trust.

== Cast ==
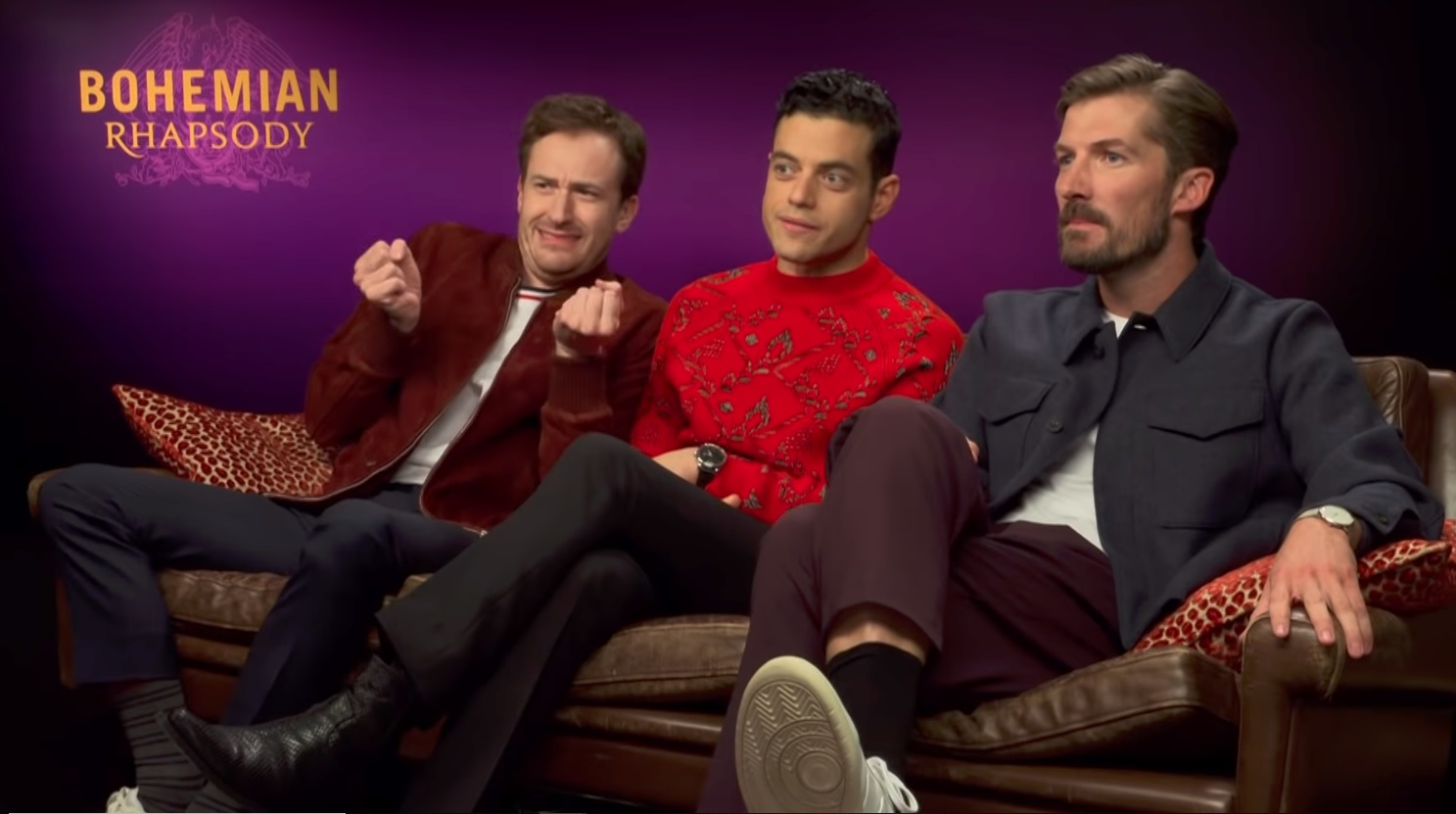
(Left to right) Joe Mazzello, Rami Malek, and Gwilym Lee promoting the film in 2018.

- Rami Malek as Freddie Mercury (Farrokh Bulsara), British musician, songwriter and lead vocalist of Queen
  - Freddie Mercury as himself (singing, archival recordings)
  - Marc Martel as Freddie Mercury (additional singing, uncredited)
- Lucy Boynton as Mary Austin, Mercury's former fiancée, close friend and muse
- Gwilym Lee as Brian May, Queen's lead guitarist.
- Ben Hardy as Roger Taylor, Queen's drummer.
- Joe Mazzello as John Deacon, Queen's bassist.
- Aidan Gillen as John Reid, Queen's first manager
- Allen Leech as Paul Prenter, Mercury's personal manager and lover
- Tom Hollander as Jim "Miami" Beach, Queen's lawyer turned manager
- Mike Myers as Ray Foster, a fictional EMI executive (based on Roy Featherstone)
- Aaron McCusker as Jim Hutton, Mercury's boyfriend
- Meneka Das as Jer Bulsara, Mercury's mother
- Ace Bhatti as Bomi Bulsara, Mercury's father
- Priya Blackburn as Kashmira Bulsara, Mercury's sister
- Tim Plester as Roy Thomas Baker, Queen's co-producer
- Dermot Murphy as Bob Geldof, Live Aid organiser
- Dickie Beau as Kenny Everett, radio broadcaster from Capital London, BBC Radio 1, and BBC Radio 2
- Jack Roth as Tim Staffell, vocalist & bassist of the band Smile
- Max Bennett as David, Mary's new boyfriend (later husband)
- Neil Fox-Roberts as Mary's father
- Michelle Duncan as Shelley Stern, a reporter
- Adam Lambert as trucker (uncredited)
- Luke Deacon (John Deacon's son) as concert attendee (uncredited)
- Emily May (Brian May's daughter) as concert attendee (uncredited)

== Production ==
=== Development ===
Plans for a film about Queen were revealed in September 2010 by the band's guitarist Brian May. Covering the period up to Live Aid in 1985, the film was to feature Sacha Baron Cohen as Freddie Mercury, with Graham King to co-produce, and Peter Morgan to write the screenplay. May confirmed in April 2011 that the production was moving forward. He approved of Baron Cohen as Mercury but had reservations about the project's possible direction. The band's concerns focused on avoiding any harm to Mercury's legacy.

In July 2013, Baron Cohen left the project due to creative differences. Allegedly, he had wanted a "gritty R-rated tell-all" focused on Mercury, while Queen hoped for a PG-rated film about the band. May said later in 2013 that Baron Cohen had left the project on good terms. Comments by May and Roger Taylor suggested that Baron Cohen was too well known as a comedian and prankster (due largely to his fictional personae Ali G and Borat), and that his presence in the film would be distracting. In March 2016, Baron Cohen spoke about misunderstandings with Queen about the subject and events of the film, in particular, whether the story ought to continue past Mercury's 1991 death. He also mentioned artistic disagreements with the band over the composition of the production team, referring specifically to Baron Cohen recruiting Morgan, David Fincher, and Tom Hooper.

Following Baron Cohen's departure, in December 2013, Ben Whishaw was mentioned as a possible replacement to play Mercury. Also at this time, Dexter Fletcher was selected as the film's director. Fletcher removed himself from the project early the following year, amid reports of creative disagreements with King. In August 2014, Whishaw suggested that the film was not progressing well and that there had been scripting problems. Whishaw left the project seven months later. Rumours followed in 2015 that Baron Cohen had rejoined the project, or that Whishaw might return.

In November 2015, screenwriter Anthony McCarten became attached to the project, which now had the working title of Bohemian Rhapsody after Queen's song of the same name. Developing a fresh take on the story from his interviews with May and Taylor, he delivered his first draft in February 2016. A year later, Bryan Singer was in talks to take over as director, Rami Malek was cast as Mercury, and the film was fast-tracked by 20th Century Fox and New Regency. It was reported in 2015 that Johnny Flynn was due to play Roger Taylor and that Gemma Arterton would play Mercury's partner Mary Austin.

In May 2017, Malek confirmed that he had conducted recordings at Abbey Road Studios and had consulted Taylor and May. The same month, Entertainment Weekly reported that Taylor and May were serving as music producers. In August 2017, Justin Haythe was revealed to have penned another draft of the script.

=== Casting ===
Susie Figgis was responsible for casting and suggesting Malek. On 4 November 2016, it was announced that Rami Malek would star as Freddie Mercury, after the producers saw his work in Mr. Robot. He had to make a pre-recording at Abbey Road Studios, which was sent to Queen members for approval. On 21 August 2017, additional cast members were announced: Ben Hardy as drummer Roger Taylor, Gwilym Lee as lead guitarist Brian May, and Joseph Mazzello as bass guitarist John Deacon. On 30 August 2017, it was reported that Allen Leech had been cast in the film to play Mercury's personal manager, Paul Prenter, who worked for him from 1977 to 1987, when he was fired for betraying Mercury by selling his personal information to UK newspapers.

On 6 September 2017, Lucy Boynton was cast to play Mercury's long-term girlfriend, Mary Austin. Lindsey Stirling, Bryce Dallas Howard, Maria Bello and Ashley Johnson were also considered. On 11 September 2017, Mike Myers joined the cast to play EMI executive Ray Foster, and on 22 September 2017, Aaron McCusker was added to play Mercury's long-term boyfriend Jim Hutton. On 26 September 2017, it was announced that Aidan Gillen had been cast as John Reid, Queen's second manager, from 1975 to 1978, who took over from Norman Sheffield of Trident Studios; while Tom Hollander was set to play Jim Beach, Queen's third manager, who took over from John Reid in 1978. The film includes cameos by current Queen vocalist Adam Lambert as a truck driver and the film's editor John Ottman as a live TV director. Luke Deacon, son of John Deacon, also makes a cameo appearance as a college student, attending the pub where Smile plays.

=== Filming ===
Pre-production began in July 2017 in the United Kingdom, with principal photography commencing in London in September 2017. Queen archivist Greg Brooks was instrumental in helping recreate each scene to make it as true to life as possible. He worked daily with Fox for months from the beginning, providing answers to questions. There were about a hundred extras, who were all individually scanned 360° and digitally replicated to imitate a larger crowd. The entire Live Aid performance was filmed on a giant set at the former airfield RAF Bovingdon, but in the final cut "We Will Rock You" and "Crazy Little Thing Called Love" were cut out.

When Malek was contacted about playing Mercury, he had only a casual knowledge of Queen. To embody Mercury, Malek had to work many intense sessions with a movement coach (as well as learn to talk with prosthetic teeth). Malek's protruding teeth were crafted by artist Chris Lyons. Besides examining Mercury's movements, they also watched footage of Liza Minnelli, who was an inspiration to Mercury's stage moves. Malek took singing and piano lessons and had an accent coach. He said, "I had to re-create things he did on the fly, onstage. There were many days I said to myself, 'This is a lost cause.'" After finishing the film, Malek said that he became a "Queen super-fan", specifying, "I see Freddie as the best performer of all time... I never ceased to be astonished by this man." While Malek sang some parts in the film, producers inserted vocal stems from Queen songs as well as filling in parts with Canadian vocalist Marc Martel, a winner of the Queen Extravaganza Live Tour auditions.

==== Firing of Bryan Singer and his replacement ====
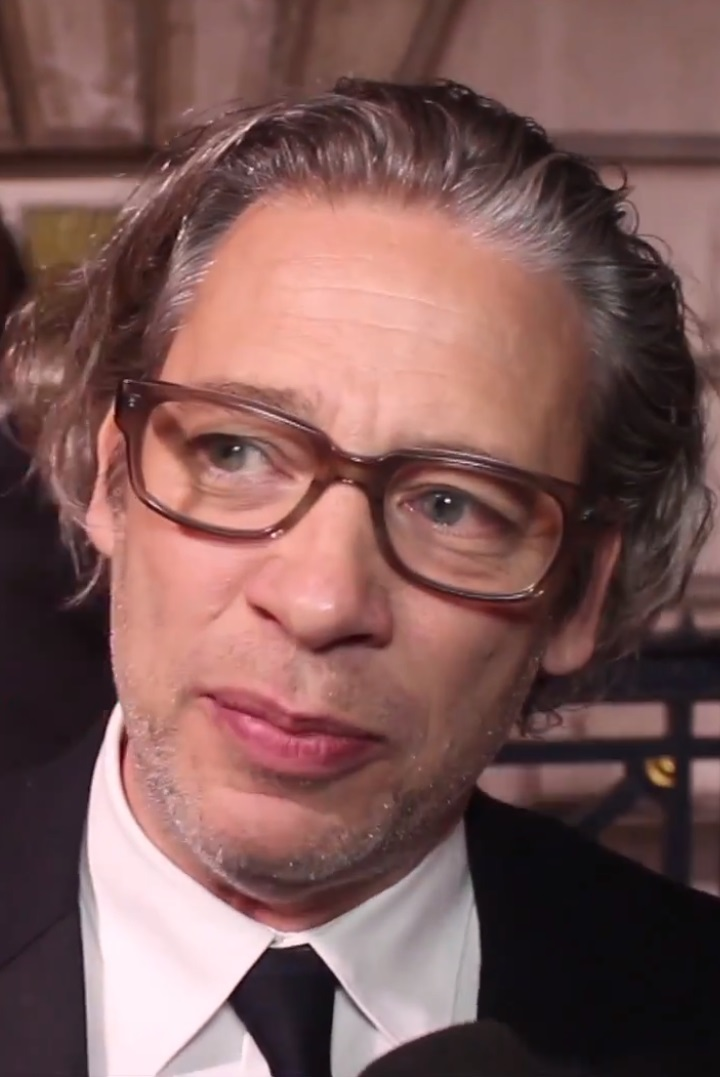
Dexter Fletcher replaced Bryan Singer as director during filming

On 1 December 2017, The Hollywood Reporter reported that 20th Century Fox had temporarily halted production due to the "unexpected unavailability" of director Bryan Singer. Sources said that Singer had not returned to the set after the Thanksgiving week (20–26 November). Discussions began about replacing him. Cinematographer Newton Thomas Sigel stepped in to direct during Singer's non-showings. Singer's absence was reportedly due to "a personal health matter concerning Bryan and his family". With under three weeks left on the shoot, Singer requested a filming hiatus as his mother was extremely ill. Other sources claimed that Malek and the crew had grown tired of Singer's behaviour, including Singer's late arrivals to set and clashes with Malek. Tom Hollander briefly quit the film over issues with Singer but was convinced to return. On 4 December 2017, Singer was fired as director, with about two weeks of scheduled principal photography remaining.

On 6 December 2017, Dexter Fletcher was announced as Singer's replacement and on 15 December, filming resumed with Fletcher directing. Fletcher later estimated that two-thirds of the principal photography had been completed when he joined the production, saying, "I came into the last few weeks of principal photography and editing and the bits and pieces like that... I was looking at two complete [acts] in a good film, and [I had to] not let it down."

On 30 January 2018, Gwilym Lee posted to social media that filming had finished. Visual effects were provided by DNEG and supervised by Paul Norris.

==== Directing credit ====
According to the Directors Guild of America, only one director can be named for a film, and the DGA has sole control over who that will be. Although Fletcher replaced Singer with two weeks left in the production, Singer had hired the cast, crew and shot most of the film. Producer Graham King announced in June 2018 that Singer would receive the directing credit on the finished film. Fletcher received an executive producer credit.

=== Music ===
John Ottman, a frequent collaborator of Singer, edited the film's soundtrack. The film lacks an original underscore, deviating from previous Singer-Ottman collaborations on which the latter has also served as composer. An official soundtrack album was released by Hollywood Records and Virgin EMI Records on CD, cassette and digital formats on 19 October 2018. The album contains several Queen hits and 11 previously unreleased recordings, including five tracks from their 21-minute Live Aid performance in July 1985, which have never before been released in audio form. Vinyl releases (including a picture disc bundle) followed in February and April 2019. The soundtrack became the sixth-best-selling album of 2019.

== Release ==
The world premiere of Bohemian Rhapsody took place in London at Wembley Arena, on 23 October 2018. It was released in the United Kingdom on 24 October 2018 in IMAX, and in the United States on 2 November 2018, by 20th Century Fox. The film had previously been scheduled for release on 25 December 2018. In November 2018, John Ottman announced in an interview that an extended version of the film with cut-out scenes may be released, in a yet unknown format. On 1 January 2019, it was announced that there would be special sing-along screenings simultaneously in cinemas across the United Kingdom with the first screening at Leicester Square's Prince Charles Cinema with others on 11 January 2019. There were also many sing-along screenings in South Korea and Japan.

In China, the film had a limited release on 22 March 2019. Three minutes of the film was censored, including scenes depicting drugs and homosexuality. Part of Rami Malek's Oscar speech, where he referred to Freddie Mercury as "a gay man, an immigrant," was also censored in China.

In Egypt, the film was subjected to several cuts before it was permitted to be screened. As Rami Malek is of Egyptian descent, his Oscar win for his portrayal of Freddie Mercury drew congratulations from Egyptian media and government figures. However, Neela Ghoshal of Human Rights Watch stated that the country deserved "an Oscar for hypocrisy" given its prohibition on homosexuals appearing in the media. Member of Parliament Mohamed Ismail criticised Malek's win, stating: "He is trying to [spread] homosexuality among the youth... The award has a specific goal, which is to corrupt morality in the Arab world. Rami Malek is a bad example. If he was in Egypt, he would have been hanged."

=== Home media ===
20th Century Fox Home Entertainment released the film in the United States on DVD, Blu-ray and Ultra HD Blu-ray on 19 February 2019; with a digital version released 22 January. The UK digital release was scheduled for 23 February 2019, with DVD and Blu-ray/4K Ultra HD on 18 March 2019. The home release includes an extended version of the Live Aid sequence, a 16-minute featurette, a 22-minute documentary, and trailers.

In the United Kingdom, it surpassed Avengers: Infinity War to become the fastest-selling digital download film of all time, selling 265,000 downloads in eight days. It also set the record for the biggest debut on physical disc formats, selling 465,000 discs in its first week. It went on to sell 853,000 units in four weeks, including 388,600 digital sales.

In the United States, 73% of unit sales in the first week were on Blu-ray Disc, with 13% from the 4K Ultra HD Blu-ray version. Home video sales in the United States and Canada are estimated to have generated over $49.6 million as of 6 December 2019, including $19,333,115 in DVD sales and $41,562,971 in Blu-ray sales.

Chart (2019)	Peak position	Ref.
Official Irish Video Chart (OCC)	1	
UK Official Film Chart (OCC)	1	
UK Official Film on Disc Chart (OCC)	1	
US NPD VideoScan First Alert (Nielsen)	1	
US Blu-ray Disc sales chart (Nielsen)	1	

=== Marketing ===
The first trailer for the film was released on 15 May 2018 and with more than 5 million views in the first 24 hours, it was the top trending video on YouTube. Television writer and producer Bryan Fuller criticized the trailer for focusing on Mercury's relationship with women as opposed to men, and also highlighted the absence of the singer's AIDS diagnosis from the synopsis. Instead, it is simply referred to as "a life-threatening illness". With the release of the trailer, Queen reached three of the top 20 positions on the Billboard Hot Rock Songs chart: "Bohemian Rhapsody", "Another One Bites the Dust" and "We Are the Champions". In total, the studio spent $121 million promoting the film.

On 11 June 2018, at CineEurope in Barcelona, an early showing of the film closed the show, with appearances by Rami Malek and producer Graham King and special appearances by Brian May and Roger Taylor, who were playing a concert of Queen + Adam Lambert in Barcelona.

== Reception ==
=== Box office ===
Bohemian Rhapsody grossed $216.7 million in the United States and Canada, and $694.4 million in other territories, for a total worldwide gross of $911.1 million, against a production budget of about $52 million. On 11 November, it surpassed Straight Outta Compton ($201.6 million) to become the highest-grossing musical biopic of all time; it was surpassed by Michael in 2026. Bohemian Rhapsody went on to set box office records for the highest-grossing biographical film until Oppenheimer (2023), (Note: Attributed to multiple references:) and the highest-grossing LGBT film. It also set the record for the highest-grossing conventional drama film; it was surpassed by Joker in 2019. It is Fox's fourth highest-grossing film, and its fifth highest outside of North America.

Deadline Hollywood calculated the net profit of the film to be $350.8 million, when factoring together all expenses and revenue, making it the fourth most profitable release of 2018. However, in November 2021, after McCarten sued producer Graham King over lack of payments, it was revealed 20th Century Fox wrote down the film as a $51 million loss, an act attributed to Hollywood accounting.

==== United Kingdom ====
In the United Kingdom, the film had preview screenings on its opening night of 24 October 2018, grossing £1.62 million ($2.22 million) from 575 venues, with a per-screen average of £2,817 ($3,859). It went on to gross $12.5 million from 1,250 screens in its opening weekend, finishing first at the box office. It grossed another $7.4 million in its second weekend, remaining at number-one and grossing £20.4 million ($27.95 million) through 12 days.

==== United States and Canada ====
In the United States and Canada, Bohemian Rhapsody was released alongside The Nutcracker and the Four Realms and Nobody's Fool, and was originally projected to gross $26–30 million in its opening weekend. By the week of its release, weekend estimates had reached $35–40 million. It made $18.4 million on its first day, including $3.9 million from Thursday night previews. It went on to debut to $51.1 million, topping the box office and marking the second-best opening for a musical biographical picture, behind Straight Outta Compton ($60.2 million in August 2015). The film made $31.2 million in its second weekend, finishing second, behind newcomer The Grinch, and $15.7 million in its third, finishing behind Fantastic Beasts: The Crimes of Grindelwald and The Grinch.

In its fourth weekend the film made $13.8 million, and $19.3 million over the five-day Thanksgiving frame, finishing fifth. On 1 December, it passed $162 million at the domestic box office, surpassing Straight Outta Compton as the highest grossing musical biopic in the United States. In its 10th weekend of release the film was added to 199 theatres over the previous week for a total of 1,080, and made $2.4 million. In its 12th weekend of release the film made $2.3 million from 1,117 theatres, crossing the $200 million mark. In the film's 13th week of release, following the announcement of its five Oscar nominations, it was added back to an additional 246 theatres (for a total of 1,423) and made $2.6 million.

==== Other territories ====
In its second weekend of international release, the film topped the worldwide box office, grossing $72.5 million in international markets. New markets included France ($7.7 million), Mexico ($5.8 million), Germany ($5.7 million) and Australia ($5.7 million). By its fourth weekend the film was still holding strong, adding an additional $45.5 million from 78 markets, for a running total of $256.4 million. Through four weekends of international release, the film's largest markets were the UK ($45.3 million, passing La La Land), followed by South Korea ($24.5 million), France ($18.38 million), Australia ($16.8 million) and Mexico ($15.5 million). On 12 December, the film surpassed $433 million at the international box office, becoming the highest-grossing musical biopic ever overseas.

The film became the biggest 2018 release in 13 international markets, including Japan ($88.6 million), Italy ($30.5 million) and the Netherlands ($19.3 million), as of 20 January 2019. The film's largest overseas markets were in East Asia, with the largest-grossing market being Japan, where it became the highest-grossing film of 2018. The film crossed 7 million tickets sold and ¥10 billion grossed at the Japanese box office, with the IMAX version crossing ¥1 billion, becoming the highest-grossing IMAX release ever in Japan. It also crossed $115 million there, and is the highest-grossing live-action musical film in Japan, passing Beauty and the Beast (2017). As of 31 March 2019, Bohemian Rhapsody has sold 9,220,250 tickets and grossed ¥12,739,285,680 in Japan.

In South Korea, the film debuted at number two at the box office and by the fourth week took over the number one spot. After a short drop for two weeks, the film reclaimed the number one spot in its seventh week, which is a first for a Hollywood film. As the second-largest grossing market outside of North America, the film has amassed $74 million, as of 1 February 2019, and has become the sixth highest-grossing foreign film ever in South Korea, with nearly 10 million tickets sold. It is the most successful musical film ever released in South Korea.

The film grossed $29.4 million in Spain, $16.4 million in Russia and $14.4 million in Brazil, as of 3 February 2019. In China, where the film received an art house release after having its content edited, it debuted to $11.6 million, setting the all-time record for a National Alliance of Arthouse Cinemas release.

=== Critical response ===
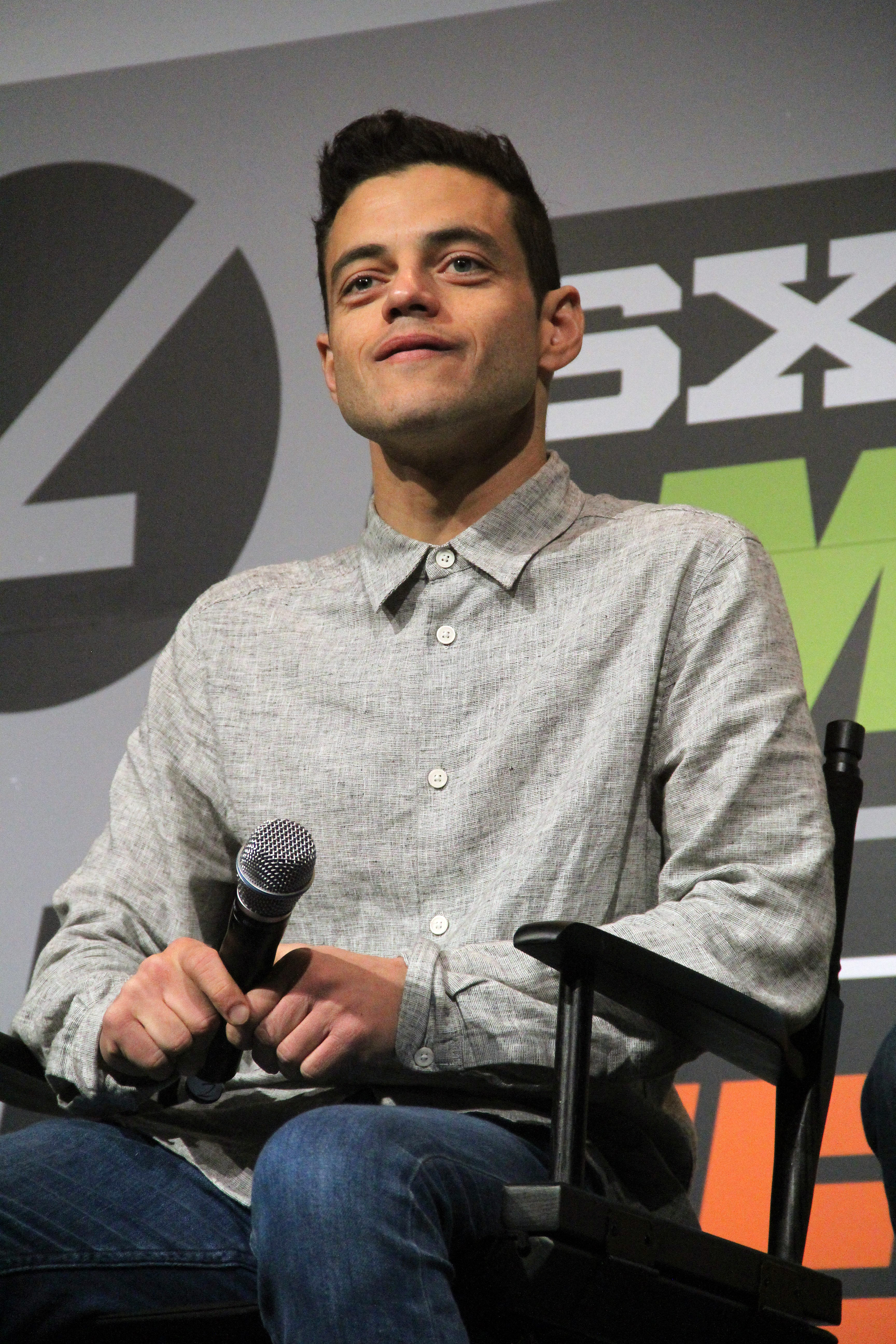
Rami Malek's performance as Freddie Mercury garnered critical acclaim, earning him the Academy Award for Best Actor.

On review aggregator Rotten Tomatoes, the film holds an approval rating of 60% based on 419 reviews, and an average rating of 6.1/10. The website's critical consensus reads: "Bohemian Rhapsody hits a handful of high notes, but as an in-depth look at a beloved band, it offers more of a medley than a true greatest hits collection." On Metacritic, the film has a weighted average score of 49 out of 100, based on 50 critics, indicating "mixed or average" reviews. Audiences polled by CinemaScore gave the film an average grade of "A" on an A+ to F scale, while PostTrak reported filmgoers gave it an 88% positive score and a 75% "definite recommend". The critical response to Bohemian Rhapsody made it one of the worst-reviewed films to win a Best Picture award at the Golden Globe Awards (lowest Rotten Tomatoes score since Out of Africa in 1986—60% compared to Bohemian Rhapsody's 62% at the time of the awards), or to be nominated for Best Picture at the Academy Awards (lowest Rotten Tomatoes score since Extremely Loud & Incredibly Close in 2012—46% at the time of the awards).

Owen Gleiberman of Variety wrote: "Rami Malek does a commanding job of channeling Freddie Mercury's flamboyant rock-god bravura, but Bryan Singer's middle-of-the-road Queen biopic rarely lives up to the authenticity of its lead performance." Paul Whitington, writing for the Irish Independent, gave the film 3/5 stars, saying: "Bohemian Rhapsody is not big on subtlety: it tells Freddie's story loudly, taking dramatic shortcuts, over-neatly conflating events and reducing most of the surrounding characters to single dimensions. Some of the dialogue's a bit heavy-handed too, but I must say I was thoroughly entertained."

For the Evening Standard, Craig McLean wrote: "Bohemian Rhapsody is triumphant entertainment. The post-production special effects have done their job: the Live Aid scenes are convincingly epic. The actors have done their job, too, notably Malek, who oozes pure Mercury." For Time, Stephanie Zacharek wrote: "In strict filmmaking terms, Bohemian Rhapsody is a bit of a mess. Some of its scenes connect awkwardly, and it hits every beat of disaster and triumphs squarely, like a gong. Yet if it has many of the problems we associate with 'bad' movies, it has more ragged energy than so many good ones, largely because of Rami Malek's performance as Mercury, all glitter and muscle and nerve endings." She described it as "a movie for sensualists, not quality-control experts".

Chief Guardian pop critic Alexis Petridis described the portrayal of Mercury as "sanitized", writing: "Bohemian Rhapsody is a film that plays so fast and loose with the truth, it ends up seeming faintly ridiculous: you start out nitpicking about minor chronological errors... and end up with your jaw on the floor." Guardian film critic Steve Rose described it as a "rock slog with a troubling moralistic subtext". Although he praised Malek's performance, David Ehrlich of IndieWire gave the film a grade of "D+", criticising Singer's direction and calling the film "royally embarrassing". He wrote: "Queen's music may have been unclassifiable, but their movie is as trite and textbook as it gets." He described the film as a "terrible and self-indulgent piece of revisionist history, where the legend is always prioritized over the truth, even when the truth was surely far more interesting."

For The Spectator, Jasper Rees described Bohemian Rhapsody as "a succession of predigested clichés", writing "you are overcome by the sapping impression that almost nothing happened the way it's being presented." He concluded: "The costumes and wigs are splendid, and the songs are still up to snuff. But this homage to a showman is more famine than feast." Olly Richards wrote for Empire that the film was "a safe, competent, decidedly non-scandalous biopic. It treats the life of Freddie Mercury with cautious affection, happy to play within the rules when depicting a man who did anything but." However, he described Malek as "spectacular", concluding: "If the script hits a lot of bum notes, Malek is always perfectly in key." Peter Travers of Rolling Stone wrote: "In struggling to make a salable PG-13 movie out of an R-rated rock life, Bohemian Rhapsody leaves you feeling that something essential and elemental is missing", but said to put Malek "high on the list for best film performances of 2018," as the actor "digs so deep into the role that we can't believe we're not watching the real thing."

Dave Calhoun wrote for Time Out: "It boasts a film-stealing, possessed performance by Rami Malek, who pouts, struts and quips as Mercury, turning the rest of the cast into bit-part players... The movie, though catchy and often seductive, is an act of brazen myth-making. Facts and chronology are tossed aside in favor of a messianic storyline... Much is left out, or fiddled with." He added, "don't expect anything more than a safe gloss over the Queen tale... its attitude toward sex and drugs is coy and uncomfortably close to the small-world thinking it claims to dismiss." Despite calling the film "uneven," Chicago Tribune film critic Katie Walsh stated: "Malek keeps it going with his sheer will and talent." In a negative review, Soumya Srivastava of the Hindustan Times still asserted that the character was "played to a toothy perfection by Rami Malek." Johnny Oleksinski of the New York Post was less impressed with Malek's performance, writing: "It's a surface-level performance — physically galvanizing, but with no substance."

The film received criticism for its portrayal of Mercury's gay relationships. Aja Romano wrote for Vox: "Bohemian Rhapsody is a movie that consciously tries to position a gay man at its center while strategically disengaging with the 'gay' part as much as it can, flitting briefly over his emotional and sexual experiences and fixating on his platonic relationship with an ex-girlfriend instead." Likewise, Olly Richards wrote: "There are some poor, strange choices when deciding where to focus, not least committing so much time to his relationship with Mary Austin and virtually none to any happy gay relationship, romantic or otherwise." Owen Gleiberman wrote that the film "treats Freddie's life – his sexual-romantic identity, his loneliness, his reckless adventures in gay leather clubs – with kid-gloves reticence, so that even if the film isn't telling major lies, you don't feel you're fully touching the real story either."

Brian May responded to the critical reviews by stating that the "mistake that critics made was reviewing the trailer instead of reviewing the film. They jumped to conclusions. Once people stake their claim, it's hard for them to withdraw." Fraser Nelson, editor of The Spectator, wrote: "Don't believe the critics. If you like Queen's music, see the Queen film," and he likened the critics' negative reaction to the film to the original reaction to the song "Bohemian Rhapsody" and the popular musical We Will Rock You. Also writing for The Spectator, Toby Young described the film's success at the Academy Awards as "a triumph over snobby film critics".

=== Accolades ===
The film, which has received multiple awards and nominations, won four awards at the 91st Academy Awards for Best Actor (Rami Malek), Best Film Editing, Best Sound Editing and Best Sound Mixing, making it the film with the most wins at the ceremony; it was also nominated for Best Picture, which it lost to Green Book. At the 76th Golden Globe Awards, the film was nominated for Best Actor – Motion Picture Drama and Best Motion Picture – Drama, winning both. At the 72nd British Academy Film Awards, the film received seven nominations, winning for Best Actor in a Leading Role and Best Sound. The film was also nominated for Best Theatrical Motion Picture at the 30th annual Producers Guild of America Awards, and received an award for Outstanding Performance by a Male Actor in a Leading Role at the 25th Screen Actors Guild Awards.

In the wake of the renewed sexual abuse allegations against director Bryan Singer, GLAAD withdrew Bohemian Rhapsody's nomination for the year's GLAAD Media Award in the Outstanding Film – Wide Release category. On 6 February 2019, the British Academy of Film and Television Arts removed Singer's name from Bohemian Rhapsody's nomination for the BAFTA Award for Best British Film.

When the film was nominated and won awards for Best Editing, several sequences, in particular the scene where the band first meets John Reid, were criticised online for poor editing and continuity errors. Editor John Ottman, aware of these lapses, explained that they were the result of mixing scenes that had been shot by Singer and Fletcher, as well as in response to the producers' notes and test audience feedback, wishing that he could have handled them differently.

== Historical accuracy ==
The film was criticized for its extensive use of creative license with respect to the band's career and Mercury's personal life. The visual blog Information Is Beautiful deduced that, while taking creative licence into account, the film was 79.9% accurate when compared to real-life events, calling it "a fairly truthful account represented in a massively compressed [and] edited timeline" and suggested the fictionalised elements were "probably symbolic of the band's constant infighting."

=== Regarding the band ===
- The formation of Queen was not as simple as portrayed in the film. Mercury had known Tim Staffell, Smile's lead singer and bassist, from art college, and had expressed interest in joining the band prior to Staffell's departure. Additionally, Smile had more than three members. Mercury also shared a flat with Roger Taylor prior to joining the band, and had run a stall at the Kensington Market with him.
- Deacon was not the original bassist, but the fourth.
- During the recording session scene for "Bohemian Rhapsody", all four band members are shown recording overdub vocals, though Deacon did not sing backing vocals on the recorded version of the song.
- The character of Foster is fictional, and is loosely based on EMI chief Roy Featherstone, who was actually a fan of the band. Although Featherstone and others initially refused to release "Bohemian Rhapsody" as a single due to its length, the label eventually agreed to release it as the lead single from A Night at the Opera due to public demand, which was in fact the result of airplay by Kenny Everett as depicted in the film. Queen had in fact been signed with EMI since the release of their debut album in 1973, and remained with the label for the remainder of their career.
- Some songs are shown out of chronological order with respect to the band's career. For example, "We Will Rock You" was written in 1977, not in 1980 as depicted in the film. As well, "Another One Bites the Dust" was written and released in 1980, but in the film it is shown being made in 1981. The band is shown performing "Fat Bottomed Girls" during their first US tour in 1974, but that song was not written until 1978.
- Reid was not fired as Queen's manager after an argument with Mercury over his solo career as portrayed in the film. The band and Reid parted amicably in 1978 by mutual agreement and for different reasons.
- The Rio de Janeiro concert did not take place in 1979, but during the first Rock in Rio festival in January 1985 (thus approximately six months before Live Aid); the live version for "Love of My Life" used in the film is taken from the 1985 Rio concert, and labelled as such in the accompanying official soundtrack for the film.
- Mercury's solo career was not a cause of resentment in the band. His solo debut album, Mr. Bad Guy, was released in April 1985. Prior to this, Taylor had released the single "(I Wanna) Testify" in August 1977, and the albums Fun in Space and Strange Frontier in April 1981 and June 1984, respectively. May had released the EP Star Fleet Project in October 1983.
- Although not explicitly claimed in the film, Queen never disbanded during Mercury's lifetime, so Live Aid was not a reunion.
- Queen did not start assigning songwriting credits to the whole band in 1985 before Live Aid; their 1986 album A Kind of Magic still had individual writing credits. The only Queen albums which credit the band as a whole are The Miracle (1989) and Innuendo (1991).
- Queen did not have any major concerns about performing at Live Aid, nor were they a last-minute addition. They had released the album The Works in 1984 and then toured worldwide. The final show of the tour was eight weeks before Live Aid. They were "extremely well-rehearsed" for the show and did not have to get back into shape as a band.
- Queen performed "Crazy Little Thing Called Love" and "We Will Rock You" at Live Aid, after "Hammer to Fall" and before "We Are the Champions", but this is not shown in the theatrical release of the film. "Radio Ga Ga" and "Hammer to Fall" were also shorter in the film than in the real concert. (Note: The cast re-enacted the entire performance, but it was edited down significantly in post-production. The full re-enacted performance is included on the home media release.)
- In a scene that did not appear in the film but was briefly shown in a trailer, Gwilym Lee as May and Joseph Mazzello as Deacon are seen playing their guitars with a bow, which May himself claims to have never done.

=== Regarding Mercury's personal life ===
- The backstory of Mercury's family was not as dramatic as portrayed in the film. The family were not forced to flee their hometown in Zanzibar but were given six months to move to Middlesex. The film also suggests that Mercury was sent to boarding school because of his behaviour, and portrays his indifference to his Parsi background and decision to change his name as a source of tension with his family. Mercury's mother Jer claimed in a 2012 interview with The Daily Telegraph that Mercury was sent to boarding school in India in hope for a better education; Mercury "kept a strict division between his work and his home all his life", and throughout his upbringing and adulthood was known to be respectful towards his family. May also stated that Mercury's parents were ultimately supportive of the band and would attend Queen's concerts if they were performing nearby. Both Jer and Mercury's sister Kashmira also claimed that while Mercury was not devoutly religious and preferred not to disclose his beliefs with the media, he was proud of his ancestry in private.
- According to Vanity Fair, the film leaves out many details about Mercury's relationships with Austin and Hutton, "tweaking and glossing over precious facts".
- Mercury did not meet Austin on the same night he joined the band. Austin had briefly dated May, but did not meet Mercury until he was already a band member.
- Hutton was not a server at one of Mercury's parties; he was a hairdresser at the Savoy Hotel who met Mercury at a nightclub. They first met in 1983 and not in 1981, as portrayed in the film.
- The film's treatment of Mercury's HIV diagnosis received particular criticism, with Jasper Rees describing it in The Spectator as "the most callous rearrangement of the facts". Although Mercury suspected he had HIV in 1983, he was not officially diagnosed until 1987, two years after Live Aid. Taylor said that the other band members were not made aware of his condition until early 1989.
- The portrayal of Paul Prenter was also met with some debate. Both May and Taylor have said that Prenter's partnership with Mercury was a source of friction within Queen. In his book Queen 3-D, May wrote, "He [Prenter] was certainly responsible for leading Freddie off on a different path, and it would be fair to say that we parted on terms that were less than good." Taylor said in the Queen documentary Days of our Lives that "He [Prenter] was a very, very bad influence upon Freddie, hence on the band." However, Prenter's family have said that he and Mercury were never in a relationship; that he was not disowned by his family for his sexuality; and that he did not withhold details concerning Live Aid from Mercury. In real life, Prenter did not work for Reid; he was a former radio DJ who became Mercury's PA in 1977, two years after the release of A Night at the Opera. He also did not disclose details of Mercury's sex life on a German talk show, but in a 1987 interview for The Sun newspaper after he no longer worked for the band. According to Mark Blake's book Is This the Real Life?, Queen roadie Peter Hince claimed that Prenter was fired for holding a party in Mercury's home without permission.

== Possible sequel ==
In August 2021, guitarist Brian May revealed that there were ideas being thrown around for a sequel to Bohemian Rhapsody, though it would be a matter of topping the original and could possibly take years to get the screenplay right.
