= Waiting on You =

Waiting on You may refer to:

- "Waiting on You" (Ultra Naté and Michelle Williams song), 2012
- "Waiting on You" (Charlie Major song), 1996
- "Waiting on You" (Lindsay Ell song), 2017
- ...Waiting on You, a 1974 album by Jonathan Kelly's Outside
- "Waiting on You", a 2026 song by Rick Astley
