= Nova Solis =

Studio album by Morgan
- Released: 1972
- Recorded: 1972
- Studios: RCA Studios, Rome, Italy
- Genres: Rock, progressive rock
- Length: 40:54
- Labels: UK: RCA Victor SF 8321; Italy: RCA Victor LISP 34154; Japan: RCA CR-10067 (1988); UK CD: Angel Air SJPCD 067 (2000); Italy LP: Black Widow BWR 052 (2001)
- Producers: Morgan, Gianni Grandis

Morgan chronology
Nova Solis (1972)	The Sleeper Wakes (1973)

Nova Solis is rock band Morgan's first album, released in 1972.

== Track listing ==
All tracks composed by Morgan Fisher (music) and Tim Staffell (lyrics), apart from "Alone" (music and lyrics by Staffell); "Nova Solis" - a side-length suite - includes "Jupiter" (excerpt; by Gustav Holst) and "May I Remember" and "Earth" (music and lyrics by Staffell) by Staffell's earlier band, Smile.

1. "Samarkhand the Golden" - 8:05
2. "Alone" - 5:20
3. "War Games" - 7:05
4. "Nova Solis" - 20:24
  - "Theme"
  - "Floating"
  - "Take-Off"
  - "Asteroids"
  - "Earth"
  - "Hyperspace: The Return Home"
  - "Nova"
  - "May I Remember"
  - "Theme"

== Personnel ==
Morgan

- Morgan Fisher - organ, electric and acoustic pianos, synthesizers, Mellotron, spinet, finger cymbals
- Tim Staffell - vocals, acoustic guitar, tambourine, timpani
- Bob Sapsed - fretless bass
- Maurice Bacon - drums, percussion, gong

Professional ratings
Review scores
Source	Rating
AllMusic	2.5/5 stars
