= Jonathan Kelly =

Irish folk rock singer-songwriter (1947–2020)

- Born: Jonathan Ledingham; 8 July 1947; Drogheda, County Louth, Ireland
- Died: 2 May 2020 (aged 72)
- Genres: Folk rock
- Occupation: Singer-songwriter
- Years active: Mid-1960s–1976; 2004–2007
- Website: Official website

Jonathan Kelly (born Jonathan Ledingham, 8 July 1947 – 2 May 2020) was an Irish folk rock singer-songwriter, who enjoyed a varied career in music, playing with many musicians and groups, including Eric Clapton and Tim Staffell. He formed Jonathan Kelly's Outside in 1973.

== Biography ==
Born in Drogheda, County Louth, he attended Drogheda Grammar School. He played bass guitar for Humpy Bong which featured former Bee Gees drummer Colin Petersen. The band did not progress but released one single, "Don't You Be Too Long". Kelly would then retain Petersen as his manager and release two albums through RCA, Twice Around the Houses and Wait til They Change the Backdrop.

Outside was made up of Kelly, Snowy White and Chas Jankel on guitars, Dave Sheen on drums and Trevor Williams (ex-Audience) on bass guitar. White went on to play with Pink Floyd and Thin Lizzy before a successful solo career, and Jankel later played with Ian Dury and the Blockheads. One album was recorded, ...Waiting On You, in 1974, with an accompanying single "...Waiting On You"/"Outside", before the band members went their separate ways.

Kelly stopped performing in 1976. However, between 2004 and 2007, he returned to performing a few solo acoustic concerts at small venues.

== Death ==
Kelly died on 2 May 2020, after a long illness.

== Discography ==
=== Albums ===
- Jonathan Kelly: LP Jonathan Kelly (Parlophone PCS 7114) – (1970)
- Jonathan Kelly: LP Twice Around The Houses (RCA SF 8262) – (1972)
- Jonathan Kelly: LP Wait Till They Change The Backdrop (RCA SF 8353) – (1973)
- as Jonathan Kelly's Outside: LP ...Waiting On You (RCA LPL 15022) – (1974)
- Jonathan Kelly: LP Two Days In Winter (RCA SF 8415) – (1975)

=== Singles ===
- as The Boomerangs: 7" single "Dream World" / "Upgraded" (Pye 7N 17049) – (1966)
- as Jon Ledingham: 7" single "Without An E" / "She's Got Me" (Pye 7N 17422) – (1967)
- as Jon Ledingham: 7" single "Love Is A Toy" / "Thank You Mrs. Gilbert" (Pye 7N 17488) – (1968)
- Jonathan Kelly: 7" single "Denver" / "Son John" (Parlophone R 5805) – (1969)
- Jonathan Kelly: 7" single "Make A Stranger Your Friend" / "Daddy Don't Take Me Down Fishing No More" (Parlophone R 5830) – (1970)
- Jonathan Kelly: 7" single "Don't You Believe It" / "Billy" (Parlophone R 5851) – (1970)
- as Humpy Bong: 7" single "Don't You Be Too Long" / "We're Alright 'Til Then" (Parlophone R 5859) – (1970)
- Jonathan Kelly: 7" single "Madeleine" / "Sligo Fair" (RCA 2223) – (1972)
- Jonathan Kelly: 7" single "Let The People Stay" / "Mother Moon" (RCA 2370) – (1973)
- as Jonathan Kelly's Outside: 7" single "...Waiting On You" / "Outside" (RCA LPBO 5030) – (1974)
