= Desert Saints =

- Desert Saints
- Directed by: Richard Greenberg
- Written by: Richard Greenberg; Wally Nichols
- Produced by: Meg Ryan; Graham King; Nina R. Sadowsky; David Yudain
- Starring: Kiefer Sutherland; Melora Walters; Jamey Sheridan
- Cinematography: John Newby
- Edited by: Andy Blumenthal
- Music by: Richard Marvin
- Production companies: Initial Entertainment Group; City Heat Productions; Prufrock Pictures/Sagg Main Productions
- Distributed by: Artisan Entertainment (United States); Initial Entertainment Group (Overseas)
- Release date: March 10, 2002
- Running time: 88 minutes
- Country: United States
- Language: English

Desert Saints is a 2002 crime thriller film starring Kiefer Sutherland as a hitman named Arthur Banks, with Melora Walters as Agent Bennie Harper. The film is produced by Meg Ryan.

== Plot ==
Arthur Banks (Kiefer Sutherland) is an Ivy League-educated hitman for Latin American drug cartels who picks up solitary women, uses them as cover for a hit, then kills them. His trademark is a bullet with a tungsten core. Over the years, he has become wary of the FBI's attempts to catch him, including by use of satellite and security cameras, which leads him to mostly stay in rural desert areas when he is not working. The FBI team is spearheaded by Agent George Scanlon (Jamey Sheridan), who lost five years of his career when Banks killed a witness he was guarding 15 years ago while leaving no evidence behind. In a desperation sting, Scanlon plants Agent Bennie Harper (Melora Walters), portraying a drifter, in Bank's path, and Banks picks her up for what he says will be his last job, a hit on a Mexican presidential candidate. Scanlon and Agent Donna Marbury (Leslie Stefanson), along with several support agents, follow Banks and Harper through the Southwest, but the scheme goes wrong when one of the tailing agents is spotted and caught by Banks.

Thinking quickly, the agent pretends to be Harper's jealous and abusive ex-husband, but this plan goes awry when Banks, who seems more interested in Harper than normal, kills the agent outside of Harper's sight and then disposes of the body in a manner not witnessed by Harper (incineration), leaving the FBI once again with no evidence to arrest him. That night, Banks and Harper become lovers at a remote motel. Scanlon decides to cancel the sting after the agent's death and to withdraw Harper, but Harper talks him out of it, pointing out that Banks is their only lead to his employers in the drug cartels. On the road, Banks confides to Harper that he hates his job but hasn't had a chance to get out of it for years until then

In Mexico, Harper double-crosses both Banks and the FBI, first shooting Banks to stop him from committing the assassination and then handcuffing him to the balcony, but then killing the thugs who hired Banks and taking their key to the payoff from the hit. She tells Banks that she expects the FBI will be so happy to catch and question him that she'll depart with the payoff without much problem, which is why she leaves him alive. However, by the time Scanlon responds to her call on Bank's location, he has escaped. Meanwhile, the FBI agents follow Agent Marbury's sighting of a fleeing Harper to the local airport, only to lose her there, because the "sighting" was actually Marbury herself in a disguise, which she sheds in a washroom, permitting Harper's undetected escape.

In the last scene, Harper and Marbury meet in the desert and kiss, while discussing their new wealth. In the distant brush, we see Banks' boots and bloody hand, unnoticed by the two women. After the screen goes black, we hear a single shot.

== Cast ==
- Kiefer Sutherland as Arthur Banks
- Melora Walters as FBI Agent Bennie Harper
- Jamey Sheridan as FBI Agent George Scanlon
- Leslie Stefanson as FBI Agent Donna Marbury
- Alan Gelfant as FBI Agent Byron Sadowski
- Keith Diamond as FBI Agent Robinson
- Rachel Ticotin as Dora
- Jim Jenkins as Anchorman
- Bill Sage as FBI Agent Davis
- Alex Black as Bobbie
- Beth Grant as Lou
- Brent Roam as Concierge
- Shawn Woods as Larson
- Gloria Alexandra as Maria Lopez
- Aliza Rajan as FBI Agent McCoy

== Home media ==
The DVD was released September 17, 2002. The film is also available for purchase on Amazon digital.
