= Humpy Bong =

English folk rock band

- Origin: London, England
- Genres: Rock; folk rock
- Years active: 1970
- Label: Parlophone
- Past members: Colin Petersen; Jonathan Kelly; Tim Staffell

Humpy Bong were an English folk rock band formed in London in 1970, by former Bee Gees drummer Colin Petersen and Irish folk rock singer Jonathan Kelly.

== Beginnings ==
Colin Petersen was a child actor in Australia and drummer with the Bee Gees. Jonathan Kelly was playing in a restaurant in London one night in 1969, when in walked Colin. Petersen said, "I knew when I saw and heard him that this was a talent which should be encouraged and developed". Colin became his record producer and Colin's wife Joanne became his personal manager. Kelly released a single in 1969 called "Denver", and another single in February 1970 called "Make A Stranger Your Friend", an anti-war song. This song had a catchy chorus and Jonathan's talents were recognised by many people in show business if not yet by the record buying public at large. A choir was formed to sing the chorus, amongst those who turned up to join in were Mick Taylor from The Rolling Stones, Klaus Voormann, Madeline Bell, Carl Wayne, Peter Sellers and Spike Milligan. Robin Gibb also attended the session but was contractually prevented from singing. Jonathan Kelly's next single in 1970 was "Don't You Believe It", a very sought-after single because Eric Clapton was invited to play slide guitar on the track.

In the summer of 1970, Petersen and Kelly decided to form a band together. They called their band Humpy Bong, a two-word variation of Humpybong State School, one of the schools that Petersen and the Gibb brothers attended in Australia. As they needed additional band members, they placed an advertisement in search of musicians. Tim Staffell, previously bassist/frontman for Smile (which following Staffell's departure replaced him with his college friend Freddie Mercury and evolved into Queen), answered and got the job as singer, bassist and harmonica player. The trio of Kelly, Staffell and Petersen quickly recorded and released "Don't You Be Too Long" backed with "We're All Right Till Then". Jonathan Kelly was the writer of both tracks and played guitar, but the vocal duties were taken by Tim Staffell, and within a month or so of leaving Smile, Staffell appeared on Top of the Pops to mime to Humpy Bong's one and only single. The A side would appear on Jonathan's first album, simply titled Jonathan Kelly (November 1970), which included many of his singles as well as other unreleased songs, but there would be a wait of two years for the B side to finally reappear on the Twice Around The Houses LP (1972), but both of these tracks were completely different versions to the ones that appeared on this single.

== Live performances ==
According to an interview with Colin Petersen at the time, the group was unable to play any live gigs until they added two new members. The spectre of Colin's Bee Gees past was making the task of recruitment even harder. "I've just auditioned my 200th applicant" he groaned. "People are assuming the new group will be a carbon copy of the Bee Gees. I must have heard "Massachusetts" 50 times. I am still looking for a good lead guitarist and a pianist to finish the line-up", Colin said. "We can record with the three of us by double-tracking, but we can't appear on stage. Live radio shows are also a problem..."

For a second Top of the Pops appearance, the band played a song called "Don't You Believe It". This was actually a Jonathan Kelly solo single released shortly before Humpy Bong got together. The single had featured Eric Clapton on lead guitar – but Clapton was unavailable for the Top of the Pops appearance so Staffell played the lead guitar parts. Remembers Staffell: "I struggled to duplicate a guitar part that Eric Clapton had played, because we had to re-record it for Top Of The Pops, you weren't allowed to mime, and Eric Clapton couldn't make the session. I was in a bit of a shambles, I can tell you". Before the end of 1970 the group broke up without having played any real concerts. Staffell remembers: "As I recall, it went like this – Colin Petersen played drums, I played bass at first, but was crap, so we used, I think, Rick Kemp from Steeleye Span a couple of times. Jonathan Kelly played guitar and wrote the songs, and I have an idea that Tim Renwick from Quiver might have played lead once or twice, and we had Peter Wood on keyboards (Quiver, Sutherland Brothers). Actually, there was never really a firm band. Humpy Bong never did a single gig, anyway, so I guess they weren't really a proper band." Humpy Bong was basically a front for the management and production aspirations of Petersen and his wife. They hand-picked the group and attempted to shape it into a bubbly hit machine, but their lively but superficial honkytonk pop was indistinct and the band fell apart within a few months.

== Breakup ==
Tim Staffell remained associated with Jonathan Kelly and later became a member of Jonathan's band Outside. Staffell moved on to Morgan, a progressive rock quartet led by former Love Affair (and later Mott The Hoople) organist Morgan Fisher, which recorded for RCA Italy in 1972 and 1973. He finally left music in the late 1970s to concentrate on a flourishing business as a freelance animator and model maker – his work includes Thomas the Tank Engine.

Colin and Joanne Petersen continued to manage Jonathan Kelly as a solo artist through to his third LP release, Til They Change The Backdrop (1973), but Colin had no musical involvement in Kelly's solo albums. Kelly became unhappy with attempts to market him as a pop star and tired of the "totally ruthless and callous" music industry. He parted company with the Petersens in 1974, recorded two further albums, found religion, and retired from performing for many, many years. In 1991, Jonathan Kelly performed at a Bee Gees tribute concert and formed a cover band for the occasion which included his son Greg on lead guitar; Jonathan played drums.

Colin and Joanne Petersen returned to Australia in 1974 where Colin, having lost his rights to royalties after his court case against the Bee Gees, eventually became a painter residing in Sydney.

== Members ==
- Colin Petersen – drums, percussion, producer and manager
- Jonathan Kelly – vocals, guitar, songwriter
- Tim Staffell – vocals, bass, harmonica

== Recordings ==
- 7" "Don't You Be Too Long" (Kelly) b/w "We're All Right Till Then" (Kelly) (Parlophone R 5859, 21 August 1970). Produced by Colin Peterson.

Top of the Pops performances were recorded for both "Don't You Be Too Long" and "Don't You Believe It" – which was in fact a Jonathan Kelly solo single released shortly before Humpy Bong formed. Both performance tapes are presumed destroyed.
