= The Unforgivable =

2021 drama film by Nora Fingscheidt

- Promotional release poster
- Directed by: Nora Fingscheidt
- Screenplay by: Peter Craig; Hillary Seitz; Courtenay Miles
- Based on: Unforgiven by Sally Wainwright
- Produced by: Graham King; Sandra Bullock; Veronica Ferres
- Starring: Sandra Bullock; Vincent D'Onofrio; Jon Bernthal; Richard Thomas; Linda Emond; Aisling Franciosi; Rob Morgan; Viola Davis
- Cinematography: Guillermo Navarro
- Edited by: Joe Walker; Stephan Bechinger
- Music by: Hans Zimmer; David Fleming
- Production companies: GK Films; Fortis Films; Construction Film; Red Production Company
- Distributed by: Netflix
- Release date: November 24, 2021 (United States)
- Running time: 112 minutes
- Countries: United States; United Kingdom; Germany
- Language: English
- Box office: $13,062

The Unforgivable is a 2021 psychological drama film directed by Nora Fingscheidt and written by Peter Craig, Hillary Seitz, and Courtenay Miles, based on the 2009 British miniseries Unforgiven written by Sally Wainwright. The film stars Sandra Bullock as a woman who, following her release from prison after serving twenty years for committing murder, is determined to reunite with her estranged younger sister. Vincent D'Onofrio, Jon Bernthal, Richard Thomas, Linda Emond, Aisling Franciosi, Rob Morgan, and Viola Davis also star.

A co-production of the United States, the United Kingdom, and Germany, The Unforgivable was produced by Bullock, Graham King, and Veronica Ferres. Filming began in Vancouver in February 2020 and, after halting due to the COVID-19 pandemic, concluded that October. The film received a limited theatrical release in the United States on November 24, 2021, prior to streaming on Netflix on December 10, 2021. It received mixed reviews from critics.

== Plot ==
Ruth Slater is released from prison after serving twenty years for killing a sheriff who came to evict her and her five-year-old sister, Katie, from their home in Snohomish, Washington. Upon her release, she gets two jobs, and begins to search for her estranged younger sister.

Katie, having been raised by an adoptive family in Seattle, does not consciously remember Ruth, although she has brief memories of trauma. On the day of Ruth's release, Katie is involved in a car accident, and returns to her adoptive parents' home to recover. Katie's parents worry that the accident was due to her memories, and that she may somehow be aware that Ruth has been released. They agree that they were right to hide the truth from Katie, for her own good.

Meanwhile, Keith, the eldest son of the sheriff Ruth killed, has learned of Ruth's release and begins stalking her, learning where she lives and where she works. He plots revenge, but is unable to get his younger brother Steve on board, who constantly tells Keith to "leave it alone".

One day, Ruth returns to her former home to see it fully renovated. She meets the new occupants, John and Liz Ingram. John invites Ruth inside to see the renovations. As Ruth leaves, John, feeling sympathetic, offers her a ride to the bus stop. Ruth learns that John is a corporate lawyer, and she tells him about her search for Katie. John decides to help her, but soon after, he learns the truth about Ruth's past. Ruth apologizes for lying, and John agrees to take her case.

While Ruth is working on a construction site, Steve briefly talks to Ruth, who is unaware of Steve's identity. Steve mentions her parents, and Ruth states they are dead. Steve apologizes, and Ruth responds, "life goes on", an unintentionally dismissive comment that sends Steve into a silent rage. After Ruth leaves, Steve goes through Ruth's belongings, discovering a picture of Katie.

John determines where Katie and her family live. He reaches out to the parents, who reluctantly agree to meet with Ruth anonymously. During the meeting, Ruth finds out that they have deliberately not told Katie about her, and have withheld all the letters that she wrote to Katie during her years in prison. They tell Ruth that Katie does not know of or remember her at all, and it is best for her if it stays that way. When Ruth suffers an outburst of emotion, Katie's parents angrily storm out of the room.

Emily, the younger adopted sister of Katie, overhears her parents talking about Ruth and discovers the letters. As she reads them, Emily is moved by Ruth's words, and is reduced to tears. Emily takes it upon herself to contact Ruth and arrange a meeting. At the end of their meeting, Emily informs Ruth that Katie will have a rehearsal at a local auditorium later that day. As Emily returns home, Steve stalks her, discovering where she lives.

Ruth returns to the Ingrams' home to speak with John about approaching Katie. He is not home, though, and Ruth is approached by a furious Liz who tells her to leave. Through flashbacks, it is revealed that it was the five-year-old Katie who had actually fired the shot that killed the sheriff, but Ruth took the blame, to protect her. Learning the truth, Liz feels sympathetic towards Ruth and drives her to the recital.

After learning about Katie, Steve becomes more insistent on the idea of revenge; however, as soon as he comes home with his baby, he catches his wife Hannah having sex with his brother Keith, and then starts beating him up in a fit of rage, before leaving the house. Motivated by anger, he kidnaps Emily, thinking she is Katie. As Ruth arrives at the recital, she receives a phone call from Steve who demands that Ruth come to where they are. Liz drives her to the location and, becoming aware of the situation, calls the authorities as Ruth goes inside. Steve declares his intent to kill the girl, but when Ruth expresses remorse for all that has happened, he cannot go through with it. Ruth helps Emily out of the room, then gives herself up to the police and Steve is arrested. Her parole officer arrives at the scene, and Ruth is released. As Ruth begins to walk away, she notices Emily's parents and Katie have come to pick up Emily, and Ruth and Katie finally meet again and embrace.

== Cast ==
- Sandra Bullock as Ruth Slater
- Vincent D'Onofrio as John Ingram
- Jon Bernthal as Blake
- Richard Thomas as Michael Malcolm
- Linda Emond as Rachel Malcolm
- Aisling Franciosi as Katherine Malcolm
  - Neli Kastrinos as Katie (five years old)
- Rob Morgan as Vincent Cross
- Viola Davis as Liz Ingram
- Emma Nelson as Emily Malcolm
- Will Pullen as Steve Whelan
- Thomas Guiry as Keith Whelan
- Jess McLeod as Hannah Whelan
- Andrew Francis as Corey
- W. Earl Brown as Mac Whelan

== Production ==
In August 2010, it was announced that Graham King would produce Unforgiven, a feature film adaptation of the 2009 British miniseries of the same name, through his GK Films banner. Christopher McQuarrie was hired to write the screenplay, which was being tailored for Angelina Jolie to play the lead role. In November 2011, Scott Frank was hired to rewrite and direct Unforgiven, as McQuarrie was busy directing Jack Reacher. In June 2013, it was reported that McQuarrie had returned to the film as writer and director, and would also serve as a producer with King.

In November 2019, it was reported that Sandra Bullock would star in the then-untitled film. She would also serve as a producer through her company Fortis Films. Veronica Ferres would also produce through her company Construction Film. Nora Fingscheidt replaced McQuarrie as director, and Netflix would distribute. In December 2019, Viola Davis, Aisling Franciosi and Rob Morgan joined the cast of the film. Vincent D'Onofrio, Jon Bernthal, Richard Thomas, Linda Emond and Emma Nelson joined in February 2020.

Principal photography began in Vancouver, British Columbia, Canada, standing in for Seattle, on February 3, 2020, with plans to wrap on April 9. Cinematographer Guillermo Navarro shot the film with Red Digital Cinema Helium cameras and Arri Ultra Prime lenses, which he had previously used on Dolittle. On March 13, filming was halted due to the COVID-19 pandemic, and the date to wrap filming was delayed. Production resumed on September 2, and concluded on October 15. The film was one of the first Netflix projects to shoot at the Canadian Motion Picture Park Studios in Burnaby, after Netflix established their Metro Vancouver production hub at the studios in September 2020.

Hans Zimmer and David Fleming reteamed to compose the film score, which was recorded at Synchron Stage Vienna. Maisie Music Publishing has released the soundtrack.

== Release ==
In August 2021, the film's title was revealed to be The Unforgivable. It received a limited release in theaters on November 24, 2021, prior to streaming on Netflix on December 10.

== Reception ==
=== Box office ===
The Unforgivable was released only in South Korea, and grossed $13,062 internationally.

=== Viewership ===
The Unforgivable was the most-streamed film on Netflix's charts for English-language films during its first week of release, with 85.86 million hours viewed. It was also the most-streamed film in the United States according to TV Time. It retained its position on Netflix's charts the following week with a viewership of 74.44 million hours while also retaining its position in TV Time's rankings. Nielsen stated that it was the most-streamed film with 566 million minutes viewed, and also the sixth most-streamed title for the week.

In the third week, the film was displaced to the second position by Don't Look Up, while totalling a viewership of 26.6 million hours for the week. Meanwhile, it dropped to the eighth position on TV Time's chart. It also became the second movie starring Sandra Bullock to be ranked among the top 10 most-streamed films of all time on Netflix, ranking at ninth with a viewership of 186.9 million hours. It retained its second position on the weekly Netflix charts in the following week with a viewership of 21.31 million hours. In the fifth week it fell to the fifth position with a viewership of 11.34 million hours. According to Netflix, the film accumulated a viewership of 214.7 million hours in its first 28 days of release, becoming the fifth most-streamed film on the platform at the time.

=== Critical response ===
On review aggregator Rotten Tomatoes, the film holds an approval rating of 40% based on 90 reviews, with an average rating of 5/10. The website's critics consensus reads: "The Unforgivable proves Sandra Bullock is more than capable of playing against type, but her performance is wasted on a contrived and unrelentingly grim story." On Metacritic, the film holds a score of 41 out of 100, based on 20 critics, indicating "mixed or average" reviews.
