= The Tourist (2010 film) =

2010 film by Florian Henckel von Donnersmarck

- Theatrical release poster
- Directed by: Florian Henckel von Donnersmarck
- Screenplay by: Florian Henckel von Donnersmarck; Christopher McQuarrie; Julian Fellowes
- Based on: Anthony Zimmer by Jérôme Salle
- Produced by: Graham King; Timothy Headington; Roger Birnbaum; Gary Barber; Jonathan Glickman
- Starring: Angelina Jolie; Johnny Depp; Paul Bettany; Timothy Dalton; Steven Berkoff; Rufus Sewell; Christian De Sica
- Cinematography: John Seale
- Edited by: Joe Hutshing; Patricia Rommel
- Music by: James Newton Howard
- Production companies: GK Films; Spyglass Entertainment; StudioCanal
- Distributed by: Columbia Pictures (through Sony Pictures Releasing)
- Release date: December 10, 2010
- Running time: 103 minutes
- Country: United States
- Language: English
- Budget: $100 million
- Box office: $278.8 million

The Tourist is a 2010 American romantic thriller film co-written and directed by Florian Henckel von Donnersmarck and starring Angelina Jolie, Johnny Depp, Paul Bettany, and Timothy Dalton, and follows an American tourist who is approached by a mysterious woman until he realized that the mobster is following him, whom they believed to be a man who stole money from them. It is a remake of the 2005 French film Anthony Zimmer. GK Films financed and produced the film, with Sony Pictures Worldwide Acquisitions releasing it in most countries through Columbia Pictures. The $100 million budget film went on to gross $278.8 million at the worldwide box office.

Despite negative reception from the critics, the film was nominated for three Golden Globes, with a debate arising over the question as to whether it was a comedy or a drama. Henckel von Donnersmarck repeatedly stated it was neither genre, calling it "a travel romance with thriller elements", but that if he had to choose between the two, he would choose comedy.

== Plot ==
British woman Elise Clifton-Ward is being followed through downtown Paris by French police, who are working with Scotland Yard under the direction of Inspector John Acheson (Paul Bettany). Acheson has spent years hunting Alexander Pearce, Elise's lover, who owes £744 million in back taxes, and is believed to have used plastic surgery to alter his appearance.

Pearce is also being hunted by Reginald Shaw (Steven Berkoff), a mobster from whom he stole $2.3 billion. At a Parisian café, Elise (Angelina Jolie) receives written instructions from Pearce: board the train to Venice, Italy; pick out a man; and let the police believe that he is Pearce. Elise burns the note, evades the police, and boards the train.

On the train, Elise selects Frank Tupelo (Johnny Depp), a mathematics teacher from a community college in Wisconsin. Acheson salvages information about the plan from the remains of the burned note. Aware of her location, but not of the ruse, a policeman on Shaw's payroll alerts Shaw that Pearce is on the train to Venice with Elise. Shaw immediately proceeds to Venice.

In Venice, Elise invites Frank to stay with her at the Hotel Danieli, where she receives instructions from Pearce to attend a ball. She abandons Frank, who is then chased by Shaw's men. While trying to escape, he is detained by the Italian police, and a corrupt inspector attempts to turn him over to Shaw's men for a bounty.

Elise rescues Frank just before he is handed over, leading Shaw's men on an extended boat chase before finally escaping. She leaves Frank at the airport with his passport and money, urging him to go home for his own safety.

Elise goes to see Acheson, who has come to Venice, and is revealed to be an undercover Scotland Yard agent who was under suspension for her suspected sympathies with Pearce. She agrees to participate in a sting operation to bring him to justice. As she tries to find Pearce at the ball, a man places an envelope on her table and disappears into the crowd. Elise tries to follow him, but is stopped by Frank, who claims to be in love with her and invites her to dance. The police arrive and take Frank into protective custody. Elise reads the note and leaves in her boat, tailed by Shaw and the police.

When Elise gets to the house to which Pearce's note directed her, Shaw takes her hostage, threatening to harm her unless she reveals the location of a hidden safe where Pearce is keeping the stolen money. The police monitor the situation from outside, and Acheson repeatedly refuses to allow Italian police snipers to intervene to rescue Elise.

While the police are distracted monitoring the situation, Frank escapes and confronts Shaw, claiming to be Pearce and offering to open the safe if Elise is allowed to leave. Shaw tells him to open the safe or he will have Elise tortured. Chief Inspector Jones (Timothy Dalton) arrives at the police stake-out, overrides Acheson, and orders the snipers to fire, killing Shaw and his men. Then, to Elise's obvious pleasure, Jones lifts her suspension and fires her.

Acheson receives a message that Pearce has been found nearby but, on arrival, he learns the police have detained an Englishman who says he is only a tourist being paid to follow instructions and is not Pearce. Elise tells Frank that she loves him, but she also loves Pearce. Frank opens the safe by entering the correct code, revealing that he was Alexander Pearce all along.

When the police come back and open the safe with explosives, they find a check for £744 million. Acheson wants to keep pursuing Pearce but, as the taxes are now paid, Jones closes the case. Pearce and Elise sail away together.

== Cast ==
- Johnny Depp as Frank Tupelo/Alexander Pearce
- Angelina Jolie as Elise Clifton-Ward
- Paul Bettany as Inspector John Acheson
- Timothy Dalton as Chief Inspector Jones
- Steven Berkoff as Reginald Shaw
- Rufus Sewell as The Englishman/Lawrence Mason
- Christian De Sica as Colonel Lombardi
- Alessio Boni as Sergeant Cerato
- Daniele Pecci as Lieutenant Narduzzi
- Giovanni Guidelli as Lieutenant Tommassini
- Raoul Bova as Conte Filippo Gaggia
- Bruno Wolkowitch as Commissaire Courson
- Mhamed Arezki as Achmed Tchebali
- Marc Ruchmann as Brigadier Kaiser
- Julien Baumgartner as Brigadier Ricuort
- François Vincentelli as Brigadier Marion
- Nino Frassica as Brigadier Mele
- Igor Jijikine as Virginsky
- Neri Marcorè as Alessio, the hotel concierge
- Renato Scarpa as Arturo, a tailor
- Maurizio Casagrande as Guido, a waiter
- Giovanni Esposito as Coppa, an interpreter

== Production ==
The project went through a number of directorial and cast changes. Originally, Lasse Hallström was set to direct, with Charlize Theron to play the female lead. After Hallström left, allegedly over scheduling conflicts, Bharat Nalluri came on board, and then Tom Cruise was announced to play the male lead, though he was later replaced by Sam Worthington. When Angelina Jolie accepted her role, so did director Florian Henckel von Donnersmarck, but he, along with Worthington subsequently left, citing "creative differences". After many other directors were considered, including Alfonso Cuarón, Henckel von Donnersmarck returned, re-wrote the script in two weeks, and shot the film in 58 days (including 2nd unit days), with Johnny Depp as the male lead.

Filming began in Paris with Jolie on February 23, 2010, before moving to Venice, where Depp joined the production on March 1. French Minister of Culture Frédéric Mitterrand visited Florian Henckel von Donnersmarck on set when The Tourist was filming in Place Colette.

Henckel von Donnersmarck was assisted by stunt coordinator Simon Crane, who devised the boat action sequence. In the DVD director's commentary, Henckel von Donnersmarck recounts that the film's one action sequence was devised by Crane to allow for the speed limitations imposed on boats in Venice. This speed limit was strictly enforced by the Venetian authorities, and there was a policeman on set at all times to make sure no wave movement caused the pillars on which the palazzi are built to be exposed to oxygen. Henckel von Donnersmarck and Crane felt that if one boat was towing the other, this could perhaps be a realistic reason for a slow speed chase.

The whole film was made in only a little over 11 months, counting from the day Henckel von Donnersmarck came on board to re-write and direct to the day of the premiere in New York. It had to be shot so quickly because Depp had to leave for Hawaii to start filming the fourth film of the Pirates of the Caribbean franchise. The reason post-production had to happen so quickly was because all commercially interesting release dates in 2011 were reserved for the potential start of Pirates of the Caribbean: On Stranger Tides.

== Reception ==
=== Critical reception ===
On Rotten Tomatoes, the film has an approval rating of 20% based on 171 reviews, and an average rating of 4.4/10. The site's critical consensus reads: "The scenery and the stars are undeniably beautiful, but they can't make up for The Tourist's slow, muddled plot, or the lack of chemistry between Johnny Depp and Angelina Jolie." On Metacritic, the film has a weighted average score of 37 out of 100 based on 37 critics, indicating "generally unfavorable reviews". Audiences polled by CinemaScore gave the film an average grade of "B" on an A+ to F scale.

Roger Ebert gave the film 2 out of 4 stars, saying "There's a way to make a movie like The Tourist, but Florian Henckel von Donnersmarck doesn't find that way." Peter Travers of Rolling Stone gave the film 0 out of 4 stars, and put the film on his list of the top 10 worst films of 2010.

However, the film received good reviews in the German press, and Stephanie Zacharek, a Rotten Tomatoes Top Critic, listed the film as one of her "10 Best Movies of 2010." She called it "a visually sensuous picture made with tender attention to detail and an elegant, understated sense of humor".

Casey Burchby of DVD Talk acknowledged that the movie was "beautifully shot by the accomplished Oscar-winner John Seale," but said that the "hastily-prepared film does not care one iota about its characters."

=== Cultural reception ===
At the 2011 Golden Globe Awards, Ricky Gervais made fun of the film while he was presenting. After this, in a scripted, fictional encounter on the show Life's Too Short, which was written by Gervais and Stephen Merchant, Johnny Depp reminded Gervais that the film was very successful, grossing $278 million, which was a dig aimed at Gervais, whose only two Hollywood films (Ghost Town and The Invention of Lying) had grossed $27 million and $32 million, respectively.

=== Awards ===
The film was nominated for three Golden Globe Awards: Best Musical or Comedy, Best Actor – Musical or Comedy (Depp), and Best Actress – Musical or Comedy (Jolie). The fact that a film originally promoted as a romantic thriller was nominated in the comedy category garnered the film and the Golden Globes considerable mockery. It was later revealed that the film was originally submitted by the studio as a drama, but Henckel von Donnersmarck then told the HFPA that it should be categorized as a comedy. HFPA President Phil Berk said, "Given the differing opinions, we asked the studio to screen the film for us in advance, and collectively, we decided that the elements of preposterous fun lent the film more to a comedy than a straight drama category."

Awards
Ceremony	Award	Category	Name	Outcome
68th Golden Globe Awards	Golden Globe Award	Best Picture: Musical or Comedy		Nominated
68th Golden Globe Awards	Golden Globe Award	Best Actor: Musical or Comedy	Johnny Depp	Nominated
68th Golden Globe Awards	Golden Globe Award	Best Actress: Musical or Comedy	Angelina Jolie	Nominated
2011 Teen Choice Awards	Teen Choice Awards	Choice Movie: Action		Nominated
2011 Teen Choice Awards	Teen Choice Awards	Choice Movie: Actor Action	Johnny Depp	Won
2011 Teen Choice Awards	Teen Choice Awards	Choice Movie: Actress Action	Angelina Jolie	Won
2011 ASCAP Awards	ASCAP Film and Television Music Awards	Top Box Office Films	James Newton Howard	Won

== Soundtrack ==
The soundtrack CD of The Tourist was released on December 21, 2010.
