= ...Waiting on You =

Album by Jonathan Kelly's Outside

- L–R: Dave Sheen, Jonathan Kelly, Trevor Williams, Snowy White

Studio album by Jonathan Kelly's Outside
- Released: 15 February 1974
- Recorded: Spring 1973 (Island Studio 2)
- Genre: Folk rock
- Length: 48:31
- Label: RCA
- Producer: Jonathan Kelly

Singles from "...Waiting on You"
- 1. ""...Waiting on You" b/w "Outside"" Released: 1974, RCA LPBO 5030

Jonathan Kelly chronology
Wait 'til They Change the Backdrop (1973)	...Waiting on You (1974)	Two Days in Winter (1975)

...Waiting on You is a folk rock album released in 1974, featuring songs written by Irish singer-songwriter Jonathan Kelly. It was the only album recorded by his band Jonathan Kelly's Outside.

== Track listing ==
All songs by Jonathan Kelly

1. "Misery" – 6:25
2. "Making It Lonely" – 4:55
3. "Tempest" – 6:21
4. "Sensation Street" – 6:00
5. "Great Northern Railroad" – 8:00
6. "I'll Never Find Another Love" – 4:22
7. "Yesterday's Promises" – 3:53
8. "Tell Me People" – 8:42

== Personnel ==
Jonathan Kelly's Outside

- Jonathan Kelly – vocals, guitar, piano
- Snowy White – lead guitar
- Trevor Williams – bass
- Dave Sheen – drums, percussion

Additional personnel

- Chas Jankel – lead guitar (tracks 4, 7, 8)
- Peter Wood – piano (track 5)
- Max Middleton – clavinet (track 1)
- Ron Carthy – trumpet (tracks 3, 8)
- Mick Eve – saxophone (tracks 3, 8)
- Chris Mercer – saxophone (tracks 3, 8)
- Smiley DeJonnes – congas (tracks 3, 4, 6)

== Production ==
- Jonathan Kelly: producer
- Brian Humphries: engineer
- Jak Kilby: cover photo
- Tim Staffell: album design
