= London Boulevard =

2010 UK crime film by William Monahan

- Theatrical release poster
- Directed by: William Monahan
- Screenplay by: William Monahan
- Based on: London Boulevard by Ken Bruen
- Produced by: Graham King; William Monahan; Quentin Curtis; Timothy Headington; Redmond Morris; Colin Vaines
- Starring: Colin Farrell; Keira Knightley; David Thewlis; Anna Friel; Ben Chaplin; Ray Winstone
- Cinematography: Chris Menges
- Edited by: Dody Dorn; Robb Sullivan
- Music by: Sergio Pizzorno
- Production companies: GK Films; Henceforth
- Distributed by: Entertainment Film Distributors
- Release date: 26 November 2010
- Running time: 103 minutes
- Country: United Kingdom
- Language: English
- Budget: £8 million (US$ 12.3 million)
- Box office: $4.6 million

London Boulevard is a 2010 British crime thriller film written and directed by William Monahan (in his directorial debut), based on Ken Bruen's 2001 novel of the same name. The film stars Colin Farrell, Keira Knightley, and Ray Winstone. It was released in the United Kingdom on 26 November 2010, by Entertainment Film Distributors.

== Plot ==
Harry Mitchel (convicted of grievous bodily harm under never-explained circumstances) is leaving prison. He is propositioned by his friend and former partner-in-crime, Billy Norton, to live in a nice "acquired" apartment, but on condition he works for Billy's criminal boss. On his way to a "welcome back" party, Mitchel saves a woman, Penny, from being mugged.

At the party, Billy propositions Mitchel again. Mitchel is told by Billy and their contact, Danny, that his sister, Briony, is in the basement, and he saves her from being raped by a drug addict. Mitchel meets Penny for a drink elsewhere, and she offers him a job to help her friend, a reclusive famous "retired" young actress, Charlotte.

Mitchel goes to a railway station to visit his friend Joe, a blind homeless Big Issue salesman, and gives him a knife to protect himself. The next day, Mitchel meets Charlotte and her friend, Jordan. Charlotte is constantly hounded by the paparazzi perpetually stationed outside her home, taunting and photographing anyone who enters or leaves.

Mitchel is offered the job to "assist" and Jordan gives him a tour of the mansion, including a collection of paintings that look like Francis Bacon's studies on Velazquez screaming Popes and a garage full of Charlotte's ex-husband Tim's cars. At his apartment, corrupt police Detective Bailey visits Mitchel, tells him to avoid Billy, and forces a small bribe from Mitchel.

Mitchel talks to Billy about Detective Bailey, whom Billy cannot stand. Joe is mugged, then brutally beaten by two 16-year-old footballers from the estate and left for dead; and one of the boys takes Joe's knife. At the hospital, Dr Sanji Raju lets Mitchel visit Joe, who wants Mitchel to avenge his death.

The next day, Billy tells Mitchel that he knows about the car collection and that his boss wants to steal them. At Joe's funeral, Dr Raju tells Mitchel that he wants to date Briony, which Mitchel accepts. Mitchel goes to the pub and asks Danny to find out as much as he can about the two footballers. That night, Mitchel is kidnapped by Billy and taken to his boss, Rob Gant, who insists that Mitchel collect money for him.

Charlotte and Mitchel escape from the paparazzi to her mansion in the countryside. Charlotte mentions to Mitchel that something happened to her in Italy, which is implied to be a drug overdose. Jordan reveals to Mitchel that in this incident she was raped by a drug addict, who never got caught but is currently on life support after overdosing on quaaludes, administered by Jordan.

Gant threatens Detective Bailey to stop him from making Mitchel pay bribes. Later that evening, Mitchel and Billy meet Gant in a garage, where Gant shoots a black man, whom Gant was led to believe by Billy to be one of the Nation of Islam members who beat up Mitchel and scared off Billy while earlier collecting for Gant. Gant yells at Billy, but Mitchel protects Billy and yells at Gant, who claims Mitchel said to kill anyone. Gant tells Mitchel he is now an 'accessory' to the killing, and to meet him at Criterion Restaurant the next night, for an unknown arrangement.

Charlotte tells Mitchel she loves him. Later, Mitchel and Gant meet and Gant assigns Mitchel to collect money in Streatham, Clapham, and Kennington. Gant reveals that the main mugger footballer has a future and is being scouted by professional teams, and implies that Mitchel had best leave him alone.

Mitchel tells Gant that if he were a gangster, Gant would be the first person he would kill and would take everything Gant has, but claims he is not a gangster and walks away. Gant, to put Mitchel in trouble, waylays the doctor who owns Mitchel's apartment, and after Gant rapes him, he orders his henchmen, Fletcher and Beaumont, to kill him. Mitchel learns who the footballer is and follows him into a tunnel, planning to shoot him, but has a change of heart at the last moment, and lets the young man walk away unaware.

Mitchel visits Charlotte and tells her that he loves her; the two sleep together. Mitchel sees Billy's van and attacks Billy, who says that Gant sent him to kill Mitchel; he warns Mitchel to look for "a big Bosnian fucker". Mitchel borrows one of Charlotte's husband's Rolls-Royces and confronts Billy at a pub. He beats Billy, who says Gant will kill everyone whom Mitchel loves, and Mitchel steals the money Billy collected for Gant.

Mitchel meets his sister at a restaurant to persuade her to get out of the country and out of Gant's reach. He gives her a train ticket and money, but she ignores the warning, resulting in her and Dr. Raju being killed by Gant. Mitchel and Jordan find Billy's dead body in the front garden of Charlotte's home and the Bosnian, named Storbor, lurking outside the gate.

Mitchel asks Jordan to help him kill Storbor and the two follow Storbor to a nightclub where they meet him and the drug addict from the party named Whiteboy. Mitchel kills Gant and it looks to be a happy ending. But when Mitchel walks out to the street on his way to go to America, the young kid he let live stabs him several times in the side and leaves him to die.

== Cast ==
- Colin Farrell as Harry Mitchel, an ex convict
- Keira Knightley as Charlotte, a reclusive young actress
- David Thewlis as Jordan, Charlotte's agoraphobic business manager, who soon befriends Mitchel and helps him out during the film.
- Anna Friel as Briony Mitchel, Mitchel's "wild" sister who meets and later dates Dr Raju.
- Ben Chaplin as Billy Norton, a none too smart criminal and friend of Mitchel's
- Ray Winstone as Rob Gant, a crime boss and homosexual rapist
- Velibor Topic as Storbor
- Eddie Marsan as DI Bailey, a corrupt cop who is following Jordan and bribing Mitchel, causing him to get into trouble with Gant.
- Sanjeev Bhaskar as Sanji Raju, a friend of Mitchel's who begins to court Briony.
- Stephen Graham as Danny, a contact of Mitchel
- Ophelia Lovibond as Penny, Charlotte's friend
- Simon Grover as the Porter at Storage.
- Gerald Home as the Undertaker.
- Matt King as Fletcher, one of Gant's henchmen.
- Alan Williams as Joe, a homeless man who is friendly with Mitchel.

== Production ==
The film is set in London, where the majority of the scenes were filmed, with some scenes shot at Ealing Studios. It was also filmed in Hammerwood Park, East Sussex. Filming began on 8 June. The giant billboard advertising posters of Charlotte's face that appear in the film were shot by fashion photographer David Bailey.

== Release ==
A trailer was released on 1 November 2010. The film opened in the United Kingdom on 26 November 2010. When the film was released in the United Kingdom, it opened on #3, behind Harry Potter and the Deathly Hallows – Part 1 and Unstoppable.

IFC Films picked up the release rights in the United States, and had a 5 October 2011 release date for the premiere on Video on Demand, and an 11 November 2011 release date for the theatrical release.

== Reception ==
On Rotten Tomatoes the film has an approval rating of 38% based on reviews from 48 critics. The site's consensus states: "In spite of its spotless pedigree and a strong sense of visual style, London Boulevard stumbles over its frenetic pace and crowded, clichéd plot." On Metacritic the film has a weighted average score of 52 out of 100 based on reviews from 13 critics, indicating "mixed or average reviews".

Reviews tended to criticise the narrative as being unfocused. Betsy Sharkey of the Los Angeles Times, while praising the cinematography, a "beautifully bleak brush stroke of contemporary noir", and the "brutal extremes" of violence, wrote that "in trying to take a bite out of crime and another out of fame, [Monahan] ended up with more than he can chew for his first time in the director's chair".

The New York Times reviewer found the cockney accents "virtually unintelligible" and complained of "abbreviated, sometimes unnecessary subplots". The A.V. Club also complained of "a surplus of plot threads that don't have space to play out, and accordingly come across as clichés."

Among positive reviews, Stephanie Zacharek of Movieline praised the cinematography of two times Oscar-winner Chris Menges, and the "aura of '60s stylishness", and noted that the violence is "deftly handled". In The Hollywood Reporter, Ray Bennett praised the "gleaming cinematography of London at night", and the soundtrack that "succeeds in evoking the '60s while sounding entirely in the present."

The Urban Cinefile's review stated: "Fast-paced with great cinematography and an upbeat score, this graphically violent thriller satisfies on every count".
