= Morgan (band) =

English progressive rock band

- Origin: England
- Genres: Progressive rock
- Years active: 1971–1973
- Label: RCA
- Past members: Morgan Fisher; Tim Staffell; Maurice Bacon; Bob Sapsed

Morgan was an English progressive rock band, formed and disbanded in the early 1970s.

== History ==
Featuring former Smile member Tim Staffell on vocals and guitar, Bob Sapsed of Springfield Park on bass, Maurice Bacon on drums and (the band's namesake) Morgan Fisher on keyboards, Morgan formed in 1971. The group was born from the joint Morgan Fisher–Maurice Bacon band Love Affair, a highly successful soul-pop band (#1 UK hit, "Everlasting Love" in 1968) that transmogrified into the band L.A., a fusion group who combined pop sensibilities with an underground progressive rock approach.

Morgan formed shortly after L.A. lapsed, with the band deciding to discard all pop leanings and launch headlong into composing keyboard-driven progressive rock epics. They sequestered themselves in the newly constructed RCA Studios in Rome, home to the then-cutting edge of recording technology (16-track studios were still considered an extravagant rarity). The profusion of unusual musical instruments in the studio heavily influenced Morgan's on-record soundscape; a 1930 Neo-Bechstein electric piano, harpsichord, marimba, celeste, timpani, tubular bells, and first-generation synthesizers (such as the British VCS3) all united to aid in the crafting of a unique and ground-breaking musical direction.

The band were fans of Yes, Pink Floyd, The Nice and King Crimson, with their progressive approach much influenced by those artists. The group's modus operandi had Fisher composing all the music whilst Staffell focused on the lyrics; their joint efforts steered the band towards science-fiction imagery and concept albums. Their first album, entitled Nova Solis, contained four songs, and concluded with the side-length eponymous title track, the chronicle of a galactic journeyman lamenting the destruction of the Earth. The album's sales were largely disappointing.

Morgan had signed a two-album deal with RCA, and in 1973 embarked on the recording of their second (and ultimately final) album, originally titled "Brown Out." The name of the album was later changed when it became apparent that the band intended to include an insert of the themselves mooning the casual record buyer. Thus "Brown Out" became The Sleeper Wakes. Due their feeling that the music was too complex and left-field, RCA opted not to release The Sleeper Wakes. It was eventually released in the U.S. in 1976 by Import Records, who maintained the original title.

In the wake of these problems the group disbanded, and the members went their separate ways. Staffell went on to craft models for the Thomas the Tank Engine children's TV series and, more recently, founded the funk band aMIGO; whilst Fisher continued performing, first (briefly) with Third Ear Band then Mott the Hoople and later recording as a solo artist. Maurice Bacon went on to play drums with John Otway and later to manage him and other artists. Bob Sapsed was killed in a road accident in 1986.

Staffell's previous band Smile replaced him with Freddie Mercury and went on to massive global success as Queen, who supported Mott the Hoople on their early UK/US tours in 1974. Fisher later played keyboards with Queen on their 1982 Hot Space Tour.

"The Sleeper Wakes" was first released (using that title) in the UK in 1978 by the new independent label Cherry Red Records – it was their very first album release. Morgan Fisher went on to craft several other groundbreaking albums for that label, including "Hybrid Kids," "Slow Music," and the 1980 cult classic "Miniatures" (a collection of 51 one-minute tracks by a variety of cutting-edge artists).

Both Morgan albums were released on CD in 1999/2000 by Angel Air Records and also in Japan on local record labels. "Nova Solis" was re-issued again on CD in 2009 by Esoteric Recordings, testifying to the staying power of this music.

== Discography ==
- Nova Solis (1972)
- The Sleeper Wakes (1973) (aka Brown Out, recorded in 1973, released in 1976)
