= Mike Grose =

English musician (1941–2019)

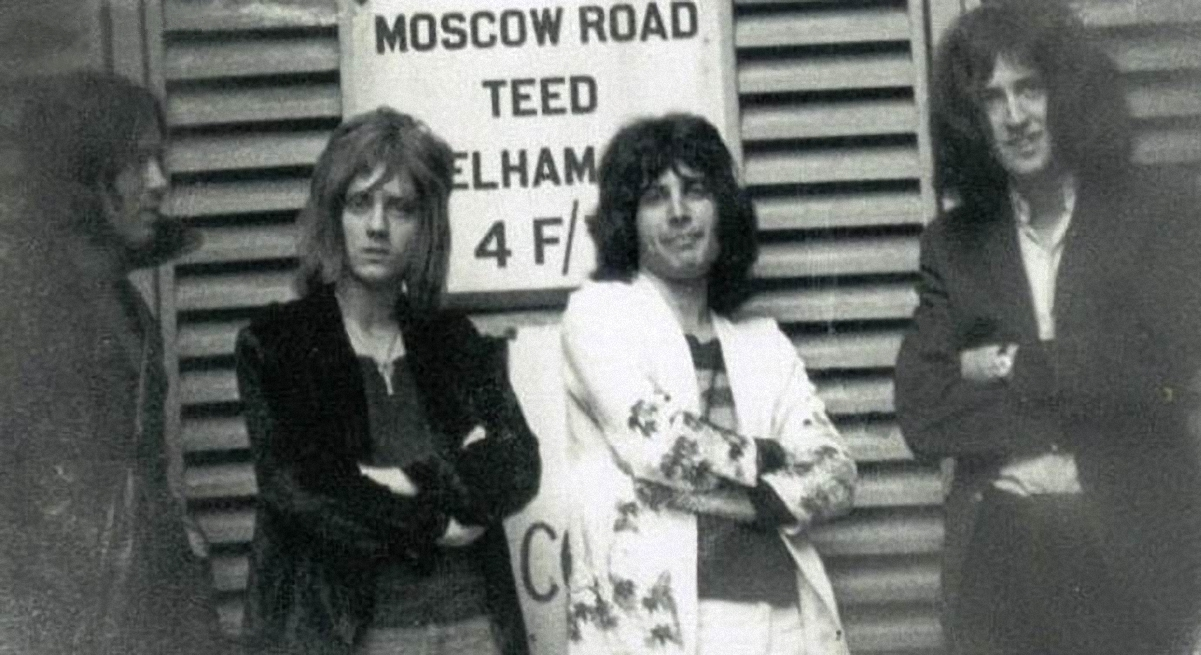
- Queen in 1970 left to right, Grose, Roger Taylor, Freddie Mercury, Brian May

Background information
- Born: 16 March 1941; London, England
- Died: 6 March 2019 (aged 77) London, England
- Instrument: Bass guitar
- Formerly of: Queen

Mike Grose (16 March 1941 – 6 March 2019) was an English musician. He was the first bassist for Queen from April to July 1970, and played three live gigs with the band between 27 June and 25 July.

== Queen ==
Grose, who was from Cornwall, was asked by his childhood friend Roger Taylor to drive up to London to play in his band, the first incarnation of Queen in 1970. Grose co-owned PJ's, a pub where Smile, the precursor band to Queen featuring Taylor and Brian May, used to play. When Queen attracted the attention of John Anthony, he told the band he thought they did not have the right bass player.

Grose left the band in early 1971 after playing three gigs with the band between 27 June and 25 July 1970 (27 June at Hall for Cornwall, 18 July at Imperial College London and 25 July at Grose's PJ's pub). He was replaced by Barry Mitchell, then Doug Bogie and then finally John Deacon.

According to Mark Blake, author of the 2010 Queen biography Is This The Real Life? The Untold Story of Queen, unlike the other three members (Mercury, May, Taylor), Grose wasn't a student and the time they spent between gigs working on songs didn't mesh with his style. "Grose was used to working a day job and playing gigs in the evening, Grose thought the band had potential but wasn’t prepared to wait. He quit after a few months [...]"

== Later life ==
After leaving Queen, he moved back to Cornwall and played in a band called No Joke! which included Tim Staffell, who played in Taylor and May's former band Smile. He then ran a garage at Holmbush, a village in St Austell.

Grose died of brain tumor on March 6, 2019, aged 77. May and Taylor posted tributes to Grose on Instagram, calling him a "powerful figure, with powerful gear! His sound was massive and monolithic," and "He always sounded huge. RIP".
