= Mohamed Ismail (judge) =

Egyptian lawyer and judge (born 1967)

Mohamed A.M. Ismail
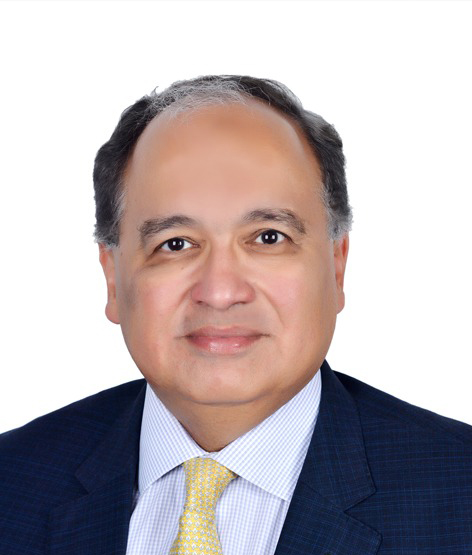
- Born: 24 November 1967 (age 58); Cairo, Egypt
- Office: Vice President of the Egyptian State Council
- Awards: State Prize Laureate - Legal Research- "Arab Republic of Egypt"- 2011/2012

Mohamed A.M. Ismail (Arabic: محمد عبد المجيد إسماعيل) (born 24 November 1967) is an Egyptian jurist. He is a public figure in the legal circles in Egypt and the Middle East region, with international publications in the international legal sphere.

He is vice-president of the Egyptian State Council (Conseil d'État), Judge at the Egyptian Supreme Administrative Court, and former Judge at the Court of Appeal (Contracts Circuit). He is a fellow of the UK Chartered Institute of Arbitrators, Visiting Professor and PhD examiner at British and Egyptian universities, and a lecturer at the Cairo Regional Centre of International Commercial Arbitration (CRCICA). He is the State Prize Laureate in Academic Legal Research for 2011/2012, granted by the Arab Republic of Egypt. Ismail is a lecturer at the Arab League and BCDR-AAA. He is also a member of the Comité Française d'Arbitrage. Ismail is also an associate member of the International Academy of Comparative Law.

== Legal Scholarship ==
As a legal scholar who has published extensively on the international legal sphere, Ismail's research posits that the legal globalization phenomenon is a global tool for integration between common law and civil law legal cultures.

According to Ismail, the unification of international contract law principles is evidence of the legal globalization era, and promotes global understanding in the international legal sphere. His scholarship argues that such unification may lead to the development of a global contract law — a framework he views as a tool to narrow the gap between common law and civil law legal cultures, and as a direct result of the legal globalization phenomenon. In addition, his research suggests that global contract law would remove the barriers between state contracts (traditional administrative contracts with their exorbitant clauses) and international commercial contracts.

Through his lectures at the University of London (SOAS), the Chartered Institute of Arbitrators, and as a visiting fellow at Max-Planck Institute for Comparative and International Private Law, Hamburg, his research concludes that both international commercial arbitration and international investment arbitration are direct outcomes of legal globalization, and that the influence of common law jurisdictions upon civil law legal culture is well-documented.

The theories of legal globalization and its influence upon Arab civil law countries, and global contract law which may be achieved through unification of international contract law principles, are among the legal theories that promote global understanding in the international legal sphere and in social sciences.
