= Graham King =

British film producer

Graham King OBE
- Born: London, United Kingdom
- Occupation: Film producer
- Organization: GK Films

Graham King OBE is a British film producer. He has been nominated four times for the Academy Award for Best Picture for producing the films The Aviator (2004), Hugo (2011), Bohemian Rhapsody (2018), and The Departed (2006), for the last of which he won the award.

== Career ==
King is president and CEO of production company GK Films. He is best known for his 2006 crime thriller film The Departed, which was awarded the Best Picture Oscar at the 79th Academy Awards, and for Bohemian Rhapsody, which was nominated for five awards including Best Picture at the 91st Academy Awards, winning four.

King's multiple commercial successes as a producer include The Departed (which grossed $289.8 million worldwide), The Tourist ($278.3 million), and Bohemian Rhapsody, which grossed over $910 million worldwide against a production budget of about $50 million. Bohemian Rhapsody ultimately became the sixth-highest-grossing film of 2018 worldwide, the second highest-grossing musical biographical film of all time, and in 2022 was listed as one of 20th Century Fox's top five highest-grossing films worldwide.

== Honours ==
King was appointed Officer of the Order of the British Empire (OBE) in the 2010 New Year Honours for services to the film industry.

== Filmography ==
=== Film ===
Producer

- Dr. T & the Women (2000) (co-producer)
- The Aviator (2004)
- The Departed (2006)
- Blood Diamond (2006)
- Next (2007)
- The Young Victoria (2009)
- Edge of Darkness (2010)
- The Town (2010)
- London Boulevard (2010)
- The Tourist (2010)
- Rango (2011)
- Hugo (2011)
- The Rum Diary (2011)
- In the Land of Blood and Honey (2011)
- Dark Shadows (2012)
- Jersey Boys (2014)
- The 5th Wave (2016)
- Allied (2016)
- Tomb Raider (2018)
- Delirium (2018)
- Bohemian Rhapsody (2018)
- The Unforgivable (2021)
- Michael (2026)

Executive producer

- Changing Habits (1997)
- Ping! (2000)
- Traffic (2000)
- Ali (2001)
- The Dangerous Lives of Altar Boys (2002)
- Desert Saints (2002)
- Gangs of New York (2002) (Co-executive producer)
- The Ballad of Jack and Rose (2005)
- An Unfinished Life (2005)
- First Born (2007)
- Gardener of Eden (2007)
- Argo (2012)
- World War Z (2013)

=== Television ===
Executive producer

- Traffic (2004)
- Camelot (2011)
