= GK Films =

British and American film and television production company

GK Films, LLC
- Logo used since 2010
- Formerly: Initial Entertainment Group (1990-2009)
- Industry: Film; Television
- Founded: 1990 (as Initial Entertainment Group); 2009 (as GK Films)
- Founder: Graham King
- Headquarters: Santa Monica, California, U.S.
- Area served: United Kingdom; United States
- Website: http://www.gk-films.com/

GK Films, LLC is a British-American film and television production company founded in 1990 by Graham King, located in Santa Monica, California. In 2005, the firm, which was known as Initial Entertainment Group at that time, signed a deal with Warner Bros.

In 2012, GK signed a new deal with Warner Bros. Pictures.

In June 2016, Revolution Studios acquired the worldwide rights to five of GK Films' productions: Hugo, The Tourist, Edge of Darkness, The Rum Diary and The Young Victoria.

In August 2017, GK signed a three-year first-look deal with Paramount Pictures.

== Filmography ==
=== As GK Films ===
- The Young Victoria (2009)
- Edge of Darkness (2010)
- The Town (2010)
- London Boulevard (2010)
- The Tourist (2010)
- Rango (2011)
- The Rum Diary (2011)
- Hugo (2011)
- In the Land of Blood and Honey (2011)
- Dark Shadows (2012)
- Argo (2012)
- World War Z (2013)
- Jersey Boys (2014)
- The 5th Wave (2016)
- Allied (2016)
- Tomb Raider (2018)
- Delirium (2018)
- Bohemian Rhapsody (2018)
- The Unforgivable (2021)
- Michael (2026)
- You Should Be Dancing (TBA)
- Michael 2 (TBA)

=== As Initial Entertainment Group ===
- Rent-a-Kid (1995)
- Little City (1997)
- Family Plan (1997)
- Changing Habits (1997)
- Walking Thunder (1997)
- Montana (1998)
- Savior (1998)
- Very Bad Things (1998)
- Traffic (2000)
- Dr. T & the Women (2000)
- Ali (2001)
- The Dangerous Lives of Altar Boys (2002)
- Desert Saints (2002)
- Gangs of New York (2002)
- Laws of Attraction (2004)
- The Aviator (2004) (also select International distribution)
- The Ballad of Jack and Rose (2005)
- An Unfinished Life (2005)
- The Departed (2006)
- Blood Diamond (2006)
- Next (2007)
- Gardener of Eden (2007)
- Bangkok Dangerous (2008)

== Television work ==
=== As GK-TV ===
- Camelot (2011)
- Continuum (2012)
