= Smile (band) =

English rock band, precursor to Queen

- Brian May (left), Tim Staffell (centre) and Roger Taylor, outside the Royal Albert Hall, London, c. 27 February 1969

Background information
- Origin: London, England
- Genre: Progressive rock
- Years active: 1968–1970; 1992; 2018
- Label: Mercury
- Spinoffs: Humpy Bong; Queen
- Spinoff of: 1984
- Past members: Brian May; Tim Staffell; Roger Taylor

Smile were an English rock band formed in London in 1968 who were the predecessors of the band Queen. Smile were formed by Tim Staffell and Brian May, and later joined by drummer Roger Taylor. They recorded six songs and disbanded in 1970. These songs were titled "April Lady", "Step on Me", "Polar Bear", "Earth", "Blag", and "Doin' Alright" (later re-recorded by Queen for their self-titled debut album in 1973). These songs exist on the CD Ghost of a Smile.

== History ==
Hampton School mates and guitarists Tim Staffell and Brian May joined other friends to form a musical group in 1965 called "1984", named after the book of the same name. They played many gigs in West London, opening for more famous bands, and they recorded four cover songs at Thames Television on 31 March 1967, as well as "Step on Me", written by May and Staffell. In early 1968, first May then Staffell left the group. May was an astrophysics student at London's Imperial College, and Staffell was enrolled at Ealing Art College. They placed an advertisement on the college notice board for a "Ginger Baker type" drummer, and a young dental student named Roger Taylor auditioned on bongos (his drum kit was elsewhere) and got the job. The band debuted by opening for either Pink Floyd or the Troggs (stories differ) at Imperial College on 26 October 1968. Now performing in the format of a power trio, the band had their biggest public performance on 27 February 1969 at a concert in aid of the National Council for the Unmarried Mother and Her Child, held at the Royal Albert Hall. As of 2026, this gig has the only documented footage from the band’s original run. May, Taylor and Staffell performed on guitar, drums and bass respectively.

Smile gigged quite a bit on the London scene, according to Time Out's listings. On 19 April, they played at the Speakeasy, and on 31 May, they appeared at the Whisky-A-Go-Go.

From March 1969 onwards to April 1970, the band played at a venue known as PJ's Club in Truro, using claims—probably false—to have previously been played on BBC Radio 1 to secure an audience. In May, the band signed a one-off recording deal with Mercury Records to record three tracks, "Earth" (Staffell), "Step on Me" (May), and "Doin' All Right" (May/Staffell). These were recorded in June 1969 at Trident Studios in Soho. Ultimately, this U.S. promotional recording was never published commercially, however, in September of the same year, Mercury Records commissioned them to record three more songs: "April Lady" (Carl Barnwell), "Blag", and "Polar Bear", a "gentle song about a polar bear" written and led by May, at De Lane Lea Studios. Again, the record was not released at the time.

When Staffell left in 1970 to join another band, Humpy Bong, Smile effectively disbanded. Ealing graduate Farrokh Bulsara persuaded May and Taylor to continue, and at about the same time, he changed his name to Freddie Mercury, and joined them as lead vocalist, thus forming a new group, Queen. Queen tried several bass players during this period – Mike Grose, Barry Mitchell and Doug Bogie – none of whom fitted in with the band's chemistry. Not until February 1971 did John Deacon join and complete the lineup, whereupon they began rehearsing for their first album. This definitive lineup lasted until Mercury's death in 1991, their last album being Made in Heaven, released posthumously in 1995.

For their debut album, Queen recorded "Doing All Right". According to the book Queen: The Early Years, Staffell has been well compensated through royalties from the sale of the album, given his co-songwriting credit for the song with May. Queen also recorded the song for their first BBC recording session with John Peel. That session, along with their third session, have been released in the UK as At the Beeb (Band of Joy Records) in 1989, and in the U.S. as Queen at the BBC (Hollywood Records) in 1995. Also in 1995, Queen issued their "Let Me Live" single, of which one CD format features three of the first session BBC recordings, including "Doing Alright".

Smile reunited for several songs on 22 December 1992. Taylor's band the Cross were headlining a gig, and he brought May and Staffell on to play "Earth" and "If I Were a Carpenter". May also performed several other songs that night.

In 2018, Smile reunited once more, at Abbey Road Studios to re-record "Doing All Right". This release was used in Queen's Bohemian Rhapsody film, with May and Taylor taking lead vocals and using Staffell's vocals from the original recording on the middle section.

== Discography ==
Two legitimate releases of the six Smile tracks have been issued: Gettin' Smile (LP) from Japan, released 23 September 1982, on Mercury Records. The sleeve contains notoriously inaccurate lyrics and songwriting credits for the songs. This release was used for all subsequent bootlegs which contain the songs.

Ghost of a Smile (CD) from the Netherlands, released in 1997, on Pseudonym Records. The CD booklet is comprehensive and features new liner notes by Staffell. All the tracks were newly remastered. The album also features two versions of the Eddie Howell/Freddie Mercury collaboration "The Man from Manhattan" (no relation to Smile, except that May plays guitar on it).

There is a bootleg album of their early tracks circa the Smile-era titled Pre-Ordained. Most of them also appeared on the 1995 Italian bootleg In Nuce.
