= Tim Staffell =

English musician

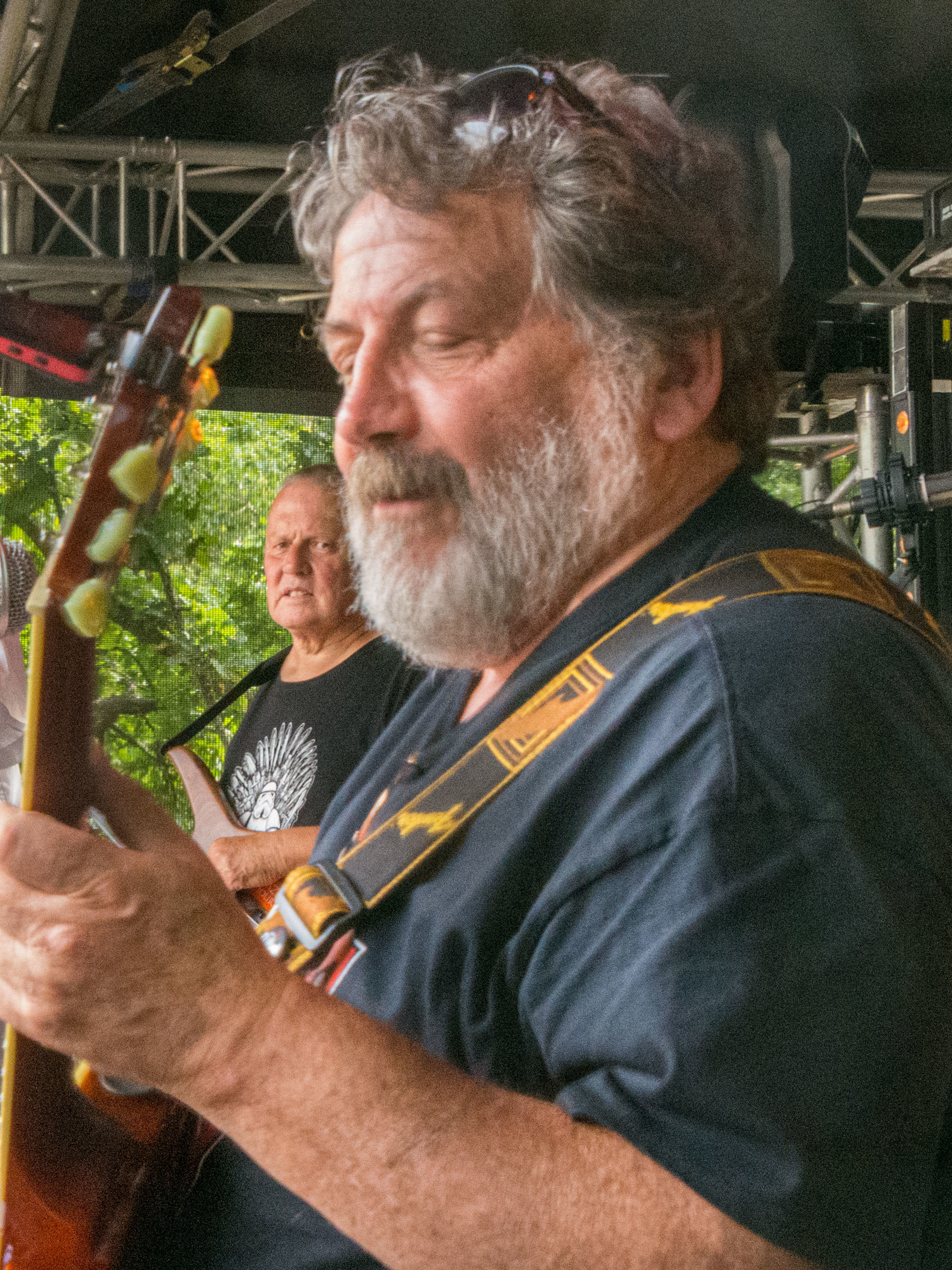
- Staffell at the 2019 Ealing Blues Festival

Background information
- Born: Timothy John Staffell; 24 February 1948 (age 78); Isleworth, Middlesex, England
- Origin: Ealing, London
- Genres: Rock; progressive rock
- Instruments: Guitar; bass; vocals; harmonica
- Years active: 1964–1973; 1992; 2001–present
- Formerly of: 1984; Smile; Humpy Bong; Morgan
- Website: timstaffell.com

Timothy John Staffell (born 24 February 1948) is an English rock musician, visual artist, model maker and designer. He was a member of Smile, a band that included guitarist Brian May and drummer Roger Taylor. Upon Staffell's departure, Smile were joined by Freddie Mercury and Mike Grose and later John Deacon to form the band Queen.

== Early life and music career ==
Timothy John Staffell was born in Isleworth, Middlesex, England. He attended Hampton Grammar School and was the singer in a band called the Railroaders when in 1964 he attended a concert where he met fellow Hampton pupil Brian May. They then put together a blues-rock band called '1984' with John Garnham (guitar), Dave Dilloway (bass), John Sanger (keyboards) and Richard Thompson (drums). In 1965, Staffell began a graphics and drawing course at Ealing Art College where he became friends with Freddie Mercury, while May enrolled at Imperial College, London. 1984 had been a support act for Jimi Hendrix and Pink Floyd prior to Staffell’s departure in 1968, shortly following May’s.

Staffell and May then put together a new band called Smile with Roger Taylor who auditioned to be their drummer. Staffell and May co-wrote the song "Doing All Right", which Queen included on their eponymous debut album. Following his tenure with Smile, Staffell joined Humpy Bong and then the experimental progressive rock outfit Morgan, with whom he released the albums Nova Solis and Brown Out (later retitled The Sleeper Wakes).

== Model maker, designer and animator ==
Staffell later decided to pursue a career as a model maker, designer, animator and commercials director. Among the projects upon which he worked were the BBC television adaptation of The Hitchhiker's Guide to the Galaxy and he was the chief model maker for the first series of the children's TV show Thomas the Tank Engine & Friends.

Later Staffell worked as the Head of Construction at one of the UKs leading Drama Schools Mountview Academy of Theatre Arts, where he imparted his design and model making skills to the future generations of designers and builders.

== Return to music ==
In 2001, Staffell returned to the music industry, co-forming with long-time collaborator Richard Lightman a new blues / funk band called aMIGO, drawing inspiration from folk, Latin and rock. In 2003 they released one eponymous album, with re-recorded versions of the old Smile tunes "Earth" and "Doin' Alright", featuring his former bandmate Brian May on guitars and vocals. The album was self released and available on CD-R for a limited release run (less than 300 copies) and later released via iTunes.

In April 2018, Staffell was invited to record his part of the song "Doin' Alright" alongside the other Smile members, Brian May and Roger Taylor, for the upcoming soundtrack to the movie Bohemian Rhapsody, which tells the life story of Queen. The song was credited to Smile, and titled "Doing All Right ... Revisited". The music score was released on 19 October 2018, and the movie premiere was three days later. The soundtrack debuted on the UK albums chart at number 5 on 26 October 2018.Reaching number 3.

The second Tim Staffell album Two Late was released on digital platforms on 26 October 2018, and it was followed with physical limited release in the middle of November. In July 2019, 'aMIGO’ was re-released (with a live studio version of the song 'Just Couldn't Say) as a Remastered Special Edition CD by MOSCODISC with a new digipack sleeve.

In late 2019/early 2020, together with Paul Stewart, who had previously worked with the British Rhythm & Blues band 'The Others', Staffell recorded an album How High under the band name of Staffell & Stewart; containing a mixture of original material and reimagined rhythm and blues classics.

In September 2021 Staffell travelled to Barcelona to record his third solo album, Wayward Child, at Room To Studios along with his son Andrew. The album was released in 2023, with the first single, 'The Sinner', being released on 24 February, Staffell's 75th birthday.
