= List of awards and nominations received by Cynthia Erivo =

Accolades received by British actress and singer

Cynthia Erivo awards and nominations
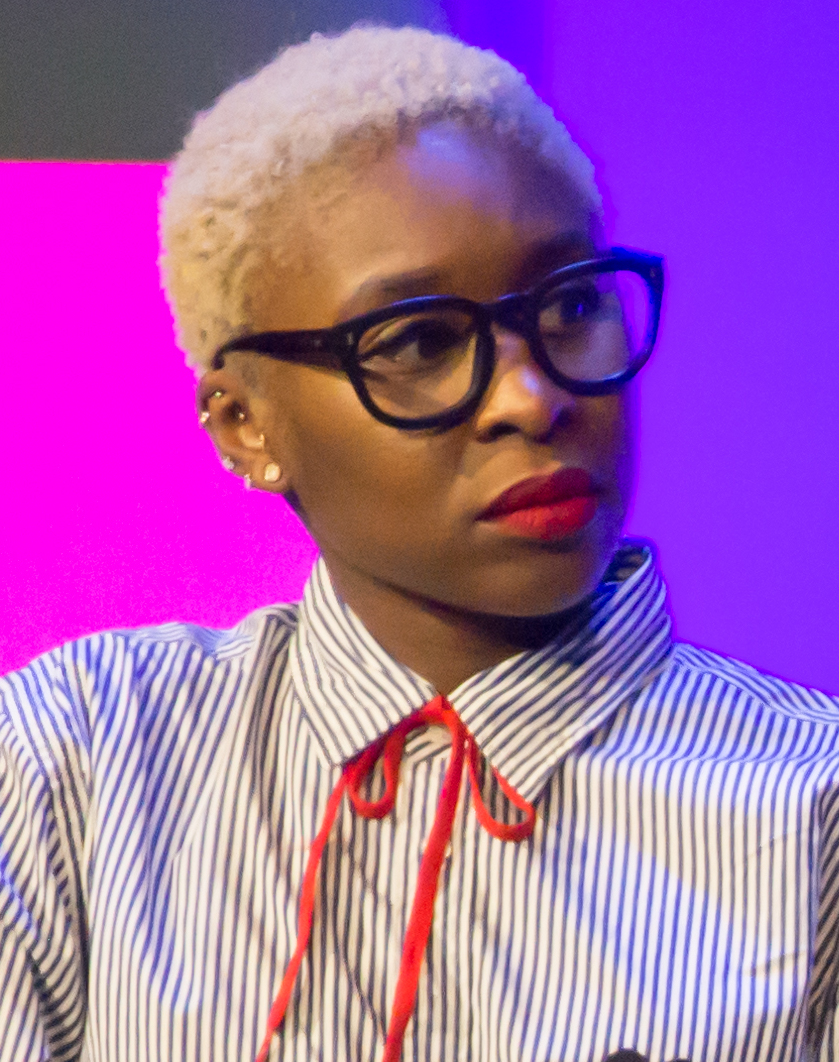
- Erivo attending the Tribeca Film Festival
Awards and nominations
| Award | Wins | Nominations |
| Academy Awards | 0 | 3 |
| Actor Award | 0 | 4 |
| BAFTA Film Awards | 0 | 2 |
| Critics' Choice Awards | 1 | 8 |
| Golden Globe Awards | 0 | 5 |
| Grammy Awards | 2 | 5 |
| Emmy Awards | 1 | 6 |
| Tony Awards | 1 | 3 |

Totals (Note: Certain award groups do not simply award one winner. They acknowledge several different recipients, have runners-up, and have third place. Since this is a specific recognition and is different from losing an award, runner-up mentions are considered wins in this award tally. For simplification and to avoid errors, each award in this list has been presumed to have had a prior nomination.)
- Wins: 30
- Nominations: 112

Cynthia Erivo is a British actress and singer who has received numerous awards throughout her career, including a Tony Award, a Daytime Emmy Award, and two Grammy Awards, as well as nominations for three Academy Awards, two British Academy Film Awards, and five Golden Globe Awards. She is one of only a few artists to have received nominations for the EGOT.

After her West End theatre debut in the early 2010s, Erivo garnered critical attention with her lead role as Celie, a young woman suffering abuse in the Deep South, in the Broadway revival of the musical The Color Purple. She won the Tony Award for Best Actress in a Musical and the Drama Desk Award for Outstanding Actress in a Musical, and also won the Daytime Emmy Award for Outstanding Musical Performance in a Daytime Program and the Grammy Award for Best Musical Theater Album alongside the cast of The Color Purple.

Erivo transitioned to film acting in 2018 with roles in Drew Goddard's neo-noir thriller film Bad Times at the El Royale and Steve McQueen's heist drama Widows. In 2019, she gained national acclaim for portraying slave abolitionist Harriet Tubman in Kasi Lemmons' historical biopic Harriet, receiving Best Actress nominations at the Academy Awards, Golden Globe Awards, and Screen Actors Guild Awards. She also performed and co-wrote the film's lead song "Stand Up" with Joshuah Brian Campbell, which was nominated for the Grammy Award for Best Song Written for Visual Media and for Best Original Song at the Academy Awards and Golden Globe Awards.

In 2020, Erivo starred in the miniseries The Outsider, being nominated for the Critics' Choice Television Awards and the Critics' Choice Super Awards. The following year, she portrayed Aretha Franklin in Genius: Aretha, receiving nominations at the Primetime Emmy Awards, Golden Globe Awards, Satellite Awards, and Screen Actors Guild Awards.

In 2024, Erivo starred as Elphaba Thropp in Wicked, the first of two film adaptations of the stage musical. She garnered critical acclaim for the role and was subsequently nominated for the Academy Award, BAFTA Award, Critics' Choice Movie Award, Golden Globe Award, and Screen Actors Guild Award for Best Actress. With her Academy Award nomination, Erivo joined actress Viola Davis as the second black actress to be nominated multiple times for the Academy Award for Best Actress. She reprised her role as Elphaba in Wicked: For Good (2025) and became the first Black woman to earn multiple Lead Actress (Comedy) nominations at the Golden Globe Awards when she was nominated for Best Actress in a Motion Picture – Musical or Comedy for the film.

== Major associations ==
=== Academy Awards ===
| Year | Category | Work | Result | Ref. |
|---|---|---|---|---|
| 2020 | Best Original Song | "Stand Up" (from Harriet) | Nominated (Note: Shared with Joshua Brian Campbell.) | |
| 2020 | Best Actress | Harriet | Nominated | |
| 2025 | Best Actress | Wicked | Nominated | |

=== Actor Awards ===
| Year | Category | Work | Result | Ref. |
|---|---|---|---|---|
| 2020 | Outstanding Female Actor in a Leading Role | Harriet | Nominated | |
| 2022 | Outstanding Actress in a Miniseries or Television Movie | Genius: Aretha | Nominated | |
| 2025 | Outstanding Cast in a Motion Picture | Wicked | Nominated (Note: Shared with the cast of Wicked.) | |
| 2025 | Outstanding Female Actor in a Leading Role | Wicked | Nominated | |

=== BAFTA Awards ===
| Year | Category | Work | Result | Ref. |
British Academy Film Awards
| 2019 | BAFTA Rising Star Award | | Nominated | |
| 2025 | Best Actress in a Leading Role | Wicked | Nominated | |

=== Emmy Awards ===
| Year | Category | Work | Result | Ref. |
Primetime Emmy Awards
| 2021 | Outstanding Lead Actress in a Limited Series or Movie | Genius: Aretha | Nominated | |
| 2025 | Outstanding Guest Actress in a Comedy Series | Poker Face (episode: "The Game Is a Foot") | Nominated | |
| 2026 | Outstanding Variety Special (Live) | 78th Annual Tony Awards (as producer and host) | Nominated | |
| 2026 | Outstanding Variety Special (Pre-Recorded) | Wicked: One Wonderful Night (as performer and host) | Nominated | |
Daytime Emmy Awards
| 2017 | Outstanding Musical Performance in a Daytime Program | The Color Purple | Won (Note: Shared with the cast of The Color Purple.) | |
Children's and Family Emmy Awards
| 2026 | Outstanding Single Voice Role Performer | RoboGobo | Nominated | |

=== Golden Globe Awards ===
| Year | Category | Work | Result | Ref. |
|---|---|---|---|---|
| 2020 | Best Actress in a Motion Picture – Drama | Harriet | Nominated | |
| 2020 | Best Original Song – Motion Picture | "Stand Up" (from Harriet) | Nominated | |
| 2022 | Best Actress – Miniseries or Television Film | Genius: Aretha | Nominated | |
| 2025 | Best Actress in a Motion Picture – Musical or Comedy | Wicked | Nominated | |
| 2026 | Best Actress in a Motion Picture – Musical or Comedy | Wicked: For Good | Nominated | |

=== Grammy Awards ===
| Year | Category | Work | Result | Ref. |
|---|---|---|---|---|
| 2017 | Best Musical Theater Album | The Color Purple | Won | |
| 2020 | Best Song Written for Visual Media | "Stand Up" | Nominated | |
| 2026 | Best Pop Duo/Group Performance | "Defying Gravity" (with Ariana Grande) | Won | |
| 2026 | Best Arrangement, Instrumental or A Cappella | "Be Okay" | Nominated | |
| 2026 | Best Compilation Soundtrack for Visual Media | Wicked: The Soundtrack (with Ariana Grande) | Nominated | |
| 2027 | Best Traditional Pop Vocal Performance | "For Good" (with Ariana Grande) | Pending | |

=== Tony Awards ===
| Year | Category | Work | Result | Ref. |
|---|---|---|---|---|
| 2016 | Best Leading Actress in a Musical | The Color Purple | Won | |
| 2023 | Best Play | Fat Ham | Nominated | |
| 2026 | Best Revival of a Musical | Cats: The Jellicle Ball | Nominated | |

== Miscellaneous awards ==
| Organizations | Year | Category | Work | Result | Ref. |
|---|---|---|---|---|---|
| American Music Awards | 2025 | Favorite Soundtrack | Wicked: The Soundtrack | Nominated | |
| American Music Awards | 2026 | Favorite Soundtrack | Wicked: For Good – The Soundtrack | Nominated | |
| BET Awards | 2020 | Best Actress | Harriet | Nominated | |
| BET Awards | 2025 | Best Actress | Wicked | Won | |
| BET Awards | 2025 | Her Award | "Defying Gravity" with Ariana Grande | Nominated | |
| BET Awards | 2026 | Best Actress | Herself | Nominated | |
| Black Reel Awards | 2018 | Outstanding Original or Adapted Song | "Jump" from Step | Nominated | |
| Black Reel Awards | 2019 | Outstanding Breakthrough Performance, Female | Bad Times at the El Royale | Nominated | |
| Black Reel Awards | 2020 | Outstanding Actress, Motion Picture | Harriet | Nominated | |
| Black Reel Awards | 2021 | Outstanding Actress, TV Movie/Limited Series | Genius: Aretha | Nominated | |
| Black Reel Awards | 2025 | Outstanding Lead Performance | Wicked | Nominated | |
| Black Reel Awards | 2025 | Outstanding Guest Performance in a Comedy Series | Poker Face | Won | |
| Black Reel Awards | 2026 | Outstanding Lead Performance | Wicked: For Good | Nominated | |
| Critics' Choice Movie Awards | 2020 | Best Actress | Harriet | Nominated | |
| Critics' Choice Movie Awards | 2020 | Best Original Song Written for a Movie | "Stand Up" (from Harriet) | Nominated | |
| Critics' Choice Movie Awards | 2025 | Best Actress | Wicked | Nominated | |
| Critics' Choice Movie Awards | 2025 | Best Acting Ensemble | Wicked | Nominated | |
| Critics' Choice Super Awards | 2021 | Best Actress in a Horror Series | The Outsider | Nominated | |
| Critics' Choice Television Awards | 2021 | Best Supporting Actress in a Drama Series | The Outsider | Nominated | |
| Critics' Choice Television Awards | 2022 | Best Actress in a Movie/Miniseries | Genius: Aretha | Nominated | |
| Critics' Choice Documentary Awards | 2017 | Best Original Song | "Jump" (from Step) | Won | |
| GLAAD Media Awards | 2025 | Stephen F. Kolzak Award | Herself | Won | |
| Hollywood Film Awards | 2019 | Breakout Actress | Harriet | Won | |
| Hollywood Music in Media Awards | 2019 | Best Original Song – Feature Film | "Stand Up" (from Harriet) | Won | |
| Hollywood Music in Media Awards | 2024 | Song – Onscreen Performance – Film | "Defying Gravity" (with Ariana Grande) | Nominated | |
| iHeartRadio Music Awards | 2025 | Favorite Soundtrack | Wicked: The Soundtrack | Won | |
| Irish Film & Television Awards | 2025 | Best International Actress | Wicked | Nominated | |
| United Kingdom New Year Honours | 2025 | Member of the British Empire | For services to Music and Drama | Won | |
| NAACP Image Awards | 2020 | Outstanding Actress in a Motion Picture | Harriet | Nominated | |
| NAACP Image Awards | 2020 | Outstanding Breakthrough Performance in Motion Picture | Harriet | Nominated | |
| NAACP Image Awards | 2020 | Outstanding Ensemble Cast in a Motion Picture | The cast of Harriet | Nominated | |
| NAACP Image Awards | 2020 | Outstanding Song – Traditional | "Stand Up" (from Harriet) | Nominated | |
| NAACP Image Awards | 2022 | Outstanding Actress in a Television Movie, Mini-Series or Dramatic Special | Genius: Aretha | Nominated | |
| NAACP Image Awards | 2022 | Outstanding New Artist | Herself | Nominated | |
| NAACP Image Awards | 2025 | Outstanding Actress in a Motion Picture | Wicked | Nominated | |
| NAACP Image Awards | 2025 | Outstanding Ensemble Cast in a Motion Picture | The cast of Wicked | Nominated | |
| NAACP Image Awards | 2025 | Entertainer of the Year | Herself | Nominated | |
| NAACP Image Awards | 2026 | Entertainer of the Year | Herself | Nominated | |
| NAACP Image Awards | 2026 | Outstanding Actress in a Motion Picture | Wicked: For Good | Won | |
| NAACP Image Awards | 2026 | Outstanding Ensemble Cast in a Motion Picture | Wicked: For Good | Nominated | |
| NAACP Image Awards | 2026 | Outstanding Duo, Group or Collaboration (Traditional) | "For Good" | Nominated | |
| Nickelodeon Kids' Choice Awards | 2025 | Favorite Movie Actress | Wicked | Nominated | |
| Nickelodeon Kids' Choice Awards | 2025 | Favorite Song from a Movie | "Defying Gravity" (with Ariana Grande) | Won | |
| Palm Springs International Film Festival | 2020 | Breakthrough Performance Award | Harriet | Won | |
| Palm Springs International Film Festival | 2025 | Creative Impact in Acting Award | Wicked | Won | |
| Queerty Awards | 2025 | Badass | Herself | Nominated | |
| Santa Barbara International Film Festival | 2020 | Virtuoso Award | Harriet | Won | |
| Santa Barbara International Film Festival | 2026 | Kirk Douglas Award | For Excellence In Film | Won | |
| Satellite Awards | 2020 | Best Actress in a Motion Picture – Drama | Harriet | Nominated | |
| Satellite Awards | 2022 | Best Actress – Miniseries or Television Film | Genius: Aretha | Nominated | |
| Satellite Awards | 2025 | Best Actress in a Motion Picture – Comedy or Musical | Wicked | Nominated | |
| Satellite Awards | 2026 | Best Actress in a Motion Picture – Comedy or Musical | Wicked: For Good | Nominated | |
| Saturn Awards | 2019 | Best Supporting Actress | Bad Times at the El Royale | Nominated | |
| Saturn Awards | 2021 | Best Supporting Actress in a Television Series | The Outsider | Nominated | |
| Saturn Awards | 2026 | Best Actress | Wicked: For Good | Nominated | |
| Society of Composers & Lyricists Awards | 2020 | Outstanding Original Song for Visual Media | "Stand Up" (from Harriet) | Won | |
| Sundance Film Festival | 2025 | Visionary Award | Herself | Honored | |
| Webby Awards | 2025 | Video & Film, Long Form | Cynthia Erivo Teaches Storytelling - Celebrity Substitute - Amazon | Won | |
| Webby Awards | 2025 | Variety & Reality, General Video & Film (Video & Film) | Wicked Stars Ariana Grande & Cynthia Erivo Break Down Viral ‘Holding Space’ Interview | Won | |
| World Soundtrack Awards | 2019 | Best Original Song Written for a Film | "Stand Up" | Won | |

== Theatre awards ==
| Organizations | Year | Category | Work | Result | Ref. |
|---|---|---|---|---|---|
| Drama Desk Award | 2016 | Outstanding Actress in a Musical | The Color Purple | Won | |
| Drama League Award | 2016 | Distinguished Performance | The Color Purple | Nominated | |
| Theatre World Award | 2016 | Outstanding Broadway Debut Performance | The Color Purple | Won | |
| WhatsOnStage Awards | 2014 | Best Actress in a Musical | The Color Purple | Nominated | |

== Critics awards ==
| Organizations | Year | Category | Work | Result | Ref. |
|---|---|---|---|---|---|
| Astra Film Awards | 2024 | Best Actress | Wicked | Won | |
| Astra Film Awards | 2024 | Best Cast Ensemble | Wicked | Nominated | |
| Astra Film Awards | 2026 | Best Actress - Comedy or Musical | Wicked: For Good | Nominated | |
| Astra Film Awards | 2026 | Best Cast Ensemble | Wicked: For Good | Nominated | |
| Astra TV Awards | 2021 | Best Actress in a Limited Series or TV Movie | Genius: Aretha | Nominated | |
| Astra TV Awards | 2025 | Best Guest Actress in a Comedy Series | Poker Face | Won | |
| Celebration of Cinema and Television | 2024 | Actress – Film Award | Wicked | Won | |
| Chicago Film Critics Association | 2024 | Best Actress | Wicked | Nominated | |
| Evening Standard Theatre Awards | 2013 | Best Musical Performance | The Color Purple | Nominated | |
| Houston Film Critics Society | 2020 | Best Original Song | "Stand Up" (from Harriet) | Nominated | |
| Houston Film Critics Society | 2025 | Best Actress | Wicked | Nominated | |
| Kansas City Film Critics Circle | 2025 | Best Actress | Wicked | Nominated | |
| London Film Critics' Circle | 2019 | Supporting Actress of the Year | Bad Times at the El Royale | Nominated | |
| London Film Critics' Circle | 2020 | Best British/Irish Actress of the Year | Harriet | Nominated | |
| London Film Critics' Circle | 2025 | Best British/Irish Performer of the Year | Drift, Wicked | Nominated | |
| Los Angeles Online Film Critics Society | 2019 | Best Ensemble Cast | Widows | Nominated | |
| National Board of Review | 2024 | Spotlight Award | Creative Collaboration of Herself & Ariana Grande | Won | |
| Online Film Critics Society | 2025 | Best Actress | Wicked | Nominated | |
| Outer Critics Circle Award | 2016 | Outstanding Actress in a Musical | The Color Purple | Won | |
| San Diego Film Critics Society | 2024 | Best Actress | Wicked | Nominated | |
| Seattle Film Critics Society | 2024 | Best Actress in a Leading Role | Wicked | Nominated | |
| St. Louis Film Critics Association | 2020 | Best Actress | Harriet | Nominated | |
| St. Louis Film Critics Association | 2024 | Best Actress | Wicked | Nominated | |
| Washington D.C. Area Film Critics Association | 2018 | Best Supporting Actress | Bad Times at the El Royale | Nominated | |
| Washington D.C. Area Film Critics Association | 2024 | Best Actress | Wicked | Nominated | |
| Washington D.C. Area Film Critics Association | 2025 | Best Actress | Wicked: For Good | Nominated | |
| Women Film Critics Circle | 2018 | Best Ensemble | Widows | Won | |
| Women Film Critics Circle | 2018 | Invisible Woman Award | Widows | Nominated | |
| Women Film Critics Circle | 2019 | Best Actress | Harriet | Won | |
| Women Film Critics Circle | 2019 | Best Female Action Hero | Harriet | Won | |
