= Kevan Hall =

American fashion designer (born 1957)

- Born: Detroit, Michigan, US
- Education: Fashion Institute of Design and Merchandising, Los Angeles, California
- Occupation: Fashion designer
- Label: Kevan Hall
- Relatives: Vondie Curtis-Hall (brother) Kasi Lemmons (sister-in-law) Henry Hunter Hall (nephew)
- Website: http://www.kevanhalldesigns.com

Kevan Hall (born 1957, Detroit, Michigan) is an American fashion designer best known for his celebrity red carpet dresses and his role as the design and creative director of Halston (1997–2000). In 2001, he launched his eponymous brand, Kevan Hall Signature that includes couture evening wear, women's pret-a-porter suits, accessories, and luxury home goods. His collections have been worn by Anne Hathaway, Naomi Campbell, Celine Dion, Michelle Obama, Vanessa Williams, Charlize Theron, Viola Davis, and more. In 2018, Hall co-founded the non-profit organization Black Design Collective, alongside costume designer Ruth E. Carter.

== Early life and education ==
Kevan Hall was born in 1957 in Detroit, Michigan, the youngest of three children. His brother is actor and film director, Vondie Curtis-Hall.

By the age of seven, Hall knew that he wanted to be a Fashion Designer.

He attended the Fashion Institute of Design & Merchandising (FIDM) in Los Angeles, where he met his wife, Deborah.

== Career ==
Hall started his fashion career as an assistant to L.A. sportswear designer Harriet Selwyn. In 1983, he founded Kevan Hall Couture, selling to luxury retailers including Neiman Marcus, Saks, Lord & Taylor, Bonwit Teller, Bullocks Wilshire and Bergdorf Goodman. In 1997, Kevan Hall was asked to provide the creative talent to reinvigorate Halston, the dormant label famous for dressing Jacqueline Kennedy, Lauren Hutton, Lauren Bacall, Elizabeth Taylor, among other notable names. Kevan joined Halston as the Design and Creative Director from Fall 1998 - Spring 2000.

In 2002, he launched his own signature ready to wear line, Kevan Hall Collection.

Fashion Week Online highlighted Hall’s Fall/Winter 2022 collection: Trading Post, stating, “his use of regional fabrics, accented with blackened gold and copper metallics, reimagines a glorious era of seafaring trade and opulent beauty.”

Kevan's designs have been worn by many Hollywood stars and fashion icons including Salma Hayek, Charlize Theron, Anne Hathaway, Katherine Heigl, and Michelle Obama.

Kevan Hall and his designs have been featured on numerous television shows. Hall was featured on Kimora: Life in the Fab Lane as he dressed Kimora Lee Simmons for Vogue’s Met Gala in New York. America’s Next Top Model featured Hall’s Spring 2009 collection as a runway challenge as he looked on as a guest judge. Adrienne Maloof from Real Housewives of Beverly Hills featured Hall's collection in a fashion show to introduce her new shoe line.

Hall has made guest appearances on national television shows such as Inside Edition, Extreme Makeover, The Better Half, and E!'s Fashion Police to discuss current fashion trends on and off the red carpet.

In 2024, Kevan Hall opened a pop-up boutique in Cannes, France during the 77th Annual Cannes Film Festival. His Spring 2024 Collection, titled Côte d'Azur after the French Riviera, was inspired by French artist Sonia Delaunay.

== Honors ==
Kevan has been recognized throughout his career for his craftmanship and contribution to fashion. After graduating from FIDM, he received the Peacock Award for Outstanding Fashion Design. In 1989, the NAACP named him the Great American Designer, and in 2005, Life & Style Magazine named him Stylemaker of the Year. In 2002, he was named the 47th Annual Gold Coast Fashion Award's Designer of the Year.
