= Henry Hunter Hall =

American actor

- Occupation: Actor
- Years active: 1997–present
- Parents: Vondie Curtis-Hall (father); Kasi Lemmons (mother)
- Relatives: Kevan Hall (uncle)

Henry Hunter Hall is an American actor.

== Early life ==
Henry Hunter Hall is the son of filmmaker and actress Kasi Lemmons and actor Vondie Curtis-Hall. His uncle is fashion designer Kevan Hall.

== Career ==
Hall began his acting career as a child in Curtis-Hall’s 1997 film Gridlock'd, starring Tim Roth and Tupac.

In 2019, Hall appeared as Walter in Harriet, the film about the life and times of Harriet Tubman. In 2019, he joined the cast of Hunters alongside Al Pacino, Logan Lerman, Carol Kane, and Lena Olin. In 2019, Hall appeared in When They See Us.

In late-2020, Hall was reportedly signed on to a project written by Kenneth Golde, to be the directorial debut of Rich Lee, and co-starring Eva Longoria and Ice Cube, which turned out to be War of the Worlds (2025).

== Filmography ==
=== Film ===
Year	Title	Role	Notes
1997	Gridlock'd	Child	
2006	Waist Deep	Junior	
2013	Black Nativity	Snoopy	
2018	American Animals	Avery	Uncredited
2019	Selah and the Spades	Tarit Toll Perilstein	
2019	Harriet	Walter	
2022	Rosaline	Mercutio	
2025	War of the Worlds	David Radford	
TBA	The Collaboration †	Michael Stewart	Post-production

=== Television ===
Year	Title	Role	Appearance
2018	Answers to Everything	Spencer	Episode: "19"
2019	When They See Us	Jermain	3 episodes
2020	Hunters	Cheeks Johnson	7 episodes
2022	The Watcher	Dakota	6 episodes
