= Thommy Kane =

American rock musician and filmmaker (born 1965)

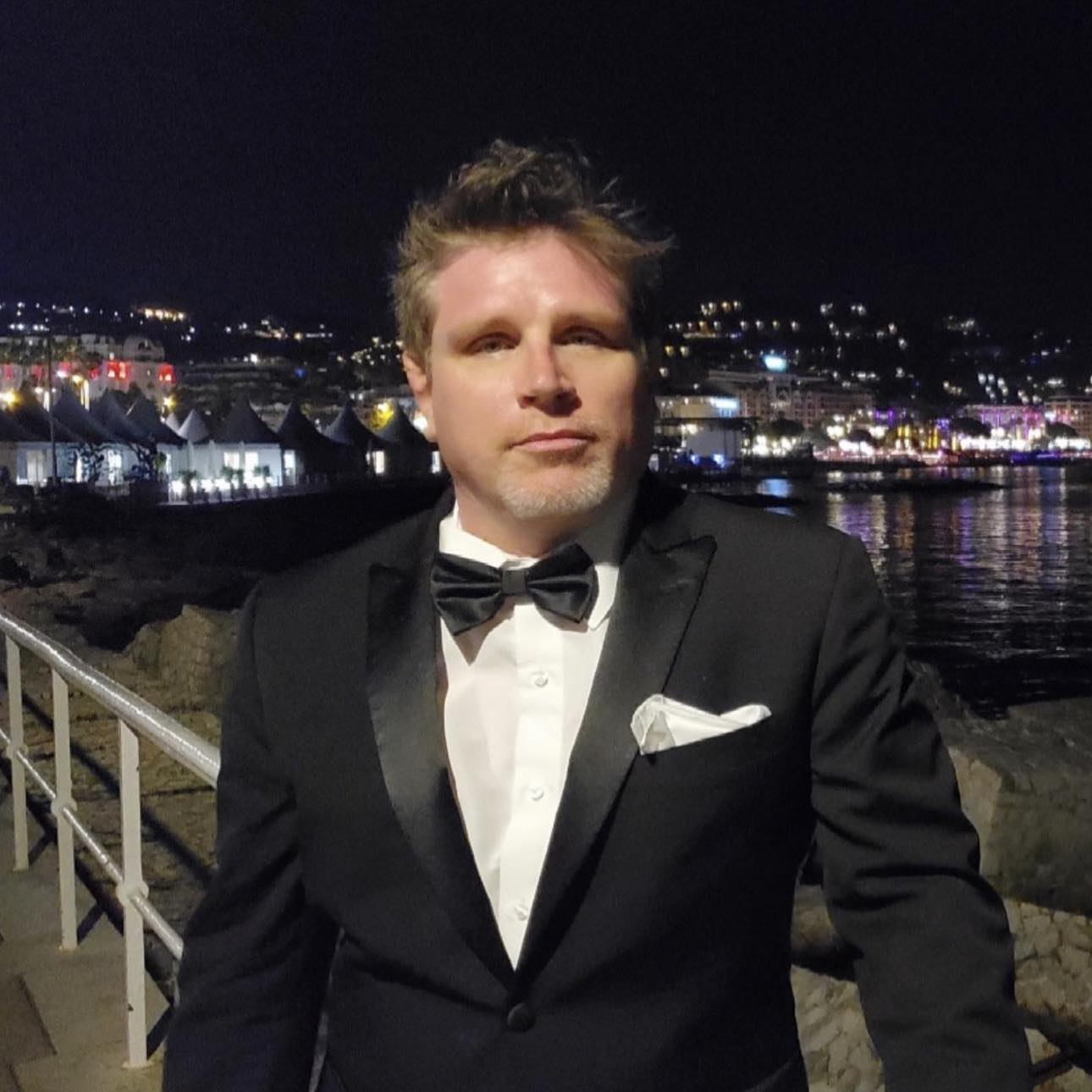
- Kane in April 2023
- Born: Thomas Joseph Abate III; August 20, 1978 (age 47); Methuen, Massachusetts, U.S.
- Other names: Thomas Abate, Poverty
- Occupations: filmmaker; hip hop artist; singer; composer; actor
- Years active: 2002–present
- Musical career
- Genres: Hip Hop
- Instruments: Vocals
- Label: Artistdirect Records
- Website: thommykane.com

Thommy Kane (born Thomas J Abate III; August 20, 1978, in Methuen, Massachusetts), also known as Poverty, is a filmmaker, hip-hop artist, singer, composer and actor in Los Angeles, California.

He was living in a homeless shelter in Maine when he produced a demo that was eventually picked up by Artistdirect records, the offshoot of Interscope Records chief Ted Field. Kane moved to L.A. in 2001 and wrote for Seth Binzer of the rock band Crazy Town. Through his relationship with Binzer, one of Kane's demos ended up on the desk of big wig Jimmy Iovine of Interscope Records. Interscope co-founder Ted Field, now of Artist Direct, eventually won the bidding war to secure the right to produce Kane's music. However, plans to release his album Rise from Ruin foundered in the wake of problems at the label. Kane was approached by Kanye West’s label and also by The Game (rapper). The album was released in March 2004. Artistdirect Records became Radar Records, which eventually became Radar Pictures.

In 2006 Kane had a small role in the film Waist Deep.

In 2022 Kane launched his directorial debut with his short film New Shoes that world premiered at the Cannes Film Festival at the American Pavilion Emerging Director's Showcase. and scored an 8/10 review from Film Threat. The film starred the young actor Jacob Moran who would later be cast in the blockbuster film The Black Phone.
