= Kasi Lemmons =

American actress and director (born 1959)

- Born: Karen Diane Lemmons; February 24, 1959 (age 67); St. Louis, Missouri, U.S.
- Occupations: Actress, film director, writer
- Years active: 1979–present
- Spouse: Vondie Curtis-Hall (m. 1995)
- Children: 2, including Henry Hunter Hall

Kasi Lemmons (/ˈkeɪsi/; born Karen Diane Lemmons, February 24, 1959) is an American film director, screenwriter, and actress. She made her directorial debut with Eve's Bayou (1997), followed by The Caveman's Valentine (2001), Talk to Me (2007), Black Nativity (2013), Harriet (2019), and Whitney Houston: I Wanna Dance with Somebody (2022). In 2007, film scholar Wheeler Winston Dixon called her first three films "deeply resonant personal statements ... Lemmons's work is an ongoing testament to the creative possibilities of film."

As an actress, her film debut was in Spike Lee's School Daze (1988). She continued acting in Vampire's Kiss (1989), The Silence of the Lambs (1991), and Candyman (1992).

== Early life and education ==
Lemmons was born in St. Louis, Missouri, the daughter of Dorothy Othello (née Stallworth) and Milton Francis Lemmons. Her father was a biology teacher and her mother was a counselor who later became a psychologist. In a 2021 episode of Finding Your Roots, Lemmons learned that her third-great-grandfather was transported to the United States from Africa in the early-19th century, and that she was a distant relative of actor Kevin Bacon.

Her parents divorced when she was eight years old. Her mother moved the family to Newton, Massachusetts, because her mother wanted to go to Harvard University to get her doctorate in education. Her mother remarried when Lemmons was nine. Lemmons attended Commonwealth School, a private high school in Boston. In the summers, she attended the New York University's School of Drama's Circle in the Square Program, which trained children who wanted to be professional actors. Through this program, she gained access to the studios of professional actors such as Lee Strasberg and Stella Adler. Alongside her early interest in movies and acting, Lemmons also harbored an interest in directing.

As well as attending New York University's Tisch School of the Arts, UCLA and The New School of Social Research Film Program, Lemmons was awarded an Honorary Degree, Doctor of Humane Letters, from Salem State College in 1998.

== Career ==
=== Acting ===
In 1979, Lemmons made her acting debut in the television movie 11th Victim (1979). She performed with the Boston Children's Theater and later attended New York University's Tisch School of the Arts but transferred to UCLA to major in history. She eventually left UCLA and enrolled in the film program at the New School for Social Research. As a young child, she got her first role on TV on a local soap opera called You Got a Right, a courtroom drama. She played the first and only black girl who integrated to an all-white school. Her acting credits include episodic parts on shows like As the World Turns, Murder, She Wrote, The Cosby Show or ER and films such as Spike Lee's School Daze (1988), Vampire's Kiss (1988), the Academy Award winner for Best Picture The Silence of the Lambs (1991), Candyman (1992), Hard Target (1993), Fear of a Black Hat (1993), Gridlock'd (1997) and 'Til There Was You (1997).

=== Filmmaking ===
In 1997, Lemmons directed the film Eve's Bayou starring Samuel L. Jackson, Lynn Whitfield, Debbi Morgan, Diahann Carroll, and Jurnee Smollett. Lemmons began writing the screenplay for Eve's Bayou in 1992. It was the first screenplay she had written by herself. To convince studios that she could direct Eve's Bayou, she filmed Dr. Hugo, a short film based on a section of the script of Eve's Bayou. Eve's Bayou was well-received among critics (currently holding an 80% rate of approval on review aggregator site Rotten Tomatoes) and won Lemmons an Independent Spirit Award for Best First Feature as well as a National Board of Review award for Outstanding Directorial Debut. It was the highest-grossing independent film in 1997.

In 2001 she directed Jackson again in The Caveman's Valentine about a schizophrenic homeless man trying to solve a murder mystery. In 2002 Lemmons conceived and helmed the tribute to Sidney Poitier for the 74th Annual Academy Award show. Shortly afterwards it was announced that Lemmons would direct The Battle of Cloverfield, a supernatural thriller, from her own script for Columbia Pictures.

In 2007, she directed Talk to Me that was centered around the television personality and activist Ralph Waldo "Petey" Greene Jr., played by Don Cheadle. For the film, Lemmons received the NAACP Image Awards for Outstanding Directing in a Motion Picture and was named as Best Director by the African-American Film Critics Association. In a 2007 interview with FF2 Media's Jan Lisa Huttner, Lemmons said Talk to Me "became a film about a time when change was possible and even revolution was possible. We didn't know what was going to happen. It was a very devastating time and a very frightening time, but it was alive. It was alive."

Lemmons adapted the Broadway musical Black Nativity and filmed it in 2013. It starred Academy Award winners Forest Whitaker and Jennifer Hudson, as well as Academy Award nominee Angela Bassett.

Lemmons's 2019 film Harriet, a biographical film about Harriet Tubman, premiered at the Toronto International Film Festival. Its star, Cynthia Erivo, was nominated for an Academy Award. Lemmons said to the Los Angeles Times about her research for Harriet: "All the elements of a great adventure film are right there in the Harriet Tubman story. It's about a woman who was running a whole lot of her life so action did not have to be imposed. It's inherent. The jeopardy, the movement, the courage, that's all inherent and we wanted to let that play out on screen because we need our female hero stories. This one is about a tiny black woman who did incredible things."

In August 2021, Lemmons was brought on to direct Whitney Houston: I Wanna Dance with Somebody, a Whitney Houston biopic for Sony Pictures, Compelling Pictures and Muse of Fire Productions from a script by Bohemian Rhapsody scribe Anthony McCarten.

Lemmons explained during an interview that she considered writing to be central to her task as a director: "I've been writing scripts all the time, pretty much every day for fourteen years.... I have to write scripts, because that's the only way I can write parts that will get a lot of people whom I really want to work with involved."

She also directed the Netflix limited series Self Made (2020) and one episode of ABC's Women of the Movement (2022).

=== Teaching ===
Lemmons has worked extensively as a mentor and educator. She has been a board member of Film Independent and has contributed to Film Independent's Filmmaker Labs as a speaker and moderator. She also continues to serve as an advisor to the Sundance Screenwriter and Filmmaker Labs. Guest lecturing and speaking engagements include Yale University, Columbia Film School, MIT, UCLA, USC, The Los Angeles Film School and The University of Pristina Film School in Kosovo. Kasi was Vassar College's 2008 Artist in Residence and in the 2010–2011 academic year, Lemmons was the UCLA Regents’ Lecturer in the School of Theater, Film & Television. She was also the leader/moderator of the AFI curriculum's core class, Narrative Workshop.

She is an Associate Arts Professor at New York University's Tisch School of the Arts.

=== Opera ===
Lemmons adapted the novel Fire Shut Up in My Bones by Charles Blow into an opera libretto for the composer Terence Blanchard. It was premiered by the Opera Theatre of Saint Louis on June 15, 2019, and opened the 2021–2022 Metropolitan Opera season, becoming that institution's first opera by an African-American composer.

== Personal life ==
Lemmons has been married to actor and director Vondie Curtis-Hall since 1995. The couple have two children, including actor Henry Hunter Hall.

Lemmons says she is primarily an artist: "I don't wake up every day saying I'm a black woman because it's too given, but I wake up every day feeling like an artist and I feel I'm an artist".

== Filmography ==
=== Film ===
Year	Title	Notes
1996	Dr. Hugo	Short film
1997	Eve's Bayou	
2001	The Caveman's Valentine	
2007	Talk to Me	
2013	Black Nativity	
2019	Harriet	
2022	Whitney Houston: I Wanna Dance with Somebody	Also executive producer

Acting roles

Year	Title	Role	Notes
1988	School Daze	Perry	
1988	Vampire's Kiss	Jackie	
1989	A Man Called Hawk	Lois	
1991	The Silence of the Lambs	Ardelia Mapp	
1991	The Five Heartbeats	Cookie	
1992	Candyman	Bernadette "Bernie" Walsh	
1993	Fear of a Black Hat	Nina Blackburn	
1993	Hard Target	Det. Marie Mitchell	
1994	Override		Short film
1994	Drop Squad	June Vanderpool	
1997	Gridlock'd	Madonna	
1997	'Til There Was You	Angenelle	
1997	Liars' Dice	Teresa	
2006	Waist Deep	Angry Black Woman	
2012	Disconnect	Roberta Washington	
2026	The Projectionist	Ramona	

=== Television ===
Year	Title	Notes
2017	Shots Fired	Episode "Hour Five: Before the Storm"
2018	Luke Cage	Episode "All Souled Out"
2020	Self Made	Also executive producer Episodes "The Fight of the Century" and "Bootstraps"
2022	Women of the Movement	Episode "The Last Word"

Acting roles

Year	Title	Role	Notes
1985	Spenser for Hire	Lydia Wilson	Episode "Resurrection"
1988	The Equalizer	Zandili	Episode "Day of the Covenant"
1993	Murder, She Wrote	Paula Raynor	Episode "The Survivor"
1993	Walker, Texas Ranger	Diane Warren	Episode "Night of the Gladiator"
1995	Zooman	Grace	TV movie
2002	ER	Chemo Tech	Episode "It's All In Your Head"

== Awards and nominations ==
Year	Award	Category	Nominee	Result
1997	NBR Award	Outstanding Directorial Debut	Eve's Bayou	Won
1998	Black Film Award	Best Director	Eve's Bayou	Won
1998	Independent Spirit Award	Best First Feature (Shared with Samuel L. Jackson (producer), Caldecot Chubb (producer))	Eve's Bayou	Won
1998	OFTA Film Award	Best First Feature Film	Eve's Bayou	Nominated
1998	Palm Springs International Film Festival	Director's Achievement Award	Herself	Won
2007	AAFCA Award	Best Director	Talk to Me	Won
2007	EDA Special Mention Award	Best Leap from Actress to Director	Talk to Me	Nominated
2007	EDA Film Focus Award	Best Woman Director	Talk to Me	Nominated
2007	WFCC Award	Best Movie by a Woman (Tied with Sarah Polley for Away from Her (2006))	Talk to Me	Won
2008	Image Award	Outstanding Directing in a Motion Picture (Theatrical or Television)	Talk to Me	Won
2014	Hollywood Award	Best Screenplay	Black Nativity	Nominated
2014	Black Reel	Outstanding Screenplay (Adapted or Original), Motion Picture	Black Nativity	Nominated
2019	Black Film Critics Circle	Best Director	Harriet	Won
2019	Black Film Critics Circle	Best Picture	Harriet	Nominated
2019	Mill Valley Film Festival	Mind the Gap Award	Harriet	Won
2019	Philadelphia Film Critics Circle Awards	Elaine May Award	Harriet	Won
2019	Women Film Critics Circle Awards	Best Movie by a Woman	Harriet	Won
2019	Women Film Critics Circle Awards	Josephine Baker Award	Harriet	Won
2019	Women Film Critics Circle Awards	Karen Morley Award	Harriet	Won
2020	AARP Movies for Grownups Awards	Best Screenwriter	Harriet	Nominated
2020	Black Reel	Outstanding Director	Harriet	Nominated
2020	Image Award	Outstanding Directing in a Motion Picture (Film)	Harriet	Nominated
2020	Image Award	Outstanding Writing in a Motion Picture (Film)	Harriet	Nominated
2020	Image Award	Outstanding Motion Picture	Harriet	Nominated
