= Vondie Curtis-Hall =

American actor and director

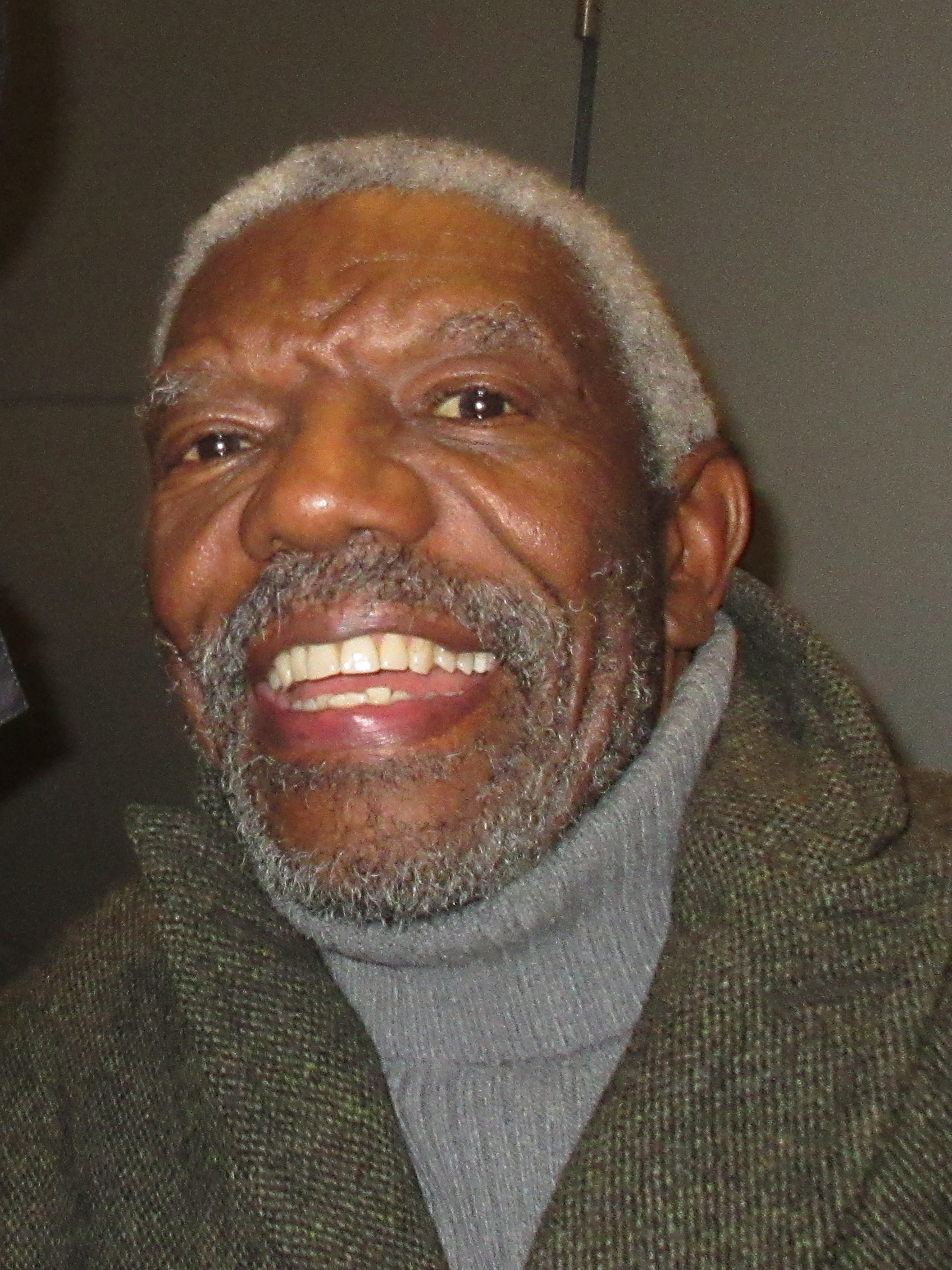
- Curtis-Hall in 2019
- Occupations: Actor, director
- Spouse: Kasi Lemmons (m. 1995)
- Children: 4, including Henry Hunter Hall
- Relatives: Kevan Hall (brother)

Vondie Curtis-Hall is an American actor, film director, and television director. As an actor, he is known for his role as Dr. Dennis Hancock on the CBS medical drama Chicago Hope (1995–1999) and Ben Urich in the Marvel Cinematic Universe series Daredevil (2015). He wrote and directed the cult film Gridlock'd (1997).

== Career ==
Initially a stage actor, Curtis-Hall was a member of the original cast of the Broadway musical Dreamgirls. He originated the role of Marty, James "Thunder" Early's original manager. Curtis-Hall has appeared in numerous films including One Good Cop, Passion Fish, Sugar Hill, Falling Down, Coming To America, Crooklyn, Drop Squad, Eve's Bayou, Turn It Up and William Shakespeare's Romeo + Juliet. His credits as a director include the films Gridlock'd, Glitter, Redemption: The Stan Tookie Williams Story, Waist Deep, as well as episodes of television shows The Shield, Firefly, Chicago Hope, and MDs. In 2000, Vondie Curtis-Hall and Danny Glover (who later portrayed Marty in the film adaptation of Dreamgirls) both appeared in the TNT made-for-television movie Freedom Song. In 2019 Curtis-Hall appeared in the film Harriet, where, according to one reviewer, "Vondie Curtis-Hall gives one of the finest performances of his long career as Reverend Green."

He has had recurring roles on TV series such as Soul Food, I'll Fly Away, and ER. His one-time role as a transgender suicidal patient on ER earned him an Emmy Award nomination for Outstanding Guest Actor in a Drama Series; later in that series he appeared in a recurring role as Roger McGrath.

His most prominent television role as an actor to date is as supporting character Dennis Hancock on the medical drama Chicago Hope. Curtis-Hall portrayed Ben Urich in the Netflix series Daredevil. He also appeared in an episode of The Sopranos.

== Personal life ==
Curtis-Hall is a full-time arts professor at New York University Tisch School of the Arts.

== Filmography ==
=== Film ===
Year	Title	Role	Notes
1988	Shakedown	Speaker (voice)	
1988	Coming to America	Basketball Game Vendor	
1989	Mystery Train	Ed	Segment: "Lost in Space"
1989	Black Rain	Detective	
1990	Die Hard 2	Miller	
1991	One Good Cop	Father Wills	
1991	Healing Hurts		
1992	The Mambo Kings	Miguel Montoya	
1992	Passion Fish	Sugar LeDoux	
1993	Falling Down	Not Economically Viable Man	
1993	Sugar Hill	Mark Doby	
1994	Crooklyn	Uncle Brown	
1994	Clear and Present Danger	Voice-Print Analyst	
1994	Drop Squad	Rocky Seavers	
1995	Tuesday Morning Ride	Carver	Short film
1996	Broken Arrow	Chief Sam Rhodes	
1996	Heaven's Prisoners	Minos P. Dautrieve	
1996	Romeo + Juliet	Captain Prince	
1996	Dr. Hugo	Dr. Hugo	Short film
1997	Gridlock'd	D-Reper	
1997	Eve's Bayou	Julian Grayraven	
2000	Turn It Up	Cliff	
2007	Talk to Me	Sunny Jim Kelsey	
2007	Honeydripper	Slick	
2008	Crenshaw Nights	Frank "Jupiter" Johnson	Short film
2009	Life Is Hot in Cracktown	Dixon	
2009	Bad Lieutenant: Port of Call New Orleans	James Brasser	
2013	Black Nativity	Pawnbroker	
2015	Cymbeline	Caius Lucius	
2015	Experimenter	Thomas Shine	
2018	Come Sunday	J.D. Ellis	
2018	The Row		Short film
2018	Breaking Brooklyn	Greg Bryant	
2019	Harriet	Reverend Green	
2020	The Night House	Mel	
2021	Residue	Reverend Washington	
2021	Blue Bayou	Barry Boucher	
2021	18½	Samuel	
2022	Raymond & Ray	Reverend West	
2024	The Supremes at Earl's All-You-Can-Eat	Lester	
2024	Sheepdog	Whitney St. Germain	
2026	The Projectionist	Sully	
2027	The Last Resort	Sam	Post-production

=== Television ===
Year	Title	Role	Notes
1989	A Man Called Hawk	Tracton	Episode: "The Master's Mirror"
1990	Heat Wave	Clifford Turpin	TV movie
1990	Cop Rock	Cmdr. Warren Osborne	Main cast; 10 episodes
1991	China Beach	Bill	Episode: "Through and Through"
1991	...And Then She Was Gone	Det. Gary Hopkins	TV movie
1991	The Trials of Rosie O'Neill	Dr. Varrick	Episode: "For Love or Money"
1992	Murder Without Motive: The Edmund Perry Story	C. Yernon Mason	TV movie
1992	What She Doesn't Know	Vinnie	TV movie
1992	Nightmare Cafe	Thomas	Episode: "Sanctuary for a Child"
1992	Civil Wars	Jack Turrentine	Episode: "The Old Man and the 'C'"
1992–1993	I'll Fly Away	Joe Clay	6 episodes
1993	There Was a Little Boy	Danforth	TV movie
1993	Fallen Angels	David O'Connor	Episode: "Dead-End for Delia"
1994	L.A. Law	Eugene Clay	Episode: "Three on a Patch"
1994	South Central	James Mosely	Episode: "Dad"
1994	Dead Man's Revenge	Jessup Bush	TV movie
1994	Keys	Louche Amarant	TV movie
1994	Zooman	Davis	TV movie
1994–2001	ER	Henry Colton / Rena / Roger McGrath	8 episodes
1995–1999	Chicago Hope	Dr. Dennis Hancock	Main cast; 104 episodes
1997	Don King: Only in America	Lloyd Price	TV movie
1999	Sirens	Vincent Morgan	TV movie
2000	Freedom Song	Daniel Wall	TV movie
2000	Ali: An American Hero	Drew "Bundini" Brown	TV movie
2002	The Sopranos	Maurice Tiffen	Episode: "Watching Too Much Television"
2002–2003	Fastlane	Andre Hayes	2 episodes
2003	1-800-Missing	Agent Vic Martinsen	Episode: "Pilot"
2004	Deceit	Detective Hal Kazin	TV movie
2004	Dense	Ross	TV short
2004	Soul Food	Charles Miller	6 episodes
2005	LAX	Dele Ekoku	Episode: "Cease & Assist"
2006	Law & Order	Dr. Andrew Copelan	Episode: "Positive"
2007	Medium	Scanlon's Friend	Episode: "Second Opinion"
2009	Fear Itself	Walter Markham	Episode: "Chance"
2009	Criminal Minds	Stanley Usher	Episode: "Cold Comfort"
2010	Lens on Talent		Episode: "Taking on Different Hats"
2011	Law & Order: SVU	Dwight Talcott	Episode: "Reparations"
2011	A Gifted Man	Dennis Jones	Episode: "In Case of Missed Communication"
2012	NYC 22	Fred Wheeler	Episode: "Self Cleaning Oven"
2014	Chasing Life	Lawrence	3 episodes
2014	Tin Man	Jack Garrison	TV movie
2015	Daredevil	Benjamin "Ben" Urich	Main cast (season 1); 9 episodes
2015–2017	Rosewood	Beaumont Rosewood Sr.	3 episodes
2016	Spark	Philippe Lavelle	1 episode
2018–2019	For the People	Chief Judge Nicholas Byrne	Main cast; 20 episodes
2019	Evil	Leon Acosta	Episode: "2 Fathers"
2022–2025	The Recruit	Walter Nyland	Main cast; 14 episodes
2023	Justified: City Primeval	Marcus "Sweety" Sweeton	Main cast; 8 episodes
2025	Death by Lightning	Frederick Douglass	2 episodes: "Party Faithful", "Casus Belli"
2026	Daredevil: Born Again	Benjamin "Ben" Urich	Photograph, 2 episodes: "The Northern Star", "The Southern Cross"

=== Director ===
Film

- Gridlock'd (1997)
- Glitter (2001)
- Waist Deep (2006)

Music video

- "Never Too Far", for Mariah Carey

TV series

Year	Title	Notes
2001-2002	ER	Episodes "Start All Over Again" and "It's All in Your Head"
2002	Firefly	Episode "Our Mrs. Reynolds"
2002	MDs	Episode "Cruel and Unusual"
2005	The Shield	Episode "Insurgents"
2006	Sleeper Cell	Episode "Torture"
2008	Boston Legal	Episode "Glow in the Dark"
2008	Gossip Girl	Episode "Pret-a-Poor-J"
2008	The Starter Wife	Episode "Das Booty Call"

TV movies

- Redemption: The Stan Tookie Williams Story (2004)
- Abducted: The Carlina White Story (2012)
- Toni Braxton: Unbreak My Heart (2016)
- Faith Under Fire: The Antoinette Tuff Story (2018)
