= Cynthia Erivo =

British actress and singer (born 1987)

Cynthia Erivo MBE
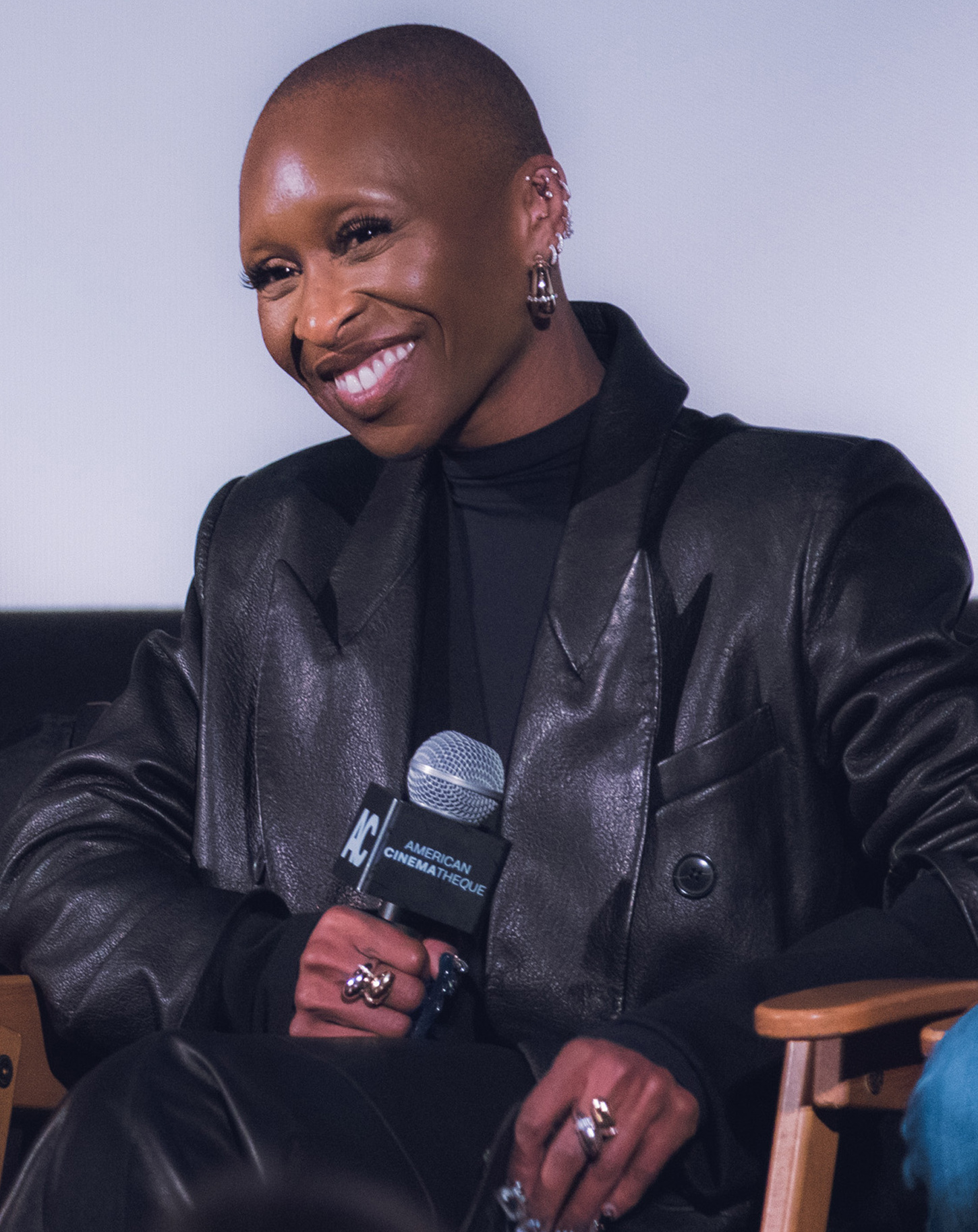
- Erivo in 2025
- Born: Cynthia Chinasaokwu Onyedinmanasu Owezuke Amarachukwu Echeumuna Erivo; 8 January 1987 (age 39); London, England
- Education: Royal Academy of Dramatic Art
- Occupations: Actress; singer; songwriter; record producer; author
- Years active: 2010–present
- Awards: Full list
- Musical career
- Genres: R&B; soul; urban contemporary; gospel; Broadway
- Instrument: Vocals
- Labels: Verve; Republic
- Website: www.cynthiaerivo.com

Cynthia Chinasaokwu Onyedinmanasu Owezuke Amarachukwu Echeumuna Erivo (/əˈriːvoʊ/ ə-REE-voh; born 8 January 1987) is a British actress and singer-songwriter. Known for her work on both stage and screen, she is the recipient of several accolades and one of few individuals nominated for an Emmy, a Grammy, an Oscar, and a Tony Award (EGOT), winning all but the Oscar. Erivo was appointed Member of the Order of the British Empire (MBE) in the 2026 New Year Honours for services to music and drama.

Erivo made her West End debut in the stage musical The Umbrellas of Cherbourg (2011), and her Broadway debut as Celie in the musical revival of The Color Purple (2015–2017). Erivo's work for The Color Purple won her the Tony Award for Best Actress in a Musical and Grammy Award for Best Musical Theater Album, as well as a Daytime Emmy Award.

She expanded to films in 2018 with the crime thrillers Widows and Bad Times at the El Royale. Erivo earned nominations for the Academy Award for Best Actress for portraying Harriet Tubman in Harriet (2019) and Elphaba in Wicked (2024), as well as a nomination for Best Original Song for the song "Stand Up" from the former. For reprising her role as Elphaba in Wicked: For Good (2025), she became the first black actress to be nominated twice for Best Actress in a Motion Picture – Musical or Comedy at the Golden Globe Awards. Erivo's rendition of "Defying Gravity" with Ariana Grande from the Wicked soundtrack won her a second Grammy Award.

On television, Erivo portrayed Holly Gibney in the HBO crime drama miniseries The Outsider (2020) and Aretha Franklin in National Geographic's anthology series Genius: Aretha (2021); the latter earned her a nomination for the Primetime Emmy Award for Outstanding Lead Actress in a Limited or Anthology Series or Movie. As a singer, she has released singles as well as two solo albums in 2021 and 2025. In late 2025, Erivo published her first book, Simply More: A Book for Anyone Who Has Been Told They're Too Much, through Macmillan.

== Early life ==
Cynthia Chinasaokwo Onyedinmanasu Owezuke Amarachukwu Echeumuna Erivo was born on 8 January 1987 to Igbo Nigerian immigrant parents in Stockwell, London, England. Her mother, Edith, was 15 years old when the Nigerian Civil War broke out, with Erivo saying that "she's not necessarily a refugee, but [...] her home was ravaged, and they were on the run to find safety." Both of Erivo's parents arrived in the UK in their early twenties and they separated when she was very young. Following this, she and her younger sister Stephanie were raised by Edith, who worked as a nurse. They were disowned by their father when Erivo was 16 years old, and she remains estranged from him. She named her production company Edith's Daughter in tribute to her mother.

Erivo attended La Retraite Roman Catholic Girls' School in Clapham Park. Her confirmation name is Perpetua. As a child, she had roles in Bertolt Brecht's Caucasian Chalk Circle, and later appeared on television in Trust Me, I'm a Teenager. She began a music psychology degree at the University of East London in 2004. However, a year into her degree, she applied to the Royal Academy of Dramatic Art (RADA) and transferred there upon acceptance. She graduated from RADA with a bachelor's degree in acting in 2010.

== Career ==
=== 2011–2017: Early career and The Color Purple ===
Erivo first appeared in roles on British television programmes such as Chewing Gum and The Tunnel. Her first stage role was in Marine Parade by Simon Stephens at the 2010 Brighton Festival. Her first musical role was in John Adams' and June Jordan's I Was Looking at the Ceiling and Then I Saw the Sky at Theatre Royal Stratford East. On Sunday, 9 December 2012, Cynthia appeared in Alexander S. Bermange's and Stephen Clark's Living Every Day, which was performed as part of The 24 Hour Musicals Celebrity Gala at the Old Vic in London's West End.

In 2013, Erivo played the role of Celie Harris in the Menier Chocolate Factory production of The Color Purple, a role which Whoopi Goldberg originated onscreen. Erivo had previously portrayed Sister Mary Clarence / Deloris Van Cartier in a UK tour of the stage musical Sister Act, which Goldberg had also originated in its film adaptation. She is also featured on the soundtrack to the musical drama film Beyond the Lights, co-writing and performing the song "Fly Before You Fall".

Erivo originated the role of Chenice in the West End musical I Can't Sing!, which opened at the London Palladium on 26 March 2014, garnering mixed reviews. The production closed on 10 May, just six weeks and three days after its official opening night. Erivo starred in the European premiere of Dessa Rose at London's Trafalgar Studios from July to August 2014, for which she was nominated as Best Leading Actress in a musical at the 2015 BroadwayWorld UK Awards.

She made her Broadway debut in the 2015 revival transfer of the Menier Chocolate Factory production of The Color Purple, reprising her role as Celie Harris alongside American actresses Jennifer Hudson as Shug Avery and Danielle Brooks as Sofia. The production began performances at Bernard B. Jacobs Theatre, from 10 December 2015. Her performance earned widespread acclaim, with The New York Times writing, "Ms. Erivo's sobering and stirring portrayal of Celie, in a rapturously reviewed revival of The Color Purple... has brought the kind of praise that can change a performer's career". She won several awards for her performance, including the 2016 Tony Award for Best Actress in a Musical.

Erivo starred as Cathy alongside Joshua Henry in a one-night benefit concert performance of Jason Robert Brown's The Last Five Years on 12 September 2016. Proceeds from the performance went to the Brady Center, a national gun violence organisation. In February 2017, at the 59th Annual Grammy Awards, Erivo performed "God Only Knows" alongside John Legend, as a tribute to musicians who had died over the past year.

In April 2017, Erivo and the cast of The Color Purple won a Daytime Emmy Award for Outstanding Musical Performance in a Daytime Program, following their performance on NBC's The Today Show in May 2016. In November 2017, she appeared on the charity benefit Night of Too Many Stars, hosted by Jon Stewart, where she performed the Andra Day song "Rise Up" in a duet with Jodi DiPiazza, accompanied by Questlove and The Roots.

=== 2018–2023: Transition to film ===
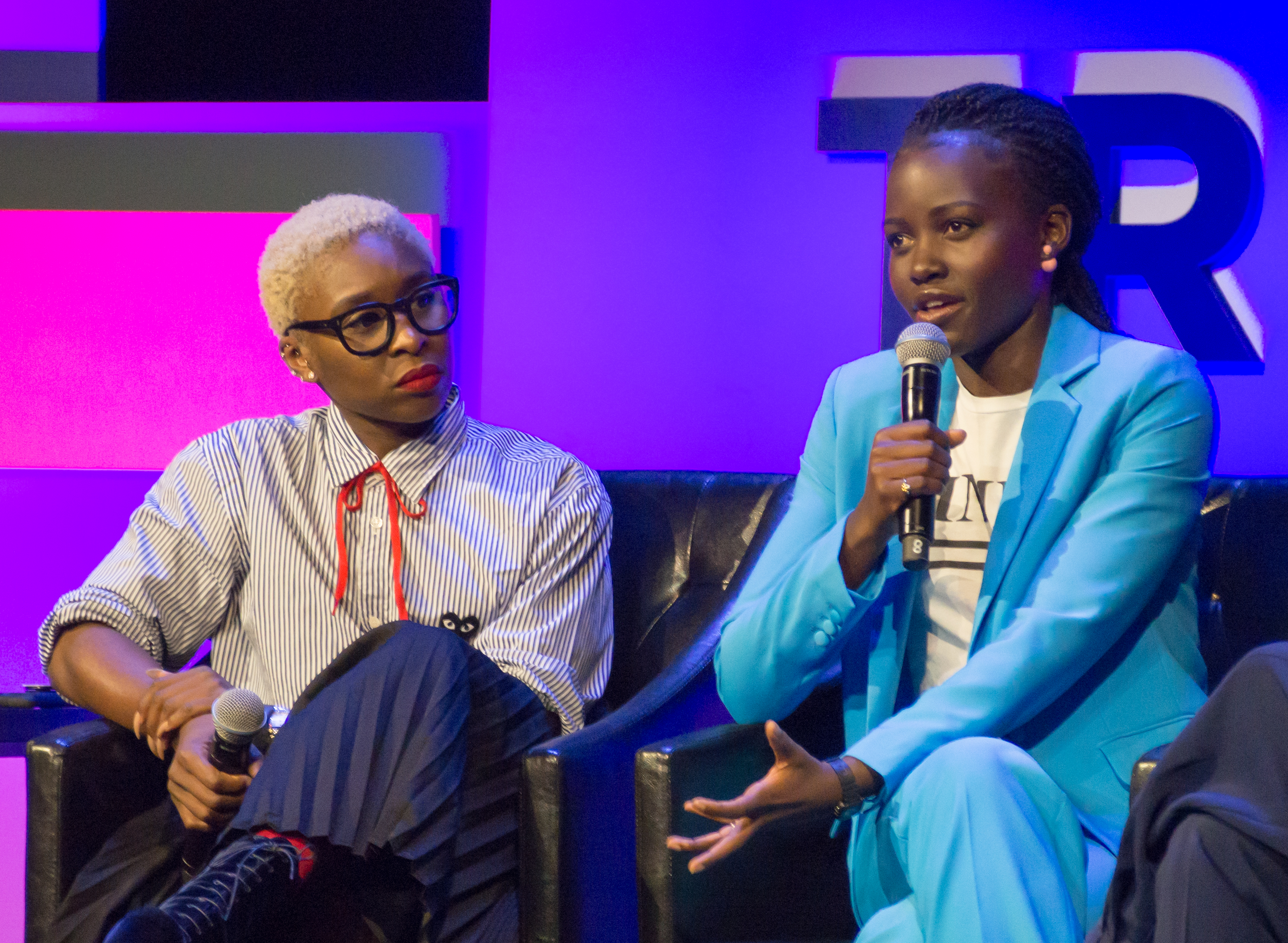
Erivo with Lupita Nyong'o at the 2018 Tribeca Film Festival

Erivo made her film debut in 2018 with the neo-noir thriller film Bad Times at the El Royale. Justin Chang of the Los Angeles Times deemed Erivo's performance "revelatory in the most rewarding sense". That same year, she also starred in the Steve McQueen directed heist thriller film Widows, which marked the first film she had ever shot. In his review of the film for The Atlantic, David Sims highlighted Erivo's "incredible work" in portraying her character's dramatic transformation. In 2019, Erivo produced and starred in the scripted science fiction thriller podcast Carrier, voicing the lead role of Raylene Watts, a long-haul truck driver transporting a trailer with "disturbing, mysterious contents".

Erivo played the title role in Harriet, a biographical film about American abolitionist Harriet Tubman. The film began production in October 2018, completed filming in January 2019, and was released on 1 November 2019. David Rooney of The Hollywood Reporter wrote that Erivo "is a powerful physical presence in the title role" adding that "[she] hits all the requisite notes of flintiness and selfless bravery born of suffering, determination and rage". Her performance earned her a nomination for the Golden Globe Award for Best Actress in a Motion Picture – Drama; she also received a second nomination for Best Original Song for a song she co-wrote and performed for the film entitled "Stand Up". In 2020, Erivo garnered nominations for two Academy Awards–one for Best Actress for her portrayal of Tubman and the other for Best Original Song for "Stand Up". She became the third consecutive and overall person to earn acting and songwriting nominations for the same film, after Mary J. Blige for Mudbound (2017) and Lady Gaga for A Star Is Born (2018), and was the second consecutive and overall person (as well as the first person of color) to do so in a leading role.

In 2020, Erivo starred as investigator Holly Gibney in the HBO miniseries The Outsider, a television adaptation of Stephen King's novel of the same name. That same year, she launched her production company, Edith's Daughter, and signed a first-look deal with MRC to develop television projects. She appeared in the science fiction film Chaos Walking, based on Patrick Ness' novel The Knife of Never Letting Go, which was released on 5 March 2021. Erivo portrayed singer Aretha Franklin in the third season of the anthology series Genius, which premiered in March 2021. While the season was met with criticism from Franklin's family, Erivo was praised for her performance, earning Best Actress nominations at the Primetime Emmy Awards, Golden Globe Awards, Critics' Choice Awards, and Screen Actors Guild Awards. She released two songs, "The Good" and "Glowing Up", to promote her debut studio album, Ch. 1 Vs. 1, which was released on 7 September 2021. That same month, she joined the jury of the 78th Venice International Film Festival.

In July 2022, Erivo performed as part of the BBC Proms, singing tributes to women who have inspired her. Writing in The Times, John Bungey highlighted her performances of the songs "The First Time Ever I Saw Your Face" and "Ain't No Way". That same year, she performed a medley of Stephen Sondheim songs during the In Memoriam segment at the 64th Annual Grammy Awards, alongside Rachel Zegler, Leslie Odom Jr. and Ben Platt. Althea Legaspi of Rolling Stone described it as both "moving" and "fitting" tribute.

Erivo played the Blue Fairy in Disney's 2022 live-action adaptation of Pinocchio, directed by Robert Zemeckis. Despite the film's negative reception, Christy Lemire of RogerEbert.com praised her performance, writing: "Erivo is such a majestic sight to behold, you'll wish there were more of her here". Later that year, she performed the song "Edelweiss" from the musical The Sound of Music in tribute to Julie Andrews, who received the AFI Life Achievement Award.

In 2023, she appeared in the Netflix crime thriller Luther: The Fallen Sun, a film continuation of the crime drama series Luther starring Idris Elba. In the same year, Erivo portrayed Jacqueline, a Liberian refugee, in the film Drift, which she also produced. Erivo took inspiration from her mother's experience as a refugee during the Nigerian Civil War for the role. The following year, she played Petra, a bold and flirtatious maid, in the Lincoln Center concert production of Stephen Sondheim's A Little Night Music at David Geffen Hall. She paid tribute to Dionne Warwick at the Kennedy Center Honors where she sang a rendition of "Alfie" from the 1966 film of the same name.

=== 2024–present: Wicked and worldwide recognition ===
In February 2024, Erivo was appointed vice-president of her alma mater, the Royal Academy of Dramatic Art.

Erivo portrayed Elphaba in the 2024 musical fantasy film Wicked, the first of a two-part film adaptation of the stage musical. She earned acclaim for the role, with Wendy Ide of The Guardian writing: "Erivo is terrific, her rich, velvety voice cracking under the weight of rejections and ridicule suffered by Elphaba." For her performance, Erivo received Best Actress nominations at the Golden Globes, Critics' Choice Awards, British Academy Film Awards, Screen Actors Guild Awards (where she also received a nomination for Outstanding Performance by a Cast), and Academy Awards. Her Academy Award nomination made her the second black actress after Viola Davis to receive more than one Best Actress nominations. The film's soundtrack album was co-billed to Erivo, who performed seven songs from the musical. It debuted at number two on the US Billboard 200 chart and gave Erivo her first UK top-ten hit with her rendition of "Defying Gravity".

In May 2025, it was announced that Erivo would return to the West End in a one-woman adaptation of Dracula at the Noël Coward Theatre, performing all 23 roles. It ran from 4 February to 31 May 2026 and was produced by Michael Cassel and Adam Kenwright, who produced the one-woman production of The Picture of Dorian Gray starring Sarah Snook. It featured an original song composed by Clemence Williams.

On 8 June 2025, Erivo hosted the 78th Tony Awards on CBS, where she received positive reviews. Deadline Hollywood declared her hosting abilities to be "absolutely flawless", while Entertainment Weekly cited her as one of the show's highlights, saying: "From the opening seconds, Erivo defied expectations" adding, "Throughout the ceremony, she played to her strengths and it made for a superb outing as a host". The ceremony drew 4.85 million viewers, becoming the most-viewed Tonys ceremony since 2019.

In August 2025, Erivo starred as the title role in a revival of Jesus Christ Superstar for a three-night run at the Hollywood Bowl.

Erivo hosted an episode of Saturday Night Live UK in October 2026, appearing alongside alongside Ayoade Bamgboye and Hammed Animashaun in the "Nigerian Wicked" Nollywood parody sketch which went viral, receiving over five million views on YouTube within a week.

== Personal life ==
Erivo is Catholic and has been described as "episodically vegan". She identifies as queer and bisexual. Erivo previously dated actor Dean John-Wilson from 2013 to 2017, and has been dating actress and producer Lena Waithe since late 2024. Erivo enjoys running, and ran the London Marathon in 2022 and 2026, and the New York City Marathon in 2016.

== Acting credits ==
=== Film ===
Key
†	Denotes films that have not yet been released

Year	Title	Role	Notes
2018	Widows	Belle	
2018	Bad Times at the El Royale	Darlene Sweet	
2019	Harriet	Harriet Tubman	
2021	Chaos Walking	Mathilde 'Hildy'	
2021	Needle in a Timestack	Janine Mikkelsen	
2022	Pinocchio	The Blue Fairy	
2023	Drift	Jacqueline Kamara	Also producer
2023	Luther: The Fallen Sun	Odette Raine	
2024	Wicked	Elphaba Thropp	
2025	Wicked: For Good	Elphaba Thropp	
2026	Prima Facie	Tessa Ensler	
2027	Children of Blood and Bone †	Admiral Kaea	Post-production
2027	Karoshi †		Post-production
2027	Bad Fairies †	Jayne Staplegun (voice)	In production
2027	Snoop †	Afeni Shakur	Filming
TBA	The Road Home †	Miriam Makeba	Filming

=== Television ===
Year	Title	Role	Notes	Ref.
2015	Chewing Gum	Magdalene	Episode: "Tolled Road"	
2016	Mr Selfridge	Alberta Hunter	Episodes: #4.1 & #4.2	
2016	The Tunnel	Mel	Episode #2.3	
2017, 2019	Broad City	Lisa	Episodes: "Bedbugs" & "Make the Space"	
2018	The Boss Baby: Back in Business	Turtleneck Superstar CEO Baby (voice)	Episode: "As the Diaper Changes"	
2019	Sunny Day	Dr. Vanessa (voice)	Episode: "Get Her to the Vet"	
2020	The Outsider	Holly Gibney	Miniseries; 8 episodes	
2020	James and the Giant Peach with Taika and Friends	Ladybird	Episode 7	
2020	American Idol	Herself	Episode: "316 (On With the Show: Grand Finale)"	
2021	Genius	Aretha Franklin	Lead role; 8 episodes (season 3)	
2021	RuPaul's Drag Race	Herself (guest judge)	Episode: "Henny, I Shrunk the Drag Queens!"	
2021, 2025	Strictly Come Dancing	Herself (guest judge / mentor)	6 episodes	
2022	Fraggle Rock: Back to the Rock	The Archivist (voice)	Episode: "The Glow"	
2022	Roar	Ambia	Episode: "The Woman Who Found Bite Marks on Her Skin"	
2023	Star Wars: Visions	Kratu (voice)	Episode: "Aau's Song"	
2023	Blue's Clues & You!	Jingles (voice)	Episode: "Josh and Blue's Ice Cream Shoppe"	
2023	HouseBroken	Ferris (voice)	Episode: "Who's Nocturnal?"	
2023	Strange Planet	Dreamer (voice)	Episode: "Key Change"	
2024	Moon Girl and Devil Dinosaur	Dr. Akonam Ojo (voice)	Episode: "Make It, Don't Break It!"	
2025	RoboGobo	The Slink (voice)	Recurring role; 11 episodes	
2025	The Voice	Herself / Advisor	Season 27 for Team Bublé	
2025	Poker Face	Amber / Delia / Cece / Bebe / Felicity Price	Episode: "The Game Is a Foot"	
2025	Big Mouth	Missy's Vagina (voice)	Episode: "Everything We Forgot to Tell You About Sex"	
2025	78th Tony Awards	Herself (host)	Television special	
2025	RuPaul's Drag Race All Stars	Herself (guest judge)	Episode: "Wicked Good"	
2025	Charlotte's Web	Goose (voice)	Miniseries; 3 episodes	
2025	Wicked: One Wonderful Night	Herself - Performer	Television special	
2026	Saturday Night Live UK	Herself (host) / various characters	Series 2 episode 6	

=== Theatre ===
Year	Production	Role	Venue	Ref.
2010	Marine Parade	Various	Brighton Festival	
2010	I Was Looking at the Ceiling and Then I Saw the Sky	Leila	Theatre Royal, Stratford East	
2011	The Umbrellas of Cherbourg	Madeleine	Curve Theatre / Gielgud Theatre, West End	
2011–2012	Sister Act	Deloris Van Cartier / Sister Mary Clarence	UK Tour	
2013	Lift	Lap Dancer	Soho Theatre	
2013	The Color Purple	Celie Harris Johnson	Menier Chocolate Factory, Off-West End	
2014	I Can't Sing! The X Factor Musical	Chenice	London Palladium, West End	
2014	Dessa Rose	Dessa Rose	Trafalgar Studios	
2014–2015	Henry IV	Poins/The Earl of Douglas	Donmar Warehouse, Off-West End	
2015	How to Succeed in Business Without Really Trying	Rosemary Pilkington	Royal Festival Hall	
2015	A Midsummer Night's Dream	Puck	Liverpool Everyman	
2015–2017	The Color Purple	Celie Harris Johnson	Bernard B. Jacobs Theatre, Broadway	
2016	The Last Five Years	Cathy Hiatt	The Town Hall	
2023	Gutenberg! The Musical!	The Producer (one night cameo)	James Earl Jones Theatre, Broadway	
2024	A Little Night Music	Petra	Lincoln Center, New York	
2025	Jesus Christ Superstar	Jesus Christ	Hollywood Bowl, Los Angeles	
2026	Dracula	Dracula, et al.	Noël Coward Theatre, West End	

=== Podcasts ===
Year	Title	Role	Notes	Ref.
2019	Anthem: Homunculus	Joan	Recurring role; 3 episodes	
2019	Carrier	Raylene Watts	Main role; 6 episodes	
2019	The Two Princes	Queen Malkia of the Midlands	Main role; 5 episodes	
2020	Hank the Cowdog	Madame Moonshine	Main role; 6 episodes	
2024	George Orwell's 1984	Julia	Main role; 7 episodes	

== Discography ==
Studio albums

- Ch. 1 vs 1 (2021)
- I Forgive You (2025)

== Awards and nominations ==
Throughout her career, Erivo has received a Daytime Emmy Award, two Grammy Awards, and a Tony Award, and has been nominated for three Academy Awards, two British Academy Film Awards, five Golden Globe Awards, and four Actor Awards.

For the Broadway revival of The Color Purple, Erivo won the 2016 Tony Award for Best Actress in a Musical. The following year, she and the cast of The Color Purple won the Daytime Emmy Award for Outstanding Musical Performance in a Daytime Program and the Grammy Award for Best Musical Theater Album.

Erivo was appointed Member of the Order of the British Empire (MBE) in the 2026 New Year Honours for services to music and drama.
