= Gridlock'd =

1997 film by Vondie Curtis-Hall

- Theatrical release poster
- Directed by: Vondie Curtis-Hall
- Written by: Vondie Curtis-Hall
- Produced by: Damian Jones; Paul Webster; Erica Huggins
- Starring: Tim Roth; Tupac Shakur; Thandiwe Newton
- Cinematography: Bill Pope
- Edited by: Christopher Koefoed
- Music by: Stewart Copeland
- Production companies: PolyGram Filmed Entertainment; Interscope Communications; Def Pictures; Dragon Pictures
- Distributed by: Gramercy Pictures
- Release date: January 29, 1997
- Running time: 91 minutes
- Country: United States
- Language: English
- Budget: $5 million
- Box office: $5.6 million

Gridlock'd is a 1997 American crime black comedy drama film written and directed by Vondie Curtis-Hall in his directorial debut, and starring Tupac Shakur, Tim Roth, Lucy Liu, and Thandiwe Newton. It follows two heroin addicts, who decide to kick the habit following the overdose of their bandmate. They confront the police and local criminals, while bureaucracy prevents them from entering a drug rehabilitation program. Curtis-Hall had a small role for the film.

Shakur died four months before the film's release. The film's opening was relatively low, despite critical acclaim. Its opening weekend netted only $2,678,372 and it finished with a little over $5.5 million.

== Plot ==
Spoon, Stretch, and Cookie are bandmates in the spoken word genre living in Detroit. At midnight on new year's day, Cookie overdoses on her first hit of heroin. After multiple failed attempts to get a ride to the local hospital, the pair carry Cookie there themselves, where they unsuccessfully try to complete submission paperwork for her. In response, the hospital receptionist aggressively refuses to alert a doctor to the emergency. Luckily, a doctor hears the commotion and steps in to take Cookie away to perform surgery on here. While Spoon and Stretch await the results, they think back to a time when Cookie's only vice was smoking cigarettes. A doctor interrupts their reminiscing and allows them to visit an unconscious Cookie. Spoon, upon seeing Cookie in critical condition, declares his intention to kick his addiction.

The two get into an altercation with a local criminal, D-Reper, while trying to make some money and barely escape. They visit their dealer, Mud, who takes offense when Stretch, who is white, uses the n word. As the pair leaves, they see D-Reper going to visit Mud. Back at their shared flat, the two share concerns about rent, which Cookie had been paying for them. This leads Stretch to join Spoon in his plan to get clean. The two fall asleep and dream of Cookie performing some poetry on new year's eve.

Later on new year's day, they go to rehab, where they learn that they either need to get a medicaid card or take an HIV test if they want to get into a rehab program promptly. Even after taking a HIV test though, they're told it'll take over a week to get into rehab. To calm his nerves, Stretch visits Mud to get high, where they learn that Mud owes money to D-Reper.

In the waiting room of a rehab, Spoon and Stretch think back to the promising show they played on new year's eve, but, when they reach the counter, they discover that the rehab only caters to alcoholics and they've wasted their time. Next, they go to the welfare center and request medicaid there. However, they're met with apathy and derision due to their poor planning and once again face long delays before anything could be done. One employee advises them to go to "Woodward and Jefferson" to make quicker progress, but the stresses of the day have left Spoon in need of another fix.

Back at Mud's once again, they find him shot to death, but ignore this in favor of getting high. Raiding his stash, the two shoot up while thinking back on Cookie's decision to try heroin as a means to celebrate their successful show the night before. Stretch pockets the remaining heroin. Upon leaving Mud's, the pair bump into two police officers sent to investigate gunshots heard in the area. After one of the cops gets frustrated with Stretch's vague responses, he jostles him and the bag of heroin falls out of Stretch's pocket. Luckily, the cop doesn't notice and as soon as he walks away, the two grab the bag and flee.

Reaching Woodward and Jefferson, the two find the office they were directed to, where they're redirected back to the center they'd visited previously. After furiously storming out, the duo bump into D-Reper and his henchman, now looking for their missing heroin, but are saved at the last second by the arrival of two cops. Once safe, Spoon wonders how the criminals knew where they were, but Stretch is more concerned with getting into rehab before the end of the day.

While trying to get some food, they see a tv news report announcing them as prime suspects in the killing of Mud and his pregnant partner, Cee-Cee, further increasing the urgency of their plan. Back in the waiting room of the welfare center, Spoon recounts his first, very positive encounter with drugs. When he's called in for his meeting, he's told the only way to get medicaid in one day is to be HIV positive. Returning to the waiting room, Spoon finds Stretch gone, but police officers are present. Spoon ducks into the toilets, where he finds Stretch shooting up again. Stretch admits he's HIV positive, but the two are then interrupted by the police officers happening to wander in. In a panic, Stretch throws the remaining heroin down the toilet before the cops drag him out of the stall. Their arrest is interrupted by an irate war veteran and his pet rottweiler causing a commotion in the waiting room. While the police are distracted dealing with this, Spoon and Stretch run outside, where they find D-Reper and his henchman, who chase them, eventually shooting Stretch, though not fatally. The police officers exit the welfare center, see this and apprehend the criminals, allowing Spoon and Stretch to escape.

Spoon has Stretch stab him multiple times in the abdomen so they'll both be wounded enough for hospitalisation and they return together to the hospital where Cookie is being monitored. There, the receptionist from earlier advises hospital staff not to rush treating them and tells the pair to wait until their names are called. Cookie wakes up, leaves the hospital and calls the flat from a payphone, but gets no response. Assuming the two men are listening but not picking up, Cookie suggests they consider getting clean, referencing programmes she hears are easy to get into quickly. Back in the waiting room, Spoon's name is finally called. The film ends with a full performance of a piece the group did on new year's eve.

== Cast ==
- Tim Roth as Stretch
- Tupac Shakur as Spoon
- Thandie Newton as Cookie
- Charles Fleischer as Mr. Woodson
- Howard Hesseman as Blind Man
- James Pickens Jr. as Supervisor
- John Sayles as Cop #1
- Tom Towles as D-Reper's henchman
- Tom Wright as Koolaid
- Lucy Alexis Liu as Cee-Cee

In addition, Bokeem Woodbine appears repeatedly – though uncredited – as drug dealer Mud, while D Reper is played by the film's writer and director, Vondie Curtis-Hall; Kasi Lemmons and Henry Hunter Hall, Curtis-Hall's wife and then-baby, respectively, appear briefly as the Madonna and Child.

== Production ==
=== Development ===
Curtis-Hall drew from some of his own experiences growing up in Detroit to make the film. During his teenage years, he was a guitarist and vocalist in Detroit's punk rock scene. During this time, he and his peers began using heroin, with Curtis-Hall recounting the drug "was really a competitive thing we did, to be accepted. In order to compete, we thought, we figured we needed the tools to compete with others that were pushing the edge, to play faster, write better songs and sing better. That meant using smack".

Curtis-Hall had kicked the drug by the time he graduated high school in 1974, saying, "One day my best friend, the bassist, and I were sitting around and decided that maybe we could actually play better if we weren't stoned all the time." In the attempt to get clean, Curtis-Hall said that he and his friend sought assistance from public detoxification programs, but were constantly confronted with red tape. He said, "I was living at home and I didn’t want [my parents] to know about it. Because of that I had no address to list on the forms. My friend didn't have a Social Security card. We were like these two homeless kids, running through this maze. You have a small window of time, or you’ll never kick."

=== Casting and financing ===
Curtis-Hall said it was not easy to get the film financed because of its taboo subject of heroin, "and people were expecting it to be a real depressing movie about a couple of dope fiends." He took the project to Live Entertainment, PolyGram Films and Def Pictures, a subsidiary of PolyGram. At the time, PolyGram had just released Trainspotting and told Curtis-Hall, "'We can't do two movies about heroin'...Then Tupac's record company came up with the money and PolyGram turned around and said, 'Hey, we always liked this movie' [laughs]."

Roth requested to be in the film upon reading the script after starring in Rob Roy. Tupac was cast after Laurence Fishburne, the director's first choice, was not available. The rapper was recommended to Curtis-Hall by Preston Holmes, the president of Def Pictures. Said Curtis-Hall, "Pac had just gotten out of jail [after a 1995 sexual abuse conviction in New York] and no one wanted to touch him. But Preston, who had known Tupac since he was a child, said that he was a professional, and nothing like the perception Hollywood had of him. I met him, liked him, hooked him up with Tim, and there was immediate chemistry."

== Soundtrack ==
Year	Album	Peak chart positions	Certifications
Year	Album	U.S.	Certifications
1997	Gridlock'd: Released: January 28, 1997; Label: Death Row Records, Interscope	1	US: Gold

== Release ==
Gridlock'd premiered on January 31, 1997, finishing at #10 at the box office in North America on the opening weekend, and went on to a total gross of $5.6 million during the domestic run. The film was released in the United Kingdom on May 30, 1997.

== Reception ==
On the review aggregator website Rotten Tomatoes, 88% of 33 critics' reviews are positive, with an average rating of 6.7/10. The New York Times editor Janet Maslin praised Shakur's performance: "He played this part with an appealing mix of presence, confidence and humor". Desson Howe, for the Washington Post, wrote, "Shakur and Roth, who seem born for these roles, are allowed to take charge – and have fun doing it". USA Today gave the film three out of four stars and felt that Hall had not "latched onto a particularly original notion of city blight. But he knows how to mine the humor in such desperation". Similarly, Roger Ebert wrote in the Chicago Sun-Times that Roth and Shakur "illuminate" a "movie of despair and desperation" with "gritty, goofy comic spirit". He gave the film three out of four stars and said, "This is grim material, but surprisingly entertaining, and it is more cause to mourn the recent death of Shakur, who gives his best performance".

Entertainment Weekly gave the film a "B" rating and Owen Gleiberman wrote, "Gridlock'd doesn't have the imaginative vision of a movie like Trainspotting, yet it's more literally true to the haphazard torpor of the junkie life than anything we've seen on screen since Drugstore Cowboy ... Curtis-Hall has caught the bottom-feeder enervation of heroin addiction."
