= Drop Squad =

- Directed by: David C. Johnson
- Screenplay by: David C. Johnson; Butch Robinson
- Story by: David Taylor; David C. Johnson; Butch Robinson
- Produced by: Butch Robinson; Shelby Stone
- Starring: Eriq La Salle; Vondie Curtis-Hall; Ving Rhames; Kasi Lemmons; Leonard Thomas; Eric A. Payne
- Cinematography: Ken Kelsch
- Edited by: Kevin Lee
- Music by: Mike Bearden
- Production company: 40 Acres and a Mule Filmworks
- Distributed by: Gramercy Pictures
- Release date: October 28, 1994
- Running time: 86 minutes
- Country: United States
- Language: English
- Budget: $2 million
- Box office: $700 thousand (United States/Canada)

Drop Squad (sometimes spelled as DROP Squad or D.R.O.P. Squad) is a 1994 American drama film directed by David C. Johnson and executive produced by Spike Lee via his production company 40 Acres and a Mule Filmworks. The plot depicts a team of African Americans who kidnap fellow black people who they feel have betrayed their community and seek to "deprogram" them so that they will change their ways. The acronym DROP stands for "Deprogramming and Restoration of Pride". The film has been described as "[p]art thriller, part social satire".

The film was based in part on The Session, a 45-minute film Johnson produced in 1988 on a $20,000 budget, and ultimately derived from a short story by David C. Taylor titled "The Deprogrammer". Johnson described the differences between the two films as follows: "The short film was basically satire, an absurdist piece .... D.R.O.P. Squad, on the other hand, is realism. The characters have more at stake."

== Plot ==
The film portrays an advertising executive, Bruford Jamison Jr. who is in charge of the "minority development division" for an advertising agency. Among the ad campaigns he is involved with is one for a malt liquor called "Mumblin' Jack", whose billboard depicts a woman in a skimpy bikini straddling a bottle, with the slogan "It Gits Ya Crazy!" Another ad campaign depicted in the film is a commercial filled with racial stereotypes (in which Spike Lee has a cameo) for a fried chicken restaurant's Gospel-Pak, which offers a Bible verse printed on every napkin. Bruford's sister Lenora (Nicole Powell) calls in the Drop Squad to deprogram him. Bruford winds up being subjected to three weeks of psychological and physical brutality. Among the other persons who are shown being subjected to the deprogramming are a corrupt politician and a drug dealer.

The film also depicts a conflict among the members of the Drop Squad as to the tactics they should use. Rocky, the squad's leader, believes in using only nonviolent tactics, such as "subjecting them to a barrage of slides, posters, slogans and family photographs in hopes of restoring their sense of community", while Garvey believes that harsher methods have become necessary.

== Cast ==
- Eriq La Salle as Bruford Jamison, Jr.
- Vondie Curtis-Hall as Rocky Seavers
- Ving Rhames as Garvey
- Kasi Lemmons as June Vanderpool
- Leonard Thomas as XB
- Nicole Powell as Lenora Jamison
- Eric A. Payne as Stokely
- Crystal Fox as Zora
- Vanessa Estelle Williams as Mali

== Response ==
The film opened on 163 screens in the United States and Canada and grossed $348,192 in its opening weekend and a total of $734,693. The movie was dropped from the theaters it played when the movie Drop Zone was released weeks later.

Drop Squad has been suggested as a possible influence on Spike Lee's 2000 film Bamboozled.
