= Harriet (film) =

2019 American biographical film directed by Kasi Lemmons

- Theatrical release poster
- Directed by: Kasi Lemmons
- Screenplay by: Gregory Allen Howard; Kasi Lemmons
- Story by: Gregory Allen Howard
- Produced by: Debra Martin Chase; Daniela Taplin Lundberg; Gregory Allen Howard
- Starring: Cynthia Erivo; Leslie Odom Jr.; Joe Alwyn; Janelle Monáe
- Cinematography: John Toll
- Edited by: Wyatt Smith
- Music by: Terence Blanchard
- Production companies: New Balloon; Stay Gold Features
- Distributed by: Focus Features (United States); Universal Pictures (International)
- Release dates: September 10, 2019 (TIFF); November 1, 2019 (United States)
- Running time: 125 minutes
- Country: United States
- Language: English
- Budget: $17 million
- Box office: $44 million

Harriet is a 2019 American biographical film directed by Kasi Lemmons, who also wrote the screenplay with Gregory Allen Howard. It stars Cynthia Erivo as abolitionist Harriet Tubman, with Leslie Odom Jr., Joe Alwyn, and Janelle Monáe in supporting roles.

The film received several accolades and nominations, particularly for Erivo's performance, which garnered her nominations at the Academy Awards, Golden Globes, and the Screen Actors Guild. For the song "Stand Up", Erivo and Joshuah Brian Campbell received Oscar, Grammy and Golden Globe nominations.

== Plot ==
In 1849 Maryland, a slave state, Araminta "Minty" Ross is newly married to freedman John Tubman. Minty is a slave on the Brodess plantation, along with her mother and sister. Reverend Green finishes his sermon advising obedience and to follow the Lord's will. Minty's father, Ben, also a freedman, approaches her owner, Edward Brodess, with a lawyer's letter saying that Minty's mother, Harriet "Rit", was to have been freed when she was 45 and her children born free. John and Minty want to start a family and want their children to be born free. Brodess angrily tears up the letter.

In despair, Minty prays for God to kill Brodess and is caught by Brodess' adult son Gideon, who castigates her. When Brodess dies shortly afterward, Gideon offers Minty for sale. Minty, who suffers "spells" since being struck in the head as a girl, has a vision of herself escaping to freedom. She interprets these scenes as visions from God and decides to escape. John offers to accompany Minty, but she leaves him behind, fearing he would lose his freedom if caught with her. Minty meets with her father who tells her to go to Reverend Green for help with her journey.

Minty travels all night and is pursued by Gideon and other men on horseback. Eventually, Gideon corners her at a bridge over a river, where he appeals to her faith and promises not to sell her. Minty jumps anyway, proclaiming her will to "be free or die".

Minty is presumed drowned but successfully makes it to Wilmington, Delaware and locates the abolitionist Thomas Garrett. He takes her to the Pennsylvania border and Minty walks the remaining 25 miles to Philadelphia, where she meets William Still, chairman of the Pennsylvania Anti-Slavery Society. William encourages her to take a new free name and she chooses Harriet after her mother and Tubman after her husband. Harriet temporarily lodges at Marie Buchanon's, the daughter of a freed slave who was born free and is now a boarding-house proprietor.

After a year in Philadelphia, Harriet begs William to assist bringing her family over. He tells her helping slaves has become harder. Refusing to give up, Harriet successfully makes it to John's homestead with forged papers only to find he has remarried and is expecting a child. Devastated, Harriet receives further visions and is found by her father. With the exception of her parents and sister, Rachel, Harriet leads nine other slaves to safety, five of them being from Gideon's farm. The next day, Gideon realizes and threatens Rachel—who has just given birth—and her children. She reveals to Gideon that Harriet is alive and has recently returned. Gideon thinks this unlikely. Meanwhile, Harriet is admitted to the committee of the Underground Railroad for her actions.

Harriet continues to guide slaves to freedom as a conductor on the Underground Railroad, and is dubbed "Moses". However, Rachel is a house slave and will not run because Gideon has sold her children and she hopes one day to be told where they are. She meets Walter who had worked for Bigger Long as a slave catcher and decides to go with her. The Fugitive Slave Act passes, meaning escaped slaves are in jeopardy of being brought back from free states. At a meeting at the home of leading abolitionist senator William H. Seward, Harriet insists that she must evade the Act by leading them further to safety in Canada. Gideon is livid when he discovers that Harriet is "Moses". He pursues her to Philadelphia along with Bigger Long, who beats Marie to death.

Harriet then flees to Canada with help from her friends. Harriet hears that Rachel has died. After receiving a vision that her father is in imminent danger, Harriet returns and takes both her parents north. Over time, the Brodess plantation falls into financial ruin. Brodess' widow vows to catch Harriet, using her sister's children as bait, but Harriet's team overwhelms Gideon's siblings and retrieves the remaining slaves.

In a final confrontation, Gideon shoots Bigger Long dead as he is about to kill Harriet. Harriet then subdues Gideon, but allows him to live, prophesying that he would die on a battlefield fighting for a lost cause and the sin of slavery. Telling him that her people would be free, she takes his horse and rides away. Harriet later leads an armed expedition of 150 black soldiers in the Combahee River Raid. The epilogue describes some of her accomplishments: She personally freed more than 70 slaves, was a Union spy during the Civil War, led 150 black soldiers in the Combahee River Raid, freeing more than 750 slaves, and advocated for women's suffrage. She died at the approximate age of 91, with her last words being: "I go to prepare a place for you."

== Cast ==
- Cynthia Erivo as Araminta "Minty" Ross / Harriet Tubman
- Leslie Odom Jr. as William Still, a Philadelphia abolitionist who connects Harriet with the Underground Railroad
- Joe Alwyn as Gideon Brodess, Harriet's last owner
- Clarke Peters as Ben Ross, Harriet's father
- Vanessa Bell Calloway as Rit Ross, Harriet's mother
- Vondie Curtis-Hall as Reverend Samuel Green, a secretly abolitionist freedman
- Jennifer Nettles as Eliza Brodess, Gideon's mother
- Janelle Monáe as Marie Buchanon, the owner of a boarding house in Philadelphia who befriends Harriet
- Omar Dorsey as Bigger Long, a notorious black slave-catcher
- Tim Guinee as abolitionist Thomas Garrett
- Zackary Momoh as John Tubman, a freedman and husband of Harriet Tubman before her first escape attempt
- Deborah Ayorinde as Rachel Ross, Harriet's sister
- Henry Hunter Hall as Walter, a black slave-tracker who eventually switches to Harriet's side
- Tory Kittles as abolitionist Frederick Douglass
- Nigel Reed as abolitionist John Brown
- Mike Marunde (credited as Michael Marunde) as Edward Brodess, Harriet's first owner and Gideon's father

== Production ==
A biopic about Harriet Tubman had been in the works for years, with several actresses rumored to star. In 2015, Viola Davis was set to star in and produce a Harriet Tubman biopic; however, it never came to fruition. Development on a new film began in May 2016. In February 2017, Cynthia Erivo was cast as Tubman, with Seith Mann then set to direct, from a screenplay by Gregory Allen Howard.

Further development on the film was announced in September 2018, with Focus Features set as the new distributor, Kasi Lemmons attached as director (the first feature film she directed after the box office failure of Black Nativity.), and Leslie Odom Jr., Joe Alwyn, Jennifer Nettles, and Clarke Peters, and others, added to the cast. Lemmons received co-writer credit with Allen on the final script, and Allen also had the film's "story by" credit. In October, Janelle Monáe was announced as one of several actors newly added to the film, with filming beginning on October 8, 2018, and lasting through December.

Harriet was filmed entirely in Virginia, in Richmond, Powhatan, Tamworth, Petersburg, and Mathews. Berkeley Plantation in Charles City County was used for Auburn, New York.

== Release ==
Harriet had its world premiere at the Toronto International Film Festival on September 10, 2019.

It was theatrically released in the United States on November 1, 2019, by Focus Features. The film's release for Blu-ray and DVD sales took place on January 14, 2020.

== Reception ==
=== Box office ===
Harriet grossed $43.1 million in the United States and Canada and $953,432 in other territories for a worldwide total of $44 million, plus $4.8 million with home video sales, against a production budget of $17 million. In North America, the film was released alongside Terminator: Dark Fate, Arctic Dogs and Motherless Brooklyn, and was projected to gross $7–9 million from 2,059 theaters in its opening weekend. The film grossed $3.9 million on its first day, including $600,000 from Thursday night previews. It went on to slightly over-perform, debuting to $11.7 million and finishing fourth. The film made $7.4 million in its second weekend, finishing sixth, and $4.6 million on its third, finishing tenth.

=== Critical response ===
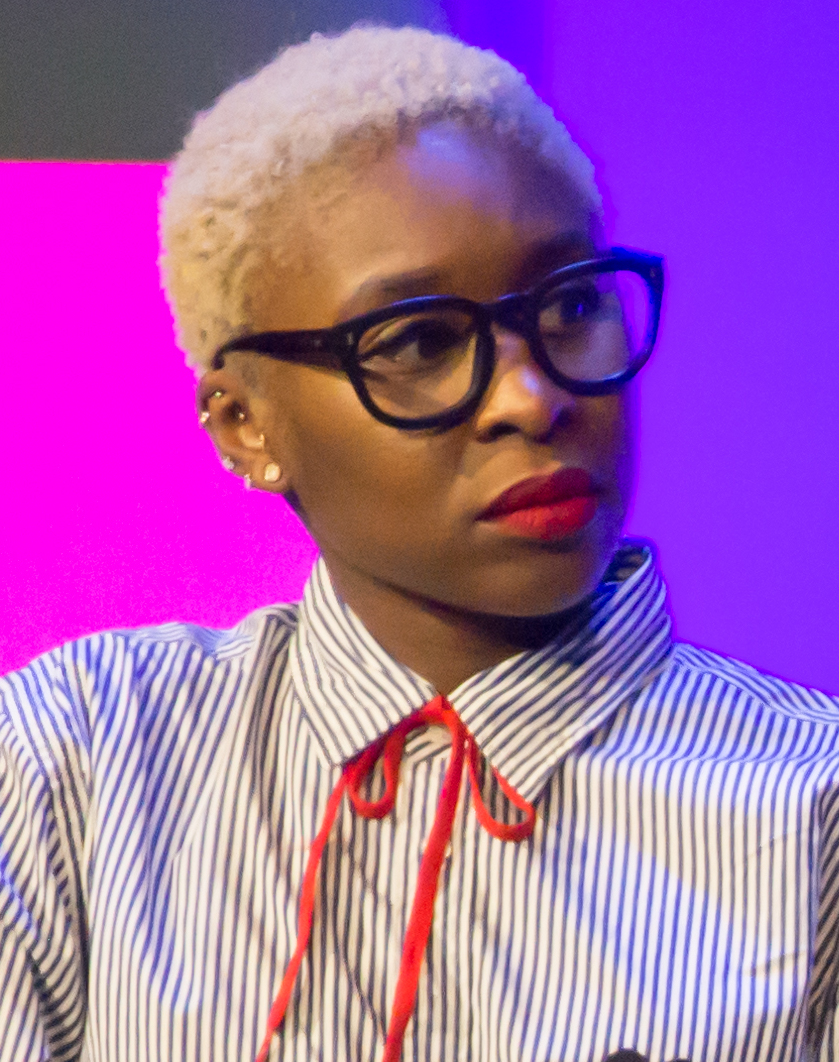
Cynthia Erivo's portrayal of Harriet Tubman garnered critical acclaim and earned her a nomination for the Academy Award for Best Actress.

On Rotten Tomatoes, the film holds an approval rating of 74% based on 233 reviews, with an average rating of 6.6/10. The website's critics' consensus reads: "Harriet serves as a sincere tribute to a pivotal figure in American history—albeit one undermined by its frustratingly formulaic approach." Metacritic assigned the film a weighted average score of 66 out of 100, based on 41 critics, indicating "generally favorable" reviews. Audiences polled by CinemaScore gave the film a rare grade of "A+", while those at PostTrak gave it an average 4.5 out of 5 stars and a 69% "definite recommend".

Reviewing for The New York Observer, Rex Reed wrote: "With enough terror to satisfy modern audiences and enough underplayed plot movement to save it from conventional biopic trajectory, Harriet holds interest and invites respect. It is still not the great Civil War epic it could have been, but it's solid enough to work, and Cynthia Erivo's valiant and committed performance is a wonderful achievement." Richard Roeper gave the film three out of four stars in his review for the Chicago Sun-Times, applauding Erivo's "convincing" and "powerful" acting as well as Lemmons' approach to the story. He wrote: "The crackling historical fiction frames [Tubman's] harrowing rescue missions in fast-paced, quick-cut style."

Some reviewers were less positive. Eric Kohn of IndieWire gave the film a "B−", writing that "Harriet doesn't attempt to reinvent the biopic, relying instead on a poignant turn by rising screen talent Cynthia Erivo as its soulful centerpiece, against the gorgeous backdrop of John Toll's cinematography and Terence Blanchard's euphoric score. As a sentimental tribute, it hardly transcends expectations—but Erivo's performance injects a palpable urgency to the material that makes up for missed time." In Variety, film critic Owen Gleiberman wrote: "Cynthia Erivo plays the escaped slave Harriet Tubman with a mournful fury, but the rest of Kasi Lemmons' biopic is more dutiful than inspired."

=== Accolades ===
List of Accolades
Award / Film Festival	Year	Recipient	Nomination	Result
AARP's Movies for Grownups Awards	2020	Kasi Lemmons, Gregory Allen Howard	Best Screenwriter	Nominated
AARP's Movies for Grownups Awards	2020	Harriet	Best Time Capsule	Won
Academy Awards	2020	Cynthia Erivo	Best Actress	Nominated
Academy Awards	2020	"Stand Up" (by Joshuah Brian Campbell and Cynthia Erivo)	Best Original Song	Nominated
African-American Film Critics Association	2019	Harriet	Top 10 Films	Won
Black Reel Awards	2020	Cynthia Erivo	Outstanding Actress	Nominated
Black Reel Awards	2020	Janelle Monáe	Outstanding Supporting Actress	Nominated
Black Reel Awards	2020	Kasi Lemmons	Outstanding Director	Nominated
Black Reel Awards	2020	John Toll	Outstanding Cinematography	Nominated
Black Reel Awards	2020	Paul Tazewell	Outstanding Costume Design	Nominated
Black Reel Awards	2020	Warren Alan Young	Outstanding Production Design	Nominated
Casting Society of America	2020	Kim Coleman, Erica Arvold, Anne Chapman, Meghan Apostoles	Studio or Independent – Drama	Nominated
Critics' Choice Awards	2020	Cynthia Erivo	Best Actress	Nominated
Critics' Choice Awards	2020	"Stand Up" (by Joshuah Brian Campbell and Cynthia Erivo)	Best Song	Nominated
Golden Globe Awards	2020	Cynthia Erivo	Best Performance by an Actress in a Motion Picture – Drama	Nominated
Golden Globe Awards	2020	"Stand Up" (by Joshuah Brian Campbell and Cynthia Erivo)	Best Original Song	Nominated
Grammy Awards	2021	"Stand Up" (by Joshuah Brian Campbell and Cynthia Erivo)	Best Song Written for Visual Media	Nominated
Heartland Film Festival	2019	Harriet	Truly Moving Picture Award	Won
Hollywood Film Awards	2019	Cynthia Erivo	Breakout Actress	Won
Hollywood Music in Media Awards	2019	Terence Blanchard	Best Original Score – Feature Film	Nominated
Hollywood Music in Media Awards	2019	"Stand Up" (by Joshuah Brian Campbell and Cynthia Erivo)	Best Original Song – Feature Film	Won
London Critics Circle Film Awards	2020	Cynthia Erivo	Best British/Irish Actress	Won
Mill Valley Film Festival	2019	Kasi Lemons	Mind the Gap Award	Won
Movieguide Awards	2020	Harriet	Best Movie for Mature Audiences	Nominated
Movieguide Awards	2020	Harriet	Epiphany Prize for Inspiring Movies	Nominated
Movieguide Awards	2020	Harriet	Faith & Freedom Award for Movies	Won
Movieguide Awards	2020	Cynthia Erivo	Grace Prize, Movies	Nominated
NAACP Image Awards	2020	Harriet	Outstanding Motion Picture	Nominated
NAACP Image Awards	2020	Harriet	Outstanding Ensemble Cast in a Motion Picture	Nominated
NAACP Image Awards	2020	Cynthia Erivo	Outstanding Actress in a Motion Picture	Nominated
NAACP Image Awards	2020	Cynthia Erivo	Outstanding Breakthrough Performance in Motion Picture	Nominated
NAACP Image Awards	2020	Leslie Odom Jr.	Outstanding Supporting Actor in a Motion Picture	Nominated
NAACP Image Awards	2020	Janelle Monáe	Outstanding Supporting Actress in a Motion Picture	Nominated
NAACP Image Awards	2020	Kasi Lemmons	Outstanding Directing in a Motion Picture (Film)	Nominated
NAACP Image Awards	2020	Kasi Lemmons and Gregory Allen Howard	Outstanding Writing in a Motion Picture (Film)	Nominated
NAACP Image Awards	2020	"Harriet (Original Motion Picture Soundtrack)" (by Terence Blanchard)	Outstanding Soundtrack/Compilation Album	Nominated
NAACP Image Awards	2020	"Stand Up" (by Joshuah Brian Campbell and Cynthia Erivo)	Outstanding Song – Traditional	Nominated
Palm Springs International Film Festival	2020	Cynthia Erivo	Breakthrough Performance Award	Won
Santa Barbara International Film Festival	2020	Cynthia Erivo	Virtuoso Award	Won
Satellite Awards	2020	Cynthia Erivo	Best Actress – Motion Picture Drama	Nominated
Satellite Awards	2020	Terence Blanchard	Best Original Score	Nominated
Screen Actors Guild Awards	2020	Cynthia Erivo	Outstanding Performance by a Female Actor in a Leading Role	Nominated
Women Film Critics Circle	2019	Cynthia Erivo	Best Actress	Won
Women Film Critics Circle	2019	Cynthia Erivo	Best Female Action Hero	Won
Women Film Critics Circle	2019	Janelle Monáe	Invisible Woman Award	Won
Women Film Critics Circle	2019	Kasi Lemmons	Best Movie by a Woman	Won
Women Film Critics Circle	2019	Harriet	Josephine Baker Award	Won
Women Film Critics Circle	2019	Harriet	Karen Morley Award	Won

== See also ==
- A Woman Called Moses, 1978 miniseries about Harriet Tubman
- The Quest for Freedom, 1992 film about Tubman
- List of black films of the 2010s
- List of films featuring slavery
