= Black Nativity =

Play written by Langston Hughes

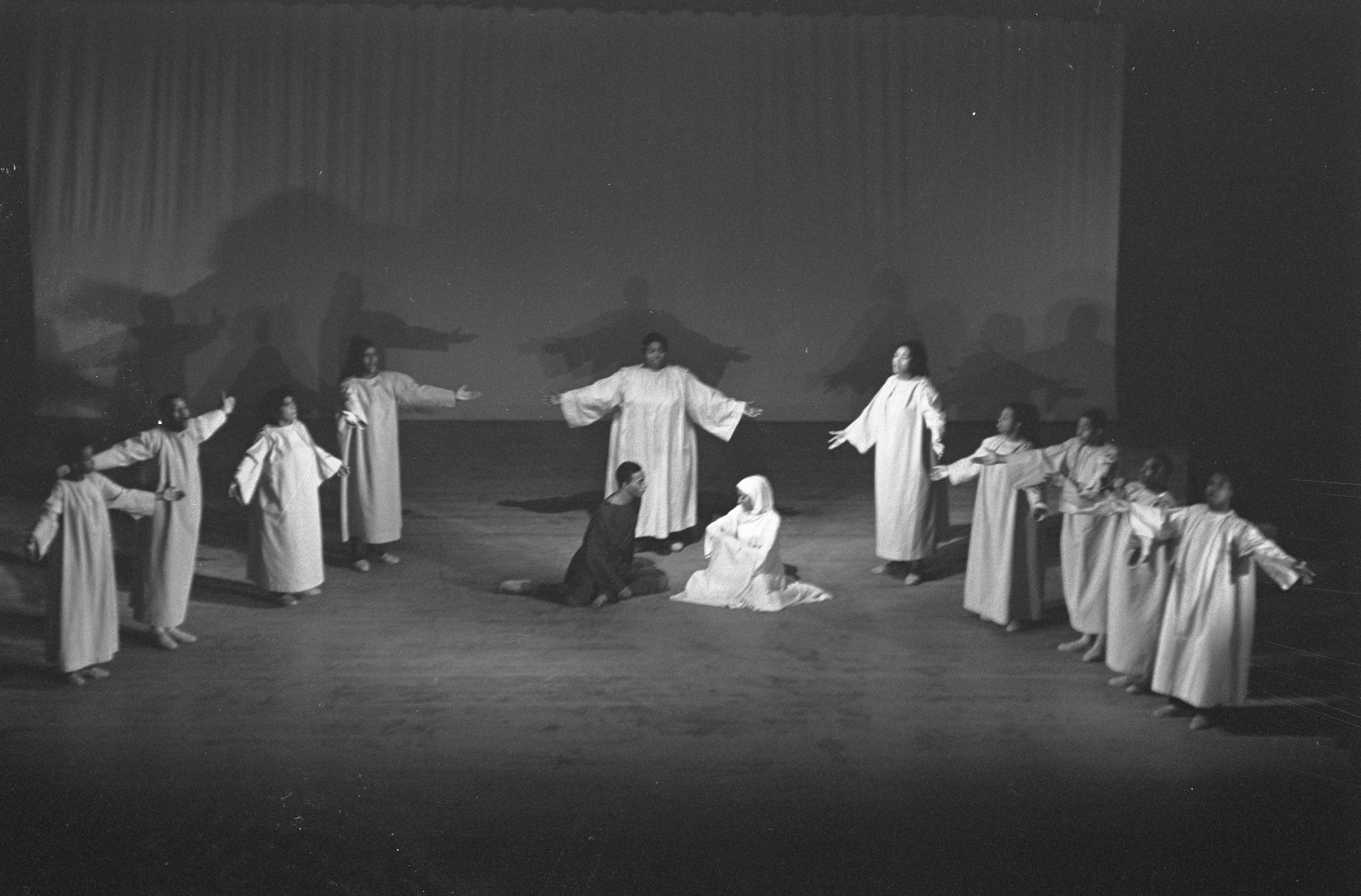
- Black Nativity in Rotterdam (1962)
- Music: Traditional gospel spirituals chosen by Langston Hughes
- Lyrics: Traditional gospel spirituals chosen by Langston Hughes
- Book: Langston Hughes
- Basis: The Nativity
- Productions: 1961 Off-Broadway

Black Nativity is an adaptation of the Nativity story by Langston Hughes, performed by an entirely black cast. Hughes was the author of the book, with the lyrics and music being derived from traditional Christmas carols, sung in gospel style, with a few songs created specifically for the show. The show was first performed Off-Broadway on December 11, 1961, and was one of the first plays written by an African American to be staged there.

Hughes developed Black Nativity in 1961 after the founders of Cleveland's famous Karamu House, Rowena and Russell Jelliffe, commissioned him for the project. As a young man, Hughes had premiered many of plays there and remained lifelong friends with the Jelliffes. Black Nativity was originally to be titled Wasn't That a Mighty Day?

A week before the musical's December 1961 opening, dancers Alvin Ailey and Carmen de Lavallade withdrew from their roles as Joseph and Mary over the title changing to Black Nativity, objecting to the racialization of a religious term. Their roles were filled by Clive Thompson and Cleo Quitman, respectively. Louis Johnson, who had replaced Ailey and de Lavallade as choreographer, received criticism from the New York Amsterdam News for dancing that was too constrained by the small stage to match the gospel singing.

The show begins with the theater completely darkened. Barefoot singers clad only in white robes and carrying (electric) candles walk in, singing the classic hymn "Go Tell It on the Mountain". The birth of Jesus is one of the most dramatic aspects of the show, as the stage--previously lit with orange and blue lights--is bathed in a deep red hue. Mary's contractions are echoed through the use of African drums and percussion. The Three Wise Men are often played by prominent members of the black community in the neighboring area, and have no singing parts. The show closes with the chorus singing a reprise of "Go Tell It on the Mountain" as they walk out in darkness. A final soliloquy by a young child ends the performance.

The show had a successful tour of Europe in 1962, one of its appearances being at the Spoleto Festival of Two Worlds in Italy.

Black Nativity has been performed annually in Boston, Massachusetts, at various locations, such as: the Elma Lewis School of Fine Arts, Boston Opera House, Tremont Temple, Roxbury Community College, Northeastern's Blackman Auditorium, and presently at Emerson College's Paramount Theater. It has been performed in Boston since 1970 and is considered the longest-running production of Langston Hughes' Black Nativity. The original 160 singers were arranged by age group and vocal range, with an assortment of soloists, along with the narrator, and Mary and Joseph, who are both mute, as well as musicians and ASL interpreters.

A performance of this musical also has taken place every Christmas season since 1998 in Seattle, first at the Intiman Theatre and then at the Moore Theatre. The theatrical director is Jackie Moscou, the music director is Patrinell Wright, and the choreography was designed by Donald Byrd. It is a smaller production with 30 or so choir members – most of whom are also members of The Total Experience Gospel Choir, led by Pastor Patrinell Wright, and the performance also includes 10 dancers and five musicians. The production was revived in 2023 after a decade away as part of Intiman's 50th Anniversary Season with an all-new creative team and vision.

== Original cast recording ==
An original cast recording, titled Black Nativity, Gospel On Broadway! featuring Marion Williams & the Stars of Faith, Princess Stewart and Prof. Alex Bradford & the Bradford Singers, was released by Vee-Jay Records in 1963, with reported sales of close to 75,000 by June 8, 1963.

== Adaptations ==
In 2004, a documentary film was made about the world premiere performance, production, and creation of the best-selling gospel Christmas album Black Nativity – In Concert: A Gospel Celebration, and the original cast, under the direction of Aaron Robinson that brought it to life at the Immanuel Baptist Church in Portland, Maine.

A film version directed by Kasi Lemmons and starring Forest Whitaker and Angela Bassett was released on November 27, 2013.
