= Waist Deep =

2006 American action drama film directed by Vondie Curtis-Hall

- Theatrical release poster
- Directed by: Vondie Curtis-Hall
- Screenplay by: Vondie Curtis-Hall; Darin Scott
- Story by: Michael Mahern
- Produced by: Preston Holmes
- Starring: Tyrese Gibson; Meagan Good; Larenz Tate; The Game
- Cinematography: Shane Hurlbut
- Edited by: Terilyn A. Shropshire
- Music by: Denaun Porter; Terence Blanchard; Howard Drossin
- Production company: Intrepid Pictures
- Distributed by: Rogue Pictures (United States and Canada); Universal Pictures (International)
- Release date: June 23, 2006
- Running time: 97 minutes
- Country: United States
- Language: English
- Box office: $21.3 million

Waist Deep is a 2006 American action drama film directed by Vondie Curtis-Hall and starring Tyrese Gibson and Meagan Good.

== Plot ==
Ex-con Otis Samuel Sr. or "O2" on account of his ability to vanish from a crime scene like oxygen, has done his time and is determined to stay out of trouble and never leave his young son, Otis, Jr.

When Otis arrives late to pick up Junior from school, he pledges that he will always return for Junior. That promise is put to the test just moments later when Otis' vintage 1966 Chevrolet Impala SS Lowrider convertible is stolen from him at gunpoint in the middle of a crowded Southland intersection with Junior in the back seat, kidnapping him in the process. Otis chases the car and gets into a nasty gun battle with the carjackers, but to no avail.

Otis catches up with Coco, a woman who sells stolen suits for P Money. Otis knows she is the one who marked him for the carjacking, and he forces her to help him retrieve Junior. The two steal a car (a 1996 Impala SS sedan) and Coco's boyfriend savagely beats her. Seeing this, Otis pistol whips him with his gun before the two retreat to Lucky's home. Lucky, Otis' unreliable cousin who works for Big Meat, the leader of the Outlaw Syndicate, offers to help.

After a few hours, Lucky comes back with some bad news: Meat has Junior and demands that Otis deliver $100,000 by midnight the next night, or Junior will die. Meat was once Otis' partner and thinks Otis still has the $100,000 they made off their last job together.

Otis comes up with a plan: he and Coco will rob P Money's and Meat's own operations, staging it to look like one is stealing from the other, and triggering a gang war that will hopefully eliminate both and help Otis and Coco rescue Junior. After a successful robbery of one of the Big Meat's locations, Otis and Coco come across a set of safe deposit box keys belonging to numerous banks.

The next day, they stage a number of bank robberies and are able to retrieve expensive jewelry, which Lucky offers to get rid to prove his worth. When Lucky takes the jewelry to Big Meat unknowing that it belongs to Big Meat, Lucky is forced to set up a meeting between himself, Otis, and Coco, with Big Meat along to end Otis.

They take the car to an alley and give him the money. It is revealed that Big Meat never intended to let Junior live and signals one of his men to kill Junior. Lucky sees this and tackles him as the man shoots, one shot hit Lucky in the side of the chest. Otis kills Meat and his men and retrieves Junior.

They stop at a gas station to attend to Lucky's wound. Otis tells Lucky they will get him to a hospital, but Lucky dies from his wounds. Distress from Otis' discovery causes him to briefly lose control of the car, and alert the police. Otis hides in a parking lot and tells Coco to take Junior to the Mexican border while he outruns the cops. As Junior and Coco escape, Otis is tailed by the cops. They run him to a dead end where the lake is. Otis, realizing he has no choice, drives into the water.

Later in Mexico, Coco and Junior are living in a house on a beach. They are walking on the beach when they see Otis in the distance and then reunite.

== Cast ==
- Tyrese Gibson as Otis "O2" Samuels Sr.
- Meagan Good as Constance "Coco" Taylor
- Larenz Tate as "Lucky"
- The Game as "Big Meat"
- Henry Hunter Hall as Otis "Junior" Samuels Jr.
- Kimora Lee Simmons as Fencing House Lady
- Darris Love as "Rock"
- Julius Denem as "P Money"
- Thomas Abate as Gas Manager

== Reception ==
=== Box office ===
The film debuted at number four behind Click, Disney/Pixar's Cars, and Nacho Libre, grossing $9,404,180 from 1,004 theaters with a $9,366 average in its opening weekend. Altogether, the film grossed $21,353,303.

=== Critical response ===
Review aggregate Rotten Tomatoes has the film at a 28% approval rating based on 76 reviews, with an average score of 4.5/10. The site's critical consensus reads: "A well-meaning B-movie that suffers from a cliche-ridden script and poorly drawn characters that fail to inspire much sympathy."

Steve Davis of The Austin Chronicle criticized Curtis-Hall's "cinema vérité" approach to the film, writing that it focuses less on the aspects of "parental instincts" found in Kramer vs. Kramer and Lorenzo's Oil for the violence-driven scenes of Bonnie and Clyde, saying that "In light of such sensationalism, the efforts [of Waist Deep] to make some meaningful social commentary about street gangs and the vicious circle in which African-American men often find themselves seem like an afterthought, rather than anything remotely sincere."

Wesley Morris, writing for The Boston Globe, said that the movie captures the 2003 Jay-Z and Beyoncé duet more than the 1967 Arthur Penn classic with its monotonous chases and middling supporting cast that make up Curtis-Hall's take on the hood film genre, saying "It's [also] as if the only way he could justify making another movie smitten with thug life is by having the characters commit their crimes amid a climate of civic activism."

The A.V. Club's Nathan Rabin gave the film a "D" grade, saying "Waist Deep might have succeeded had Curtis-Hall pushed the outrageousness of his potboiler premise to the level of comic-book Grand Guignol, but the film lacks the energy and pizzazz to work as lurid pulp. Like the forgotten blaxploitation schlock it often resembles, the film aspires to nothing but cheap thrills, but while it's plenty cheap, it's far from thrilling."

Entertainment Weekly writer Gregory Kirschling gave the film a "B" grade, saying that Curtis-Hall infuses the B-level urban fantasy plot with some "surprising social and emotional flavorings rarely found in the genre." Mick LaSalle of the San Francisco Chronicle said that the movie manages to capture the "freewheeling spirit" of the tried and true formula it uses to go along with the stylish scenes and felt both Gibson and Good had solid chemistry and carried their roles with expertise, concluding that "Sure, there's probably no good reason to watch Waist Deep. But if you start watching it, Waist Deep gives you no good reason to stop. It doesn't even give you a moment to think about it."

IGN contributor Stax also praised the performances of Gibson and Good, calling the former "sensitive yet charismatic" and the latter "vivacious and scene-stealing", for elevating the material that Curtis-Hall peppers with tense action scenes, concluding that "[W]hile Waist Deep offers precious little that hasn't been seen in dozens of other "lovers on the lam" movies and urban crime pics, its energy, wit, effective lead performances and taut direction save this old-fashioned B-movie from being a Waist of time."

In 2011, Complex placed the film at number 25 on its list of the worst movies starring rappers. Complex staff writer Matt Barone said that it could have been an underwhelming yet tolerable hood version of Bonnie & Clyde, had it not been for the casting of Game as the main antagonist that devolves it into "ludicrousness and lack of dramatic resonance" territory, concluding that "Hate it or really hate it, his overacting kills Waist Deep, and not in the slang term sense."

=== Nominations ===
- Film: Outstanding Hip-Hop Movie, (Nominated) BET Hip-Hop Movie Awards
- Tyrese Gibson: Outstanding Performance by a Lead Actor, (Nominated) Black Movie Awards
- Meagan Good: Outstanding Performance by a Lead Actress, (Nominated) Black Movie Awards, Choice Female Breakout Performance, (Nominated) Teen Choice Award

== See also ==
- List of hood films
- Bonnie and Clyde: A 1967 film that shares similar subplots including the two main characters on the road, trying to avoid police, and committing bank robberies.
