= Marine Parade (play) =

Play written by Simon Stephens

Marine Parade is a musical play by the playwright Simon Stephens with music by Mark Eitzel. It was premiered in the 2010 Brighton Festival.

It is set in a hotel on Marine Parade on Brighton's seafront and follows the lives of five couples that stay there for a weekend. The original songs were written by Mark Eitzel.
