= Stand Up (Cynthia Erivo song) =

2019 single by Cynthia Erivo

Single by Cynthia Erivo

from the album Harriet (Original Motion Picture Soundtrack)
- Released: 25 October 2019
- Length: 5:03
- Label: Back Lot Music
- Songwriters: Cynthia Erivo; Joshuah Brian Campbell
- Producers: Will Wells; Gabe Fox-Peck

Cynthia Erivo singles chronology
| "God Only Knows" (2018) | "Stand Up" (2019) | "When You Believe" (2020) |

Music video
- "Stand Up" on YouTube

"Stand Up" is a song performed by English singer Cynthia Erivo and co-written by Erivo with Joshuah Brian Campbell. It was released on 25 October 2019, as the lead single from the soundtrack to the biographical film Harriet, which also stars Erivo.

== Background and composition ==
In 2017, English singer and actress Cynthia Erivo was cast to portray abolitionist and activist Harriet Tubman in the biographical film eponymously titled Harriet. Following the completion of filming, Erivo collaborated with composer Joshuah Brian Campbell to write the song for the end credits of the film.

Written by Erivo and Campbell, "Stand Up" was produced by Will Wells and Gabe Fox-Peck. The song was described by Rolling Stone's Jon Blistein as a "slow-burning, gospel-tinged ballad." Rania Aniftos of Billboard noted that it chronicles themes of "hope, overcoming obstacles and kindness for others." The song's lyrics also make use of Tubman's last words before her death in 1913: "I go to prepare a place for you."

== Music video ==
The music video for "Stand Up" was released on 8 November 2019. It shows Erivo performing the song on an "empty but beautifully lit soundstage."

== Accolades ==
Following its release, the song earned Golden Globe Award and Critics' Choice Movie Award nominations for Best Original Song and Best Song, respectively. It also garnered an Academy Award nomination for Best Original Song. The song was also nominated for the Best Song Written for Visual Media at the 63rd Annual Grammy Awards, the Best Original Song at the 51st NAACP Image Awards, and the Best Original Song at the 13th Houston Film Critics Society Awards. It won the Society of Composers & Lyricists Award for Outstanding Original Song for Visual Media. Erivo is only the third person to be nominated for an Academy Award for both acting and songwriting in the same year, the first being Mary J. Blige in 2018 for Mudbound and the second being Lady Gaga for A Star is Born in 2019.

== Charts ==
Chart performance for "Stand Up"
| Chart (2020–2021) | Peak position |
|---|---|
| Hungary (Single Top 40) | 36 |
| Sweden Heatseeker (Sverigetopplistan) | 2 |
| US Digital Song Sales (Billboard) | 31 |

== Certifications ==
Certifications for "Stand Up"
| Region | Certification | Certified units/sales |
|---|---|---|
| United States (RIAA) | Gold | 500,000^{‡} |
^{‡} Sales+streaming figures based on certification alone.

== Release history ==
| Region | Date | Format | Label | Ref. |
|---|---|---|---|---|
| Various | 25 October 2019 | Digital download; streaming | Back Lot Music | |
