= Black Nativity (film) =

- Theatrical release poster
- Directed by: Kasi Lemmons
- Screenplay by: Kasi Lemmons
- Based on: Black Nativity by Langston Hughes
- Produced by: William Horberg; T. D. Jakes; Galt Niederhoffer; Celine Rattray; Trudie Styler
- Starring: Forest Whitaker; Angela Bassett; Tyrese Gibson; Jacob Latimore; Mary J. Blige; Nasir Jones; Jennifer Hudson
- Cinematography: Anastas N. Michos
- Edited by: Terilyn A. Shropshire
- Music by: Laura Karpman; Raphael Saadiq
- Production companies: Maven Pictures; Wonderful Films
- Distributed by: Fox Searchlight Pictures
- Release date: November 27, 2013
- Running time: 93 minutes
- Country: United States
- Language: English
- Budget: $17.5 million
- Box office: $7.5 million

Black Nativity is a 2013 American musical drama film written and directed by Kasi Lemmons, based on the 1961 play by Langston Hughes. The film stars an ensemble cast, featuring Forest Whitaker, Angela Bassett, Tyrese Gibson, Jennifer Hudson, Mary J. Blige, Jacob Latimore, Vondie Curtis-Hall, and rapper Nas. It was released in the United States on November 27, 2013, by Fox Searchlight Pictures.

== Plot ==
After his mother, Naima, is evicted from their Baltimore apartment, teenage Langston is sent to spend the holidays with his estranged grandparents in New York City. He talks to a man called Isaiah on the bus ("Sometimes I Feel Like a Motherless Child"). When Langston arrives in the city, he just misses his grandparents and, shortly after, is robbed of his possessions. Entering a hotel to get directions to his grandparents' place, Langston is accused of trying to take a wallet and is quickly taken in by the police. While in the holding cell, he meets a man who makes fun of him for stealing wallets. Shortly after, Langston is reunited with his grandfather, the Reverend Cobbs, who takes him to his home. On the way, they meet a pregnant lady called Maria.

Langston is taken aback by the comfortable home his grandparents live in and by the fact that they know nothing about him and his mother Naima. In an attempt to bond with Langston, the Reverend shows him a pocket watch with a personalized inscription from Martin Luther King Jr. Langston pockets the watch. Maria & Jo-Jo come carol singing ("Silent Night") and Langston is told they are homeless.

In the morning, Langston tries to pawn the watch. However, the pawnshop owner is a friend of his grandfather and refuses to buy it, telling Langston to treasure the pocket watch and return it to his grandfather. Outside the pawnbroker's shop, Langston meets the man he met in the holding cell. The man is passing out flyers for the pawnbroker and offers to procure for him whatever he wants. Langston tries to talk to his grandmother, Aretha, about why his mother left. She denies that he was the cause of the rift but says that his father was the reason behind their estrangement. Before leaving for church, Langston finds the man from the jail cell, the same man from the corner of the pawnshop, and asks him for a gun. The man then tells Langston to meet him at the same spot later at night.

Despite his reluctance to attend church, Aretha and the Reverend pressure him to attend church as they are performing Langston Hughes' play Black Nativity. Langston sees the man from the pawnshop & Maria and the young man from an earlier scene. While there, Langston falls asleep and dreams that he is a part of the nativity ("Sweet Little Jesus Boy"), with Maria, a young pregnant woman he met earlier, playing the part of the virgin Mary. Waking up, Langston leaves the church to meet with the man he met in the jail cell. The man shows him the gun he wanted and Langston takes it from him and then tries to hold him up, asking him to give him a ring he spotted earlier in the display case and all the cash in the pawnbroker's cash register. Instead, the man quotes A Dream Deferred to him and reveals that he is Langston's father, Tyson. A passing police officer spots the two and enters, but Langston's father convinces him that they were only having an argument and Langston was only trying to convince him to go to church with him. The police officer then drives them to the church where they meet Naima.

Inside the church with his father and mother, Langston asks his grandfather what happened between his parents. The Reverend confesses that he gave Tyson five thousand dollars to leave Naima and Langston, hoping that Naima would return to her parents. Instead, Naima found out what her father had done and left with Langston, cutting off both Tyson and her parents. Naima tries to leave with Langston, but he urges her to forgive her parents. She does, and the entire family is reunited at last. ("As")

== Cast ==
- Forest Whitaker as Reverend Cornell Cobbs
- Angela Bassett as Aretha Cobbs
- Tyrese Gibson as Tyson/Loot
- Jennifer Hudson as Naima Cobbs
- Mary J. Blige as Angel
- Vondie Curtis-Hall as Pawnbroker
- Nas as Isaiah
- Jacob Latimore as Langston
- Rotimi as Officer Butch McDaniels
- Luke James as Jo-Jo/Joseph
- Grace Gibson as Maria/Mary

== Reception ==
On Rotten Tomatoes, the film holds an approval of 51% based on 87 reviews, and an average rating of 5.6/10. The website's critical consensus reads: "It's sweetly amiable and solidly performed, but Black Nativity suffers from director Kasi Lemmons' heavy-handed treatment of its celebrated source material." On Metacritic, the film has a weighted average score of 48 out of 100, based on 29 critics, indicating "mixed or average" reviews. Audiences polled by CinemaScore gave the film an average grade of "A−" on an A+ to F scale.

== Accolades ==
Year	Association	Category	Recipient(s)	Result	Ref.
2014	NAACP Image Award	Outstanding Actress in a Motion Picture	Angela Bassett	Won	

== See also ==
- List of Christmas films
- List of black films of the 2010s
