= Leonardo DiCaprio filmography =

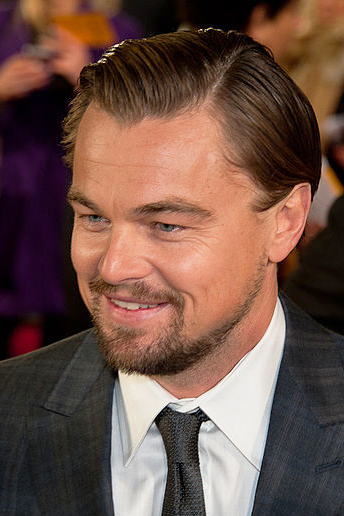
DiCaprio at the UK premiere of The Wolf of Wall Street in 2014.

Leonardo DiCaprio is an American actor who began his career performing as a child on television. He appeared on the shows The New Lassie (1989) and Santa Barbara (1990) and also had long-running roles in the comedy-drama Parenthood (1990) and the sitcom Growing Pains (1991). DiCaprio played Tobias "Toby" Wolff opposite Robert De Niro in the biographical coming-of-age drama This Boy's Life in 1993. In the same year, he had a supporting role as a developmentally disabled boy Arnie Grape in What's Eating Gilbert Grape, which earned him nominations for the Academy Award for Best Supporting Actor and the Golden Globe Award for Best Supporting Actor – Motion Picture. In 1995, DiCaprio played the leading roles of an American author Jim Carroll in The Basketball Diaries and the French poet Arthur Rimbaud in Total Eclipse. The following year he played Romeo Montague in the Baz Luhrmann-directed film Romeo + Juliet (1996). DiCaprio starred with Kate Winslet in the James Cameron-directed film Titanic (1997). The film became the highest grossing at the worldwide box-office, (Note: Titanic was later surpassed by the Cameron-directed science fiction film Avatar (2009) which held the record till 2019 when Avengers: Endgame overtook it. Avatar retook the record after a 2021 re-release in China.) and made him famous globally. For his performance as Jack Dawson, he received the MTV Movie Award for Best Male Performance and his first nomination for the Golden Globe Award for Best Actor – Motion Picture Drama.

In 2002, DiCaprio played con-artist Frank Abagnale Jr. opposite Tom Hanks in the Steven Spielberg-directed biographical crime-drama Catch Me If You Can and also starred in the Martin Scorsese-directed historical drama Gangs of New York. He founded his own production company, Appian Way, in 2004. The next two films he starred in were both directed by Scorsese: the Howard Hughes biopic The Aviator (2004) and the crime drama The Departed (2006). For his portrayal of Hughes in the former, DiCaprio won the Golden Globe Award for Best Actor – Motion Picture Drama and garnered his first nomination for the Academy Award for Best Actor.

DiCaprio produced the environmental documentary The 11th Hour and the comedy drama Gardener of Eden in 2007. The following year, he reunited with Kate Winslet in the Sam Mendes-directed drama Revolutionary Road and appeared in the Ridley Scott-directed action film Body of Lies. DiCaprio reteamed with Scorsese in 2010 in the psychological thriller Shutter Island and also starred in the Christopher Nolan-directed science fiction heist thriller Inception. In 2011, he portrayed J. Edgar Hoover, the first director of the FBI, in the Clint Eastwood-directed biopic J. Edgar. The following year, he played a supporting role in the Quentin Tarantino-directed western Django Unchained. DiCaprio starred in two film adaptations of novels in 2013; he first appeared as Jay Gatsby in the Luhrmann-directed adaptation of F. Scott Fitzgerald's novel The Great Gatsby, and later as Jordan Belfort in the Scorsese-directed film The Wolf of Wall Street, an adaptation of Belfort's memoir of the same name. The latter earned him a third Academy Award nomination for Best Actor and a Golden Globe Award for Best Actor – Motion Picture Musical or Comedy. In 2015, DiCaprio played fur trapper Hugh Glass in the Alejandro González Iñárritu-directed survival drama The Revenant, for which he won the Academy Award for Best Actor. In 2019, he starred as an actor on the decline in the Tarantino-directed comedy-drama Once Upon a Time in Hollywood with Brad Pitt and Margot Robbie. In 2023, he portrayed Ernest Burkhart, a World War I veteran, in the Scorsese-directed epic anti-Western crime drama Killers of the Flower Moon. In 2025, he starred as a washed-up former member and explosive device expert of a revolutionary group known as the French 75 in the Paul Thomas Anderson-directed black comedy action-thriller One Battle After Another.

== Film ==
=== As an actor ===
Year	Title	Role	Notes	Ref.
1991	Critters 3	Josh	Direct-to-video	
1993	This Boy's Life	Tobias Wolff		
1993	What's Eating Gilbert Grape	Arnie Grape		
1995	The Basketball Diaries	Jim Carroll		
1995	The Quick and the Dead	Fee "The Kid" Herod		
1995	Total Eclipse	Arthur Rimbaud		
1996	Romeo + Juliet	Romeo Montague		
1996	Marvin's Room	Hank Lacker		
1997	Titanic	Jack Dawson		
1998	The Man in the Iron Mask	Louis XIV / Philippe		
1998	Celebrity	Brandon Darrow		
2000	The Beach	Richard		
2001	Don's Plum	Derek	Amateurial Short Film	
2002	Gangs of New York	Amsterdam Vallon		
2002	Catch Me If You Can	Frank Abagnale Jr.		
2004	The Aviator	Howard Hughes		
2006	The Departed	Billy Costigan		
2006	Blood Diamond	Danny Archer		
2007	The 11th Hour	Himself / narrator	Documentary; also writer	
2008	Body of Lies	Roger Ferris		
2008	Revolutionary Road	Frank Wheeler		
2010	Shutter Island	Edward "Teddy" Daniels		
2010	Hubble	Narrator (voice)	Documentary	
2010	Inception	Dom Cobb		
2011	J. Edgar	J. Edgar Hoover		
2012	Django Unchained	Calvin J. Candie		
2013	The Great Gatsby	Jay Gatsby		
2013	The Wolf of Wall Street	Jordan Belfort		
2015	The Revenant	Hugh Glass		
2015	The Audition	Himself	Short film	
2016	Before the Flood	Himself	Documentary	
2019	Once Upon a Time in Hollywood	Rick Dalton		
2019	Ice on Fire	Narrator (voice)	Documentary	
2021	Don't Look Up	Dr. Randall Mindy		
2023	Killers of the Flower Moon	Ernest Burkhart		
2025	One Battle After Another	"Ghetto" Pat Calhoun / Bob Ferguson		
TBA	What Happens at Night	The Man	Post-production	

=== As producer ===
Year	Title	Credit	Ref.
2004	The Aviator	Executive producer	
2004	The Assassination of Richard Nixon	Executive producer	
2007	The 11th Hour	Producer	
2007	Gardener of Eden	Producer	
2009	Orphan	Producer	
2011	Red Riding Hood	Producer	
2011	The Ides of March	Executive producer	
2013	Runner Runner	Producer	
2013	Out of the Furnace	Producer	
2013	The Wolf of Wall Street	Producer	
2014	Virunga	Executive producer	
2015	Catching the Sun	Executive producer	
2015	Cowspiracy	Executive producer	
2016	The Ivory Game	Executive producer	
2016	Before the Flood	Producer	
2016	Live by Night	Producer	
2018	Delirium	Producer	
2018	Robin Hood	Producer	
2018	Struggle: The Life and Lost Art of Szukalski	Producer	
2019	And We Go Green	Producer	
2019	Richard Jewell	Producer	
2021	Kid 90	Executive producer	
2021	The Loneliest Whale: The Search for 52	Executive producer	
2021	Fin	Executive producer	
2023	We Are Guardians	Executive producer	
2023	Killers of the Flower Moon	Executive producer	
2023	Ozi: Voice of the Forest	Producer	
2025	Yanuni	Producer	
2026	The Lake	Executive producer	
TBA	What Happens at Night	Producer	

== Television ==
Year(s)	Title	Role	Notes	Ref.
1989	The New Lassie	Glen	2 episodes	
1990	The Mickey Mouse Club	Alex	Episode: "Street Safe, Street Smart"	
1990	The Outsiders	Kid Fighting Scout	Episode: "Pilot"	
1990	Santa Barbara	Young Mason Capwell	5 episodes	
1990–1991	Parenthood	Garry Buckman	12 episodes	
1991	Roseanne	Darlene's Classmate	Episode: "Home-Ec" (Uncredited)	
1991–1992	Growing Pains	Luke Brower	23 episodes	
2008–2010	Greensburg	—N/a	Executive producer and co-creator	
2014	Saturday Night Live	Himself (cameo)	Episode: "Jonah Hill/Bastille"	
2018	The Men Who Built America: Frontiersmen	—N/a	Executive producer	
2020	Grant	—N/a	Executive producer	
2020	The Right Stuff	—N/a	Executive producer	
2020	Whose Vote Counts, Explained	Narrator (voice)	Episode: "The Right to Vote"	
2021	The Titans That Built America	—N/a	Executive producer	
2022	Theodore Roosevelt	—N/a	Executive producer	

== Music videos ==
Year(s)	Title	Performer	Role	Notes	Ref.
2019	"Earth"	Lil Dicky	Himself		

== See also ==
- List of awards and nominations received by Leonardo DiCaprio
