= Kid 90 =

2021 American documentary film

- Official release poster
- Directed by: Soleil Moon Frye
- Produced by: Stacy Mahoney; Eliza Hindmarch
- Starring: Soleil Moon Frye
- Cinematography: Todd Hickey
- Edited by: Matt Ferro; Lori Lovoy-Goran
- Music by: Linda Perry
- Production companies: STX Entertainment; Appian Way Productions
- Distributed by: Hulu
- Release date: March 12, 2021 (United States)
- Running time: 71 minutes
- Country: United States
- Language: English

Kid 90 is a 2021 American documentary film directed and produced by Soleil Moon Frye. The film follows Frye who carried a camera around with her everywhere she went. Leonardo DiCaprio serves as an executive producer under his Appian Way Productions banner.

== Synopsis ==
In the 1990s, Soleil Moon Frye carried a video camera with her everywhere she went. David Arquette, Balthazar Getty, Brian Austin Green, Stephen Dorff, Mark-Paul Gosselaar, Danny Boy O'Connor and Heather McComb appear in the film, while Harold Hunter, Justin Pierce, Jenny Lewis, Sara Gilbert, Charlie Sheen, Leonardo DiCaprio, Kevin Connolly, Mark Wahlberg, Corey Feldman, Michael Rapaport and Jonathan Brandis appear in the film through footage shot by Frye.

One of the major narratives of the documentary was her many friends who died at a young age from suicide or drug overdose, including Jonathan Brandis, Shannon Wilsey, Rodney Harvey, Harold Hunter and Justin Pierce.

== Production ==
Soleil Moon Frye spent four years going through footage she had shot, diaries, and voicemails, from when she was a teenage girl in the 1990s. Initially planning to make the film not about herself, she began reaching out to friends from that period regardless if she had remained friends or drifted apart from them. When deciding to include herself in the film, she asked a consulting editor on the project to interview her in the film. Jonathan Brandis' parents approved of footage of him appearing in the film.

In August 2020, it was announced Leonardo DiCaprio would serve as an executive producer under his Appian Way Productions banner, with STX Entertainment also producing the film.

== Release ==
It was released on March 12, 2021.

== Reception ==
Kid 90 holds a 76% approval rating on review aggregator website Rotten Tomatoes, based on 34 reviews, with a weighted average of 7.1/10. The website's consensus reads, "It's insular and uneven, but Kid 90 also presents a raw and affecting first-person look at the experience of growing up in the spotlight." On Metacritic, the film holds a rating of 67 out of 100, based on 9 critics, indicating "generally favorable reviews".

Zach Ruskin for the San Francisco Chronicle gave the film a "Little Man Clapping", roughly translating to a 4/5 stars, opining "Other documentaries have made this point in grander, more artistic ways, but there is value in seeing this raw footage that accompanies an adolescence spent in front of the camera."
