= Film International =

- Discipline: Film studies
- Language: English
- Edited by: Matthew Sorrento

Publication details
- History: 1973–present
- Publisher: Intellect Ltd.
- Frequency: Quarterly

Standard abbreviations
- ISO 4: Film Int.

Indexing
- ISSN: 1651-6826 (print); 2040-3801 (web)
- OCLC no.: 803316091

Links
- Journal homepage

Film International is a quarterly academic journal focused on filmmaking, with a companion website, FilmInt, which covers film studies. The journal includes critical, historical, and theoretical essays on film, television, and moving image studies, as well as interviews, film reviews, and other topics.

== History ==
Film International was established in 1973 in Swedish. In 2003, it became an English-language journal.

== Description ==
Film International is an academic journal with a companion site, FilmInt, that covers film studies.

It is published by Intellect Ltd. and presents critical, historical, and theoretical essays on film, television, and moving image studies, including book reviews, interviews, and coverage of film festivals around the world. It regularly features film reviews, interviews with directors, actors, and cinematographers, as well as covering national cinemas on a country-by-country basis. The content ranges throughout topics of the moving image, from art cinema, foreign films, genre works, and music videos, like Beyonce's Lemonade.

== People ==
As of 2022 editor-in-chief is Matthew Sorrento. The image editor is Jonathan Monovich, and contributing editors have included Jessica Baxter, Jacob Mertens, Liza Palmer, Yun-hua Chen, Christopher Sharrett, Jeremy Carr, Robert K. Lightning, George Toles, and Alexandra Heller-Nicholas.

== Recognition and assessment ==
Andre Gregory has described the journal as "of enormous interest to anyone who is passionate about film," while Robert Pulcini has commented that FilmInt offers "a level of writing about film that is unfortunately all too rare these days."

Works from the journal have been adapted in longer studies by top scholars and authors, including Toles, Carl Freedman, Carol Vernallis, and Murray Pomerance.

David Hudson of The Criterion Collection regards the journal as a standout in book reviewing. Critic Robin Wood was a longtime contributor.

== Abstracting and indexing ==
The journal is abstracted and indexed in:

- MLA International Bibliography
- Current Abstracts
- FIAF (International Federation of Film Archives)
- Art & Architecture Complete
- Art Index
- Art Full Text
- British Humanities Index
- Scopus
