= Victoria Looseleaf =

American author and media critic

Victoria Looseleaf is an American author, performing and visual arts critic, and print, broadcast, dance and electronic journalist.

== Life ==
Looseleaf has degrees in psychology and criminology from UC Berkeley, and also earned a master's in the performance and literature of the harp from Mills College.

She became a regular contributor to the Los Angeles Times in 1996, and wrote for KCET Artbound, Artillery, the New York Times, Reuters, Performances magazine, La Opinion, and KUSC, where she interviewed classical music stars and Hollywood actors and directors, including Jane Fonda, Chris Pine, Alejandro González Iñárritu, and Javier Bardem. She was also a contributor to Dance Teacher Magazine, and Dance Magazine.

Looseleaf's articles for the Los Angeles Times include interviews with horror film director Roger Corman, dancer Samuel Donlavy and performance artist Ann Magnuson.

An artist and professional harpist, Looseleaf was also involved in an early experiment in performative holography in 1976 and was featured as part of a Los Angeles city-wide EZTV retrospective "Video Capital of the World: 45 Years of EZTV in LA" in May 2025.

Victoria Looseleaf created the longstanding cable access show The Looseleaf Report where her guests included Timothy Leary, George Carlin, crime fiction writer James Ellroy, science fiction writer Ray Bradbury, and, in his first TV talk show appearance, actor Leonardo DiCaprio. She then wrote DiCaprio's 1998 biography, Leonardo: Up Close and Personal. By December of 2008 she had recorded over 400 episodes of the show.

In 2006, the Los Angeles based Dance Resource Center awarded Looseleaf a Lester Horton Dance Award for "Furthering the Visibility of Dance".

== External sources ==
- Victoria Looseleaf at IMDb
- The Looseleaf Report by Victoria Looseleaf
