= Leonardo DiCaprio =

American actor (born 1974)

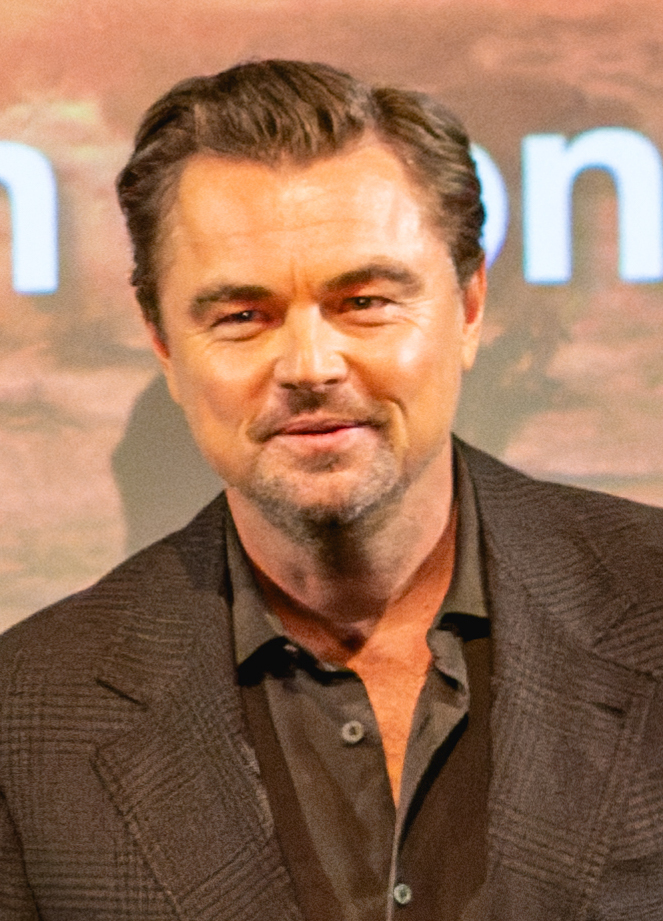
- DiCaprio in 2025
- Born: Leonardo Wilhelm DiCaprio; November 11, 1974 (age 52); Los Angeles, California, U.S.
- Occupations: Actor; film producer
- Years active: 1989–present
- Organizations: Appian Way Productions; Leonardo DiCaprio Foundation
- Works: Full list; Scorsese partnership
- Title: United Nations Messenger of Peace (designated 2014)
- Father: George DiCaprio
- Awards: Full list

Signature
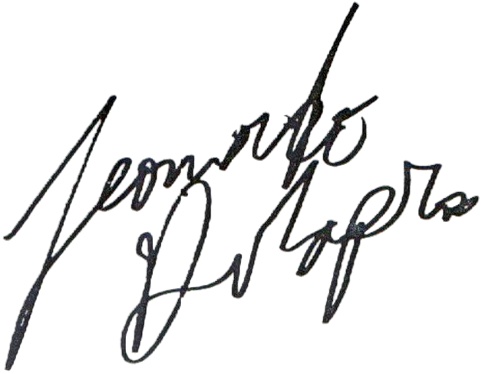

Leonardo Wilhelm DiCaprio (/diˈkæprioʊ/; Italian: [diˈkaːprjo]; born November 11, 1974) is an American actor and film producer. Regarded as one of Hollywood’s defining leading men, his work spans character-driven cinema and major blockbusters across genres, exploring themes of ambition, corruption, and moral decline. He is the recipient of numerous accolades, including an Academy Award, an Actor Award, a BAFTA Award, an Emmy Award, a Silver Bear and three Golden Globes. With his starring films grossing $7 billion worldwide, he has placed eight times in annual rankings of the world's highest-paid actors.

Born in Los Angeles, DiCaprio began his career in the late 1980s by appearing in television commercials. He had a starring role in the last season of the sitcom Growing Pains (1991–1992), and had his first major film part as author Tobias Wolff in This Boy's Life (1993). He received critical acclaim and his first Academy Award nomination for playing a developmentally disabled boy in What's Eating Gilbert Grape (1993). DiCaprio achieved international stardom with the star-crossed romances Romeo + Juliet (1996) and Titanic (1997). After the latter became the highest-grossing film in the world at the time, he attempted to shed his image as a romantic hero, seeking roles in other genres, including the 2002 crime dramas Catch Me If You Can and Gangs of New York; the latter marked the first of his many successful collaborations with director Martin Scorsese.

DiCaprio continued to gain acclaim for his performances in the biopic The Aviator (2004), the political thriller Blood Diamond (2006), the crime thriller The Departed (2006), the romantic drama Revolutionary Road (2008), the action thriller Inception (2010), the western Django Unchained (2012), the biopic The Wolf of Wall Street (2013), the survival drama The Revenant (2015)—for which he won the Academy Award for Best Actor—the comedy-drama Once Upon a Time in Hollywood (2019), the crime drama Killers of the Flower Moon (2023) and the action film One Battle After Another (2025).

DiCaprio is the founder of Appian Way Productions—a production company that has made some of his films and environmental documentaries, such as the series Greensburg (2008–2010)—and the Leonardo DiCaprio Foundation, a nonprofit organization devoted to promoting environmental awareness. A United Nations Messenger of Peace, he regularly supports charitable causes. In 2005, he was named a Commander of the Order of Arts and Letters for his contributions to the arts, and in 2016, he appeared in Time magazine's 100 most influential people in the world. DiCaprio was voted one of the 50 greatest actors of all time in a 2022 readers' poll by Empire magazine.

== Early life and acting background ==
Leonardo Wilhelm DiCaprio was born on November 11, 1974, in Los Angeles, California. He is the only child of Irmelin Indenbirken, a legal secretary from Germany, and George DiCaprio, an American underground comix artist and distributor. The couple met while attending college and moved to Los Angeles after graduating. George's paternal grandparents, Salvatore Di Caprio and Rosina Cassella, were Italian, while his mother, Olga Anne Jacobs, was of German descent. Irmelin's father, Wilhelm Indenbirken, was German, while her mother, Helene Indenbirken, was a Russian immigrant living in Germany. Some sources have falsely claimed that Helene was born in Odesa, Ukraine, but there is no evidence that DiCaprio has any relatives of Ukrainian birth or heritage.

DiCaprio got his name because his pregnant mother first felt him kick while she was looking at a Leonardo da Vinci painting in the Uffizi museum. When he was a year old, his parents divorced after his father fell in love with another woman and moved out. To raise DiCaprio together, his parents moved into twin cottages with a shared garden in Echo Park, Los Angeles. DiCaprio's father lived with his girlfriend and her son, Adam Farrar, with whom DiCaprio developed a close bond. DiCaprio and his mother later moved to other neighborhoods, such as Los Feliz. He has described his parents as "bohemian in every sense of the word" and as "the people I trust the most in the world". DiCaprio has mentioned growing up poor in a neighborhood plagued with prostitution, crime and violence. He was raised Catholic. DiCaprio attended the Los Angeles Center for Enriched Studies for four years and later Seeds Elementary School. He enrolled at John Marshall High School, but disliked public school and wanted to audition for acting jobs instead. He decided to drop out of high school, and later earned a general equivalency diploma (GED).

As a child, DiCaprio wanted to become either an actor or a marine biologist. He chose to pursue acting because he enjoyed imitating people and impersonating characters, and liked seeing people's reactions to his impressions. According to DiCaprio, his interest in performing began at the age of two, when he went onstage at a performance festival and danced spontaneously to a positive response from the crowd. He was also motivated to learn acting when his stepbrother's appearance in a television commercial earned him $50,000. DiCaprio has said in interviews that his first television appearance was in the children's series Romper Room, and that he was dismissed from the show for being disruptive. The show's host has denied that any children were removed from the show in this way. At age 11, DiCaprio almost quit acting to pursue breakdancing, after winning second place in a breakdancing competition in his mother's native Germany. Starting at age 14, he appeared in several commercials for Matchbox cars, which he calls his first role. DiCaprio also appeared in commercials for Kraft Singles, Bubble Yum, and Apple Jacks. In 1989, he played the role of Glen in two episodes of the television show The New Lassie.

At the beginning of his career, DiCaprio had difficulty finding an agent. When he finally found one, the agent suggested that he change his name to Lenny Williams to appeal to American audiences, which he refused to do. DiCaprio remained jobless for a year and a half, even despite 100 auditions. Following this frustrating lack of success, DiCaprio was about to give up acting but his father convinced him to persevere, and he continued to audition. After a talent agent (who knew a friend of his mother's) recommended him to casting directors, DiCaprio secured roles in about 20 commercials.

By the early 1990s, DiCaprio began acting regularly on television, beginning with a role in the pilot of The Outsiders (1990) and one episode of the soap opera Santa Barbara (1990), in which he played an alcoholic teenager. Following this, DiCaprio was cast in Parenthood, a series based on the 1989 comedy film. To prepare for the role of Garry Buckman, a troubled teen, he analyzed Joaquin Phoenix's performance in the original film. His work that year earned him two nominations at the 12th Youth in Film Awards—Best Young Actor in a Daytime Series for Santa Barbara and Best Young Actor Starring in a New Television Series for Parenthood. Around this time, he was a contestant on the children's game show Fun House; on the show he performed several stunts, including catching the fish inside a small pool using only his teeth.

== Career ==
=== 1991–1996: Early work and breakthrough ===
DiCaprio made his film debut in 1991 as the stepson of an unscrupulous landlord in the low-budget horror sequel Critters 3—a part he later described as "your average, no-depth, standard kid with blond hair". DiCaprio has stated that he prefers not to remember Critters 3, viewing it as "possibly one of the worst films of all time" and the kind of role he wanted to avoid in the future. Later in 1991, he became a recurring cast member on the sitcom Growing Pains, playing Luke Brower, a homeless boy who is taken in by the show's central family. Co-star Joanna Kerns recalls DiCaprio being "especially intelligent and disarming for his age" but she noted that he was also mischievous and jocular on set, and often made fun of his co-stars. DiCaprio was cast by the producers to appeal to young female audience, but his arrival did not improve the show's ratings and he left before the end of its run. He was nominated for a Young Artist Award for Best Young Actor Co-starring in a Television Series. DiCaprio also had an uncredited role in 1991 in one episode of Roseanne.

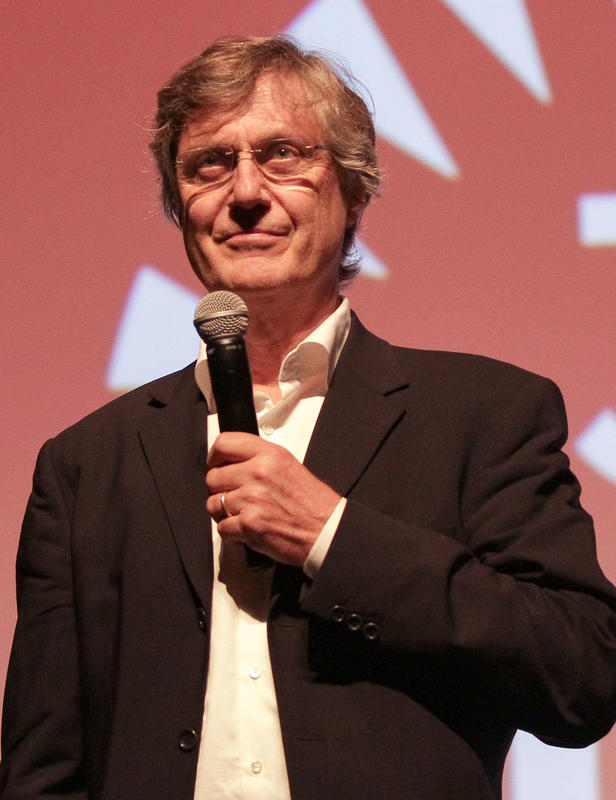
Lasse Hallström directed DiCaprio in What's Eating Gilbert Grape (1993), for which he earned his first Academy Award nomination.

In 1992, DiCaprio had a brief role in the first installment of the Poison Ivy film series, and was handpicked by Robert De Niro from a shortlist of 400 young actors to co-star with him in This Boy's Life. Adapted from the memoir by Tobias Wolff, the film focuses on the relationship between a rebellious teenager, Toby (DiCaprio), and his mother (Ellen Barkin) and abusive stepfather (De Niro). Director Michael Caton-Jones said that DiCaprio did not know how to behave on set; accordingly, Caton-Jones used a strict mentoring style, after which DiCaprio's behavior began to improve. Bilge Ebiri of Rolling Stone found that the powerful bond between Barkin and DiCaprio elevated the film, praising DiCaprio's portrayal of his character's complex growth from a rebellious teen to an independent young man. This Boy's Life was the first film that gained him recognition. DiCaprio's first talk show appearance was in 1992 on the Looseleaf Report, hosted by Victoria Looseleaf, who later wrote a 1998 (unauthorized) biography on him.

DiCaprio played the developmentally disabled brother of Johnny Depp's character in What's Eating Gilbert Grape (1993), a comedy-drama about a dysfunctional Iowa family. Caton-Jones recommended DiCaprio to director Lasse Hallström who was initially skeptical, as he considered DiCaprio too good-looking for the part. Hallström cast DiCaprio after he emerged as "the most observant" auditionee. To ensure authenticity in his portrayal, DiCaprio studied similarly impaired children and their mannerisms, and Hallström allowed him to create the character using his own researched attributes. The film became a critical success. At age 19, DiCaprio earned a National Board of Review Award, as well as nominations for a Golden Globe Award and an Academy Award for Best Supporting Actor, making him the seventh-youngest Oscar nominee in the category. "The film's real show-stopping turn comes from Mr. DiCaprio," wrote The New York Times critic Janet Maslin, "who makes Arnie's many tics so startling and vivid that at first he is difficult to watch. The performance has a sharp, desperate intensity from beginning to end." Caryn James, also writing for The New York Times, said of his performances in This Boy's Life and What's Eating Gilbert Grape: "He made the raw, emotional neediness of those boys completely natural and powerful."

DiCaprio's first role of 1995 was in Sam Raimi's Western The Quick and the Dead. When Sony Pictures became dubious over DiCaprio's casting, co-star Sharon Stone paid his salary herself. The film was released to dismal box office performance and mixed reviews from critics. DiCaprio next starred as a teenage Jim Carroll, a drug-addicted high school basketball player and budding writer, in the biopic The Basketball Diaries. He starred in the erotic drama Total Eclipse (1995), driven by the desire to showcase an exceptional performance, which would focus on his acting talent rather than his much-discussed physical appeal. Directed by Agnieszka Holland, it is a fictionalized account of the same-sex relationship between Arthur Rimbaud (DiCaprio) and Paul Verlaine (David Thewlis). DiCaprio was cast when River Phoenix died before filming began. Although the film failed commercially, it has been included in the catalog of the Warner Archive Collection, which releases classic and cult films from Warner Bros.' library on home video. A review in the San Francisco Chronicle called DiCaprio "his generation's great acting promise" but criticized the mismatch between Thewlis's "cultivated" British accent and DiCaprio's "Southern California twang".

DiCaprio next starred opposite Claire Danes in Baz Luhrmann's Romeo + Juliet (1996), an abridged modernization of William Shakespeare's romantic tragedy, which retained the original Shakespearean dialogue. DiCaprio was initially unsure about another Romeo and Juliet adaptation, but at his father's suggestion, he agreed to examine Luhrmann's work more closely. DiCaprio and Luhrmann then spent a two-week workshop exchanging ideas, which led to the collaboration. Romeo + Juliet established DiCaprio as a leading Hollywood actor; according to film scholar Murray Pomerance, DiCaprio's newfound popularity helped the film become profitable only days after its release. Reviewing DiCaprio's early works, David Thomson of The Guardian called DiCaprio "a revelation" in What's Eating Gilbert Grape, "very moving" in This Boy's Life, "suitably desperate" in The Basketball Diaries and "a vital spark" in Romeo + Juliet. The latter earned DiCaprio a Silver Bear for Best Actor at the 1997 Berlin International Film Festival. He then portrayed a young man who has been committed to a mental asylum in Marvin's Room (1996), a family drama about two estranged sisters, played by Meryl Streep and Diane Keaton, who are reunited through tragedy. He played Hank, the troubled son of Streep's character. Lisa Schwarzbaum of Entertainment Weekly praised "the deeply gifted DiCaprio" for holding his own against veteran actresses Keaton and Streep, describing the three as "full-bodied and so powerfully affecting that you're carried along on the pleasure of being in the presence of their extraordinary talent".

=== 1997–2001: Titanic and worldwide recognition ===
DiCaprio rejected a role in Boogie Nights (1997) to star opposite Kate Winslet in James Cameron's Titanic as members of different social classes who fall in love aboard RMS Titanic. DiCaprio had doubts, but was encouraged by Cameron to pursue the part. With a production budget of more than $200 million, Titanic was the most expensive in history at the time. It became the highest-grossing film at the time, earning more than $2.1 billion in box-office receipts worldwide. (Note: Titanic grossed $1.84 billion at the time of its release. After a re-release in 3D in 2012, it earned an additional $343.6 million worldwide, totaling up to $2.18 billion.) It won 11 Academy Awards—the most wins for any film—including Best Picture; DiCaprio's failure to gain a nomination led to a protest against the Academy of Motion Picture Arts and Sciences by more than 200 fans. He was nominated for other high-profile awards, including a Golden Globe Award for Best Actor.

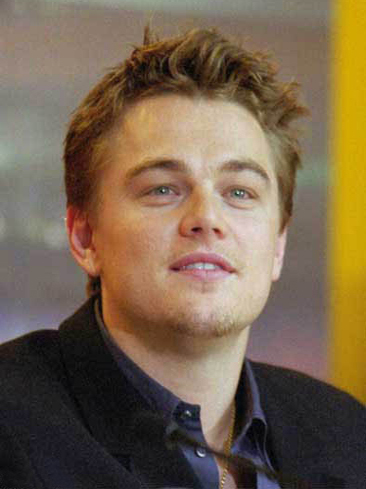
DiCaprio at a press conference for The Beach in 2000

Titanic transformed DiCaprio into a superstar, drawing adoration among teenage girls and young women that became known as "Leo-mania". The success bolstered DiCaprio's standing as a teen idol and romantic lead, an image from which he sought to dissociate himself. Despite the film's success and its positive influence on his career, in 2025 DiCaprio said he regretted the decision to turn down Boogie Nights, saying it was "a profound movie of my generation".

In his 2015 Rolling Stone article, Ebiri called the Titanic role DiCaprio's best, writing that he and Winslet "infuse their earnest back-and-forth with so much genuine emotion that it's hard not to get swept up in their doomed love affair". A writer for Vanity Fair in 2008 labeled them "Hollywood's most iconic screen couple" since Humphrey Bogart and Ingrid Bergman. Writing about her first viewing of Titanic in 2017, Vox contributor Alissa Wilkinson described DiCaprio's "boyish charm" and found his performance "natural and unaffected".

DiCaprio had a brief featured role in Woody Allen's 1998 satire of fame, Celebrity. Ebiri labeled DiCaprio "the best thing in the film". That year, he also took on the dual roles of villainous King Louis XIV and his secret, sympathetic twin brother Philippe in Randall Wallace's The Man in the Iron Mask, with common elements from the 1939 film and a 1929 film with Douglas Fairbanks. It received mixed reviews, but grossed $180 million against a budget of $35 million. Entertainment Weekly critic Owen Gleiberman wrote that DiCaprio did not look old enough to play the part, but praised him as "a fluid and instinctive actor, with the face of a mischievous angel". The Guardian's Alex von Tunzelmann was similarly impressed with the actor's performance but found his talent wasted in the film. DiCaprio won a Golden Raspberry Award for Worst Screen Couple for the dual roles in 1999.

Following the release of Titanic, and The Man in the Iron Mask, DeCaprio chose to reduce his workload "to learn to hear [his] own voice in choosing the roles" that he wanted to pursue. He said in 2000: "I have no connection with me during that whole Titanic phenomenon and what my face became around the world [...] I'll never reach that state of popularity again, and I don't expect to [...] It's not something I'm going to try to achieve either."

DiCaprio was next cast to star in an earlier version of American Psycho (2000) for a reported salary of $20 million; after disagreements with Oliver Stone on the film's direction, DiCaprio left the project, taking the lead role in The Beach instead. Adapted from Alex Garland's 1996 novel, the film saw him play a backpacking American tourist who ends up in a secret island commune in the Gulf of Thailand. Budgeted at $50 million, the film earned almost three times that at the box office, but was negatively reviewed by critics, and earned him a nomination for the Golden Raspberry Award for Worst Actor. Todd McCarthy of Variety thought DiCaprio gave a compelling performance but his character lacked defining qualities. The film received criticism for damaging the filming location in Thailand, after which DiCaprio worked to restore the area. After shooting The Beach, DiCaprio auditioned for Luhrmann's Moulin Rouge! (2001) but was rejected; He later asserted it was due to his poor singing abilities.

In the mid-1990s, DiCaprio agreed to be in the mostly improvised black-and-white short film Don's Plum as a favor to aspiring director R. D. Robb. When Robb expanded it to a full-length film in the early 2000s to capitalize on the fame of DiCaprio and co-star Tobey Maguire, DiCaprio and Maguire had its release blocked in the US and Canada by court order, arguing they never intended to make a feature film. The film premiered at the 2001 Berlin International Film Festival but remains obscure.

=== 2002–2009: Work with Martin Scorsese and film production ===
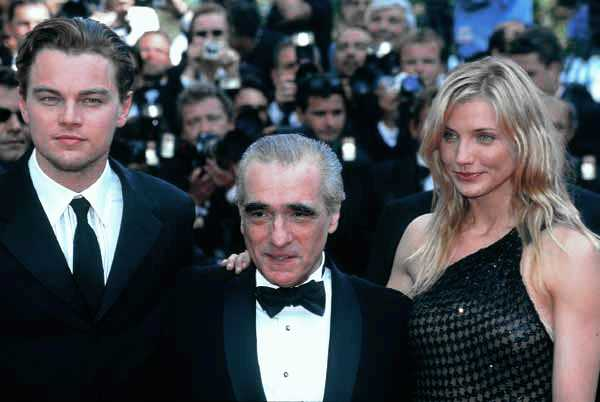
DiCaprio attending an event for Gangs of New York with Martin Scorsese and Cameron Diaz at the 2002 Cannes Film Festival

DiCaprio turned down the role of Anakin Skywalker in Star Wars: Episode II – Attack of the Clones (2002), feeling unprepared to "take that dive" at the time. His first film that year was the biopic Catch Me If You Can, based on the life of Frank Abagnale Jr., who before his 19th birthday committed check fraud to make millions in the 1960s. Directed by Steven Spielberg, the film was shot across 147 different locations in 52 days, making it "the most adventurous, super-charged movie-making" DiCaprio had experienced yet. The film received critical acclaim and grossed $355 million against a budget of $52 million, becoming his second highest-grossing release after Titanic. Roger Ebert praised his departure from dark and troubled characters, and two Entertainment Weekly critics in 2018 called it DiCaprio's best role, labeling him "delightfully persuasive, deceptive, flirtatious, and sometimes tragic—and we dare you to find a better role, if you can". DiCaprio received his third Golden Globe nomination for his performance in the film.

Also in 2002, DiCaprio starred in Martin Scorsese's Gangs of New York, a historical drama set in the mid-19th century in the Five Points district of New York City. Scorsese initially struggled selling his idea of realizing the film until DiCaprio became interested in starring in the film, and thus Miramax Films got involved with financing the project. Nonetheless, production on the film was plagued by overshooting of budgets and producer-director disagreements, resulting in an eight-month shoot. With a budget of $103 million, the film was the most expensive Scorsese had ever made. DiCaprio was drawn to playing Amsterdam Vallon, the young leader of an Irish-American street gang, as it marked a shift from "boyish" roles to a mature leading man. Gangs of New York earned $193 million worldwide and received positive critical response. Anne Thompson of The Observer took note of DiCaprio's "low-key, sturdy performance", but felt that co-star Daniel Day-Lewis overshadowed him.

In 2004, DiCaprio founded the production company Appian Way Productions, a namesake of the Italian road. He was interested in finding unique source material and preserving its essence during development, citing previous experiences where the involvement of too many people influenced the final product in a negative way. DiCaprio first executive-produced The Assassination of Richard Nixon, which starred Sean Penn as Samuel Byck, and was screened at the 2004 Cannes Film Festival. DiCaprio and Scorsese reunited for a biopic of Howard Hughes, an American film director and aviation pioneer suffering from obsessive–compulsive disorder, in The Aviator (2004), which DiCaprio also co-produced under Appian Way. He initially developed the project with Michael Mann who was eventually replaced by Scorsese. The Aviator became a critical and financial success, grossing $213 million against its budget of $110 million. Simond Braund of Empire thought DiCaprio convincingly played a complex role and highlighted the scenes depicting Hughes's paranoia and obsession. He received his first Golden Globe Award for Best Actor – Motion Picture Drama and nominations for an Academy Award, a BAFTA Award and a Screen Actors Guild Award.

In 2006, DiCaprio starred in the crime film The Departed and the political war thriller Blood Diamond. In Scorsese's The Departed, DiCaprio played the role of Billy Costigan, a state trooper working undercover in the Irish Mob in Boston, someone he characterizes as being in a "constant 24-hour panic attack". DiCaprio especially liked the experience of working with co-star Jack Nicholson, describing a scene with him as "one of the most memorable moments" of his life as an actor. In preparation, he visited Boston to interact with people associated with the Irish Mob and gained 15 pounds (6.8 kg) of muscle. Critically acclaimed, the film grossed $291 million against a budget of $90 million, becoming DiCaprio and Scorsese's highest-grossing collaboration to that point. Peter Travers of Rolling Stone praised DiCaprio's and co-star Matt Damon's performances as "explosive, emotionally complex", but felt that Nicholson overshadowed the two. Despite DiCaprio's leading role in The Departed, the film's distributor Warner Bros. Pictures submitted his performance for a Best Supporting Actor nomination at the AMPAS to avoid internal conflict with his part in Blood Diamond. Instead, his co-star Mark Wahlberg was nominated, though DiCaprio earned other accolades for The Departed, including a Satellite Award for Best Supporting Actor and Best Actor nominations at the Golden Globes and BAFTA Awards.

In Blood Diamond, DiCaprio starred as a diamond smuggler from Rhodesia who is involved in the Sierra Leone Civil War. While filming, he worked with 24 orphaned children from the SOS Children's Village in Maputo, Mozambique, and said he was touched by his interactions with them. To prepare, he spent six months in Africa, learned about camouflage from people in South African military and interviewed and recorded people in the country to improve his accent. The film received generally favorable reviews, and DiCaprio was noted for his South African accent, which is generally known as difficult to imitate. Claudia Puig of the USA Today approvingly highlighted DiCaprio's transition from a boy to a man on screen, and Ann Hornaday of The Washington Post similarly noted his growth as an actor since The Departed. DiCaprio received nominations for an Academy Award and a Golden Globe for Blood Diamond.

In 2007, DiCaprio produced the comedy drama Gardener of Eden, which according to The Hollywood Reporter's Frank Scheck "lack[ed] the necessary dramatic urgency or black humor to connect with audiences". Later that year, he produced, co-wrote and narrated The 11th Hour, a documentary on the state of the natural environment that won the Earthwatch Environmental Film Award in 2008. DiCaprio's Appian Way produced Planet Green's Greensburg (2008–2010), which ran for three seasons. Set in Greensburg, Kansas, it is about rebuilding the town in a sustainable way after being hit by the 2007 Greensburg tornado. Also in 2008, DiCaprio starred in Body of Lies, a spy film based on the novel of the same name. He played one of three agents battling a terrorist organization in the Middle East. Considering the film to be a throwback to political features of the 1970s like The Parallax View (1974) and Three Days of the Condor (1975), DiCaprio dyed his hair brown and wore brown contacts for the role. The film received mixed reviews from critics, and grossed $118 million against a budget of $67.5 million.

Later in 2008, DiCaprio collaborated with Kate Winslet for the drama Revolutionary Road, directed by her then-husband Sam Mendes. As both actors had been reluctant to make romantic films similar to Titanic, it was Winslet who suggested that they both work with her on a film adaptation of the 1961 eponymous novel by Richard Yates. She found that the script, by Justin Haythe, had little in common with the 1997 blockbuster. Playing a couple in a failing marriage in the 1950s, DiCaprio and Winslet spent some time together in preparation, and DiCaprio felt claustrophobic on the small set they used. He saw his character as "unheroic", "slightly cowardly" and someone "willing to be just a product of his environment". Peter Travers liked DiCaprio's pairing with Winslet and his multi-layered portrayal of an overwhelmed character, and Marshall Sella of GQ called it the "most mature and memorable performance of his lifetime". DiCaprio earned his seventh Golden Globes nomination for the film. Revolutionary Road grossed $75.9 million against its budget of $35 million. He ended the 2000s by producing director Jaume Collet-Serra's psychological horror thriller film Orphan (2009), starring Vera Farmiga, Peter Sarsgaard and Isabelle Fuhrman. Although the film received mixed reviews, it was a commercial success.

=== 2010–2013: Films with high-profile directors ===
DiCaprio continued to collaborate with Scorsese in the 2010 psychological thriller film Shutter Island, based on the 2003 novel of the same name by Dennis Lehane. He played Edward "Teddy" Daniels, a U.S. Marshal investigating a psychiatric facility located on an island, who comes to question his own sanity. DiCaprio and Scorsese became interested in the project in 2007, and the former co-produced the film under Appian Way with Phoenix Pictures. Because of the film's disturbing scenes, DiCaprio had nightmares of mass murder during production and considered relaxing with his friends a form of therapy. The film was released to mixed reviews; Peter Bradshaw of The Guardian praised Scorsese's direction and the acting but criticized its twist ending. Peter Travers called it DiCaprio's "most haunting and emotionally complex performance yet", and particularly liked his cave scene with co-star Patricia Clarkson. The film was a commercial success, grossing $294 million worldwide against a budget of $80 million.

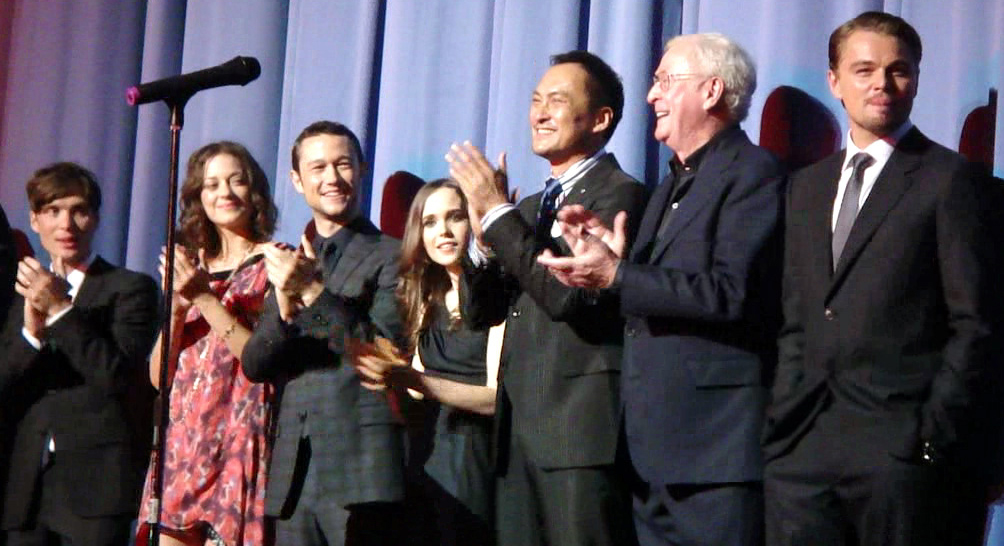
DiCaprio (first from the right) with the cast of Inception at the film's premiere in 2010

DiCaprio's second role in 2010 was in Christopher Nolan's critically acclaimed ensemble science-fiction film Inception. Inspired by the experience of lucid dreaming and dream incubation, the film features Dom Cobb (DiCaprio), an "extractor" who enters the dreams of others to obtain information that is otherwise inaccessible. Cobb is promised a chance to regain his old life in exchange for planting an idea in a corporate target's mind. DiCaprio was fascinated with the idea of a "dream-heist" and the potential for his character to manipulate his dreamworld and impact his real life. Made on a budget of $160 million, the film grossed $836 million worldwide to become DiCaprio's second highest-grossing film. To star in this film, DiCaprio agreed to a pay cut from his $20 million fee and opted for a share in first-dollar gross points, which entitled him to a percentage of the cinema ticket sales. The risk proved fruitful, as DiCaprio earned $50 million from the film, becoming his highest payday yet.

DiCaprio starred as J. Edgar Hoover in Clint Eastwood's J. Edgar (2011). A biopic about Hoover, the film focuses on his career as an FBI director, including an examination of his private life as an alleged closeted homosexual. Critics felt that the film lacked coherence overall but commended DiCaprio's performance. Roger Ebert praised DiCaprio's ability to bring depth and nuance to the character, suggesting that his performance conveyed aspects of Hoover's personality that were possibly even unknown to the man himself. Also in 2011, he produced Catherine Hardwicke's romantic horror film Red Riding Hood. Though it was named one of the ten worst films of 2011 by Time magazine, it had moderate box-office returns. Also that year, DiCaprio's Appian Way produced George Clooney's political drama The Ides of March, an adaptation of Beau Willimon's 2008 play Farragut North.

In 2012, DiCaprio starred as plantation owner Calvin Candie in Quentin Tarantino's Spaghetti Western, Django Unchained. After reading the script, DiCaprio felt uncomfortable with the extent of racism portrayed in the film, but his co-stars and Tarantino convinced him not to sugarcoat it. While filming, DiCaprio accidentally cut his hand on glass, but continued filming, and Tarantino elected to use the take in the final product. The film received critical acclaim; a writer for Wired magazine commended him for playing a villainous role and found his performance "blood-chilling". The film earned DiCaprio a Golden Globe Award nomination for Best Supporting Actor. Django Unchained grossed $425 million worldwide on a production budget of $100 million.

In January 2013, DiCaprio said he would take a long break from acting to "fly around the world doing good for the environment". That year, he had four releases as an actor and a producer. His first was in the role of millionaire Jay Gatsby in Baz Luhrmann's The Great Gatsby, an adaptation of F. Scott Fitzgerald's 1925 novel of the same name, co-starring Carey Mulligan and Tobey Maguire. The film received mixed reviews from critics, but DiCaprio's performance was praised and earned him the AACTA Award for Best Actor in a Leading Role. Critic Rafer Guzman of Newsday wrote that DiCaprio was not only "tough [...] but also vulnerable, touching, funny, a faker, a human. It's a tremendous, hard-won performance." Matt Zoller Seitz of Roger Ebert's website described his performance as "the movie's greatest and simplest special effect", and "iconic—maybe his career best". The film grossed $353 million worldwide, more than three times its budget. Three films were produced by DiCaprio under Appian Way in 2013—the ensemble crime thriller Runner Runner, which The Guardian's Xan Brooks described as "a lazy, trashy film that barely goes through the motions"; the commercially failed thriller Out of the Furnace; and the black comedy-drama The Wolf of Wall Street.

DiCaprio reunited with Scorsese for the fifth time in The Wolf of the Wall Street, a film based on the life of stockbroker Jordan Belfort (played by DiCaprio), who was arrested in the late 1990s for securities fraud and money laundering. DiCaprio wanted to play Belfort ever since he had read his autobiography and won a bidding war with Warner Bros. against Brad Pitt and Paramount Pictures for the rights to Belfort's memoir in 2007. He was fond of Belfort's honest and unapologetic portrayal of his actual experiences in the book, and was inspired by the 2008 financial crisis to make the film. The Wolf of Wall Street received positive reviews for Scorsese's and DiCaprio's work together. The Hollywood Reporter's Todd McCarthy lauded DiCaprio for fully realizing his character's potential with a carefree performance. Jonathan Romney of Film Comment wrote that DiCaprio displays a great deal of comedic talent, excelling in "rubber-limbed slapstick" humor. The film earned him the Golden Globe Award for Best Actor – Motion Picture Musical or Comedy and nominations for a BAFTA Award for Best Actor in a Leading Role, as well as Academy Awards for Best Actor and Best Picture.

=== 2014–present: Environmental documentaries and awards success ===
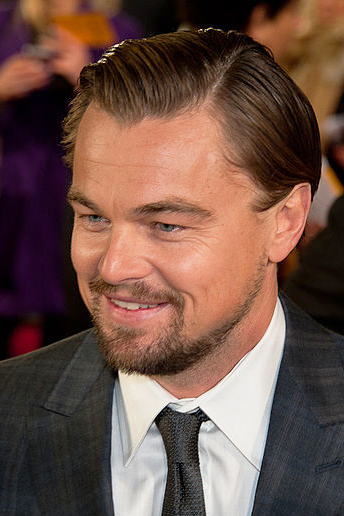
DiCaprio in 2014

DiCaprio was an executive producer on Virunga, a 2014 British documentary film about four people fighting to protect the world's last mountain gorillas from war and poaching. The film premiered at the Tribeca Film Festival in April 2014, and DiCaprio was nominated for the 2015 Primetime Emmy Award for Outstanding Documentary or Nonfiction Special. Cowspiracy: The Sustainability Secret was another documentary film that year for which he was an executive producer—he took part in the new cut released exclusively on Netflix that September. It explores the impact of animal agriculture on the environment. DiCaprio is a patron of The Gorilla Organization, a UK-based charity continuing Dian Fossey's work to protect gorillas in the Virungas.

In 2015, DiCaprio produced and played fur trapper Hugh Glass in Alejandro G. Iñárritu's survival drama The Revenant. DiCaprio found his role in the film difficult; he had to eat a raw slab of bison's liver and sleep in animal carcasses. He also learned to shoot a musket, build a fire, speak two Native American languages (Pawnee and Arikara) and apply ancient healing techniques. Built on a budget of $135 million, the film earned $533 million worldwide. The film received positive reviews with particular praise for DiCaprio's acting. Mark Kermode of The Guardian wrote that DiCaprio shone with a performance that prioritizes physicality over speech, and Nick De Semlyen of Empire noted that he uplifted the film. The film earned him numerous awards, including the Academy Award, BAFTA, Critics' Choice, Golden Globe and SAG Award for Best Actor. For the next three years, DiCaprio narrated documentaries and served as a producer for films.

In 2016, he was an executive producer for The Ivory Game and Catching the Sun; he also produced, hosted and narrated the documentary Before the Flood about climate change. He produced the crime drama Live by Night (2016), which received unenthusiastic reviews and failed to recoup its $65 million production budget. His next production ventures were in 2018—the psychological horror Delirium and the commercially failed action–adventure Robin Hood.

After producing and narrating the 2019 global warming documentary Ice on Fire, DiCaprio returned to acting following a four-year break in Quentin Tarantino's comedy-drama Once Upon a Time in Hollywood, which traces the relationship between Rick Dalton (DiCaprio), an aging television actor and his stuntman, Cliff Booth (Brad Pitt). To help the film's financing, DiCaprio and Pitt agreed to take a pay cut, and they each received $10 million. DiCaprio liked working with Pitt, and Tarantino described the pair as the most exciting since Robert Redford and Paul Newman. DiCaprio was fascinated with the film's homage to Hollywood and focus on the friendship between his and Pitt's characters. He drew from real-life experience of witnessing the struggles and rejections of his actor friends in the industry. The film premiered at the 2019 Cannes Film Festival, where critics praised his and Pitt's performances. A writer for Business Insider called it one of the best performances of DiCaprio's career, and Ian Sandwell of Digital Spy particularly liked the duo's chemistry, believing their scenes together to be some of the film's strongest parts. DiCaprio received nominations for an Oscar, a Golden Globe, a BAFTA Award and a Screen Actors Guild Award for Best Actor. The film earned $374 million against a budget of $90 million.

In 2020, DiCaprio served as an executive producer for The Right Stuff, a television series adaption of the 1973 namesake book. After being in development at National Geographic, it was released on Disney+. That May, DiCaprio briefly featured in the finale of the miniseries The Last Dance. In 2021, DiCaprio appeared in Adam McKay's satirical comedy Don't Look Up. He spent five months changing the film's script with McKay before agreeing to the part. Starring alongside Jennifer Lawrence as two astronomers attempting to warn humanity about an extinction-level comet, DiCaprio saw this film as an analogy of the world's indifference to the climate crisis. As a frequent supporter of environmentalism, DiCaprio said he has often looked to star in and make films tackling issues related to it, something he found hard due to people's inability to listen. He praised McKay for envisioning a project on how humans would react to a serious issue from a political, social and scientific standpoint. While reviews for the film were mixed, most critics praised DiCaprio's and Lawrence's performances; journalists from Digital Spy and NDTV lauded their pairing. DiCaprio earned nominations for a Golden Globe and a BAFTA Award for the film. It broke the record for the most views (152 million hours) in a single week in Netflix history.

DiCaprio next starred in Scorsese's crime drama Killers of the Flower Moon (2023) based on the book of the same name by David Grann, for which he was paid $30 million. Initially signed for the heroic part of FBI agent Thomas Bruce White Sr., DiCaprio insisted on playing the morally complex role of murderer Ernest Burkhart, leading to extensive script rewrites. Declaring it the best performance of DiCaprio's career, IndieWire's David Ehrlich wrote that "his nuanced and uncompromising turn as the cretinous Ernest Burkhart mines new wonders from the actor's long-standing lack of vanity". He received another Golden Globe nomination for his performance. DiCaprio next starred in Paul Thomas Anderson's film One Battle After Another (2025), alongside Sean Penn and Regina Hall. For his role as a washed-up ex-revolutionary, he received his seventh Academy Award acting nomination.

In December 2025, DiCaprio confirmed he has been cast in an undisclosed role in Michael Mann's planned sequel to the 1995 film Heat. As of February 2026, DiCaprio began shooting What Happens at Night, helmed by Martin Scorsese, also starring Jennifer Lawrence and Mads Mikkelsen.

== Reception and acting style ==
Early in his career, DiCaprio gained a reputation for his reckless behavior and intense partying with a group of male celebrities dubbed "the Pussy Posse" in the 1990s. In an infamous article published by New York magazine in 1998, journalist Nancy Jo Sales criticized the group as men whose pursuit was to "chase girls, pick fights and not tip the waitress". While parachuting, DiCaprio almost got himself and friend Justin Herwick killed when his parachute failed to open, after which his instructor opened the reserve parachute. In response, DiCaprio said he is fond of doing things that scare him. John McCain, who was a United States Senator for Arizona, called him "an androgynous wimp". DiCaprio found people's perception of him exaggerated, adding, "They want you miserable, just like them. They don't want heroes; what they want is to see you fall." His Catch Me If You Can director Steven Spielberg defended DiCaprio's reputation as a "party boy", believing it is a common behavior for young people and describing him as a family-oriented person during the film's production. Considering DiCaprio to be conscious of his public reputation, The New York Times' Caryn James credited him as one of the few actors to use his celebrity to further social causes. Carole Cadwalladr of The Guardian wrote that DiCaprio is "polite, charming, makes jokes, engages eye contact. And manages [...] to give almost no hint whatsoever of his actual personality."

Life can get pretty monotonous. Acting is like living multiple lives. When you make a movie, you go off to different places, live different cultures, investigate somebody else's reality, and you try to manifest that to the best of your ability. It is incredibly eye-opening. That's why I love acting. There's nothing as transformative as what a film, a documentary, can do to get people to care about something else besides their own lives.

— DiCaprio on his love of acting

DiCaprio is regarded as one of the finest actors of his generation. (Note: Attributed to multiple references) In a 2022 readers' poll by Empire, he was voted one of the 50 greatest actors of all time. The magazine praised his willingness to "go to the ends of the earth (often literally) to get under his characters' skin". Colin Covert of The Seattle Times similarly believed DiCaprio "redefines film stardom" through his willingness to take on challenging roles that few of his contemporaries are capable of performing.

Since his international stardom with Titanic (1997), he has admitted feeling nervous about starring in big-budget studio films because of their hype and marketing campaigns. As an actor, he views film as a "relevant art form, like a painting or sculpture. A hundred years from now, people will still be watching that movie." He often plays roles based on real-life people and stories told in specific periods. According to Caryn James, DiCaprio is unafraid of working with established directors on unconventional projects; taking such risks has led him to star in failed films like The Beach (2000), but also his successful collaborations with Martin Scorsese. DiCaprio has described his relationship with Scorsese as dreamlike and admires his knowledge of film, crediting the director with having taught him its history and importance. Scorsese has commented on DiCaprio's ability to repeatedly demonstrate emotion on screen. Jesse Hassenger of The A.V. Club considers the duo's collaborations—which earned them the 2013 National Board of Review (Spotlight Award)—to be career-defining moments for both of them and as vital as Scorsese's acclaimed collaborations with Robert De Niro.

Author Michael K. Hammond wrote that DiCaprio built his star reputation by demonstrating his acting ability, and praised him for "revealing a character while concealing the actor" and "disappearing into [his] roles". According to Agnieszka Holland, who directed DiCaprio in Total Eclipse (1995), DiCaprio is "one of the most mature actors" she has worked with and is "courageous" in his choice of roles. Holland remarked that he does not rely on method acting but rather on a trick that allows him to truly "become the character". His Marvin's Room co-star Meryl Streep said that DiCaprio possesses the kind of unpredictability that makes his career difficult to classify, his life precarious and his work thrilling. Analyzing DiCaprio's career, film critic Philip French identified a theme of "characters who are still in the process of becoming a man" and suggested that the actor's propensity for films about dysfunctional families and characters seeking father figures alludes to his own troubled childhood. DiCaprio often plays characters who themselves are playing roles, which Caryn James says looks simple on screen but requires sophisticated acting. He tends to play antiheroes and characters who lose their mental stability as the narrative progresses. Derek Thompson of The Atlantic argued that DiCaprio gives his best performances when playing "frauds and cheats and double-crossing liars and mercenaries".

Several media publications, such as People, Empire and Harper's Bazaar, have included DiCaprio in their listings of the most attractive actors. In 1998, he sued Playgirl magazine over plans to publish a fully nude picture of him. He has said he does not believe in focusing on appearance—as this is only temporary and can negatively affect one's profession in the industry—and looks for career longevity instead. In 2005, DiCaprio was made a commander of the Ordre des Arts et des Lettres by the French Minister of Culture for his contributions to the arts. In 2016, he was named one of the 100 most influential people in the world by Time magazine. He was included on Forbes' annual list of the world's highest-paid actors in 2008 and from 2010 to 2016 with respective earnings of $45 million, $28 million, $77 million, $37 million, $39 million, $39 million, $29 million and $27 million, topping the list in 2011. The magazine has commended DiCaprio's ability to star in risky, R-rated films that become box office successes. The Hollywood Reporter listed him as one of the 100 most powerful people in entertainment from 2016 to 2019. A writer for the same magazine credits DiCaprio as the rare actor to have a successful career "without ever having made a comic book movie, family film or pre-branded franchise. Leo is the franchise." In a 2016 analysis of his career trajectory, Stacey Wilson Hunt of New York magazine opined that DiCaprio, unlike most of his contemporaries, had not starred in a bad film in the previous ten years. Of his success, DiCaprio says, "My attitude is the same as when I started. I feel very connected to that fifteen-year-old kid who got his first movie."

DiCaprio has named Robert De Niro and James Dean as two of his favorite and most influential actors, stating "There were a lot of great actors I really fell in love with, but if I were to pick two, from different generations, it would be De Niro and James Dean". When asked about a performance that stayed with him the most, DiCaprio responded, "I remember being incredibly moved by Jimmy Dean, in East of Eden. There was something so raw and powerful about that performance. His vulnerability [...] his confusion about his entire history, his identity, his desperation to be loved. That performance just broke my heart."

== Other ventures ==
=== Activism ===
Climate change is real, it is happening right now. It is the most urgent threat facing our entire species, and we need to work collectively together and stop procrastinating. We need to support leaders around the world who do not speak for the big polluters, but who speak for all of humanity, for the indigenous people of the world, for the billions and billions of underprivileged people out there who would be most affected by this. For our children's children, and for those people out there whose voices have been drowned out by the politics of greed.

— DiCaprio during his acceptance speech at the 88th Academy Awards, 2016

An active celebrity in the climate change movement, DiCaprio believes global warming is the world's "number-one environmental challenge". Eager to learn about ecology from an early age, he would watch documentaries on rainforest depletion and the loss of species and habitats. In 1998, he established the Leonardo DiCaprio Foundation, a non-profit organization devoted to promoting environmental awareness. It supports organizations and campaigns committed to ensuring a viable future for planet Earth, and produced the short web documentaries Water Planet and Global Warning. The foundation has also funded debt-for-nature swaps. By 2018, the foundation had funded more than 200 projects, providing $100 million in support. He has been an active supporter of numerous environmental organizations and sat on the board of the World Wildlife Fund and International Fund for Animal Welfare.

DiCaprio has owned environment-friendly electric-hybrid vehicles. His use of private jets and large yachts have been criticized as hypocritical due to their large carbon footprints. DiCaprio chaired the national Earth Day celebration in 2000 where he interviewed Bill Clinton and they discussed plans to deal with global warming and the environment. He presented at the 2007 American leg of Live Earth. DiCaprio donated $1 million to the Wildlife Conservation Society at Russia's Tiger Summit. DiCaprio's persistence in reaching the event after encountering two plane delays caused then Prime Minister Vladimir Putin to describe him as a "muzhik" or "real man". In 2013, he organized a benefit fine art auction, "11th Hour", which raised nearly $38.8 million for his foundation. In September 2014, United Nations Secretary-General Ban Ki-moon designated DiCaprio as a United Nations Messenger of Peace with a focus on climate change. Later that month, he made an opening statement to members of the UN Climate Summit; his speech reached an estimated one billion people worldwide. In 2015, he announced his intention to divest from fossil fuels. He again spoke at the UN in April 2016 prior to the signing of the Paris Climate Change Agreement.

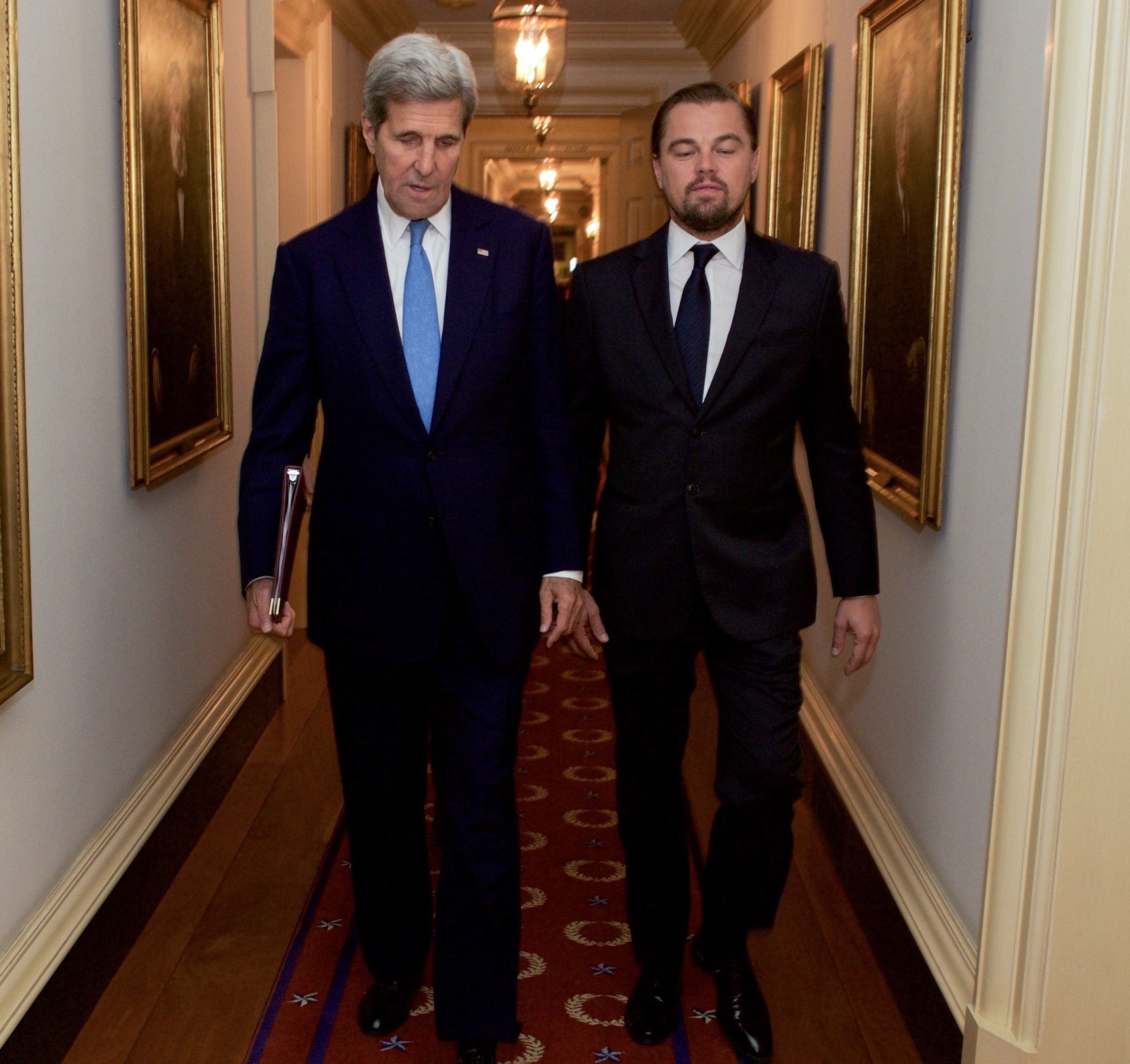
U.S. Secretary of State John Kerry and DiCaprio at the Our Ocean Conference in 2016

At a 2016 meeting with Pope Francis, DiCaprio donated to charity and discussed environmental issues with him. A few days later, possibly influenced by this meeting, the Pope said he would act in a charity film. (Note: The Pope appeared in the faith-based charity film Beyond the Sun, whose profits were donated to charities in Argentina.) DiCaprio traveled to Indonesia in early 2016 where he criticized the government's palm oil industry's slash-and-burn forest clearing methods. In July 2016, his foundation donated $15.6 million to help protect wildlife and the rights of Native Americans, along with mitigating climate change. That October, DiCaprio joined Mark Ruffalo in support of the Standing Rock tribe's opposition to the Dakota Access Pipeline.

In April 2017, DiCaprio protested against President Donald Trump's inaction on climate change by attending the People's Climate March. In July, a charity auction and celebrity concert arranged by DiCaprio's foundation had raised over $30 million in one night. The DiCaprio foundation donated $100 million in December 2018 to fight climate change. In May 2021, DiCaprio pledged $43 million to enact conservation operations across the Galápagos Islands.

=== Politics ===
DiCaprio endorsed Democratic candidate John Kerry in the 2004 United States presidential election. DiCaprio endorsed Democratic candidate Hillary Clinton for the 2016 United States presidential election. In March 2020, DiCaprio attended a fundraiser for Joe Biden at the home of Paramount Pictures executive Sherry Lansing. Prior to the 2020 election, DiCaprio narrated a Netflix documentary series about voting rights, stating, "All of us may have been created equal. But we'll never actually be equal until we all vote. So don't wait." On social media, DiCaprio urged voters to make a plan to cast their ballots and to draw attention to voter suppression and restrictive voter ID laws, citing VoteRiders as a source of information and assistance. In 2023, DiCaprio testified during the trial against Prakazrel Michel, who is being accused of participating in a foreign influence campaign that was aimed at the Obama and Trump administrations. In 2024, DiCaprio formally endorsed Kamala Harris for president due to her policies on climate change mitigation, and criticized her Republican opponent Donald Trump.

=== Philanthropy ===
In 1998, DiCaprio and his mother donated $35,000 for a "Leonardo DiCaprio Computer Center" at a library in Los Feliz. In May 2009, DiCaprio joined Kate Winslet, director James Cameron and Canadian singer Celine Dion, in a campaign to raise money to financially support the fees of the nursing home where Millvina Dean, a survivor of the RMS Titanic, was residing. DiCaprio and Winslet donated $20,000 to support Dean. In 2010, he donated $1 million to relief efforts in Haiti after the earthquake. In 2011, DiCaprio joined the Animal Legal Defense Fund's campaign to release Tony, a tiger that had spent the last decade at a truck stop in Grosse Tête, Louisiana. DiCaprio donated $61,000 to the gay rights group GLAAD in 2013.

In 2016, DiCaprio donated $65,000 to the annual fundraising gala for the Children of Armenia Fund, where he was a special guest of his friend and honorary chair, Tony Shafrazi. Supporting Hurricane Harvey (2017) relief efforts, DiCaprio provided $1 million through his foundation. In 2020, DiCaprio's foundation donated $3 million to Australia bushfire relief efforts. Amidst the 2022 Russian invasion of Ukraine, the media announced DiCaprio donated $10 million to support Ukraine, (Note: DiCaprio donated to humanitarian groups, including CARE, International Rescue Committee, the United Nations' High Commissioner for Refugees and Save the Children.) although the news agency Associated Press suggested this amount was inaccurate.

=== Motorsport ===
In line with his ongoing environmental activism, DiCaprio has been involved with the FIA Formula E World Championship since its inception. In December 2013, DiCaprio became a co-founder of the Venturi Racing team alongside Monegasque businessman Gildo Pallanca Pastor. Venturi were one of the ten Formula E founding teams, making their debut in the inaugural 2014–15 Formula E Championship. They recorded their first race victory with driver Edoardo Mortara at the 2019 Hong Kong ePrix, winning eight races in total and recording a best championship finish of second place in 2021–22 before being taken over by Stellantis and becoming Maserati MSG Racing ahead of the 2022–23 season.

In October 2015, DiCaprio was named as the chairman of the Formula E Sustainability Committee by then-Formula E chief executive officer Alejandro Agag. The committee aims to "focus on urban mobility and [promote] the mass use of electric vehicles". Ahead of the 2018 Marrakesh ePrix, DiCaprio drove one of the Spark-Renault SRT01-e cars used in the series around the Circuit International Automobile Moulay El Hassan.

DiCaprio produced the feature-length documentary And We Go Green, which followed the events of the 2017–18 Formula E Championship and provided access behind the scenes; it was released in May 2019.

== Personal life ==
I'm not an atheist, I'm agnostic. What I honestly think about is the planet, not my specific spiritual soul floating around. I know that sounds slightly eco-boy, but I think about the idea that there's going to be a mass extinction, and then something else is going to evolve.

— DiCaprio on his spiritual beliefs

DiCaprio's personal life is the subject of widespread media attention, though he rarely grants interviews and is reluctant to discuss his private life. Since his 40s, DiCaprio has been the focus of various reports detailing his involvement with women aged 25 or younger, and has faced criticism for the age disparity of those relationships. (Note: These criticisms include a reference in Taylor Swift's song "The Man", as well as jokes made by hosts of the Golden Globe Awards in 2014, in 2020 and in 2026, as well as at the 94th Academy Awards.) (Note: In 2019, Camila Morrone addressed the criticism as follows: "There's so many relationships in Hollywood – and in the history of the world – where people have large age gaps [...] I just think anyone should be able to date who they want to date".) In 1999, DiCaprio met Brazilian model Gisele Bündchen, whom he dated until 2005. He was romantically involved with Israeli model Bar Refaeli from 2005 to 2011. He later dated German fashion model Toni Garrn from 2013 to 2014 and later in 2017. DiCaprio was briefly romantically linked with Barbadian singer Rihanna, with the pair attending Coachella together in 2016. DiCaprio successfully sued French tabloid Oops after it made claims that DiCaprio had gotten Rihanna pregnant. DiCaprio was in a relationship with American model and actress Camila Morrone from 2017 until 2022. He has been dating Italian model Vittoria Ceretti since August 2023.

DiCaprio owns houses in Los Angeles and apartments in New York City. In 2009, he bought an island, Blackadore Caye, off mainland Belize—on which he is set to open an environmentally friendly resort—and in 2014, he purchased the original Dinah Shore residence designed by architect Donald Wexler in Palm Springs, California. In 2010, he stated he was agnostic.

In 2005, DiCaprio's face was severely injured when model Aretha Wilson hit him over the head with a broken bottle at a Hollywood party. As a result, he required seventeen stitches to his face and neck. Wilson pleaded no contest to the assault and was sentenced in 2010 to two years in prison. In 2017, when The Wolf of Wall Street producer Red Granite Pictures was involved in the 1Malaysia Development Berhad scandal, DiCaprio turned over the gifts he received from business associates at the production company, including from fugitive businessman Jho Low, to the US government. These included a Best Actor Oscar trophy won by Marlon Brando, a $3.2 million Pablo Picasso painting, and a $9 million Jean-Michel Basquiat collage.

== Filmography and accolades ==
According to the online portal Box Office Mojo and the review aggregate site Rotten Tomatoes, DiCaprio's most critically and commercially successful films include What's Eating Gilbert Grape (1993), Romeo + Juliet (1996), Titanic (1997), The Man In The Iron Mask (1998), Catch Me If You Can (2002), Gangs of New York (2002), The Aviator (2004), The Departed (2006), Blood Diamond (2006), Revolutionary Road (2008), Shutter Island (2010), Inception (2010), Django Unchained (2012), The Great Gatsby (2013), The Wolf of Wall Street (2013), The Revenant (2015), Once Upon a Time in Hollywood (2019), Don't Look Up (2021), Killers of the Flower Moon (2023), and One Battle After Another (2025). His films have grossed $7.2 billion worldwide.

DiCaprio has been recognized with seven nominations, including one win, by the Academy of Motion Picture Arts and Sciences for the following:

- 66th Academy Awards (1994): Best Supporting Actor, nomination, for What's Eating Gilbert Grape
- 77th Academy Awards (2005): Best Actor, nomination, for The Aviator
- 79th Academy Awards (2007): Best Actor, nomination, for Blood Diamond
- 86th Academy Awards (2014): Best Picture and Best Actor, nominations, for The Wolf of Wall Street
- 88th Academy Awards (2016): Best Actor, win, for The Revenant
- 92nd Academy Awards (2020): Best Actor, nomination, for Once Upon a Time in Hollywood
- 98th Academy Awards (2026): Best Actor, nomination, for One Battle After Another

DiCaprio has won three Golden Globe Awards: Best Actor in a Motion Picture – Drama for The Aviator and The Revenant and Best Actor in a Motion Picture – Musical or Comedy for The Wolf of Wall Street, as well as an Actor Award and a BAFTA Award for Best Actor for The Revenant.

== See also ==
- List of actors with Academy Award nominations
- List of actors with more than one Academy Award nomination in the acting categories
- List of actors nominated for Academy Awards for non-English performances
- List of Golden Globe winners
- List of oldest and youngest Academy Award winners and nominees – Youngest nominees for Best Supporting Actor
- Species named after DiCaprio
  - Grouvellinus leonardodicaprioi – Species of beetle
  - Spintharus leonardodicaprioi – Species of spider

== Cited sources ==
- Block, Alex Ben; Wilson, Lucy Autrey, eds. (2010). George Lucas's Blockbusting: A Decade-By-Decade Survey of Timeless Movies Including Untold Secrets of Their Financial and Cultural Success. HarperCollins. p. 714. ISBN 978-0-061-77889-6.
- Erdős, László (2019). "Greening Hollywood – the Activism of Leonardo DiCaprio". Green Heroes. Springer Science+Business Media. pp. 217–221. doi:10.1007/978-3-030-31806-2_43. ISBN 978-3-030-31805-5. S2CID 213723782.
- Hammond, Michael K. (2012). "Leonardo DiCaprio and Sean Penn: Acting Authentic". In Pomerance, Murray (ed.). Shining in Shadows: Movie Stars of the 2000s. Rutgers University Press. pp. 166–181. ISBN 978-0-81355-216-3.
- Mooney, William H. (2021). "Citizen Kane (1941) and Baz Luhrmann's the Great Gatsby (2013)". Adaptation and the New Art Film. Palgrave Studies in Adaptation and Visual Culture. Palgrave Macmillan. pp. 237–268. doi:10.1007/978-3-030-62934-2_9. ISBN 978-3-030-62933-5. S2CID 238014709.
- Muir, John Kenneth (2004). The Unseen Force: The Films of Sam Raimi. Applause: Theatre & Cinema Books. ISBN 978-1-55783-607-6.
- Müller, Jürgen (2001). Movies of the 90s. Taschen. ISBN 978-3-8228-5878-3.
- Nash, Melanie; Lahti, Marti (1999). "The Paradoxes of Girls' Fandom". In Sandler, Kevin S.; Studlar, Gaylyn (eds.). Titanic: Anatomy of a Blockbuster. Rutgers University Press. pp. 64–88. ISBN 978-0-8135-2669-0.
- Neibaur, James L. (2016). The Essential Jack Nicholson. Rowman & Littlefield. ISBN 978-1-4422-6989-7.
- Ochoa, George (2011). Deformed and Destructive Beings: The Purpose of Horror Films. McFarland & Company. ISBN 978-0-7864-8654-0.
- Pomerance, Murray (2012). "Leonardo DiCaprio: King of the 'World'". In Everett, Anna (ed.). Pretty People: Movie Stars of the 1990s. Rutgers University Press. pp. 103–122. doi:10.36019/9780813553252-007. ISBN 9780813553252. S2CID 225038492.
- Romney, Jonathan (2014). "The Man Who Sold the World". Film Comment. 50 (1): 22–27. JSTOR 43459881.
- Schwartz, David; Ryan, Steve; Wostbrock, Fred (1999). The Encyclopedia of TV Game Shows (3rd ed.). Checkmark Books. ISBN 978-0-8160-3847-3.
- Todd, Erica (2014). Passionate Love and Popular Cinema. Palgrave Macmillan. doi:10.1057/9781137295385. ISBN 978-1-349-45183-8.
- Wight, Douglas (2012). Leonardo DiCaprio: The Biography. John Blake Publishing Ltd. ISBN 978-1-78219-859-8.
