= List of awards and nominations received by Leonardo DiCaprio =

Leonardo DiCaprio awards and nominations
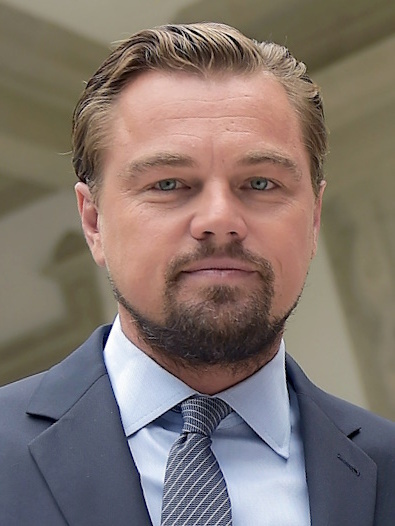
- DiCaprio in 2017
Awards and nominations
Award	Wins	Nominations
Academy Awards	1	8
Actor Awards	1	15
BAFTA Awards	1	7
Critics' Choice Awards	2	15
Emmy Awards	1	2
Golden Globes	3	15

Totals (Note: Certain award groups do not simply award one winner. They acknowledge several different recipients, have runners-up, and have third place. Since this is a specific recognition and is different from losing an award, runner-up mentions are considered wins in this award tally. For simplification and to avoid errors, each award in this list has been presumed to have had a prior nomination.)
- Wins: 124
- Nominations: 354

DiCaprio received three Young Artist Award nominations for his roles in television shows during the early 1990s—the soap opera Santa Barbara (1990), the dramedy Parenthood (1990) and the sitcom Growing Pains (1991). This was followed by his film debut in the direct-to-video feature Critters 3 (1991). He played a mentally challenged boy in the drama What's Eating Gilbert Grape (1993), a role that earned him nominations for the Academy Award and Golden Globe Award for Best Supporting Actor. Three years later, he appeared in Romeo + Juliet, for which he earned a Best Actor award from the Berlin International Film Festival. DiCaprio featured opposite Kate Winslet in the romantic drama Titanic (1997), the highest-grossing film to that point. For the film, he garnered the MTV Movie Award for Best Male Performance and his first Golden Globe Award for Best Actor nomination. For a role in The Beach, he was nominated for two Teen Choice Awards (Choice Actor and Choice Chemistry) but also a Golden Raspberry Award for Worst Actor. DiCaprio was cast in the role of con-artist Frank Abagnale, Jr. in the crime drama Catch Me If You Can, and starred in the historical drama Gangs of New York—films that earned him two nominations at the 2003 MTV Movie Awards.

DiCaprio received his first Lead Actor nominations for his first Academy Award, BAFTA Award, and Critics' Choice Award for his portrayal of Howard Hughes in the biographical drama The Aviator (2004); he won a Golden Globe Award in the same category. For his next appearances—the crime drama The Departed (2006), the war thriller Blood Diamond (2006), the drama Revolutionary Road (2008) and the biographical drama J. Edgar (2011)—he garnered nominations for the Golden Globe Award for Best Actor in a Motion Picture – Drama. DiCaprio earned nominations for the Saturn Award for Best Actor for his roles in the psychological thriller Shutter Island (2010) and the science fiction thriller Inception (2010). He co-produced and played stockbroker Jordan Belfort in The Wolf of Wall Street (2013), a role that earned him the Golden Globe Award for Best Actor in a Motion Picture – Musical or Comedy as well as Oscar and BAFTA nominations. DiCaprio was also nominated for his first and, to date, only Academy Award for Best Picture. He won the Golden Globe Award, BAFTA Award, and Academy Award for Best Actor for his portrayal of Hugh Glass in the 2015 film The Revenant. For playing an aging television actor in the comedy-drama Once Upon a Time in Hollywood (2019), he received Lead Actor nominations for an Oscar, a BAFTA, a SAG, a Critics' Choice, and a Golden Globe. For his performance as a former revolutionary on a journey to save his daughter in One Battle After Another, he received his sixth Best Actor Oscar nomination.

== Major associations ==
=== Academy Awards ===
Year	Category	Nominated work	Result	Ref.
1994	Best Supporting Actor	What's Eating Gilbert Grape	Nominated	
2005	Best Actor	The Aviator	Nominated	
2007	Best Actor	Blood Diamond	Nominated	
2014	Best Picture	The Wolf of Wall Street	Nominated	
2014	Best Actor	The Wolf of Wall Street	Nominated	
2016	Best Actor	The Revenant	Won	
2020	Best Actor	Once Upon a Time in Hollywood	Nominated	
2026	Best Actor	One Battle After Another	Nominated	

=== Actor Awards ===
Year	Category	Nominated work	Result	Ref.
1997	Outstanding Cast in a Motion Picture	Marvin's Room	Nominated (Note: Shared with the cast)	
1998	Outstanding Cast in a Motion Picture	Titanic	Nominated	
2005	Outstanding Cast in a Motion Picture	The Aviator	Nominated	
2005	Outstanding Male Actor in a Leading Role	The Aviator	Nominated	
2007	Outstanding Male Actor in a Leading Role	Blood Diamond	Nominated	
2007	Outstanding Cast in a Motion Picture	The Departed	Nominated	
2007	Outstanding Male Actor in a Supporting Role	The Departed	Nominated	
2012	Outstanding Male Actor in a Leading Role	J. Edgar	Nominated	
2016	Outstanding Male Actor in a Leading Role	The Revenant	Won	
2020	Outstanding Male Actor in a Leading Role	Once Upon a Time in Hollywood	Nominated	
2020	Outstanding Cast in a Motion Picture	Once Upon a Time in Hollywood	Nominated	
2022	Outstanding Cast in a Motion Picture	Don't Look Up	Nominated	
2024	Outstanding Cast in a Motion Picture	Killers of the Flower Moon	Nominated	
2026	Outstanding Cast in a Motion Picture	One Battle After Another	Nominated	
2026	Outstanding Male Actor in a Leading Role	One Battle After Another	Nominated	

=== BAFTA Awards ===
Year	Category	Nominated work	Result	Ref.
British Academy Film Awards
2005	Best Actor in a Leading Role	The Aviator	Nominated	
2007	Best Actor in a Leading Role	The Departed	Nominated	
2014	Best Actor in a Leading Role	The Wolf of Wall Street	Nominated	
2016	Best Actor in a Leading Role	The Revenant	Won	
2020	Best Actor in a Leading Role	Once Upon a Time in Hollywood	Nominated	
2022	Best Actor in a Leading Role	Don't Look Up	Nominated	
2026	Best Actor in a Leading Role	One Battle After Another	Nominated	

=== Critics' Choice Awards ===
Year	Category	Nominated work	Result	Ref.
Critics' Choice Movie Awards
2005	Best Actor	The Aviator	Nominated	
2007	Best Actor	Blood Diamond	Nominated	
2007	Best Actor	The Departed	Nominated	
2007	Best Acting Ensemble	The Departed	Nominated	
2012	Best Actor	J. Edgar	Nominated	
2014	Best Actor in a Comedy	The Wolf of Wall Street	Won	
2016	Best Actor	The Revenant	Won	
2020	Best Actor	Once Upon a Time in Hollywood	Nominated	
2020	Best Acting Ensemble	Once Upon a Time in Hollywood	Nominated	
2022	Best Acting Ensemble	Don't Look Up	Nominated	
2024	Best Acting Ensemble	Killers of the Flower Moon	Nominated	
2024	Best Actor	Killers of the Flower Moon	Nominated	
2026	Best Actor	One Battle After Another	Nominated	

=== Emmy Awards ===
Year	Category	Nominated work	Result	Ref.
Primetime Emmy Awards
2014	Outstanding Documentary or Nonfiction Special	Virunga	Nominated (Note: Nominated as executive producer)	
News and Documentary Emmy Awards
2024	Outstanding Nature Documentary	Path of the Panther	Won	

=== Golden Globe Awards ===
Year	Category	Nominated work	Result	Ref.
1994	Best Supporting Actor – Motion Picture	What's Eating Gilbert Grape	Nominated	
1998	Best Actor in a Motion Picture – Drama	Titanic	Nominated	
2003	Best Actor in a Motion Picture – Drama	Catch Me If You Can	Nominated	
2005	Best Actor in a Motion Picture – Drama	The Aviator	Won	
2007	Best Actor in a Motion Picture – Drama	The Departed	Nominated	
2007	Best Actor in a Motion Picture – Drama	Blood Diamond	Nominated	
2009	Best Actor in a Motion Picture – Drama	Revolutionary Road	Nominated	
2012	Best Actor in a Motion Picture – Drama	J. Edgar	Nominated	
2013	Best Supporting Actor – Motion Picture	Django Unchained	Nominated	
2014	Best Actor in a Motion Picture – Musical or Comedy	The Wolf of Wall Street	Won	
2016	Best Actor in a Motion Picture – Drama	The Revenant	Won	
2020	Best Actor in a Motion Picture – Musical or Comedy	Once Upon a Time in Hollywood	Nominated	
2022	Best Actor in a Motion Picture – Musical or Comedy	Don't Look Up	Nominated	
2024	Best Actor in a Motion Picture – Drama	Killers of the Flower Moon	Nominated	
2026	Best Actor in a Motion Picture – Musical or Comedy	One Battle After Another	Nominated	

== Other associations ==
Organizations (Note: Awards, festivals, honors and other miscellaneous organizations are listed in alphabetical order.)	Year (Note: Year in which award ceremony was held.)	Category	Work	Result	Ref.
Alliance of Women Film Journalists	2010	Unforgettable Moment	Inception	Nominated (Note: Shared with Elliot Page)	
Alliance of Women Film Journalists	2016	Best Actor	The Revenant	Won	
Austin Film Critics Association Awards	2007	Best Performance by an Actor in a Leading Role	The Departed	Won	
Austin Film Critics Association Awards	2016	Best Performance by an Actor in a Leading Role	The Revenant	Nominated	
Australian Academy of Cinema and Television Arts Awards	2011	Best International Lead Actor – Cinema	J. Edgar	Nominated	
Australian Academy of Cinema and Television Arts Awards	2013	Best International Lead Actor – Cinema	The Wolf of Wall Street	Nominated	
Australian Academy of Cinema and Television Arts Awards	2013	Best Lead Actor – Cinema	The Great Gatsby	Won	
Australian Academy of Cinema and Television Arts Awards	2016	Best International Lead Actor – Cinema	The Revenant	Won	
Australian Film Critics Association	2014	Best Actor	The Great Gatsby	Nominated	
Berlin Film Festival	1997	Silver Bear Award for Best Actor	Romeo + Juliet	Won	
Blockbuster Entertainment Awards	1997	Favorite Actor – Romance	Romeo + Juliet	Won	
Blockbuster Entertainment Awards	1998	Favorite Actor – Drama	Titanic	Won	
Boston Society of Film Critics	2006	Best Ensemble Cast	The Departed	Runner-up	
Boston Society of Film Critics	2013	Best Actor	The Wolf of Wall Street	Runner-up	
Boston Society of Film Critics	2015	Best Actor	The Revenant	Won	
Capri Hollywood International Film Festival	2019	Best Ensemble Cast	Once Upon a Time in Hollywood	Won	
Capri Hollywood International Film Festival	2025	Best Actor	One Battle After Another	Won	
Chicago Film Critics Association	1993	Best Emerging Actor	What's Eating Gilbert Grape?	Won	
Chicago Film Critics Association	2006	Best Actor	The Departed	Nominated	
Chicago Film Critics Association	2012	Best Supporting Actor	Django Unchained	Nominated	
Chicago Film Critics Association	2015	Best Actor	The Revenant	Won	
Chicago Film Critics Association	2023	Best Actor	Killers of the Flower Moon	Nominated	
Dallas–Fort Worth Film Critics Association	2004	Best Actor	The Aviator	Nominated	
Dallas–Fort Worth Film Critics Association	2006	Best Actor	The Departed	Nominated	
Dallas–Fort Worth Film Critics Association	2006	Best Actor	Blood Diamond	Nominated	
Dallas–Fort Worth Film Critics Association	2013	Best Actor	The Wolf of Wall Street	Nominated	
Dallas–Fort Worth Film Critics Association	2015	Best Actor	The Revenant	Won	
Dallas–Fort Worth Film Critics Association	2019	Best Actor	Once Upon a Time in Hollywood	Nominated	
Dallas–Fort Worth Film Critics Association	2023	Best Actor	Killers of the Flower Moon	Nominated	
Detroit Film Critics Society	2008	Best Actor	Revolutionary Road	Nominated	
Detroit Film Critics Society	2013	Best Actor	The Wolf of Wall Street	Nominated	
Detroit Film Critics Society	2015	Best Actor	The Revenant	Nominated	
Detroit Film Critics Society	2019	Best Ensemble	Once Upon a Time in Hollywood	Won	
Dorian Awards	2012	Film Performance of the Year—Actor	J. Edgar	Nominated	
Dorian Awards	2014	Film Performance of the Year—Actor	The Wolf of Wall Street	Nominated	
Dorian Awards	2015	Film Performance of the Year—Actor	The Revenant	Won	
Dublin Film Critics' Circle	2006	Best Actor	The Departed	Won	
Dublin Film Critics' Circle	2013	Best Actor	The Wolf of Wall Street	Nominated	
Empire Awards	2007	Best Actor	The Departed	Nominated	
Empire Awards	2011	Best Actor	Inception	Nominated	
Empire Awards	2014	Best Actor	The Wolf of Wall Street	Nominated	
Empire Awards	2016	Best Actor	The Revenant	Nominated	
Film Critics Circle of Australia	2013	Best Actor	The Great Gatsby	Nominated	
Golden Raspberry Awards	1999	Worst Screen Couple	The Man in the Iron Mask	Won	
Golden Raspberry Awards	2001	Worst Actor	The Beach	Nominated	
Golden Raspberry Awards	2019	Worst Picture	Robin Hood	Nominated	
Hollywood Critics Association Awards	2020	Best Cast	Once Upon a Time in Hollywood	Nominated	
Hollywood Critics Association Awards	2020	Best Leading Actor	Once Upon a Time in Hollywood	Nominated	
Hollywood Critics Association Awards	2022	Best Cast	Don't Look Up	Nominated	
Hollywood Critics Association Awards	2024	Best Cast	Killers of the Flower Moon	Nominated	
Hollywood Film Awards	2004	Best Actor of the Year	The Aviator	Won	
Irish Film & Television Academy	2007	Best International Actor	The Departed	Won	
Irish Film & Television Academy	2011	Best International Actor	Inception	Nominated	
Irish Film & Television Academy	2012	Best International Actor	J. Edgar	Nominated	
Irish Film & Television Academy	2014	Best International Actor	The Wolf of Wall Street	Nominated	
Irish Film & Television Academy	2016	Best International Actor	The Revenant	Won	
Irish Film & Television Academy	2024	Best International Actor	Killers of the Flower Moon	Nominated	
London Film Critics Circle	2005	Actor of the Year	The Aviator	Nominated	
London Film Critics Circle	2014	Actor of the Year	The Wolf of Wall Street	Nominated	
London Film Critics Circle	2016	Actor of the Year	The Revenant	Nominated	
Los Angeles Film Critics Association	1993	New Generation Award	This Boy's Life and What's Eating Gilbert Grape	Won	
MTV Movie & TV Awards	1997	Best Kiss in a Movie	Romeo + Juliet	Nominated (Note: Shared with Claire Danes.)	
MTV Movie & TV Awards	1997	Best On-Screen Duo or Team in a Movie	Romeo + Juliet	Nominated	
MTV Movie & TV Awards	1997	Best Performance in a Movie	Romeo + Juliet	Nominated	
MTV Movie & TV Awards	1998	Best Kiss in a Movie	Titanic	Nominated (Note: Shared with Kate Winslet.)	
MTV Movie & TV Awards	1998	Best Performance in a Movie	Titanic	Won	
MTV Movie & TV Awards	1998	Best On-Screen Duo or Team in a Movie	Titanic	Nominated	
MTV Movie & TV Awards	2003	Best Kiss (Note: Shared with Cameron Diaz)	Gangs of New York	Nominated	
MTV Movie & TV Awards	2003	Best Performance in a Movie	Catch Me If You Can	Nominated	
MTV Movie & TV Awards	2005	Best Performance in a Movie	The Aviator	Won	
MTV Movie & TV Awards	2011	Best Jaw Dropping Moment in a Movie	Inception	Nominated	
MTV Movie & TV Awards	2013	Best Villain in a Movie	Django Unchained	Nominated	
MTV Movie & TV Awards	2013	Best On-Screen Duo or Team in a Movie (Note: Shared with Samuel L. Jackson)	Django Unchained	Nominated	
MTV Movie & TV Awards	2014	Best WTF Moment in a Movie	The Wolf of Wall Street	Won	
MTV Movie & TV Awards	2016	Best Performance in a Movie	The Revenant	Won	
MTV Movie & TV Awards	2016	Best Fight in a Movie (Note: Hugh Glass (Leonardo DiCaprio) vs. The Bear)	The Revenant	Nominated	
National Board of Review of Motion Pictures Awards	1994	Best Supporting Actor	What's Eating Gilbert Grape	Won	
National Board of Review of Motion Pictures Awards	2007	Best Cast	The Departed	Won	
National Board of Review of Motion Pictures Awards	2013	Best Supporting Actor	Django Unchained	Won	
National Board of Review of Motion Pictures Awards	2014	Career Collaboration Award	Leonardo DiCaprio	Won (Note: Shared with Martin Scorsese)	
National Board of Review of Motion Pictures Awards	2026	Best Actor	One Battle After Another	Won	
National Society of Film Critics	1994	Best Supporting Actor	What's Eating Gilbert Grape	Runner-up	
New York Film Critics Circle	1994	Best Supporting Actor	What's Eating Gilbert Grape	Runner-up	
Nickelodeon Kids' Choice Awards	2009	Big Green Help Award	Leonardo DiCaprio	Won	
Online Film Critics Society Awards	2005	Best Lead Actor	The Aviator	Nominated	
Online Film Critics Society Awards	2007	Best Lead Actor	The Departed	Nominated	
Online Film Critics Society Awards	2015	Best Lead Actor	The Revenant	Nominated	
Palm Springs International Film Festival	2009	Best Ensemble Cast	Revolutionary Road	Won	
Palm Springs International Film Festival	2024	Vanguard Award	Killers of the Flower Moon	Awarded (Note: Shared with the cast and crew)	
Palm Springs International Film Festival	2026	Desert Palm Achievement for Best Actor	One Battle After Another	Honoured	
People's Choice Awards	2007	Favorite On-Screen Match-Up	The Departed	Nominated (Note: Shared with Matt Damon and Jack Nicholson)	
People's Choice Awards	2007	Favorite Star Under 35	Leonardo DiCaprio	Nominated	
People's Choice Awards	2011	Favorite On-Screen Team	Inception	Nominated (Note: Shared with Tom Hardy, Elliot Page, Dileep Rao, and Joseph Gordon-Levitt)	
People's Choice Awards	2011	Favorite Movie Actor	Inception	Nominated	
People's Choice Awards	2014	Favorite Dramatic Movie Actor	The Great Gatsby	Won	
People's Choice Awards	2014	Favorite Movie Actor	The Great Gatsby	Nominated	
People's Choice Awards	2019	Favorite Drama Movie Star	Once Upon a Time in Hollywood	Nominated	
People's Choice Awards	2024	Drama Movie Star of the Year	Killers of the Flower Moon	Nominated	
People's Choice Awards	2024	Male Movie Star of the Year	Killers of the Flower Moon	Nominated	
Rembrandt Awards	2014	Beste Buitenlandse Acteur	The Great Gatsby	Won	
San Diego Film Critics Society	2012	Best Performance by an Ensemble Cast	Django Unchained	Nominated	
San Diego Film Critics Society	2015	Best Performance by an Actor	The Revenant	Won	
San Diego Film Critics Society	2019	Best Performance by an Ensemble Cast	Once Upon a Time in Hollywood	Nominated	
San Diego Film Critics Society	2021	Best Performance by an Ensemble Cast	Don't Look Up	Won	
San Diego Film Critics Society	2021	Best Comedic Performance	Don't Look Up	Nominated	
Santa Barbara International Film Festival	2013	American Riviera Award	Leonardo DiCaprio	Won	
Santa Barbara International Film Festival	2014	Cinema Vanguard Award	Leonardo DiCaprio	Won	
Santa Barbara International Film Festival	2026	Hammond Cinema Vanguard Award (renamed)	One Battle After Another	Won (Note: Shared with Benicio del Toro and Sean Penn)	
Satellite Awards	1998	Best Actor in a Film	Titanic	Nominated	
Satellite Awards	2006	Best Actor in a Film	Blood Diamond	Nominated	
Satellite Awards	2006	Best Supporting Actor in a Film	The Departed	Won	
Satellite Awards	2006	Best Cast in a Film	The Departed	Won	
Satellite Awards	2008	Best Actor in a Film	Revolutionary Road	Nominated	
Satellite Awards	2010	Best Actor in a Film	Inception	Nominated	
Satellite Awards	2011	Best Actor in a Film	J. Edgar	Nominated	
Satellite Awards	2014	Best Actor in a Film	The Wolf of Wall Street	Nominated	
Satellite Awards	2016	Best Actor in a Film	The Revenant	Won	
Satellite Awards	2020	Best Actor in a Film	Once Upon a Time in Hollywood	Nominated	
Satellite Awards	2024	Best Actor in a Film	Killers of the Flower Moon	Nominated	
Saturn Awards	2011	Best Film Actor	Shutter Island	Nominated	
Saturn Awards	2011	Best Film Actor	Inception	Nominated	
Saturn Awards	2015	Best Film Actor	The Revenant	Nominated	
Scream Awards	2010	Best Actor in a Science Fiction Movie	Inception	Won	
Scream Awards	2010	Best Actor in a Horror Movie	Shutter Island	Nominated	
Seattle Film Critics Society	2025	Best Actor in a Leading Role	One Battle After Another	Won	
St. Louis Gateway Film Critics Association	2007	Best Actor	The Departed	Nominated	
St. Louis Gateway Film Critics Association	2007	Best Actor	Blood Diamond	Nominated	
St. Louis Gateway Film Critics Association	2008	Best Actor	Revolutionary Road	Nominated	
St. Louis Gateway Film Critics Association	2015	Best Actor	The Revenant	Won	
St. Louis Gateway Film Critics Association	2023	Best Actor	Killers of the Flower Moon	Nominated	
St. Louis Gateway Film Critics Association	2023	Best Enemble	Killers of the Flower Moon	Nominated	
Teen Choice Awards	1999	Film – Choice Hissy Fit	Celebrity	Nominated	
Teen Choice Awards	2000	Film – Choice Actor	The Beach	Nominated	
Teen Choice Awards	2000	Film – Choice Chemistry	The Beach	Nominated (Note: Shared with Virginie Ledoyen)	
Teen Choice Awards	2003	Choice Movie Liplock	Gangs of New York	Nominated (Note: Shared with Cameron Diaz)	
Teen Choice Awards	2003	Choice Movie Liar	Catch Me If You Can	Won	
Teen Choice Awards	2005	Choice Movie Actor: Drama	The Aviator	Nominated	
Teen Choice Awards	2007	Choice Movie Actor: Drama	The Departed and Blood Diamond	Nominated	
Teen Choice Awards	2010	Choice Movie Actor: Horror/Thriller	Shutter Island	Won	
Teen Choice Awards	2013	Choice Movie Actor: Drama	The Great Gatsby	Nominated	
Teen Choice Awards	2016	Choice Movie Actor: Drama	The Revenant	Won	
Vancouver Film Critics Circle	2006	Best Performance by a Lead Actor	The Departed	Nominated	
Vancouver Film Critics Circle	2015	Best Performance by a Lead Actor	The Revenant	Nominated	
Visual Effects Society	2005	Outstanding Performance by an Actor or Actress in a Visual Effects Film	The Aviator	Nominated	
Washington D.C. Area Film Critics Association	2004	Best Actor	The Aviator	Nominated	
Washington D.C. Area Film Critics Association	2008	Best Ensemble	Revolutionary Road	Nominated	
Washington D.C. Area Film Critics Association	2012	Best Supporting Actor	Django Unchained	Nominated	
Washington D.C. Area Film Critics Association	2013	Best Actor	The Wolf of Wall Street	Nominated	
Washington D.C. Area Film Critics Association	2015	Best Actor	The Revenant	Won	
Washington D.C. Area Film Critics Association	2019	Best Actor	Once Upon a Time in Hollywood	Nominated	
Washington D.C. Area Film Critics Association	2019	Best Ensemble	Once Upon a Time in Hollywood	Nominated	
Washington D.C. Area Film Critics Association	2023	Best Ensemble	Killers of the Flower Moon	Nominated	
Young Artist Awards	1991	Best Young Actor in a Daytime Series	Santa Barbara	Nominated	
Young Artist Awards	1991	Best Young Actor Starring in a New Television Series	Parenthood	Nominated	
Young Artist Awards	1992	Best Young Actor Co-starring in a Television Series	Growing Pains	Nominated	

== See also ==
- List of oldest and youngest Academy Award winners and nominees – Youngest nominees for Best Actor in a Supporting Role
- List of actors with Academy Award nominations
- List of actors with two or more Academy Awards nominations in acting categories
- List of Golden Globe winners
- Leonardo DiCaprio filmography
