= Fin (2021 film) =

- Promotional release poster
- Directed by: Eli Roth
- Produced by: Craig Piligian; Gretchen Stockdale; Nicholas Caprio; Mohamed El Manasterly
- Cinematography: Doug Glover
- Edited by: Mohamed El Manasterly; John MacDonnell
- Music by: Nathan Barr
- Production companies: Lionsgate; Pilgrim Media Group; Appian Way Productions
- Distributed by: Discovery+
- Release date: July 13, 2021
- Running time: 100 minutes
- Country: United States
- Language: English

Fin is a 2021 American documentary film directed by Eli Roth. It follows Roth and a group of scientists, activists, and researchers who travel around the world exposing the extinction of sharks. Leonardo DiCaprio and Nina Dobrev serve as executive producers, with Lionsgate, Pilgrim Media Group and Appian Way Productions producing and Discovery+ distributing.

The film was released on July 13, 2021, by Discovery+.
