= Murray Pomerance =

Canadian film scholar (born 1946)

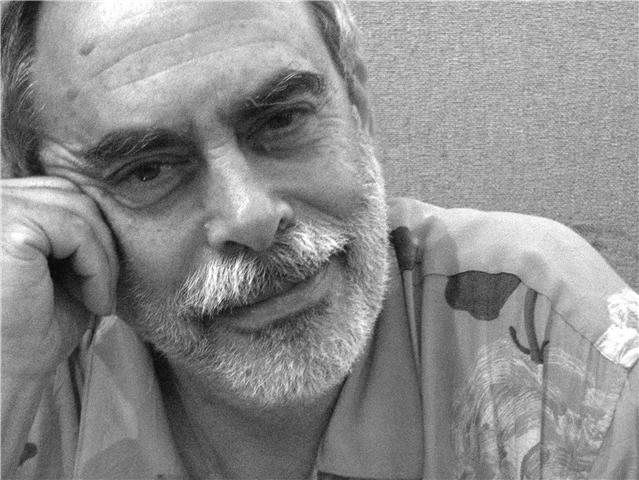
Murray Pomerance

Murray Pomerance is an independent Canadian film scholar and author living in Toronto, Ontario, Canada, and adjunct professor in the School of Media and Communication at RMIT University in Melbourne, Australia.

== Career ==
Pomerance was born in 1946 in Hamilton, Ontario and studied at the University of Toronto, the University of Michigan (with Kenneth Boulding and Theodore Newcomb), the New School for Social Research (with Benjamin Nelson), the State University of New York at Buffalo (with Edgar Z. Friedenberg and Warren Bennis), and York University.

Pomerance has written extensively on film, cinematic experience, and performance, and has also edited and co-edited more than two dozen anthologies exploring cinema. He contributes regularly to print and online publications, including Film International, Senses of Cinema and FLOW. In addition, Pomerance is editor of the “Techniques of the Moving Image” series at Rutgers University Press and the “Horizons of Cinema” series at State University of New York Press and, with Lester D. Friedman and Adrienne L. McLean respectively, co-editor of both the “Screen Decades” and “Star Decades” series at Rutgers University Press.

His book Johnny Depp Starts Here has been translated into the French as Ici Commence Johnny Depp (tr. Pauline Soulat; Éditions Capricci 2010), and into the German as Johnny Depp: Betrachtungen zu einem Schauspieler (tr. Andrea Rennschmid; Reinhard Weber Verlag 2006).

Pomerance also writes fiction, and is a 1992 O. Henry Award winner. His work has appeared in New Directions, The Paris Review, The Kenyon Review, The Boston Review, Chelsea, Confrontation, and Descant. He is the author, as well, of Ludwig Bemelmans: A Bibliography (Heineman, 1993).

In the spring of 1986, Pomerance authored "Invaders from Zon," the first work of fiction published in electricity.

He was diagnosed with autism in the spring of 2018.

Pomerance has also been involved in film production, appearing in Brandon Cronenberg's Broken Tulips (2008), and acting, writing, and composing for R. Bruce Elder’s Lamentations: A Monument to the Dead World (1985). In the summer of 2009, he appeared on Broadway in conjunction with a performance of The 39 Steps. In August 2013, his co-authored commentary (with R. Barton Palmer) appeared on the Criterion DVD of John Frankenheimer's Seconds. In October 2017 he appeared on BBC Radio 3's "Free Thinking."

== Works published ==
- Light Thoughts: Image, Reverie, Memory (Bloomsbury 2026)
- Edge of the Screen (Bloomsbury 2024)
- An Eye for Hitchcock, revised edition (SUNY Press 2024)
- The Biggest Thing in Show Business: Living It Up with Martin & Lewis (with Matthew Solomon) (SUNY Press 2024)
- A Silence from Hitchcock (SUNY Press 2023)
- Uncanny Cinema: Agonies of the Viewing Experience (Bloomsbury 2022)
- Color It True: Impressions of Cinema (Bloomsbury 2022)
- A Voyage with Hitchcock (State University of New York Press 2021)
- The Film Cheat: Screen Artifice and Viewing Pleasure (Bloomsbury 2020)
- Virtuoso: Film Performance and the Actor's Magic (Bloomsbury 2019)
- A Dream of Hitchcock (SUNY Press 2019)
- Cinema, If You Please: The Taste of Memory, the Memory of Taste (Edinburgh University Press 2018)
- Moment of Action: Riddles of Cinematic Performance (Rutgers 2016)
- The Man Who Knew Too Much (BFI 2016)
- Marnie (BFI 2014)
- The Eyes Have It: Cinema and the Reality Effect (Rutgers 2013)
- Alfred Hitchcock's America (Polity Press 2013)
- Michelangelo Red Antonioni Blue: Eight Reflections on Cinema (University of California Press 2011)
- The Horse Who Drank the Sky: Film Experience Beyond Narrative and Theory (Rutgers University Press 2008)
- Johnny Depp Starts Here (Rutgers 2005)
- An Eye for Hitchcock (Rutgers 2004)

=== Edited ===
- "The Color of Our Eyes," special issue of The New Review of Film and Television Studies, February 2017
- The Last Laugh: Strange Humors of Cinema (Wayne State, 2013)
- Shining in Shadows: Movie Stars of the 2000s (Rutgers 2012)
- A Family Affair: Cinema Calls Home (Wallflower 2008)
- City That Never Sleeps: New York and the Filmic Imagination (Rutgers 2007)
- Cinema and Modernity (Rutgers 2006)
- American Cinema of the 1950s: Themes and Variations (Rutgers 2005)
- BAD: Infamy, Darkness, Evil, and Slime on Screen (State University of New York Press 2004)
- Enfant Terrible! Jerry Lewis in American Film (New York University Press 2002)
- Ladies and Gentlemen, Boys and Girls: Gender in Film at the End of the Twentieth Century (State University of New York Press 2001)

=== Co-edited ===
- Mervyn Leroy Comes to Town (with R. Barton Palmer; Rutgers University Press, 2025)
- Autism in Film and Television: On the Island (with R. Barton Palmer; University of Texas Press, 2022)
- The Other Hollywood Renaissance (with Dominic Lennard, and R. Barton Palmer; Edinburgh University Press, 2020)
- The Many Cinemas of Michael Curtiz (with R. Barton Palmer; University of Texas Press, 2018)
- Close-Up: Great Cinematic Performances Vol. 1, America (with Kyle Stevens; Edinburgh University Press, 2017)
- Close-Up: Great Cinematic Performances Vol. 2, International (with Kyle Stevens; Edinburgh University Press, 2017)
- Hamlet Lives in Hollywood: John Barrymore and the Acting Tradition on Screen (with Steven Rybin; Edinburgh University Press 2017)
- Thinking in the Dark: Cinema, Theory, Practice (with R. Barton Palmer; Rutgers University Press 2016)
- George Cukor: Hollywood Master (with R. Barton Palmer; Edinburgh University Press 2015)
- Hollywood's Chosen People: The Jewish Experience in American Cinema (with Daniel Bernardi, and Hava Tirosh-Samuelson; Wayne State 2012)
- A Little Solitaire: John Frankenheimer and American Film (with R. Barton Palmer; Rutgers University Press 2011)
- From Hobbits to Hollywood: Essays on Peter Jackson’s Lord of the Rings (with Ernest Mathijs; Rodopi 2006)
- Where the Boys Are: Cinemas of Masculinity and Youth (with Frances Gateward; Wayne State 2005)
- Sugar, Spice, and Everything Nice: Cinemas of Girlhood (with Frances Gateward; Wayne State 2002)
- Popping Culture (with John Sakeris; 7 editions 2003–2012; Boston: Pearson)
- Closely Watched Brains (with John Sakeris; 2 editions 2001–2003; Boston: Pearson)
- Bang Bang Shoot Shoot! Essays on Guns and Popular Culture (with John Sakeris; 2 editions 1999–2000; Simon & Schuster, Pearson)
- Pictures of a Generation on Hold (with John Sakeris; MSWG)

=== Fiction ===
- Grammatical Dreams (Green Integer 2020)
- A King of Infinite Space (Oberon Press 2017)
- The Economist (Oberon Press 2014)
- Tomorrow (Oberon Press 2012)
- Edith Valmaine (Oberon Press 2010)
- Savage Time (Oberon Press 2005)
- Magia d’Amore (Sun and Moon 1999)
