= Gardener of Eden =

- Movie poster
- Directed by: Kevin Connolly
- Written by: Adam "Tex" Davis
- Produced by: Allen Bain; Leonardo DiCaprio; Brad Simpson
- Starring: Lukas Haas; Erika Christensen; Giovanni Ribisi
- Cinematography: Lisa Rinzler
- Edited by: Pete Beaudreau; Michael Berenbaum
- Music by: Paul Haslinger
- Production company: Appian Way
- Distributed by: Virtual Studios
- Release date: April 26, 2007 (Tribeca Film Festival)
- Running time: 88 minutes
- Country: United States
- Language: English

Gardener of Eden is a 2007 American comedy-drama film directed by Kevin Connolly. It stars Lukas Haas, Erika Christensen and Giovanni Ribisi.

The film premiered at the Tribeca Film Festival, and was Connolly's directorial debut. It was produced by his friend Leonardo DiCaprio.

== Plot ==
Adam Harris, a twenty-something college dropout, returns to his hometown, the fictional "Bickleton" in New Jersey, and moves back in with his parents. Lacking real direction in his life, Adam spends his time working at a local deli and hanging out with his equally unambitious friends. Adam soon finds himself unemployed and cut off by his friends.

Adam's life changes dramatically when he accidentally captures a serial rapist named Richard Pope who has just attacked a local girl, Mona Hukley. The new-found attention inspires him to become a vigilante.

== Cast ==
- Lukas Haas as Adam Harris
- Erika Christensen as Mona Huxley
- Giovanni Ribisi as Vic
- Jon Abrahams as Don
- Danny A. Abeckaser as Ami
- John Arocho as TJ buck
- Greg Bello as Luke Scott
- Tim Hopper as Bill Huxley
- Lauren Bittner as Laura
- David Bortolucci as Richard "Hands" Pope
- Jerry Ferrara as George the Greek
- Jim Parsons as Spim
- David Patrick Kelly as John Harris
- Ann Dowd as Ma Harris
- Ori Pfeffer as Uri
- Emily Wickersham as Kate

== Release ==
Gardener of Eden premiered at the Tribeca Film Festival on April 26, 2007. After the film was shown, Connolly gave a short-lived Q&A session.

== Reception ==
In a review for The Hollywood Reporter, Frank Scheck praised the film's "resolute strangeness and darkness" and Haas's "memorably quirky performance", but suggested that it "lacks the necessary dramatic urgency or black humor to connect with audiences".
