= Greensburg (TV series) =

- Genre: Documentary
- Created by: Leonardo DiCaprio; Craig Piligian
- Country of origin: United States
- Original language: English
- No. of episodes: 20

Production
- Running time: 60 minutes (incl. commercials)
- Production companies: Pilgrim Films & Television; Appian Way

Original release
- Network: Planet Green
- Release: June 15, 2008 – May 3, 2010

Greensburg is an American television series broadcast on the Planet Green television network. The show takes place in Greensburg, Kansas, and is about rebuilding that town in a sustainable way after being hit by an EF5 tornado in 2007. It ran for three seasons, from June 15, 2008 to May 3, 2010.

== Episodes ==
=== Season 1 (2008) ===
No. overall	No. in series	Title	Original release date
1	1	"The Tornado"	June 15, 2008
The people who witnessed the tornado talk about that tragic day.
2	2	"Homecoming"	June 15, 2008
3	3	"The Building Begins"	June 22, 2008
The rebuilding of Greensburg is slow going. Despite the many obstacles, buildings are going up and Steve Hewitt, city administrator, pushes the city council to make a historic decision that could catapult Greensburg into the record books as the greenest city on earth.
4	4	"The Ice Storm"	June 29, 2008
It is Christmas in Greensburg and an ice storm has swept over the town, stopping rebuilding and giving the residents another challenge to overcome.
5	5	"Mini Greenbuild"	July 27, 2008
Greensburg City Manager Steve Hewitt feels the pressure to find funds to build green.
6	6	"Hoop Dreams"	August 10, 2008
Highlights include primary election results, a basketball team attempting state championships, and worries over future green initiatives.
7	7	"State of the Union"	September 11, 2008
Greensburg is on the map and City Manager Steve Hewitt gets a surprise invitation from the White House. The townspeople are touched by corporate sponsors who help bring the town back to life with generous donations from John Deere and General Motors.
8	8	"The Anniversary"	September 19, 2008
9	9	"Storm Watch"	September 21, 2008
High School juniors Taylor Schmidt and Shane Engleken run for class President. Studio 804 leaves town. And a tornado threatens Greensburg once again.
10	10	"Back on the Map"	September 29, 2008
The town has a lot to celebrate when a once-in-a-lifetime national award puts Greensburg back on the map. The last days of summer see the opening of a pool and a blow-out 4th of July party as Greensburg looks towards the future.

=== Season 2 (2009) ===
No. overall	No. in series	Title	Original release date
11	1	"The Future Is Now"	May 3, 2009
The ground breaking of a sustainable school; Halloween turns into a special event.
12	2	"Greensburg Goes to China"	May 3, 2009
Greensburg forms an eco-partnership with a sister city in China.
13	3	"One Step Forward"	May 10, 2009
New grocery store opens in Greensburg.
14	4	"Main Street"	May 17, 2009
Main Street is torn up to create a new streetscape.
15	5	"Back in Business"	May 31, 2009
The SunChips Business Incubator completes construction.
16	6	"Second Anniversary"	June 7, 2009
The town marks the second anniversary of the tornado.

=== Season 3 (2010) ===
No. overall	No. in series	Title	Original release date
17	1	"A Final Look – A Town Reborn"	May 2, 2010
Transformation that took place after an EF5 tornado
18	2	"A Final Look – The Crossroads"	May 2, 2010
Citizens discuss the high costs of rebuilding and the modern look of the public buildings. Also, the completed City Hall and Business Incubator are examined.
19	3	"A Final Look – The Big Well"	May 3, 2010
Restoration plans for the Big Well, a piece of Greensburg's history that survived the storm, raise questions among the residents. Taylor Schmidt returns from college eager to see the town's progress.
20	4	"A Final Look – This Is Home"	May 3, 2010
Greensburg's resurgence is documented as the hospital opens, the City Hall becomes operational and the wind farm generates renewable power for the town and nearby communities.

== Reception ==
Common Sense Media rated the series 3 out of 5 stars.
