= Appian Way Productions =

American film production company

- Type: Private
- Industry: Entertainment; Motion picture
- Founded: 2001; 25 years ago
- Founder: Leonardo DiCaprio
- Headquarters: West Hollywood, California, U.S.
- Key people: Jennifer Davisson (President of Production)
- Products: Film production; Television shows
- Website: https://appianway-productions.com/

Appian Way Productions is an American film and television production company founded in 2001 by actor and producer Leonardo DiCaprio. Since its launch, Appian Way has released a diverse slate of films, including Academy Award–winning films The Aviator (2004) and The Revenant (2015), and Academy Award–nominated films The Ides of March (2011) and The Wolf of Wall Street (2013). The company has also produced television series such as The Right Stuff (2020) for Disney+.

In recent years, Appian Way has been producing documentary films, especially pertaining to progressive environmental change. The company worked in partnership with National Geographic to produce Before the Flood (2016). It also worked with Netflix on the Academy Award–nominated Virunga (2014) and Cowspiracy: The Sustainability Secret (2014). Appian is in partnership with Netflix on several additional documentaries, including How to Change the World (2015), Catching the Sun (2015), and The Ivory Game (2016). Other projects released include The 11th Hour (2007), Sea of Shadows (2019), which won the Audience Award at the 2019 Sundance Film Festival, Ice on Fire (2019) with HBO, and And We Go Green (2019).

== History ==
=== 2001–2010 ===
Appian Way Productions was founded by Leonardo DiCaprio in 2001. It takes its name from the Roman road of the same name. Its first film was The Assassination of Richard Nixon (2004), starring Sean Penn as Samuel Byck, who attempted to assassinate US president Richard Nixon in 1974. It was screened in the Un Certain Regard section at the 2004 Cannes Film Festival. The company's next film was the 2004 biopic The Aviator, produced in association with Forward Pass, IMF, and Initial Entertainment Group. Based on the 1993 non-fiction book Howard Hughes: The Secret Life by Charles Higham, the film depicted the life of Howard Hughes (DiCaprio), an aviation pioneer who became a successful film producer between the late 1920s and late 1940s while simultaneously growing more unstable due to severe obsessive–compulsive disorder. Writing for The Daily Telegraph, Sukhdev Sandhu described the film as "a gorgeous tribute to the Golden Age of Hollywood" even though it "tips the balance of spectacle versus substance in favour of the former". He praised Martin Scorsese's direction, DiCaprio and the supporting cast. The film proved to be a commercial success, with a worldwide gross of $213.7 million against a budget of $110 million. It earned a total of eleven nominations at the 77th Academy Awards, including Best Picture, Best Director (Scorsese) and Best Actor (DiCaprio), and won five of them, including a Best Supporting Actress award for Cate Blanchett.

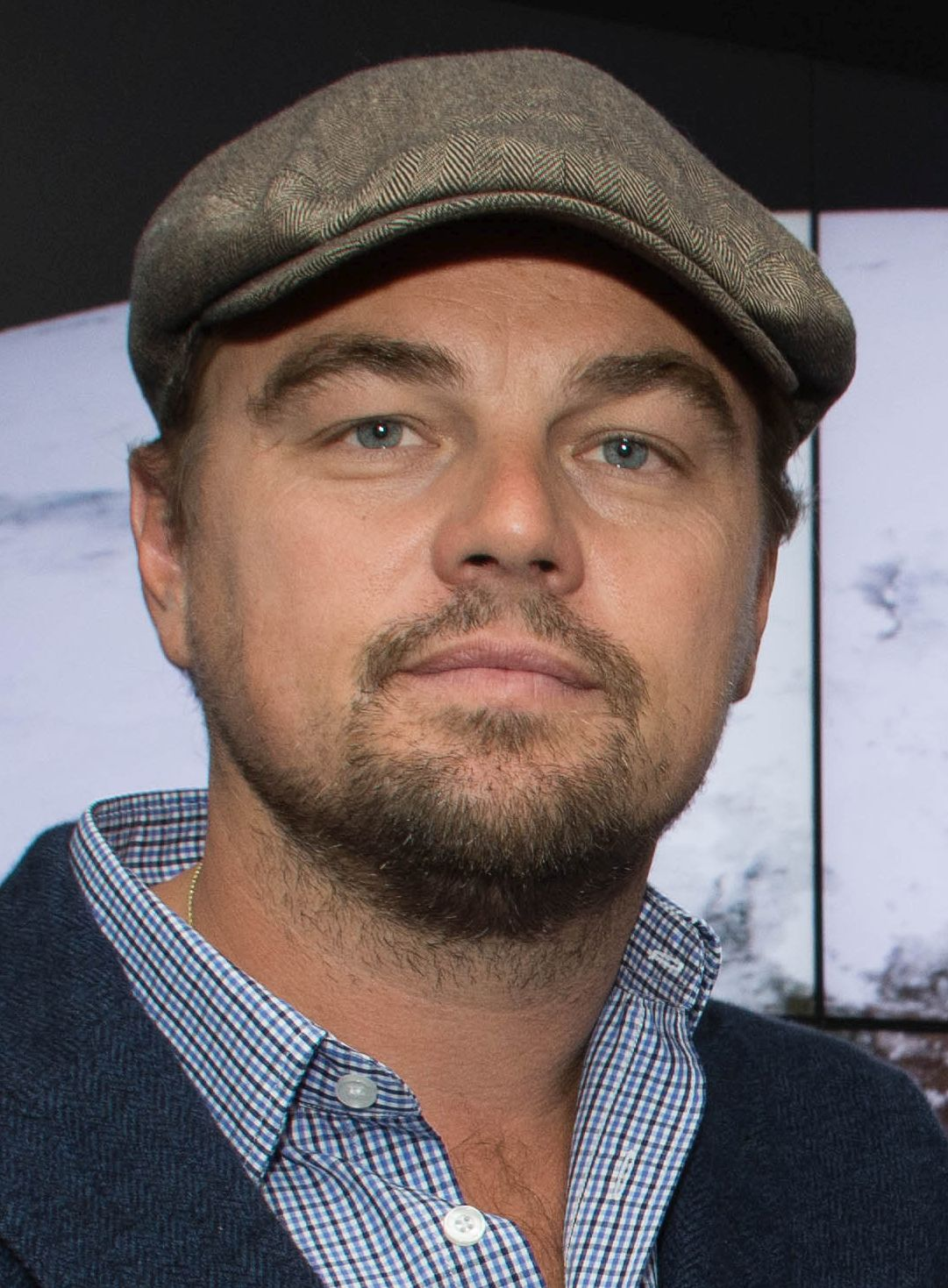
Leonardo DiCaprio—the founder of Appian Way Productions. Alongside producing many of the company's films, he also played roles in a few of them

Kevin Connolly, a close friend of DiCaprio, directed Appian Way's next film—the comedy drama Gardener of Eden (2007), which, according to The Hollywood Reporter's Frank Scheck, "lack[ed] the necessary dramatic urgency or black humor to connect with audiences". A few months later, Appian Way released The 11th Hour, a documentary about global warming. The film, featuring 50 experts who suggested solutions to various environmental problems, won the Earthwatch Environmental Film Award through the National Geographic Channel in March 2008. DiCaprio wrote a three-season television series Greensburg (2008–10) which was produced by the company.

Appian Way later produced another biopic, Public Enemies (2009), a Michael Mann-directed mob drama starring Johnny Depp and Christian Bale. Following the final years of the notorious bank robber John Dillinger (Depp) as he is pursued by FBI agent Melvin Purvis during Great Depression, the film was an adaptation of Bryan Burrough's non-fiction book Public Enemies: America's Greatest Crime Wave and the Birth of the FBI, 1933–34. A commercial success, it also received generally positive reviews, though critics found historical inaccuracies in the film. The company, along with Dark Castle Entertainment, released the 2009 psychological horror film Orphan, which told the story of a couple who, after the death of their unborn child, adopt a mysterious nine-year-old girl. The film was considered by the adoption community to promote negative stereotypes about orphans. Although the film received mixed reviews, it was a commercial success.

Scorsese reunited with the company to make the film Shutter Island (2010), a psychological thriller based on the 2003 novel of same name by Dennis Lehane. DiCaprio played U.S. Marshal Edward "Teddy" Daniels, who investigates a psychiatric facility located on an island but eventually comes to question his own sanity. A commercial success, the film received generally positive reviews; Peter Bradshaw of The Guardian praised the film's direction and performances but criticized its "silly twist ending", calling it "supremely exasperating".

=== 2011 onward ===
Red Riding Hood, directed by Catherine Hardwicke, was Appian Way's first release in 2011. The film, set in a village haunted by werewolves, follows a young girl who falls in love with an orphan woodcutter, much to her family's displeasure. Earlier in production, the film was titled The Girl with the Red Riding Hood. Although it was poorly received by critics—Mary Pols of Time named it one of the Top 10 Worst Movies of 2011—it had moderate box-office returns. The company's second release in 2011 was Detachment, a Tony Kaye-directed drama about the high school education system. George Clooney directed and co-produced the company's final film of the year The Ides of March, which is based on Beau Willimon's play Farragut North. Starring Ryan Gosling, Clooney and Philip Seymour Hoffman, this political drama takes place during a presidential primary, when an ambitious press secretary (Gosling) becomes embroiled in a political scandal. The film received positive reviews; one from The Guardian praised the direction and the performances of the cast.

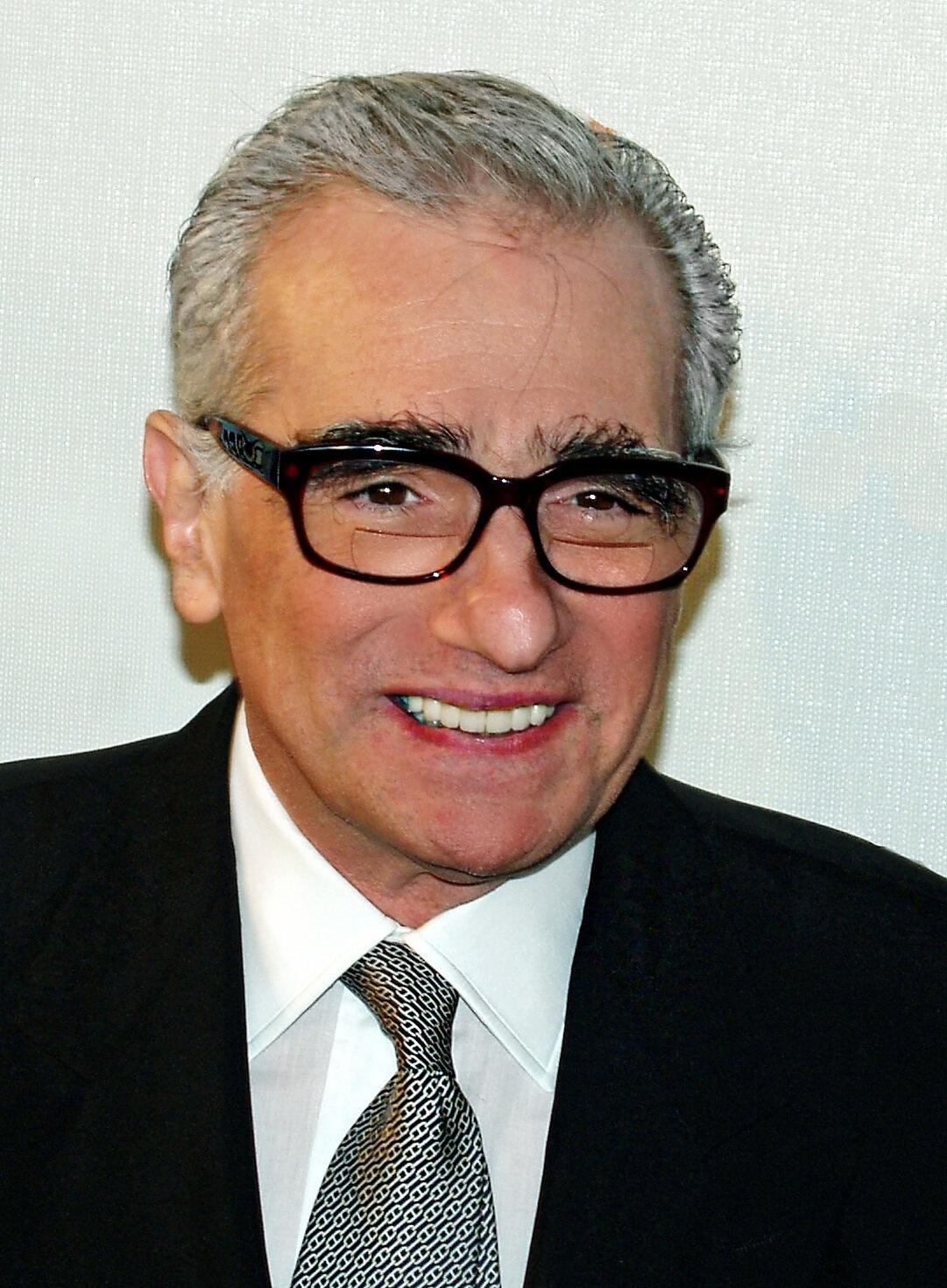
Martin Scorsese has directed four of the company's films, The Aviator (2004), Shutter Island (2010), The Wolf of Wall Street (2013), and Killers of the Flower Moon (2023), all of which were successful.

Three films were produced by Appian Way in 2013; the first was Runner Runner, an ensemble crime thriller, which The Guardian's Xan Brooks described as "a lazy, trashy film that barely goes through the motions". The thriller Out of the Furnace, the company's second release, was also negatively received by critics and was a box office bomb. Scorsese directed the company's final film in 2013—The Wolf of Wall Street, a biopic on the life of Jordan Belfort (DiCaprio), a New York stockbroker who runs a firm that engages in securities fraud and money laundering on Wall Street in the 1990s. The screenplay was adapted by Terence Winter from Belfort's memoir of the same name. The film was banned in Kenya, Malaysia and Nepal for its controversial depiction of events, explicit sexual content, profanity, and hard drug use. Nonetheless, it was a commercial success, becoming the 17th-highest-grossing film of 2013. The film was nominated for several Academy Awards, including Best Picture and Best Actor, although it failed to win in any category.

In 2015, DiCaprio produced and co-starred with Tom Hardy and Domhnall Gleeson in The Revenant, directed by Alejandro González Iñárritu. This biographical western thriller is based on in part on Michael Punke's 2002 novel of the same name, which itself was inspired by the frontiersman Hugh Glass's survival after being mauled by a grizzly bear in 1823. Co-produced with Regency Enterprises, RatPac-Dune Entertainment, Anonymous Content and M Productions, the film was well received with particular praise for the performances, direction and cinematography. "Bleak as hell but considerably more beautiful, this nightmarish plunge into a frigid, forbidding American outback is a movie of pitiless violence, grueling intensity and continually breathtaking imagery", according to Justin Change of Variety. Built on a budget of $135 million, the film earned $533 million worldwide. The Revenant received 12 nominations at the 88th Academy Awards, and won three, including Best Director and Best Actor.

In May 2016, Appian Way Productions signed a three-year, first-look production deal with Paramount Pictures. In December 2016, the company released Live by Night, based on the 2012 novel of same name by Dennis Lehane. Directed by, written by and starring Ben Affleck, this Prohibition-era gangster drama received largely unenthusiastic reviews and failed to recoup its $65 million production budget. Also that year, the company produced four documentaries, Davi's Way, The Last Shaman, The Ivory Game and Before the Flood, the last of which won the Evening Standard British Film Award for Best Documentary.

In 2017, Appian Way produced Under the Bed, a television film thriller about a young woman trying to get over a breakup, while befriending a stalker on social media. In association with Blumhouse Productions and GK Films, the company later produced Delirium, a supernatural horror film which was released later that year.

In 2023, Appian Way produced The Featherweight, the debut film of Robert Kolodny, which had its world premiere in competition at the 80th Venice International Film Festival and Martin Scorsese's Killers of the Flower Moon, which was distributed by Apple TV+ and Paramount Pictures.

In 2020, the studio signed first-look deals with Apple for documentaries and television and with Sony Pictures Entertainment for feature films.

James Rollins's Sigma Force techno-thriller novels are getting the small screen treatment. A television adaptation of the book series is in development from Absentia creator Matt Cirulnick, Amazon MGM Studios, Leonardo DiCaprio’s Appian Way Productions, Oakhurst Entertainment and Talaria Media.

== Films ==
Release date	Title	Directors	Production partners	Distributors
December 25, 2004	The Aviator	Martin Scorsese	Forward Pass; Intermedia Films; Initial Entertainment Group	Warner Bros. Pictures (North America); Buena Vista International (International)
December 29, 2004	The Assassination of Richard Nixon	Niels Mueller	Anhelo Productions; Esperanto Filmoj	ThinkFilm
April 26, 2007	Gardener of Eden	Kevin Connolly		Virtual Studios
July 24, 2009	Orphan	Jaume Collet-Serra	Dark Castle Entertainment; Studio Babelberg Motion Pictures; StudioCanal	Warner Bros. Pictures (North America/France); Kinowelt Filmverleih (Germany)
February 19, 2010	Shutter Island	Martin Scorsese	Phoenix Pictures; Sikelia Productions	Paramount Pictures
March 11, 2011	Red Riding Hood	Catherine Hardwicke		Warner Bros. Pictures
March 16, 2011	Detachment	Tony Kaye		Tribeca Film
October 7, 2011	The Ides of March	George Clooney	Columbia Pictures; Smokehouse Pictures; Exclusive Media; Cross Creek Pictures	Sony Pictures Releasing
October 4, 2013	Runner Runner	Brad Furman	Regency Enterprises; New Regency; Double Feature Films	20th Century Fox
December 6, 2013	Out of the Furnace	Scott Cooper	Red Granite Pictures; Scott Free Productions	Relativity Media
December 25, 2013	The Wolf of Wall Street	Martin Scorsese	Red Granite Pictures; Sikelia Productions; EMJAG Productions	Paramount Pictures (North America/Japan); Universal Pictures (Europe)
December 25, 2015	The Revenant	Alejandro González Iñárritu	Regency Enterprises; RatPac Entertainment; New Regency; Anonymous Content; M Productions	20th Century Fox
December 25, 2016	Live by Night	Ben Affleck	RatPac-Dune Entertainment; Pearl Street Films	Warner Bros. Pictures
May 22, 2018	Delirium	Dennis Iliadis	Blumhouse Productions; GK Films	Universal Pictures
November 21, 2018	Robin Hood	Otto Bathurst	Summit Entertainment; Safehouse Pictures; Thunder Road Films	Lionsgate
December 13, 2019	Richard Jewell	Clint Eastwood	Malpaso Productions; Misher Films; 75 Year Plan Productions	Warner Bros. Pictures
October 20, 2023	Killers of the Flower Moon	Martin Scorsese	Imperative Entertainment; Sikelia Productions; Apple Studios	Paramount Pictures; Apple TV+
February 2024	Queen of Bones	Robert Budreau	Lumanity Productions; Productivity Media	Falling Forward Films
September 20, 2024	The Featherweight	Robert Kolodny	Golden Ratio Films	Tribeca Films
January 9, 2026	Sleepwalker	Brandon Auman	Verdi Productions	Brainstorm Media
TBA	What Happens at Night	Martin Scorsese	Co-production with Apple Studios, Sikelia Productions, StudioCanal and Excellent Cadaver.	Apple Original Films

== Television ==
- Greensburg (2008–10)
- Under the Bed (2017) (Note: A television film thriller, the production is inspired by true events.)
- Pete the Cat (2017–2022)
- Grant (2020)
- The Right Stuff (2020)
- Shining Girls (2022)

== Documentaries ==
- The 11th Hour (2007)
- Virunga (2014, Netflix release)
- Cowspiracy (2015, Netflix release)
- Davi's Way (2016)
- The Last Shaman (2016)
- The Ivory Game (2016)
- Before the Flood (2016)
- Jonestown: Terror in the Jungle (2018)
- “Struggle: The Life and Lost Art of Szukalski” (2018)
- Ice on Fire (2019)
- Sea of Shadows (2019, National Geographic Channel release)
- And We Go Green (2019)
- Whose Vote Counts, Explained (2020, Netflix release)
- Kid 90 (2021)
- Fin (2021)
- The Loneliest Whale: The Search for 52 (2021)
- The Lake (2026)
