= Delirium (2018 film) =

- Official poster
- Directed by: Dennis Iliadis
- Written by: Adam Alleca
- Produced by: Jason Blum; Leonardo DiCaprio; Graham King; Jennifer Davisson; Tim Headington
- Starring: Topher Grace; Patricia Clarkson; Callan Mulvey; Genesis Rodriguez
- Cinematography: Mihai Mălaimare Jr.
- Edited by: Timothy Alverson
- Music by: Nathan Whitehead
- Production companies: Blumhouse Productions; Appian Way Productions; GK Films
- Distributed by: Universal Pictures
- Release date: May 22, 2018
- Running time: 96 minutes
- Country: United States
- Language: English
- Box office: $454,481

Delirium is a 2018 American supernatural psychological horror film directed by Dennis Iliadis and written by Adam Alleca. It stars Topher Grace, Patricia Clarkson, Callan Mulvey and Genesis Rodriguez. The movie was produced by Jason Blum through Blumhouse Productions and Leonardo DiCaprio through Appian Way Productions. It was released by Universal Pictures on May 22, 2018, via video on demand and DVD on June 5, 2018.

== Plot ==
After spending twenty years in a mental institution, Tom Walker is released back to the mansion that he has inherited from his wealthy father, a senator who recently committed suicide. Tom is placed under house arrest, and must check in via video phone daily for thirty days or he will be returned to the institution. His parole officer, Brody, alludes to a violent crime committed by him and his older brother, Alex. Tom has hallucinations of his late father, hears noises throughout the house, and receives calls from a stranger with a garbled voice, which make him believe that he is relapsing. He has a vision of a girl being drowned, and discovers a tongue preserved in a mason jar in the indoor pool's control panel, which he writes off as another hallucination. He also discovers a secret tunnel in his father's office that provides access to peepholes around the house. His brief respite comes from a market worker named Lynn, who delivers his groceries.

Tom calls Brody, who arrives to check on him. Brody misinterprets his advances and kisses him; when he rebuffs her, she becomes offended and attacks him, stealing his pills before leaving. Tom realizes that there is an intruder in the house, but discovers that it is his brother, Alex, who has escaped from prison. Although Tom believes Alex is another hallucination, Alex insists that he is real; he trashes the house, looking for hidden money from their father. Tom confesses to Lynn that when he was a teenager, he was humiliated by a girl he had a crush on in school. After he told Alex, the two scared the girl as a prank, but when she lashed out at them, an enraged Alex handcuffed Tom and forced him to watch Alex murder her. Alex went on to kill another girl, which landed him in prison and Tom in a mental institution, and their mother abandoned the family in shame and disappeared.

Brody promises to bring Tom his medication back. Tom, believing himself to be stable, returns to the pool's control panel, but still finds the jar holding the tongue. After breaking it, he discovers an underground bunker. He returns to Lynn and finds her unconscious. Panicking, he attempts to leave to get help, only to be discovered by Brody. Believing him to be killing again, Brody draws her gun before getting murdered by Alex, who prepares to murder Lynn next.

Unwilling to watch another murder, Tom attacks Alex, who overpowers him and throws him into the bunker. Inside, Tom finds a safe, as well as a chair facing a locked bedroom. Inside, he discovers a phone, which connects to the kitchen phone where he received the strange calls. He finds an old, emaciated prisoner in the locked room. He realizes the prisoner is his mother, who did not abandon them, but was kept chained up by his sadistic father; the garbled calls were from her, as it was her tongue that had been cut out. Tom frees her; Alex tearfully hugs his mother before shooting her and demanding Tom open the safe. Tom does so, revealing his father's hidden funds, but he and Lynn attack Alex. During the fight, the water pipes are damaged, and the room floods. Tom's mother chains Alex to a pipe, drowning him. Tom and Lynn are met by police. When an officer asks if the house is his, Tom replies that "It is now."

== Cast ==
- Topher Grace as Tom Walker
  - Braden Fitzgerald as Young Tom Walker
- Patricia Clarkson as Brody
- Callan Mulvey as Alex Walker
  - Cody Sullivan as Young Alex Walker
- Genesis Rodriguez as Lynn
- Robin Thomas as Efren Walker
- Daisy McCrackin as Mrs. Walker
- Marty Eli Schwartz as Frank
- Harry Groener as Psychiatrist

== Production ==
In September 2011, GK Films and Appian Way Productions announced that Dennis Iliadis was set to direct a horror film titled Home from a Black List script written by Adam Alleca. Graham King, Tim Headington, Jennifer Davisson Killoran and Steven Schneider were producing the film. In January 2014, it was announced that Leonardo DiCaprio was teaming up with Jason Blum and his Blumhouse Productions to produce the film with Topher Grace and Patricia Clarkson starring in the film. In September 2015, it was announced that Home was retitled to Delirium. The film was scheduled to debut on September 30, 2016, but was pulled from the calendar in July 2016.
