= The Ivory Game =

2016 American documentary film

- Directed by: Richard Ladkani; Kief Davidson
- Produced by: Walter Köhler; Kief Davidson; Wolfgang Knöpfler
- Cinematography: Richard Ladkani
- Production companies: Terra Mater Film Studios; Vulcan Productions; Malaika Pictures; Appian Way Productions
- Release dates: September 2, 2016 (Telluride Film Festival); November 4, 2016 (Netflix)

The Ivory Game is a 2016 American documentary film, directed by Kief Davidson and Richard Ladkani. The film examines the ivory trade, which has become a global concern, pitting governments and environmental preservationalists against poachers and Chinese ivory merchants.

The Ivory Game had its world premiere on September 16, 2016 at the Toronto International Film Festival and was released to Netflix on November 4, 2016. The film received mostly positive reviews.

== Synopsis ==
The documentary concerns the poaching of elephants in Africa, related to the ivory trade in China and Hong Kong, and the repercussions of elephant poaching if it is allowed to continue. Directors Keif Davidson and Richard Ladkani spent 16 months undercover along with their crew and several subjects investigating the killing of elephants for their tusks and the smuggling of ivory to China, where it is seen as a status symbol. While illegal, there is a rampant black market where corrupt business practices and dealings occur. The film takes its viewers from Tanzania, Kenya, and Zambia to China, Hong Kong, and Vietnam, briefly stopping in London.

The film opens in Tanzania, Africa, where Elisifa Ngowi, the head of intelligence for the Task Force, along with his officers, are conducting a nighttime sting operation in an attempt to arrest Shetani, one of the most notorious poachers in the region. Shetani is responsible for the deaths of 10,000 elephants alone. While Ngowi is tracking Shetani and the poachers, Craig Millar, head of security at the Big Life Foundation in Kenya, is trying to stop poaching from happening in the first place. Millar’s team spend their days and nights protecting elephants on the vast savanna, scaring off poachers and preventing local residents from attacking elephants that have destroyed their food crops.

In China, Andrea Crosta, who is head of investigation for Wildleaks, a whistle-blowing site for “wildlife crime”, and Hongxiang Huang, an investigative journalist, go undercover to gather evidence of illegal importing and selling of ivory. China has become the world’s biggest market for ivory. The Chinese government releases 5 tons of ivory per year to licensed dealers, making it difficult to discern between legal and illegal ivory. Crosta and Huang, along with their hidden cameras, expose many dealers bragging about having much more ivory than their licenses allow and reveals the many loopholes in ivory regulations which have helped create an intense demand.

The documentary reports that if governments do not take action now or in the near future, elephants are facing extinction within the next 15 years.

== Reception ==
On Rotten Tomatoes, a review aggregator, the film has a score of 89% based on 18 reviews with an average rating of 7.8 out of 10. On Metacritic, which assigns a weighted average score based on reviews from mainstream critics, the film received an average score of 73 with generally favourable reviews from 12 critics.

TheWrap stated that The Ivory Game vitally offers a wealth of information and means to incite action, which may be enough to get audiences involved".

Connect Statesboro called the film "impactful and will make viewers seriously consider the simple concluding invitation to take action by visiting theivorygame.com".

The Hollywood Reporter hailed the film as "sweeping, thoughtful and often wrenching", and "deserving of the attention that it is sure to receive".

== Awards and nominations ==
The Ivory Game was nominated for the People's Choice Award at the Toronto International Film Festival in 2016. Additionally, the film was nominated for and won the WWF Golden Panda Award and the Theatrical Award at the 2016 Wildscreen Festival, held in Bristol.

== Impact ==
The filmmakers' goal is to show the complexities of the multi-million dollar ivory trade throughout The Ivory Game and is meant to incite a worldwide call to stop the ivory trade. While the impact of the film remains to be seen, The Playlist states that "a better film would have taken aim at the roots of poaching and ivory as a status symbol, but The Ivory Game still manages to incite the necessary outrage".

=== Boniface Malyango ===
On March 3, 2017, in Dodoma, Tanzania the poachers that this documentary was based on were convicted in a magistrate’s court to 12 years in prison, after being convicted of leading organized crime. Poacher Boniface Methew Malyango, nicknamed "The Devil Has No Mercy", who has been connected to 15 poaching gangs across 5 countries, and has poached around 1,000 elephants, and supplied ivory to Yang Fenglan, who was the subject of this documentary, his brothers Lucas Mathayo Malyango and Abdallah Ally Chaoga were arrested on October 29, 2015 while attempting to smuggle 118 elephant tusks worth over $863,000. Malyango attempted to get his sentence appealed in 2018, but was dismissed.

== See also ==
- Last Days (2014 film), short film about the ivory trade
