= Don Thompson (producer, playwright) =

American producer and dramatist

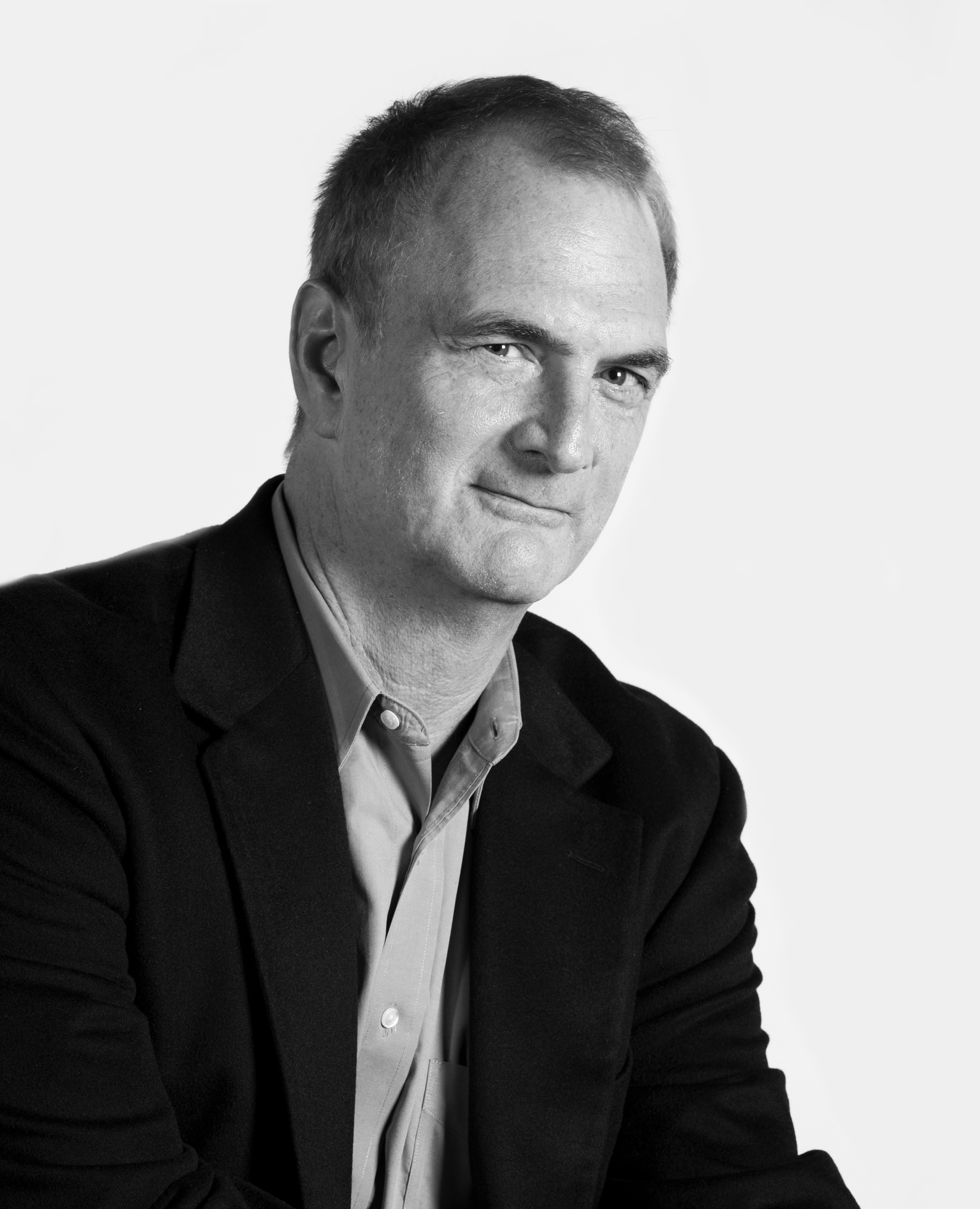
- Don Thompson
- Born: October 19, 1956 (age 69); Long Beach, California, U.S.
- Education: UCLA
- Occupations: producer, filmmaker, playwright
- Years active: 1982–present
- Spouse: Diana Takata

Don Thompson is an American producer, filmmaker and playwright. He is most notable for the film Clouds, the Sundance award-winning documentary Tibet in Song, and the plays L.A. Book of the Dead, Tibet Does Not Exist and Democracy: A Work in Progress.

== Education and career ==
Thompson attended UCLA Film School, and was mentored by Richard Walter, Chair of UCLA’s screenwriting program. Thompson also received a Master's Degree in Theater Arts from UCLA.

While at UCLA, Thompson developed a full-length screen play that was a finalist in the Samuel Goldwyn screenwriting awards.

=== Playwriting ===
Thompson’s first major creative success was the anti-war play L.A. Book of the Dead which was first performed at the Ensemble Studio Theatre, Los Angeles, in 1982 (director Renee Tadlock). L.A. Book of the Dead was revived in 1987 by the Rough Theater Company, and continued to be performed as a reader’s theater piece throughout the 1990s.

In 1995, his play Tibet Does Not Exist was first performed at the Gene Frankel theater in New York City and later, Off-Broadway (1997) by the Theater for Human Rights. The play was also performed at Oregon Stage Works in 2005 and revived at Nicu’s Spoon Theater in New York City in 2009. The play was published in paperback in 1998 with a foreword by Robert Thurman and the Dalai Lama.

Thompson has also developed two plays through the Maryland Ensemble Theater, Democracy: A Work in Progress (2004) and The God of this World (2015). The God of this World was published by Indie Theater Now in 2016 and included in ITN's Plays and Playwrights 2017 anthology.

=== Filmmaking and Producing ===
In 1999, Thompson produced, directed and wrote his first feature film, Clouds, based on a screenplay he developed while at UCLA. The film won awards, including Best New Director at the Brooklyn Film Festival, a Feature Film award at the New York Independent Film Festival, and Juror’s Choice for Narrative Feature at the Brooklyn Arts Council Film and Video Festival. William Arntz was a producer on the project, and also a co-producer of Thompson’s play, Tibet Does Not Exist.

In 2000, Thompson founded, with partner Diana Takata, the production company nextPix. Notable of the nextPix projects is the Sundance award-winning documentary Tibet in Song, directed by former political prisoner of conscience Ngawang Choephel. Thompson was a producer on the film.

Since Tibet in Song, Thompson has been affiliated with other notable films as a producer, including Ned Rifle (2015), Railway Children (2016), and Yomeddine (2018). Ned Rifle won the Prize of the Ecumenical Jury at the 65th Berlin International Film Festival, and Railway Children was nominated for the 2017 ICFT UNESCO Gandhi Prize for film at the International Film Festival of India. Yomeddine won the François Chalais Prize at the 2018 Cannes Film Festival where it screened in competition for the Palme d'Or.

=== Essays ===
After 2002, Thompson also became active as an Internet essayist. In collaboration with Michael Neff of WebDelSol Thompson and Neff published two separate anthologies of essays through Del Sol Press, Your Life Is A Movie (2006) and A World Without War (2012).

== Filmography ==
- 2000 – Clouds (producer/director/writer - with William Arntz)
- 2001 – Singing the Bones (co-producer - dir. Gordon Halloran)
- 2009 – Tibet in Song (co-producer - dir. Ngawang Choephel)
- 2013 – Bringing Tibet Home (associate producer - dir. Tenzin Tsetan Choklay artist Tenzing Rigdol)
- 2015 – Ned Rifle (executive producer - dir. Hal Hartley)
- 2016 – Railway Children (co-producer - dir. Prithvi Konanur)
- 2018 – Yomeddine (associate producer - dir. Abu Bakr Shawky)
- 2019 – This Little Land of Mines (executive producer - dir. Erin McGoff)
- 2020 – Signs of a Rebel Buddha (producer/director/writer)
- 2020 – Unapologetic (co-executive producer - dir. Ashley O'Shay)
- 2021 – The Universality of It All (executive producer - dir. Andrés Bronnimann)
- 2023 – Tathagata (executive producer - dir. Diego Prieto)
- 2025 – Where to Land (co-producer - dir. Hal Hartley)

== Plays ==
- 1982 – L.A. Book of the Dead (premiered at Ensemble Studio Theatre, Los Angeles)
- 1983 – The Wood Rose (performed at Ensemble Studio Theatre, Los Angeles)
- 1985 – Dune Messiah (adapted from the novel by Frank Herbert; performed at SMC Theatre)
- 1995 – Tibet Does Not Exist (premiered in New York at Gene Frankel Theatre in 1995; off-Broadway in 1997 at TPAC; Nicu's Spoon in 2009)
- 2004 – Democracy: A Work in Progress (premiered at Maryland Ensemble Theatre Main Stage)
- 2015 – The God of this World (developed and premiered at Maryland Ensemble Theatre Main Stage)
