= Cinema for Peace awards =

Annual film prizes

- Established: 2008 (24 years ago)
- Founders: Jaka Bizilj
- Legal status: private foundation
- Headquarters: Berlin
- Country: Germany
- Revenue: 135,507 euro (2020)
- Website: www.cinemaforpeace-foundation.org

Cinema for Peace Awards are prizes awarded by the Cinema for Peace Foundation, a Berlin-based initiative that claims to raise awareness for the social relevance of films. Since 2002, Cinema for Peace has been inviting film makers, humanitarian and human rights activists, and public figures to its annual awards ceremony in Berlin to honor a selection of cinematic works on humanitarian and environmental issues. The event occurs at the same time as (but not as part of) the Berlin International Film Festival.

== History ==
Following the September 11 attacks in 2001, Jaka Bizilj launched the Cinema for Peace initiative with the annual gala as a platform for communicating humanitarian, political and social issues through the medium of film. Bob Geldof described the awards gala as "the Oscars with brains".

== Activities ==
Cinema for Peace as global initiative regularly acts in many countries. Cinema for Peace screenings, campaigns, advocacy events, and galas have been taking place for example at the Filmfestival in Cannes, in Los Angeles on the occasions of the Golden Globes and on Oscar weekend, in Uganda at the conference of the International Criminal Court, and in Berlin, where Cinema for Peace annually highlights the most valuable films of the year at the Cinema for Peace Gala.

The Cinema for Peace Foundation organizes various monthly screenings, mainly through partnering cinemas, such as the Schikaneder in Vienna

Cinema for Peace distributed the Bosnian Oscar-winning war satire No Man's Land by Danis Tanovic. In 2014, Jaka Bizilj as the Founder of Cinema for Peace invited Pussy Riot to the Olympic Games in Sochi and brought them to Hollywood and to Washington in order to promote global human rights responsibility and advocate a global Sanction List for human rights offenders.

== Committee and supporters ==
Among the Cinema for Peace speakers have been: Buzz Aldrin, Antonio Banderas, Deepak Chopra, George Clooney, Catherine Deneuve, Leonardo DiCaprio, Bob Geldof, Richard Gere, Dustin Hoffman, Elton John, Nicole Kidman, Sir Christopher Lee, Sean Penn, Tim Robbins, Susan Sarandon, Hilary Swank, Wim Wenders, Ban Ki-moon, Luis Moreno-Ocampo and Fatou Bensouda as well as Mikhail Gorbachev.

== Awards ==
Year	Award	Category	Work	Significant Person(s)	Result	Ref.
2004	Cinema for Peace Dove	Most Valuable Film	In My Country	John Boorman	Won	
2005	Cinema for Peace Dove	Most Valuable Film	Hotel Rwanda	Terry George	Won	
2006	Cinema for Peace Dove	Most Valuable Film	Good Night, and Good Luck	George Clooney	Won	
2006	Cinema for Peace Dove	Most Valuable Work of a Director, Producer, or Screenwriter	The Girl in the Café	David Yates (Director), Richard Curtis (Writer)	Won	
2007	Cinema for Peace Dove	Most Valuable Film	Flags of Our Fathers	Clint Eastwood	Won	
2007	Cinema for Peace Dove	Most Valuable Film	Letters from Iwo Jima	Clint Eastwood	Won	
2007	Cinema for Peace Dove	Most Valuable Film Actor	The Last King of Scotland	Forest Whitaker	Won	
2007	Cinema for Peace Dove	Most Valuable Director	Goodbye Bafana	Bille August	Won	
2007	International Human Rights Film Award		Coca: Die Taube von Tschetschenien	Eric Bergkraut (Director)	Won	
2008	Cinema for Peace Dove	Most Valuable Film	Persepolis	Marjane Satrapi (Director) and Vincent Paronnaud (Director)	Won	
2008	Cinema for Peace Dove	Most Valuable Film	A Mighty Heart	Michael Winterbottom (Director)	Nominated	
2008	Cinema for Peace Dove	Most Valuable Film	In the Valley of Elah	Paul Haggis (Director)	Nominated	
2008	Cinema for Peace Dove	Most Valuable Film	The Diving Bell and the Butterfly	Julian Schnabel (Director)	Nominated	
2008	Cinema for Peace Dove	Most Valuable Film	Juno	Jason Reitman (Director)	Nominated	
2008	Cinema for Peace Dove	Most Valuable Film	Charlie Wilson's War	Mike Nichols (Director)	Nominated	
2008	Cinema for Peace Dove	Most Valuable Documentary	Trouble - Teatime in Heiligendamm	Ralf Schmerberg	Won	
2008	Cinema for Peace Dove	Most Valuable Documentary	Sicko	Michael Moore (Director), Mind Pirates Community	Nominated	
2008	Cinema for Peace Dove	Most Valuable Documentary	Dafur Now	Ted Braun (Director)	Nominated	
2008	Cinema for Peace Dove	Short Film	The Spirit	Joseph Fiennes (Director)	Won	
2008	Cinema for Peace Dove	Special	The Experimental Witch	Aaron J. March (Director), initiated by Paolo Coelho and created with the original work of 14 filmmakers from around the world.	Won	
2008	International Green Film Award		Earth	Alastair Fothergill (Director), Mark Linfield (Director)	Won	
2008	International Green Film Award		The Unforeseen	Laura Dunn (Director)	Nominated	
2008	International Green Film Award		Arid Lands	Grant Aaker (Director), Josh Wallaert (Director)	Nominated	
2008	International Human Rights Film Award		Enemies of Happiness	Eva Mulvad (Director)	Won	
2009	Cinema for Peace Dove	Most Valuable Film	Milk	Gus Van Sant (Director)	Won	
2009	Cinema for Peace Dove	Most Valuable Film	8	Jane Campion (Director), Gael García Benal (Director), Jan Kounen (Director)	Nominated	
2009	Cinema for Peace Dove	Most Valuable Film	Australia	Baz Luhrmann (Director)	Nominated	
2009	Cinema for Peace Dove	Most Valuable Film	A Woman in Berlin	Max Färberböck (Director)	Nominated	
2009	Cinema for Peace Dove	Most Valuable Film	Blind Loves	Juraj Lehotsky (Director)	Nominated	
2009	Cinema for Peace Dove	Most Valuable Film	Changeling	Clint Eastwood (Director)	Nominated	
2009	Cinema for Peace Dove	Most Valuable Film	Che: Part One	Steven Soderbergh (Director)	Nominated	
2009	Cinema for Peace Dove	Most Valuable Film	The Baader Meinhof Complex	Uli Edel (Director)	Nominated	
2009	Cinema for Peace Dove	Most Valuable Film	Doubt	John Patrick Shanley (Director)	Nominated	
2009	Cinema for Peace Dove	Most Valuable Film	Frost/Nixon	Ron Howard (Director)	Nominated	
2009	Cinema for Peace Dove	Most Valuable Film	Hunger	Steve McQueen (Director)	Nominated	
2009	Cinema for Peace Dove	Most Valuable Film	The Caiman	Nanni Moretti (Director)	Nominated	
2009	Cinema for Peace Dove	Most Valuable Film	Machan	Uberto Pasolini (Director)	Nominated	
2009	Cinema for Peace Dove	Most Valuable Documentary	Das Herz von Jenin	Leon Geller	Won	
2009	Cinema for Peace Dove	Most Valuable Documentary	Bigger, Stronger, Faster*	Chris Bell (Director)	Nominated	
2009	Cinema for Peace Dove	Most Valuable Documentary	Kalinovski Square	Yury Khashchavatski (Director)	Nominated	
2009	Cinema for Peace Dove	Most Valuable Documentary	Kassim the Dream	Kief Davidson (Director)	Nominated	
2009	Cinema for Peace Dove	Most Valuable Documentary	Leaving Fear Behind	Dhondup Wangchen (Director)	Nominated	
2009	Cinema for Peace Dove	Most Valuable Documentary	Shooting Robert King	Richard Parry (Director)	Nominated	
2009	Cinema for Peace Dove	Most Valuable Documentary	Tough Being Loved by Jerks	Daniel Leconte (Director)	Nominated	
2009	Cinema for Peace Dove	Justice	Pray the Devil Back to Hell	Gini Reticker	Won	
2009	Cinema for Peace Dove	Justice	For a Moment, Freedom	Arash T. Riahi (Director)	Nominated	
2009	Cinema for Peace Dove	Justice	Gomorrah	Matteo Garrone (Director)	Nominated	
2009	Cinema for Peace Dove	Justice	Johnny Mad Dog	Jean-Stéphane Sauvaire (Director)	Nominated	
2009	Cinema for Peace Dove	Justice	Katyń	Andrzej Wajda (Director)	Nominated	
2009	Cinema for Peace Dove	Justice	Lemon Tree	Eran Riklis (Director)	Nominated	
2009	Cinema for Peace Dove	Justice	Milk	Gus Van Sant (Director)	Nominated	
2009	Cinema for Peace Dove	Special	Valkyrie	Bryan Singer (Director)	Won	
2009	International Green Film Award		Blue Gold: World Water Wars	Sam Bozzo (Director)	Won	
2009	International Green Film Award		Fields of Fuel	Joshua Tickell (Director)	Nominated	
2009	International Green Film Award		Flow: For Love of Water	Irena Salina (Director), Dan Berger (Director)	Nominated	
2009	International Human Rights Film Award		Enemies of Happiness	Eva Mulvad	Won	
2010	Cinema for Peace Dove	Most Valuable Film	The White Ribbon	Michael Haneke (Director)	Won	
2010	Cinema for Peace Dove	Most Valuable Film	Avatar	James Cameron (Director)	Nominated	
2010	Cinema for Peace Dove	Most Valuable Film	District 9	Neill Blomkamp (Director)	Nominated	
2010	Cinema for Peace Dove	Most Valuable Film	Entre nos	Gloria La Morte (Director), Paola Mendoza (Director]	Nominated	
2010	Cinema for Peace Dove	Most Valuable Film	Five Minutes of Heaven	Oliver Hirschbiegel (Director)	Nominated	
2010	Cinema for Peace Dove	Most Valuable Film	The Ghost Writer	Roman Polanski (Director)	Nominated	
2010	Cinema for Peace Dove	Most Valuable Film	Invictus	Clint Eastwood (Director)	Nominated	
2010	Cinema for Peace Dove	Most Valuable Film	The Messenger	Oren Moverman (Director)	Nominated	
2010	Cinema for Peace Dove	Most Valuable Film	Triage	Danis Tanovic (Director)	Nominated	
2010	Cinema for Peace Dove	Most Valuable Film	Up in the Air	Jason Reitman (Director)	Nominated	
2010	Cinema for Peace Dove	Most Valuable Documentary	Das Mädchen und das Foto	Marc Wiese	Won	
2010	Cinema for Peace Dove	Most Valuable Documentary	Kimjongilia	NC Heikin (Director)	Nominated	
2010	Cinema for Peace Dove	Most Valuable Documentary	Murder File: Hrant Dink	Osman Okkan (Director), Simone Sitte (Director)	Nominated	
2010	Cinema for Peace Dove	Most Valuable Documentary	Reporter	Eric Daniel Metzgar (Director)	Nominated	
2010	Cinema for Peace Dove	Most Valuable Documentary	Sergio	Greg Barker (Director)	Nominated	
2010	Cinema for Peace Dove	Most Valuable Documentary	Tibet in Song	Ngawang Choephel (Director)	Nominated	
2010	Cinema for Peace Dove	Most Valuable Documentary	Toumast	Dominique Margot (Director)	Nominated	
2010	Cinema for Peace Dove	Justice	Children of War	Bryan Single	Won	
2010	Cinema for Peace Dove	Justice	The Stoning of Soraya M.	Cyrus Nowrasteh (Director)	Won	
2010	Cinema for Peace Dove	Justice	Women in Shroud	Farid Haerinejad (Director), Mohammad Reza Kazemi (Director)	Won	
2010	Cinema for Peace Dove	Justice	As We Forgive	Laura Waters Hinson (Director)	Nominated	
2010	Cinema for Peace Dove	Justice	Capitalism: A Love Story	Michael Moore (Director)	Nominated	
2010	Cinema for Peace Dove	Justice	The Most Dangerous Man in America	Rich Goldsmith (Director), Judith Ehrlich (Director)	Nominated	
2010	Cinema for Peace Dove	Justice	The Time That Remains	Elia Suleiman (Director)	Nominated	
2010	Cinema for Peace Dove	Reconciliation	Five Minutes of Heaven	Oliver Hirschbiegel (Director)	Nominated	
2010	Cinema for Peace Dove	Special	Triage	Danis Tanovic (Director)	Won	
2010	International Green Film Award		Crude	Joe Berlinger (Director)	Won	
2010	International Green Film Award		Bananas!*	Fredrik Gertten (Director)	Nominated	
2010	International Green Film Award		Home	Yan Arthus-Bertrand (Director)	Nominated	
2010	International Green Film Award		Into Eternity (film)	Michael Madsen (Director)	Nominated	
2010	International Justice and Human Rights Film Award		Children of War	Bryan Single	Won	

=== 2011 ===
- The Cinema for Peace Dove for The Most Valuable Film of the Year: Of Gods and Men by Xavier Beauvois
- The Cinema for Peace Dove for The Most Valuable Documentary of the Year: Skateistan: Four Wheels and a Board in Kabul by Kai Sehr
- The Cinema for Peace Dove for Justice: Blood in the Mobile by Frank Piasecki Poulsen
- The International Green Film Award: Message from Pandora by James Cameron, Harmony: A New Way of Looking at Our World by Julie Bergman, Sender Stuart Sender; Jane's Journey by Lorenz Knauer

=== 2012 ===
- The Cinema for Peace Dove for The Most Valuable Film of the Year: In the Land of Blood and Honey by Angelina Jolie
- The Cinema for Peace Dove for The Most Valuable Documentary of the Year: Paradise Lost 3: Purgatory by Joe Berlinger
- The Cinema for Peace Dove for Justice: Granito by Pamela Yates; Justice for Sergei by Hans Hermans and Martin Maat
- The International Green Film Award: Burning in the Sun by Cambria Matlow and Morgan Robinson

=== 2013 ===
- The Cinema for Peace Dove for The Most Valuable Film of the Year: Lincoln by Steven Spielberg
- The Cinema for Peace Dove for The Most Valuable Documentary of the Year: Searching for Sugar Man by Malik Bendjelloul; The Gatekeepers by Dror Moreh
- The Cinema for Peace Dove for Justice: No by Pablo Larraín
- The International Green Film Award: Bitter Seeds by Micha X. Peled

=== 2014 ===
- The Cinema for Peace Dove for The Most Valuable Film of the Year: 12 Years a Slave by Steve McQueen
- The Cinema for Peace Dove for The Most Valuable Documentary of the Year: Syria: Children on the Frontline by Marcel Mettelsiefen
- The Cinema for Peace Dove for Justice: #chicagoGirl: The Social Network Takes on a Dictator by Joe Piscatella
- The International Green Film Award: Big Men by Rachel Boynton

=== 2015 ===
- The Cinema for Peace Dove for The Most Valuable Film of the Year: Selma by Ava DuVernay; Timbuktu by Abderrahmane Sissako
- The Cinema for Peace Dove for The Most Valuable Documentary of the Year: Drone by Tonje Hessen Schei; E-Team by Katy Chevigny and Ross Kauffman
- The Cinema for Peace Dove for Justice: Three Windows and a Hanging by Isa Qosja; Miners Shot Down by Rehad Desai
- The International Green Film Award: Virunga by Orlando von Einsiedel

=== 2016 ===
- The Cinema for Peace Dove for The Most Valuable Film of the Year: Beasts of No Nation by Cary Joji Fukunaga; A Tale of Love and Darkness by Natalie Portman
- The Cinema for Peace Dove for The Most Valuable Documentary of the Year: Cartel Land by Matthew Heineman
- The Cinema for Peace Dove for Justice: Watchers of the Sky by Edet Belzberg
- The International Green Film Award: Racing Extinction by Louie Psihoyos

=== 2017 ===
- The Cinema for Peace Dove for The Most Valuable Film of the Year: Hacksaw Ridge by Mel Gibson
- The Cinema for Peace Dove for The Most Valuable Documentary of the Year: Keep Quiet by Sam Blair and Joe Martin
- The Cinema for Peace Dove for Justice: Snowden by Oliver Stone
- The International Green Film Award: The Ivory Game by Richard Ladkani and Kief Davidson

=== 2018 ===
- The Cinema for Peace Dove for The Most Valuable Film of the Year: The Post by Steven Spielberg
- The Cinema for Peace Dove for The Most Valuable Documentary of the Year: Cries from Syria by Evgeny Afineevsky
- The Cinema for Peace Dove for Justice: The Breadwinner by Nora Twomey
- The International Green Film Award: Jane by Brett Morgen

=== 2019 ===
- The Cinema for Peace Dove for The Most Valuable Film of the Year: Capernaum by Nadine Labaki
- The Cinema for Peace Dove for The Most Valuable Documentary of the Year: The Heart of Nuba by Kenneth A. Carlson
- The Cinema for Peace Dove for The Political Film of the Year: Watergate by Charles Ferguson
- The Cinema for Peace Dove for Justice: Two Catalonias by Álvaro Longoria and Gerardo Olivares
- The Cinema for Peace Dove for Women’s Empowerment: RBG by Julie Cohen and Betsy West
- The International Green Film Award: The Elephant Queen by Mark Deeble and Victoria Stone

=== 2020 ===
- The Cinema for Peace Dove for The Most Valuable Film of the Year: 1917 by Sam Mendes
- The Cinema for Peace Dove for The Most Valuable Documentary of the Year: The Cave by Feras Fayyad
- The Cinema for Peace Dove for The Political Film of the Year: Official Secrets by Gavin Hood
- The Cinema for Peace Dove for Justice: The Collini Case by Marco Kreuzpaintner; A Regular Women by Sherry Hormann
- The Cinema for Peace Dove for Women’s Empowerment: A Girl from Mogadishu by Mary McGuckian; Maiden by Alex Holmes
- The International Green Film Award: Santuario by Álvaro Longoria; Sea of Shadows by Richard Ladkani, Sean Bogle and Matthew Podolsky

=== 2021 ===
- The Cinema for Peace Dove for The Most Valuable Film of the Year: Quo Vadis, Aida? by Jasmila Žbanić
- The Cinema for Peace Dove for The Most Valuable Documentary of the Year: The Mole: Undercover In North Korea by Mads Brugger; Welcome to Chechnya by David France
- The Cinema for Peace Dove for The Political Film of the Year: Mayor by David Osit
- The Cinema for Peace Dove for Justice: The Dissident by Bryan Fogel
- The Cinema for Peace Dove for Women’s Empowerment: Nasrin by Jeff Kaufman
- The Cinema for Peace Dove for Global Health: Coronation by Ai Weiwei
- The International Green Film Award: David Attenborough: A Life on Our Planet

=== 2022 ===
- The Cinema for Peace Dove for The Most Valuable Film of the Year: CODA by Sian Seder
- The Cinema for Peace Dove for The Most Valuable Documentary of the Year: Flee by Jonas Poher Rasmussen
- The Cinema for Peace Dove for The Political Film of the Year: Not Going Quietly by Nicholas Bruckman; Courage by Aliaksei Paluyan; The Caviar Connection by Benoit Bringer
- The Cinema for Peace Dove for Justice: Navalny by Daniel Roher
- The Cinema for Peace Dove for Women’s Empowerment: Writing With Fire by Sushimit Ghosh and Rintu Thomas
- The Cinema for Peace Dove for Global Health: Introducing, Selma Blair by Rachel Fleit
- The International Green Film Award: Milked by Amy Taylor; Eating Our Way to Extinction by Ludo Brockway and Otto Brockway

=== 2023 ===
- The Cinema for Peace Dove for The Most Valuable Film of the Year: All Quiet on the Western Front by Edward Berger
- The Cinema for Peace Dove for The Most Valuable Documentary of the Year: 20 Days in Mariupol by Mystlav Chernov
- The Cinema for Peace Dove for The Political Film of the Year: The Corridors of Power by Dror Moreh
- The Cinema for Peace Dove for Justice: Argentina, 1985 by Santiago Mitre
- The Cinema for Peace Dove for Women’s Empowerment: She Said by Maria Schrader; In Her Hands by Marcel Mettelsiefen, Tamana Ayazi
- The Cinema for Peace Dove for Global Health: How To Survive a Pandemic by David France
- The International Green Film Award: The Territory by Alex Pritz; All That Breathes by Shaunak Sen

=== 2024 ===
- The Cinema for Peace Dove for The Most Valuable Film of the Year: Golda by Guy Nattiv; The Zone of Interest by Jonathan Glazer; One Life by James Hawes
- The Cinema for Peace Dove for The Most Valuable Documentary of the Year: Motherland by Hanna Badziaka and Alexander Mihalkovich,
- The Cinema for Peace Dove for The Political Film of the Year: Bobi Wine: The People’s President by Moses Bwayo and Christopher Sharp
- The Cinema for Peace Dove for Justice: Lakota Nation vs. United States by Jesse Short Bull and Laura Tomaselli
- The Cinema for Peace Dove for Women’s Empowerment: Four Daughters by Kaouther Ben Hania
- The International Green Film Award: We Are Guardians by Chelsea Greene, Edivan Guajajara and Rob Grobman; Common Ground by Josh Tickell and Rebecca Harrell Tickell
- The Cinema for Peace Dove for Global Health: Pay or Die by Scott Alexander Ruderman and Rachael Dyer

=== 2025 ===
- The Cinema for Peace Dove for The Most Valuable Film of the Year: I'm Still Here by Walter Salles; The Seed of The Sacred Fig by Mohammad Rasoulof
- The Cinema for Peace Dove for The Most Valuable Documentary of the Year: The Click Trap by Peter Porta; Soundtrack to a Coup d’Etat by Johan Grimonprez
- The Cinema for Peace Dove for The Political Film of the Year: The Bibi Files by Alexis Bloom
- The Cinema for Peace Dove for Justice: Black Box Diaries by Shiori Ito
- The Cinema for Peace Dove for Women’s Empowerment: Diane Von Furstenberg: Woman in Charge by Sharmeen Obaid-Chinoy and Trish Dalton
- The International Green Film Award: Black Snow by Alina Simone
- The Cinema for Peace Dove for Global Health, Technology and Human Enhancement: Eternal You by Hans Block, Moritz Riesewieck
- Cinema for Peace Special Dove 2025 for Portraying the Plight of Palestinian Civilians: I Shall Not Hate by Tal Barda
