= Festival International de Programmes Audiovisuels =

International non-fiction film festival

Festival international de programmes audiovisuels FIPADOC
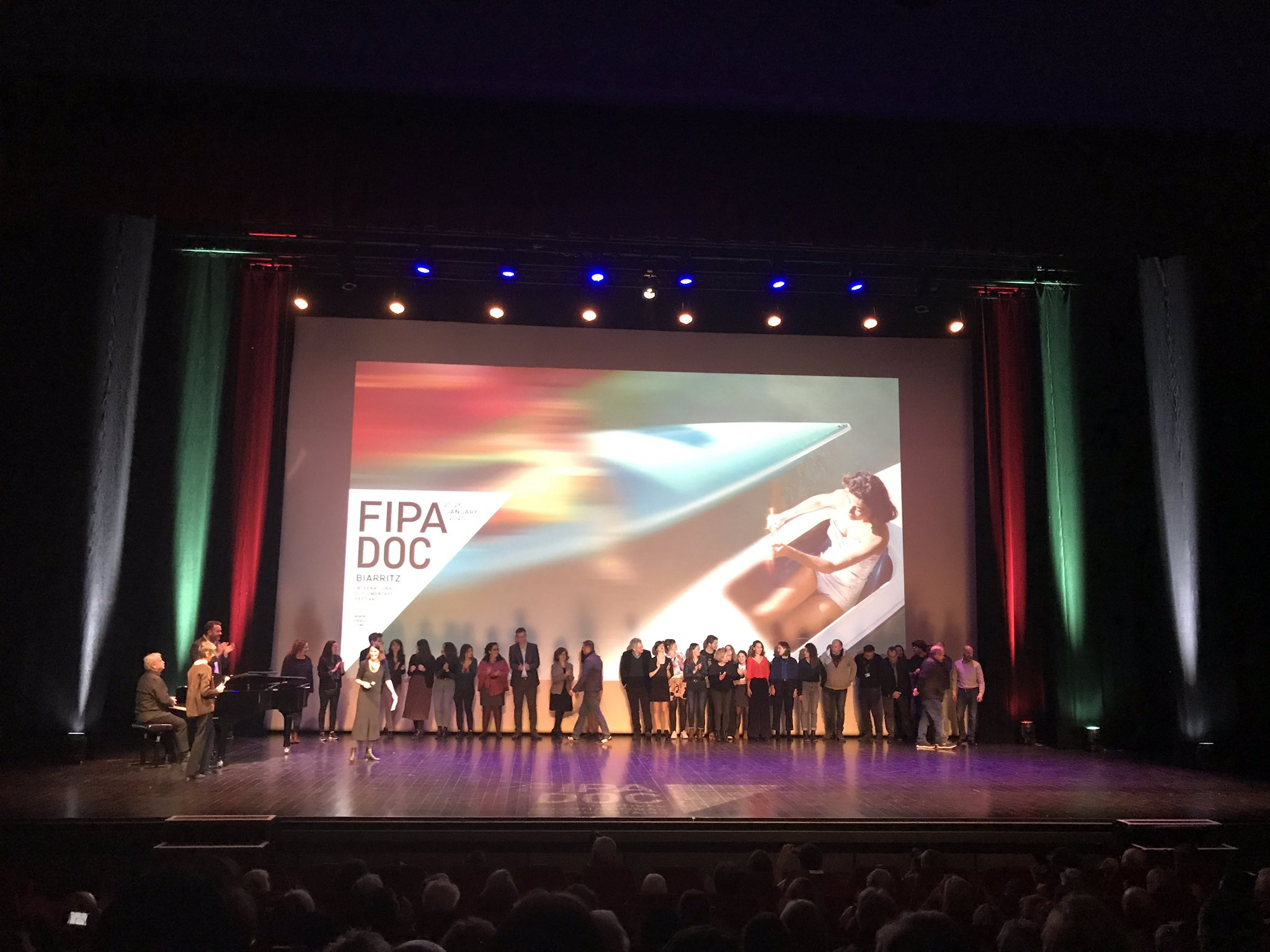
- Closing Ceremony of FIPADOC 2020
- Location: Biarritz, France
- Founded: 1987; 39 years ago (as International Film Festival)
- Founded by: Michel Mitrani
- Directors: Anne Georget
- Website: fipadoc.com

The International Festival of Audiovisual Programmes or International Documentary Festival – FIPADOC (French: Festival International de Programmes Audiovisuels (FIPA)), founded in 1987 by Michel Mitrani (1930–1996), was first held in Cannes in October 1987.^{,} In 2019, the FIPA became FIPADOC,^{,}^{,} an international festival specializing in non-fiction films for all screens and all formats.

== History ==
The festival was moved to Nice in its eighth year (1995), and, since 1997, has been held in Biarritz, France. It is the only international festival that defends all creative genres: drama, series, creative or investigative documentary, performing arts, transmedia and new talent.^{,}^{,}

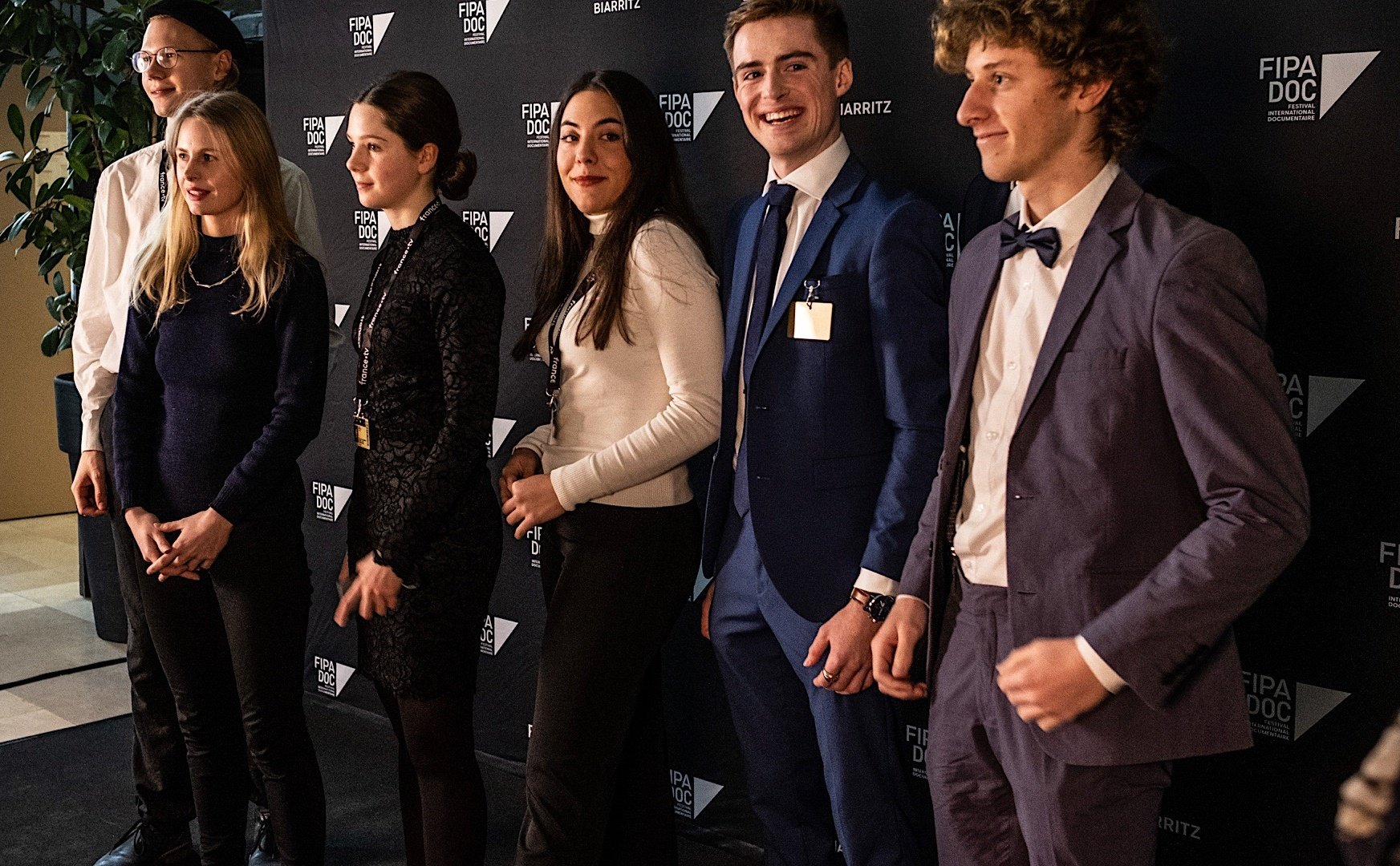
European Jury FIPADOC 2020: Yann Blake, Antoine Bourgeais, Victoria Kloch, Max Liebstein, Giorgia Mazzanti et Joanna Nowiska

== Editions ==
=== 2020 ===
Award	Jury	Film awarded
Grand Prix - Best International Documentary	Maryam Ebrahimi, Mary Stephen, Martijn Te Pas	The Human Factor by Dror Moreh (U.K.)
Grand Prix - Best French Documentary	Gilles Élie-Dit-Cosaque^{(fr)}, Kathleen Evin^{(fr)}, Xavier Villetard	« Danser sa peine » by Valérie Müller^{(fr)} (France)
Grand Prix - Best Music Documentary	Jean-Daniel Beauvallet^{(fr)}, Éric Darmon^{(fr)}, Selma Mutal	Once Aurora by Stian Servoss and Benjamin Langeland (Norway)
Grand Prix - Best Impact Documentary	Delphine Deloget^{(fr)}, Sébastien Deurdilly, Carole Vezilier	21 Days Inside by Zohar Wagner (Israel)
INA Smart Award	Agnès Alfandari, Richard Copans^{(fr)}, Victoria Mapplebeck	Traveling While Black by Roger Ross Williams, Félix Lajeunesse, Paul Raphaël, Ayesha Nadarajah (Canada)
Mitrani Award	Jean-Paul Tribout^{(fr)}, Xavier Gubert, Marion Sarraut^{(fr)}, Jérôme Clément-Wilz and Blanche Guichou^{(fr)}.	Honeyland by Ljubomir Stefanov and Tamara Kotevska (North Macedonia)
European Jury Award	Yann Blake, Antoine Bourgeais, Victoria Kloch, Max Liebstein, Giorgia Mazzanti, Joanna Nowiska, Marius Penu.	La Cravate by Étienne Chaillou and Mathias Théry (France)
Short Film Award	Georges Bollon, Eveline Kluger Kadish, Corina Schwingruber Ilić	Obon by Andre Hörmann and Anne Samo (Germany)
Prix du Public - Public Award	The audience of each film screening.	Sous la peau by Robin Harsch (Switzerland)
Tënk Award		The Dam by Natalia Koniarz (Poland)
Erasmus+ Young Creator Award	Rea Apostolides, Anna Feillou, Sébastien Legay.	For Eunice by Jaan Stevens (Belgium)

=== 2018 ===
The 31st edition of Fipa took place in Biarritz from 23 to 28 January 2018.

==== Drama ====
- Fipa d'or: Cops by Stefan A. Lukacs (Austria)
- Fipa d'or Best Actress: Ursula Strauss in Meine Fremde Freundin (Germany)
- Fipa d'or Best Actor: Tobias Kersloot in Van God Los : Kerstkado (The Netherlands)
- Fipa d'or Best Script: Katrin Bühlig & Daniel Nocke for Meine Fremde Freundin (Germany)
- Fipa d'or Best Original Score: Jesper Ankarfeldt for Van God Los : Kerstkado (The Netherlands)

==== Series ====
- Fipa d'or: Sob Pressão by Jorge Furtado, Mini Kerti, Luiz Noronha, Cláudio Torres & Renato Fagundes (Brazil)
- Fipa d'or Best Actor: Julio Andrade pour le rôle du « Dr. Evandro Moreira » dans Sob Pressão (Brazil)
- Fipa d'or Best Actress: Marjorie Estiano for the character of « Dr. Carolina Almeida » in Sob Pressão (Brazil)
- Fipa d'or Best Script: Jorge Furtado, Lucas Paraizo, Antonio Prata, Marcio Alemão for Sob Pressão (Brazil)
- Fipa d'or Best Original Score: Stephen Rae for Safe Harbour (Australia)

==== Other formats ====
- Fipa d'or Performing Arts: Marianne Faithfull, fleur d'âme by Sandrine Bonnaire (France)
- Fipa d'or International : Stronger Than A Bullet by Maryam Ebrahimi (Sweden, France, Qatar)
- Fipa d'or National : En équilibre de Antarès Bassis & Pascal Auffray
- Special mention National : Les Enfants du 209, rue Saint-Maur, Paris Xe by Ruth Zylberman

==== Other awards ====
- Michel Mitrani Drama Prize: Heyvan by Bahram Ark & Bahman Ark (Iran)
- Michel Mitrani Prize Documentary: Heimat by Sam Peeters (Belgium)
- Innovation Prize: Altération by Jérôme Blanquet (France)
- Erasmus+ Prize: Magic Moments de Martina Buchelová (Slovakia)
- Young Europeans Jury Prize: Enfants du hasard by Thierry Michel & Pascal Colson
- Audience Award: Le temps des égarés by Virginie Sauveur (France)
- Hackathon Prize: Dessine-moi un futur - Developed by the team formed by Alice Bédard, Sandrine Corbeil, Hugo Denepoux, Florian Pannetier, Quentin Piat & Alexandre Rosenthal

=== 2017 ===
The 30^{th} edition of Fipa took place in Biarritz from 24 to 29 January 2017.

==== Drama ====
- Fipa d'or: NW by Saul Dibb (United-Kingdom)
- Fipa d'or Best Actress: Alba Gaia Bellugi in Manon 20 ans (France)
- Fipa d'or Best Actor: Elias Anton in Barracuda (Australia)
- Fipa d'or Best Script : Jack Thorne for National Treasure [archive] (United-Kingdom)
- Fipa d'or Best Original Score: Cristobal Tapia by Veer for National Treasure [archive](United-Kingdom)

==== Series ====
- Fipa d'or: Ramona by Guillermo Calderón, Carmen Gloria López & Patricio Pereira (Chili)
- Fipa d'or Best Actor: Matteo Simoni, Rik Verheye, Bart Hollanders & Stef Aerts in Callboys (Belgium)
- Fipa d'or Best Actress: Gianina Frutero in Ramona (Chili)
- Fipa d'or Best Script: Aurélien Molas, Valentine Milville & José Caltagirone for Crime Time - Hora de Perigo (France)
- Fipa d'or Best Original Score: Thomas Couzinier & Frédéric Kooshmanian for Zone blanche (France)

==== Other formats ====
- Fipa d'or Documentary: Tahqiq fel djenna de Merzak Allouache (Algeria, France)
- Fipa d'or Reportage and Investigation: Ambulance by Mohamed Jabaly (Norway, Palestine)
- Fipa d'or Performing Arts: Currentzis. The Classical Rebel by Bernhard Fleischer (Austria, Germany, France)
- Fipa d'or Smart Fipa: Zero Impunity by Nicolas Blies, Stéphane Hueber-Blies & Marion Guth (Luxembourg, France)

==== Other awards ====
- Michel Mitrani Prize: Sve je više jtvari koje dolaze by Jelena Gavrilović
- Young Europeans Jury Prize: Ambulance by Mohamed Jabaly
- Prix Télérama: Tahqiq fel djenna by Merzak Allouache
- Erasmus+ Prize: Polski by Rubén Rojas Cuauhtémoc
- Audience Award: Latifa, une femme dans la république by Jarmila Buzkova (France)
- EuroFipa of Honour: Hanka Kasteliková (Czech Republic)
- Hackathon Prize Smart Fipa : Aquaterra - Développé par l'équipe Cachalot, composed by: Roland Dargelez, Frédéric Fréaud, Samuel Lepoil & Anne Sellès

=== 2016 ===
The 29th edition of Fipa took place in Biarritz from 19 to 24 January 2016.

==== Drama ====
- Fipa d'or: Birthday""5 by Roger Michell (United-Kingdom)
- Fipa d'or Best Actress: Marie Baümer in Brief an mein Leben (Germany)
- Fipa d'or Best Actor: Nicolas Rojas in Zamudio, perdidos en la noche (Chili)
- Fipa d'or Best Script: Viktor Oszkár Nagy & Petra Szöcs for Hivatal (Hungary)
- Fipa d'or Best Original Score: Alexander Balanescu & Ariel Sommer for The Scandalous Lady W (United-Kingdom)

==== Series ====
- Fipa d'or: Historia de un clan by Sebastián Ortega (Argentina)
- Fipa d'or Best Actor: Stellan Skarsgård in River (United-Kingdom, United-States)
- Fipa d'or Best Actress: Steinunn Ólína Þorsteinsdóttir in Case (Island)
- Fipa d'or Best Script: Lior Raz, Avi Issacharoff, Moshe Zonder, Michal Aviram, Asaf Beiser et Leora Kamenetsky pour Fauda (Israel)
- Fipa d'or Best Original Score: Luis Ortega & Daniel Melingo for Historia de un clan (Argentina)

==== Other formats ====
- Fipa d'or Documentary: Le Siège by Rémy Ourdan & Patrick Chauvel (France, Bosnia-Herzegovina)
- Fipa d'or Reportage and Investigation: La Bataille de Florange by Jean-Claude Poirson (France)
- Fipa d'or Performing Arts: Zpověď zapomenutého by Petr Vaclav (Czech Republic)
- Fipa d'or Smart Fipa: WEI or Die by Simon Bouisson (France)

==== Other awards ====
- Michel Mitrani Prize: Vue de l'esprit de Sébastien Simon & Forest Ian Etsler (France), Special distinction attributed to Villeneuve by Agathe Poche (France)
- Young Europeans Jury Prize: Burden of Peace by Joey Boink (The Netherlands)
- Prix Télérama: Loro di Napoli by Pierfrancesco Li Donni (Italy)
- Audience Award: Corée, nos soldats oubliés by Cédric Condon & Jean-Yves Le Naour
- EuroFipa of Honour: Dan Frank (France)
- Hackathon Prize Smart Fipa: Mnémésis - Developed by the Pharmakon team, composed by: Simon Bonnacie, Roland Dargelez, Doris Lanzmann, Julie Scheid & Éric Suard

=== 2015 ===
The 28th edition of Fipa took place in Biarritz from 20 to 25 January 2015.

==== Drama ====
- Fipa d'or : Marvellous by Julian Farino (United-Kingdom)
- Fipa d'or Best Actor: Juana Acosta in Sanctuaire (France)
- Fipa d'or Best Actress: Toby Jones in Marvellous (United-Kingdom)
- Fipa d'or Best Script: Pierre Erwan Guillaume, Olivier Masset-Depasse, Quitterie Duhurt-Gaussères, Xabi Molia for Sanctuaire (France)
- Fipa d'or Best Original Score: Matthias Weber, Paul Galister for Beautiful girl (Austria)

==== Series ====
- Fipa d'or: Happy Valley by Sally Wainwright, Euros Lyn & Tim Fywell (United-Kingdom)
- Fipa d'or Best Actor: Jurgen Delnaet in Marsman de Mathias Sercu (Belgium)
- Fipa d'or Best Actress: Marie Dompnier in Les Témoins d'Hervé Hadmar (France)
- Fipa d'or Best Script: Shelley Birse for The Code (Australia)
- Fipa d'or Best Original Score: Kristian Selin Eidnes Andersen for Kampen Om Tungtvannet (La Bataille de l'eau lourde) (Norway)

==== Other formats ====
- Fipa d'or Documentary: Pekka by Alexander Oey (The Netherlands)
- Fipa d'or Reportage and Investigation: Taïga by Hamid Sardar (France)
- Fipa d'or Performing Arts: Mia Oikgeniaki Ypothesi by Angeliki Aristomenopoulou (Greece)
- Fipa d'or Smart Fipa: Soundhunters by Nicolas Blies, Béryl Koltz, Marion Guth, François Le Gall, Stéphane Hueber-Blies (Luxembourg)

==== Other awards ====
- Michel Mitrani Prize: Marsman by Mathias Sercu (Belgium)
- Young Europeans Jury Prize: Peace on the Tigris by Takeharu Watai (Japan)
- Prix Télérama: Rwanda, la vie après – Paroles de mères by Benoît Dervaux & André Versaille (Belgium)
- Jérôme Minet Prize: Les Heures souterraines by Philippe Harel (France)
- Audience Award: Rwanda, la vie après - Paroles de mères de Benoît Dervaux et André Versaille (Belgium)
- EuroFipa of Honour: Chris Chibnall for Broadchurch and all of his career (United-Kingdom)
- Hackathon Prize of the Smart Fipa: Qu'est-ce qu'elle a ma gaule? - Developed by: Simon Falgaronne, Céline Ferret, Joris Fuluhea, Gabriel Grandjouan, Marie-Paule Jiccio & Arthur Martineau

=== 2014 ===
The 27th edition of Fipa took place in Biarritz from 21 to 24 January 2014.

==== Drama ====
- Fipa d'or: 3 x Manon by Jean-Xavier by Lestrade (France)
- Fipa d'or Best Actress: Emily Watson in The Politician's Husband (United-Kingdom)
- Fipa d'or Best Actor: Eduard Fernández in Barefoot on Red Soil (Spain)
- Fipa d'or Best Script: Britta Stöckle for Pass gut auf ihn auf (Germany)
- Fipa d'or Best Original Score: David Cervera for Barefoot on Red Soil (Spain)

==== Series ====
- Fipa d'or: Arvingerne by Pernilla August (Denmark)
- Fipa d'or Best Actress: Helen McCrory in Peaky Blinders (United-Kingdom)
- Fipa d'or Best Actor: Cillian Murphy in Peaky Blinders (United-Kingdom)
- Fipa d'or Best Script: Maya Ilsøe for Arvingerne (Danemark)
- Fipa d'or Best Original Score: Martin Phipps for Peaky Blinders (United-Kingdom)

==== Other formats ====
- Fipa d'or Documentary: Chante ton bac d'abord by David André (France)
- Fipa d'or Reportage and Investigation: Congo Business Case by Hans Bouma (The Netherlands)
- Fipa d'or Performing Arts: Colin Davis in His Own Words by John Bridcut (United-Kingdom)
- Smart Fipa: 1914, Dernières nouvelles by Bérénice Meinsohn (France)

==== Other awards ====
- Michel Mitrani Prize: Le Copain d'avant by Françoise-Renée Jamet & Laurent Marocco (France)
- Jury's Award: Bringing Tibet Home by Tenzin Tsetan Choklay (United-States)
- Prix Télérama: Art War by Marco Wilms (Germany)
- Jérôme Minet Prize: Des fleurs pour Algernon by Yves Angelo (France)

=== 2009 ===
The 22nd edition of Fipa took place in Biarritz from 20 to 25 January.

==== Drama ====
- Fipa d'or Grand Prize: Ihr könnt Euch niemals sicher sein
- Fipa d'or Best Actor: Baruch Brener – Brothers
- Fipa d'or Best Actress: Orna Fitoussi – Brothers
- Fipa d'or Best Original Soundtrack: Angélique Nachon and Jean-Claude Nachon – L'affaire Salengro
- Fipa d'or Best Screenplay: Eva Zahn and Volker A Zahn – Ihr könnt Euch niemals sicher sein
- Fipa d'argent Special Prize: Un homme d'honneur

==== Series and serials ====
- Fipa d'or Grand Prize: De smaak van De Keyser (a.k.a. The Emperor of Taste)
- Fipa d'or Best Actor: Pierre Verville – Les Lavigueur, la vraie histoire (a.k.a. The Lavigueurs, the True Story)
- Fipa d'or Best Actress: Marieke Dilles – De smaak van De Keyser (a.k.a. The Emperor of Taste)
- Fipa d'or Best Original Soundtrack: Wim De Wilde – De smaak van De Keyser (a.k.a. The Emperor of Taste)
- Fipa d'or Best Screenplay: Salvatore Mereu – Sonetaùla
- Fipa d'or Special Prize: Les Lavigueur, la vraie histoire (a.k.a. The Lavigueurs, the True Story)

== See also ==
- List of television festivals
