= Arntz =

Arntz is a surname. Notable people with the surname include:

- Gerd Arntz, German artist
- Marcel Arntz, Dutch cyclist
- Peter Arntz, Dutch footballer
- William Arntz, American director
