= Jaka Bizilj =

Slovenian film producer (born 1971)

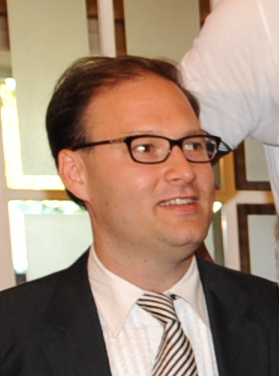
- Jaka Bizilj in 2009
- Born: 8 December 1971 (age 54); Ljubljana, SR Slovenia, Yugloslavia
- Education: University of Mainz
- Occupations: Writer; promoter; film producer
- Years active: 1995–present

Jaka Bizilj (born 8 December 1971) is a German writer, promoter and film producer. He is the founder of the Cinema for Peace Foundation.

== Early life and education ==
Bizilj was born in Ljubljana, then part of Slovenia, Yugoslavia. He grew up in Slovenia, Libya, Tanzania, Malaysia, and Germany. He studied politics, literature, and film at the German University of Mainz. He then became a journalist and political activist.

== Career ==
=== Promoter and producer ===
Since 1995, Bizilj has organized concerts with artists such as Andrea Bocelli, Bryan Adams, Montserrat Caballe, and Liza Minnelli, and toured with artists such as José Carreras. Since the late 1990s, he has worked internationally as a producer. His company has organized concerts and live productions, including those featuring film music from films such as "Harry Potter", "Lord of the Rings","The Hobbit", "Star Trek", and the music of Hans Zimmer. Other productions have included: "Magic of the Dance", Andrew Lloyd Webber's "Jesus Christ Superstar" and "Evita", Elton John's musical Aida and the Broadway musical Jekyll & Hyde.

In 2002, he founded the Cinema for Peace initiative, and in 2008 the non-profit Cinema for Peace Foundation itself, with the stated aim of raising awareness of the social relevance of films and the influence of movies on the perception and resolution of global social, political, and humanitarian challenges.

Through Cinema for Peace, Bizilj has been involved in the production of films, including the Richard Curtis remake "Suddenly Gina" and the documentary "Letter to Anna" about Russian journalist Anna Politkovskaya. He was also involved in the documentary "This Prison Where I Live" about the detained Myanmar comedian Zarganar and the film production "After the Silence". He also raised funds for the development of the film Song of Names with Dustin Hoffman and Anthony Hopkins.

The World Forum

In 2024, Jaka Bizilj started The World Forum on the Future of Democracy, AI/Tech and Humankind, an annual forum organised with Cinema for Peace in Berlin, which convenes heads of state, Nobel laureates, scientists, dissidents, philosophers and artists on democratic resilience, human rights and the governance of artificial intelligence. Many panels are followed by a "law-making workshop" intended to produce blueprint legislation for use by governments.

The World Forum — 2024 edition

The inaugural World Forum was held on 18–19 February 2024 in Berlin. It was inaugurated by figures including the 8th UN Secretary-General Ban Ki-moon, Live Aid founder Bob Geldof, actress Sharon Stone, Nobel Peace Prize laureate Oleksandra Matviichuk, and concluded with an address by former U.S. Secretary of State Hillary Clinton at the Theater des Westens.

The World Forum — 2025 edition

The second edition took place on 18–19 March 2025 and gathered more than 200 participants across some fifty panel discussions. Contributors included Pope Francis, former U.S. President Bill Clinton, Hillary Clinton, Taiwanese President Lai Ching-te, Nobel laureates Maria Ressa and Oleksandra Matviichuk, AI-godfather Yoshua Bengio and Russian opposition figure Vladimir Kara-Murza. At the accompanying Democracy Gala, the Guardians of Democracy award was presented to Kara-Murza and Maria Ressa, with further honours to longevity scientist David Sinclair and entrepreneur Richard Branson.

The World Forum — 2026 edition

The third edition was held on 15–17 February 2026 under honorary chairwoman Hillary Clinton, with contributions from Speaker Emerita Nancy Pelosi, philosopher Yuval Noah Harari, WHO Director-General Tedros Adhanom Ghebreyesus, heads of state, Nobel Peace laureates and fifty of the world's dissidents. The Cinema for Peace and Democracy Gala on 16 February, presented by Bob Geldof, presented the Cinema for Peace Doves and the Noble Prize for Guardians of Democracy.

=== Charity ===
Bizilj distributed the Bosnian Oscar-winning war-satire "No Man's Land" by Danis Tanovic.

In 2010, the Cinema for Peace Foundation presented the first Justitia Award to honor the United Nations and UN Secretary-General Ban Ki-moon for establishing and supporting the International Criminal Court. The award was presented to Ban Ki-moon by Council of Europe Goodwill Ambassador Bianca Jagger.

On 8 June 2010, Bizilj hosted the "Sports for Peace" gala during the FIFA World Cup in South Africa, the first FIFA World Cup to take place in Africa. The event brought together figures including Ban Ki-moon, South African President Jacob Zuma, Madama Graça Machel, representatives of the Nelson Mandela Foundation, and 1Goal Ambassadors to address the second Millennium Development Goal (MDG): "achieve universal primary education by 2015".

In 2011, he organized a Cinema for Peace Dinner in Cannes for the first time. He also organized a film program and charity dinner to accompany the visit of the 14th Dalai Lama to Wiesbaden, supporting Tibetan culture.

In January 2012, Bizilj produced the Los Angeles Cinema for Peace premiere, staging "Help Haiti Home" in support of Sean Penn's J/P Haitian Relief Organization. In June 2012, an event hosted by Bizilj titled "Art & Cinema for Peace" on the occasion of the Art Basel fair gathered 100 personalities from the world of arts, film, and society in honor of Chinese artist Ai Weiwei. This occasion included the premiere of the documentary film "Ai Weiwei - Never Sorry" by Alison Klayman.

Through Cinema for Peace, Bizilj organized Alexei Navalny's airlift from Russia in 2020 after Navalny's poisoning.

== Productions ==
Entertainment / Shows

- since 1996 - The Black Gospel Singers
- since 1997 - Nabucco, Aida
- since 1998 - Carmen
- since 1999 - Magic of the Dance
- since 2000 - Romanza with Helen Schneider, Königstein Castle Festival, Nahe-Festival (until 2005)
- since 2001 - Stardance, Dancing Queen/Abbafever
- since 2002 - Evita
- since 2003 - The Vienna Johann Strauss Waltz Gala, Festival under the Stars (Herrenchiemsee Castle)
- since 2004 - The Magic Flute, Jedermann
- since 2005 - Last Night of Spectacular Classic, Arena di Bavaria, Wörthersee Festival
- 2006 - The World Football Concerts at the FIFA World Cup, Jesus Christ Superstar, Galanacht des Musicals, Mozart Gala
- 2007 - The Lord of the Rings in concert, Queen - a ballet homage by Ben van Cauwenberg
- 2008 - Aida, the musical by Elton John and Tim Rice
- 2009 - Jekyll & Hyde
- 2011 - Phantom of the Opera Birthday Gala at the O2 World in Berlin, The Fantastic Shadows
- 2012 - The Fantastic Shadows
- 2015 – Herr der Ringe and comeback concert of Al Bano and Romina Power at Waldbühne Berlin
- since 2016 - The Wall Museum at East Side Gallery in Berlin
- 2018/2019 - Der Herr der Ringe & Der Hobbit in concert with Pippin Billy Boyd and others
- 2018/2019 - The Music of Hans Zimmer & others
- 2018/2019 - The Music of Der König der Löwen
- 2020 - The Magical Music of Harry Potter - live in concert

Advocacy Events

- since 2002 - Annual Cinema for Peace Gala in Berlin
- 2005 - Long Walk to Justice / Live 8 Germany
- 2008 - Sports for Peace Campaign at the Summer Olympics in Beijing
- 2009 - Cinema for Peace Dinner Honoring Mikhail Gorbachev on the occasion of the 20th anniversary of the fall of the Berlin Wall
- 2010 - A Special Evening on Justice at the Review Conference of the Rome Statute in Kampala, Uganda
- 2010 – Sports for Peace Gala Event South Africa
- 2010 - Art & Cinema for Peace Dinner at the 41 Art Basel
- 2010 - Special Youth Day Screening of "Themba - A Boy Called Hope" at Cape Town, presented by Desmond Tutu, starting the anti-AIDS-film-campaign
- 2010 - An Evening for Africa in New York with Bob Geldof and Sharon Stone
- 2010 - Green Evening in Berlin with Sebastian Copeland and Orlando Bloom
- 2011 – Cinema for Peace Honorary Dinner Cannes with Sean Penn, Leonardo DiCaprio, Robert De Niro, Uma Thurman, Jane Fonda
- 2011 – Cinema for Peace Dinner and film symposium honoring Hans-Dietrich Genscher in Ljubljana
- 2011 – Cinema for Peace Welcome Dinner in St.Tropez
- 2011 – Cinema for Peace Dinner for Tibet, screenings, symposium, and speeches on the occasion of the visit of His Holiness the 14 Dalai Lama to Wiesbaden
- 2011 - Cinema for Peace Evening on the Issue of Child Soldiers and petition in The Hague at the International Criminal Court
- 2011 – Cinema for Peace Dinner in New York celebrating the presentation of the first universal human rights logo
- 2011 - Justice Gala in New York staged together with the Office of the Prosecutor of the International Criminal Court
- 2012 - Cinema for Peace Los Angeles – Help Haiti Home
- 2012 – Art & Cinema for Peace Art Basel in support of Ai Weiwei
- 2012 – In the Name of Justice - Farewell Event for Luis Moreno-Ocampo at the International Criminal Court
- 2012 – "Sports for Peace" London honoring Muhammad Ali and celebrating his core values on the occasion of the Olympic Games
- 2012 – Cinema for Peace Dinner New York – Artists help Development and Climate Protection, honoring Sting and Trudie Styler
- 2013 – Cinema for Peace Gala for Humanity, Los Angeles
- 2013 - Cinema for Peace Dinner Honoring UN Women, Berlin
- 2013 – Humanitarian travel to Aleppo, Syria for BILD
- 2014 – Cinema for Peace Heroes Dinner on the occasion of 25 years Fall of the Wall with Mikhail Gorbachev and Miklos Nemeth
- 2014 – Cinema for Peace Symposium in Berlin to avoid a new Cold War (with the New Policy Forum)
- 2014 – Visit of the Olympic Games in Sochi with members of Pussy Riot
- 2015 - Cinema for Peace Real Life Heroes Award for Amelia Boynton Robinson
- 2016 – Life vest installation with Ai Weiwei at Konzerthaus Berlin on the occasion of Cinema for Peace Berlin
- 2019 – Act of Gratitude for Mikhail Gorbachev of German civil society and Federal Presidents on the occasion of 30 years Fall of the Wall
- 2020 – Censored Ai Weiwei Film Festival in Berlin
- 2024 - Sports for Peace Berlin
- 2024 - Sports for Peace Paris

== Film productions ==
- Not the same procedure as every year - Dinner for All with Bob Geldof and Katja Riemann (2007)
- Suddenly Gina with Iris Berben, Julia Jentsch, Jan Josef Liefers and Catherine Deneuve (2007)
- I don't feel like dancing short film (2008)
- Eric Bergkraut's documentary Letter to Anna about the murdered Russian journalist Anna Politkovskaya (2008)
- This Prison Where I Live, co-production for Rex Bloomstein's documentary about the Burmese comedian "Zarganar"(2010)
- Steuer Gegen Armut - Eine gute Idee, producer of the German spot of the Robin-Hood-Tax-Campaign, following an idea of Richard Curtis (2010)
- After the Silence, co-production for Marcus Vetter's documentary (2011)
- The Song of Names, co-production for Vadim Perelman's feature film, starring Anthony Hopkins and Dustin Hoffman (2012)
- The Voices of Srebrenica, director (2015)

== Awards ==
- In 2008, Václav Havel, the former Czech president, presented the audience award for "Letter to Anna" at the One World International Human Rights Film Festival in Prague. The festival features international documentary films highlighting human rights issues.
- "I Don't Feel Like Dancing" received the award "Best Short Feature" by the "GoEast Festival" in April 2008.
- Global Green Award 2018
- Pope Francis honour 2024. In 2024, Cinema for Peace presented its Cinema for Peace Award to Pope Francis at the Vatican in recognition of his humanitarian efforts during the war in Ukraine.
