= Clouds (2000 film) =

- Directed by: Don Thompson
- Written by: Don Thompson
- Produced by: William Arntz
- Cinematography: Gary Lindsay
- Edited by: Gary Lindsay
- Music by: Nawang Khechog
- Production companies: Pacific Groove Productions nextPix
- Distributed by: In Pictures
- Release date: September 5, 2000
- Running time: 95 minutes
- Country: United States
- Language: English

Clouds is a 2000 film written and directed by Don Thompson and produced by Will Arntz.

== Synopsis ==
Clouds tells the story of a physicist (Michael Patrick Gaffney) trying to come to terms with the cosmos, and ultimately understanding that love must be a part of any complete description of the universe.

== Cast ==
- Michael Patrick Gaffney as Robert St. John, the physicist.
- Jennifer Jordan Day as Beatrice, his love interest
- Richard Barrows as Tab
- Rob Nilsson as Frank
- Patricia Ann Rubens as Mrs. Martin

== Reception ==
While the New York Times reviewer was dismissive of the film Film Threat said:

Though Clouds is not a perfect film, the actors make most of the more stilted dialog work, and even the slowest paced moments feature nicely composed visuals from DP Gary Lindsay. By the time we come to the final message “go and love some more” (effectively appropriated from Harold and Maude) it’s apparent that the film is just a good, solid effort with an intriguing plot, and an impressive directorial debut for Thompson.

Despite these mixed reviews, Clouds was awarded the "Feature Film Award" at the 1999 New York International Independent Film and Video Festival and the "Premio Nuovo" at the 1999 Brooklyn International Film Festival. The film was re-released for its 25th anniversary, and received recognition and awards from numerous film festivals.
