= GhettoPhysics =

- Directed by: William Arntz; E. Raymond Brown
- Written by: William Arntz; E. Raymond Brown
- Produced by: Scott Altomare; William Arntz; E. Raymond Brown
- Starring: Mike Foy; Sabrina Revelle; Nina Daniels
- Music by: Ryan Michael Demaree
- Production company: Ghetto Physics 101 Productions
- Distributed by: Captured Light; Samuel Goldwyn Films
- Release date: 8 October 2010
- Country: United States
- Language: English
- Budget: $500,000
- Box office: $10,200

GhettoPhysics: Will the Real Pimps and Hos Please Stand Up! is a 2010 docudrama film written and directed by William Arntz and E. Raymond Brown. The film is based on Brown's 2003 book, Will The Real Pimps and Hos Please Stand Up! — Peeping the Multi-leveled Global Game. The book and the film examine the interplay between Pimps and "Hos" and how that dynamic is the oldest and simplest expression of the ways in which power is wielded in today's world. The film uses documentary footage, animation, satire and dramatization to illustrate examples culled from the "hood" to Wall Street. Whether the players are real-life pimps or corporate executives, they are all playing the “game” and repeating the same power dynamics.

On the decision to utilize the Pimp/Ho metaphor for the film, Arntz and Brown explain, "We don’t normally refer to power interactions in say, politics or economics as a game. But this is exactly what is taking place. GhettoPhysics helps you become more aware of it and play it from a position of personal power."

== Synopsis ==
The basic tenet of GhettoPhysics is that the Pimp/Ho game is the fundamental expression of how people interact in the world. But this interaction is so multilayered and can become so complex that it is hard to see the game. However, by looking at the world using the Pimp/Ho dynamic, it becomes very easy to see the manipulations that keep society's Hos forever in debt, disempowered or marching off to war, while society’s Pimps remain rich, powerful, and in control.

The film includes interviews with notable entertainers and thinkers such as Dr. Cornel West, Ice-T, Norman Lear, Cynthia McKinney, KRS-One, John Perkins (author), Byron Katie, Too Short, and William Arntz. It also includes a colorful contingent of street characters, with names such as Fillmore Slim, Candy, Hook da Crook, Loreal, Mac Breed and Lo Da Show.

The Pimp/Ho dynamic is not limited to the streets of the inner city ghettos, but extends throughout all aspects of today’s society from government to business, religion and education. Analyzing real world issues such as the global economic crisis, the Gulf oil spill, global ecological threats, healthcare reform and war, GhettoPhysics details the street world and then moves to the classroom and the corporate boardroom to illustrate how the game is being played every day.

== Reception ==
The San Jose Mercury News called the movie's material "engrossing" but said the presentation was "stiff and stagy." Superconciousness Magazine called the movie an "irreverent, cagerattling, cinematic jewel."
