= Sports for Peace =

Sports for Peace is a politically independent initiative based in Berlin, Germany. Sports for Peace was created during the preliminary stages of the Olympic Games in 2008, in order to address the rising question of whether sports or major sporting events could foster common ideals. In Sports for Peace, athletes from all over the world come together to promote the values of sports, such as fair play, tolerance, and the Olympic ideals of freedom, international and intercultural understanding.

== Projects ==
=== 2008 ===
The Sports for Peace organization published, in cooperation with Amnesty International and the International Campaign for Tibet, an ad in the International Herald Tribune which accompanied the start of the 2008 Beijing Olympic Games. More than 100 sportsmen from all over the world signed an open letter to the Chinese government expressing their desire not only to see a successful sports festival in Beijing, but also to call for respect concerning Olympic ideals and basic human rights.

=== 2009 ===
During the 12th IAAF World Championships in Athletics, held in 2009 in Berlin, "Sports for Peace" celebrated its official inauguration with legends of the sport world. The "Sport for Peace" Awards of 2009 were presented to those the organization deemed as exemplary persons who filled their spot as role models in the sporting world. Some award winners include IOC Vice President Sergej Bubka, who has been investing in the sports association of his hometown Donetsk for several years, lending children and young sports talents such as Yelena Isinbayeva a place to practice their craft. In his acceptance speech, he stated: "I feel honored, because this prize represents the full recognition of the work that my colleagues and I have been doing so far". Dr. Edwin Moses, a "Sports for Peace" award winner, renowned worldwide ambassador for sports ethics, and chairperson of the Laureus World of Sport Academy, responded to his prize in a similar way, stating: "I am receiving this award in the name of my colleagues at Laureus Sports Foundation. Everywhere in the world we need social involvement and that is why I wholeheartedly welcome the 'Sports for Peace' initiative". The Iranian National Football team has also received an award from the organization for wearing green wristbands in their game against South Korea to express their solidarity with the movement toward freedom and democracy in Iran.

=== 2010 ===
In cooperation with the United Nations, "Sports for Peace" staged a gala event during the FIFA World Cup in South Africa on June 8, 2010, in Johannesburg at Constitution Hill. This venue is the home of the Constitutional Court and represents the protector of South African basic rights and freedoms. The site currently holds Johannesburg's Old Fort Prison complex, where political leaders such as Nelson Mandela and Mahatma Gandhi were formerly detained.

The gala event became a part of the United Nations MDG advocacy campaign, which looks to bring people together in order to raise awareness of the United Nations' Millennium Development Goal No. 2: Achieve Universal Primary Education by 2015. Former President of South Africa and Nobel Prize winner Nelson Mandela has endorsed and supported the initiative. Roughly 400 recognized personalities from the fields of sports, economics, culture and media attended the event. The UN also launched the official MDG song performed by 8 African musicians and music groups including the Soweto Gospel Choir.

Part of the advocacy campaign featured a week of free public film screenings featuring peace and development topics, and talks/panel discussions by actors and directors in cooperation with the Cinema for Peace Foundation. Films that were screened included Invictus with Morgan Freeman.

"Sports for Peace" events were planned for the FIFA Women's World Cup 2011 in Germany and the 2012 Olympic Games in London.

== See also ==
- Right to Play
