= Summer '04 =

- Theatrical release poster
- Directed by: Stefan Krohmer
- Written by: Daniel Nocke
- Produced by: Katrin Schlösser
- Starring: Martina Gedeck; Robert Seeliger; Svea Lohde
- Cinematography: Patrick Orth
- Edited by: Gisela Zick
- Music by: Ellen McIlwaine
- Production company: Ö-Filmproduktion
- Distributed by: Alamode Film (Germany)
- Release dates: 20 May 2006 (France); 19 October 2006 (Germany)
- Running time: 97 minutes
- Country: Germany
- Language: German
- Box office: $632,017 (worldwide)

Summer '04 (German: Sommer '04 an der Schlei) is a 2006 German drama film directed by Stefan Krohmer and starring Martina Gedeck, Robert Seeliger, and Svea Lohde. Written by Daniel Nocke, the film is about a middle-aged woman coming to terms with her son's sexual awakening and who ends up involved in some extramarital exploration of her own. The film was presented at the 2006 Cannes Film Festival, the 2006 Toronto International Film Festival, and the 2007 Berlin International Film Festival.

== Plot ==
Miriam Franz has just turned forty and is starting a seaside vacation with her husband André and fifteen-year-old son Nils on the Schlei, a narrow inlet of the Baltic Sea in Schleswig-Holstein in northern Germany. André has given Niels permission to bring his twelve-year-old girlfriend Livia along for the trip. Miriam is concerned they may take their relationship to a physical level, but André seems unconcerned.

One day, Nils and Livia go sailing, but Nils returns alone saying that Livia is still sailing with a man they met, Bill Ginger, an American of German heritage. Bill brings Livia home and seems quite taken with her, and vice versa. Miriam is concerned by Bill's flirtation with the underage girl, finding it "a little weird"; André is unimpressed with Bill's fawning compliments. Soon Livia is spending all her time with Bill, while Nils sits at home watching war documentaries.

When Livia fails to come home one night, Miriam, feeling responsible for her summer guest, drives to Bill's home to confront them about their inappropriate behavior. When she arrives, Bill casually tells Miriam that Livia went for a walk after an argument. While they wait, Bill admits how much he's enjoyed his time and conversations with Livia, after his years in America where all talk is about "money and stupidity." He assures Miriam that he knows "when to stop" with the young girl. When Livia finally returns, Miriam drives her home and learns that Livia was disappointed that they didn't have sex.

The next day, Miriam, André, and Livia join Bill for a day of sailing; Miriam and Bill take the C55 catamaran, while André and Livia take the sailboat Bénéteou. During a break from sailing, Miriam expresses interest in Bill's sex life, and as they relax on a beach she starts to seduce him, but he resists her advances. The next day, while Nils and Livia are out sailing, Miriam drives to Bill's house and they have sex. Afterwards, they see Livia waiting downstairs—apparently having heard their lovemaking.

In the coming days, the family spends time at a fair and visits the Landesmuseum at the Gottorf Castle to visit the bog people exhibit. The relationship between André and Nils continues to grow strained. Miriam returns to Bill's house and they have sex again. Afterwards, Bill breaks off their relationship, saying he is in love with Livia. The next day, Miriam and Livia are out sailing when Livia is struck in the head by the main sail boom. Livia says she is okay, and they continue sailing. Miriam informs Livia she can no longer see Bill. When Livia says she's tired and asks to turn back, Miriam dismisses her, thinking she just wants to meet Bill. Later, Livia says she feels sick and collapses, hitting her head again.

Miriam returns to shore and brings Livia to the hospital, where she dies. At home, Nils asks his father why he lied about the timing of the incident, noting if Miriam had turned back earlier, Livia would still be alive. After Nils leaves, Miriam tells André that their son is right—that when Livia was initially struck, they were still fairly close to shore. That night, Miriam packs her things and André drops her off at Bill's house. Initially, Bill does not want to see her, but later they talk about Livia. After Miriam confesses there is no one she'd rather be with, they have sex.

A few years later, Miriam and Bill, who are now a couple, visit with Livia's mother and her new suitor in Germany. Miriam and Bill left Germany in 2004 and have been living in the United States and traveling. Livia's mother reads them a letter her daughter wrote to a friend in August 2004. In the letter, Livia mentions how Miriam and her husband do not belong together, and she thinks Miriam and Bill would make a good match. She thinks she can help bring them together, to be "the happiest couple in the world." Livia's mother asks them if they are now indeed happy, and Miriam says, "Yes, we're very happy."

== Cast ==
- Martina Gedeck as Miriam Franz
- Robert Seeliger as Bill Ginger
- Svea Lohde as Livia
- Peter Davor as André Franz
- Lucas Kotaranin as Nils
- Nicole Marischka as Grietje
- Gábor Altorjay as Daniel
- Michael Benthin as Arzt

== Production ==
=== Filming locations ===
- Schleswig, Schleswig-Holstein, Germany
- Schlei, Schleswig-Holstein, Germany

== Reception ==
=== Critical response ===
Upon its release, Summer '04 received generally positive reviews in the United States and Europe. In his review in The New York Times, Matt Zoller Seitz wrote, "Mr. Krohmer's film is distinguished by very long takes, ominous cutaways to undulating river reeds, near-somnambulist underplaying by a first-rate cast and nail-on-the-head dialogue about materialism, hypocrisy, morality and mortality."

In his review in the Los Angeles Times, Kenneth Turan wrote, "Director Krohmer creates a fine sense of erotic tension, and actress Gedeck provides more than enough emotional resonance. This is one tricky film, but it stays with you nevertheless." Turnan concluded:

It's an unusual drama, one grounded in the difficulty inherent in intimate relationships, in attempting to read and assess the behavior of others. The unpredictability of its plot demands considerable suspension of disbelief, but if you stick it out to the unforeseen conclusion, the rewards are there.

In her review in The Village Voice, Michelle Orange wrote, "Elements of L'Avventura, Swimming Pool, and even A Place in the Sun materialize in the film's sophisticated layering of theme and counter-theme, and Gedeck in particular successfully invests her lightly defiant sensuality in this thorough and thoroughly engaging investigation of age (and entitlement) before beauty."

In his review in Salon.com, Andrew O'Hehir applauded Martina Gedeck's "tremendous" performance and called the film a "well-crafted and deceptively leisurely film, with a heart of ice."

In his review in the New York Observer, Andrew Sarris called Summer '04 a "marvelous German film" with a "warmly stirring romantic maelstrom of five multigenerational libidos let loose at a lakeside vacation site." Sarris concluded:

The surprise ending amounts to one of the most heart-rendingly brilliant coups in directing, writing and acting I have ever experienced on the screen. Like only a few endings I can recall, it makes you rethink everything you have seen before, and weep a little inwardly. The performances are all right-on, but Ms. Gedeck reaches new heights even for her, after her previous triumphs in Sandra Nettelbeck’s Mostly Martha (2001) and Florian Henckel von Donnersmarck’s The Lives of Others (2006).

In his review in Slant Magazine, Ed Gonzalez gave the film three of four stars and wrote that the film "exudes the fleeting quality of a summer breeze, exploring with unpretentious candor—and very little skin—how a young girl's sexual agency rebukes an older generation's notions of right and wrong."

The film received an 80% positive rating from top film critics based on 20 reviews.

=== Box office ===
Summer '04 did not do well at the box office, earning only $632,017 in total worldwide gross sales. In the United States, the film was released in only two theaters, generating $20,474 in gross domestic revenue.

== Awards and nominations ==
- 2006 Cannes Film Festival Film Presented
- 2006 Toronto International Film Festival Film Presented
- 2007 Berlin International Film Festival Film Presented
- 2007 Karlovy Vary International Film Festival Film Presented
