= Two Catalonias =

2018 documentary film

- Directed by: Álvaro Longoria; Gerardo Olivares
- Starring: Luis María Ansón; Inés Arrimadas; Elsa Artadi
- Distributed by: Netflix
- Release date: September 28, 2018
- Running time: 116 minutes
- Country: Spain
- Languages: Spanish, Catalan, English

Two Catalonias (Dos Cataluñas or Dues Catalunyes) is a 2018 documentary film directed by Álvaro Longoria and Gerardo Olivares, about the ideological differences surrounding the 2017 Catalan regional election in Spain. The film was released by Netflix on September 28, 2018.

== Premise ==
The documentary follows the ideological differences surrounding the 2017 Catalan regional election in Spain through interviews and behind-the-door conversations. It covers the societal dynamics in the country resulting in a push for sovereignty with parliamentary declaration of independence, and aftermath following it.

== Reception ==
The film won the 2019 Cinema for Peace Award for Justice. However Catalonian ex-president Carles Puigdemont attended the award gala and gave a speech denouncing the trial of Catalonia independence leaders, Longoria returned the award after the ceremony due to what they felt was the politicization of the ceremony. Olivares did not attend the gala, knowing that Puigdemont would be in attendance.

The LA Review of Books review suggested that Two Catalonias "seems to trade a thorough engagement with historical specificity for international appeal", and the headline in El Diario that it was a film for tourists.

Decider's US reviewer, found it "a vital and necessary document about current events that should be seen by anyone who feels so inclined", despite finding it disorientating due to its fragmentary coverage of the Catalan independence movement. Ready Steady Cut, which awarded it 3/5 stars, also found it "occasionally confounding".
