= Del Sol Press =

Del Sol Press is a publishing company founded by Michael Neff in 2002. The first book published by them was a revision of Michael Brodsky's 1978 novel, Detour. Since that time Del Sol Press has gone on to publish work by Nin Andrews, David Blair, Joan Houlihan, Ander Monson, Don Thompson, Walter Cummins, and Thomas Kennedy, among others.

Del Sol Press seeks to publish work by both new and recognized writers, as well as republish literary works that have gone out of print. DSP also publishes literary SFF novels, among them, Mall by Pattie Palmer-Baker, Piper Robbin and the American Oz Maker by Warwick Gleeson, Die Back by Richard Hacker, and Karma City by Gardner Browning. An earlier SFF from 2017, War of the World Makers by Reilly Michaels, won three national book awards.
