= Jigme Gyatso =

Jigme Gyatso (aka Golog Jigme)
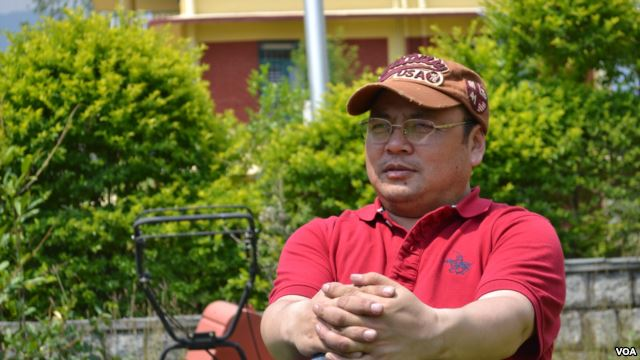
- Other names: Golog Jigme
- Occupations: independence activist, filmmaker
- Known for: Leaving Fear Behind, 2008 arrest

Jigme Gyatso (aka Golog Jigme) is a Tibetan filmmaker and human rights activist. After assisting with the documentary Leaving Fear Behind, he was arrested by Chinese authorities on at least three occasions. He alleges that he was tortured following his March 2008 arrest.

Alternative names for him include Golog Jigme (Chinese: 果洛久美; pinyin: Guǒluò Jiǔměi) or Jigme Lobsang (Chinese: 晋美罗藏; pinyin: Jìnměi Luōzàng) and his secular birth name Lotra (Chinese: 罗扎; pinyin: Luōzhā).

== Leaving Fear Behind ==
In 2007 and 2008, Jigme Gyatso assisted Tibetan filmmaker Dhondup Wangchen in the making of Leaving Fear Behind, a documentary film which interviewed Tibetan people on their opinions of the Dalai Lama and the Chinese government in the months preceding the 2008 Beijing Olympics. In March, they had completed filming and just smuggled the tapes out of Lhasa, the Tibetan capital, when riots erupted and began to spread through Tibetan-inhabited areas of China. As part of the government response that followed, both Jigme Gyatso and Dhondup Wangchen were detained on March 28 in Tong De, Qinghai Province.

The 25-minute documentary constructed from Dhondup Wangchen and Jigme Gyatso's footage showed ethnic Tibetans criticizing the choice of China to host the 2008 Summer Olympics, praising the Dalai Lama, and expressing dislike of ethnic Han migrants. The result was described by The New York Times as "an unadorned indictment of the Chinese government". It was compiled from 40 hours of interview footage shot by a single camera. The documentary premiered on the opening day of the Olympics and was clandestinely screened for foreign reporters in Beijing.

== Later trials and arrests ==
Dhondup Wangchen was later sentenced to six years' imprisonment, a sentence he was still serving as of January 2010. Jigme Gyatso was sentenced to seven months in Linxia prison, during which time he later stated that he was tortured by prison authorities. Front Line, The Committee to Protect Journalists, and the Tibetan Center for Human Rights and Democracy issued statements in support of Jigme Gyatso. He returned to his monastery on 2 May 2009.

On 5 November 2012 Jigme Gyatso was arrested by the Gansu Public Security Department on arriving in Hezuo from Lanzhou.
