= Tenzin Tsetan Choklay =

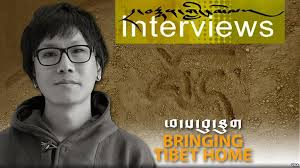
Tenzin Tsetan Choklay

Tenzin Tsetan Choklay is a Tibetan filmmaker.

He was born to Tibetan refugees in India, and was raised in Dharamshala where he was a student at Tibetan Children's Village. He then graduated at Punjab University in Chandigarh, and moved to Bombay where his interest in studying film materialized and later joined the Academy of Film and Television, Delhi.

In 2005, he was awarded a scholarship at the Busan International Film Festival to study at the Korean Academy of Film Arts, one of South Korea's premiere film schools.

He graduated from the Korean Academy of Film Arts in 2008. Since 2009, lived and worked in Delhi, and then in New York city. He realized number of short films in South Korea and was an Associate Producer at White Crane Films in India, in particular for The Sun Behind the Clouds by Ritu Sarin and Tenzing Sonam.

His documentary film Bringing Tibet Home, featuring the Tibetan artist and childhood friend of him Tenzing Rigdol, won the award of Jury des jeunes Européens at the Festival International de Programmes Audiovisuels in January 2014.

In August 2014, he received the 'Emerging Director' Award at the Asian American International Film Festival in New York.
