= Right to Play =

International non-profit organization

- Founded: 2000
- Founder: Johann Olav Koss
- Location: Toronto, Ontario, Canada
- Origins: Olympic Aid
- Key people: Jessie Thomson (CEO)
- Website: www.righttoplay.com

Right to Play is an international non-profit organization whose mission is to use play to empower vulnerable children to overcome the effects of war, poverty, and disease. Right to Play's work is connected to the UN's Sustainable Development Goals, and focuses on four outcome areas: quality education, children's health and well-being, girls' empowerment, and child protection. Headquartered in Toronto, Canada, the organization has programs in 15 countries across Africa, Asia, the Middle East, and has national offices in Canada, Germany, Norway, the Netherlands, Switzerland, the United Kingdom, and the United States.

== History ==
Right to Play was founded by Olympic speed skater Johann Olav Koss. Koss had been working as an ambassador raising awareness and funds for Olympic Aid since 1994. In 2000, he incorporated Right to Play, marking its transition from "fundraising vehicle" to a non-profit to directly implement programs benefitting children.

Over time, Right to Play has shifted from sport for development programs to play-based learning. It has also expanded form offering programs directly to collaborating with governments and educational institutions to create systemic change at national scales.

=== Timeline ===
Sources:

- 2000: Right to Play is founded by Olympic speed skater Johann Olav Koss to build on charitable work he had been conducting since an Olympic Aid trip to Eritrea in 1994.
- 2001: Right to Play's first programs were launched in Angola and Cote D'Ivoire in partnership with the UN High Commissioner for Refugees.
- 2010: Indigenous leaders propose a partnership with Right to Play to provide extracurricular programs for Indigenous children and youth in Canada. Right to Play currently collaborates with more than 70 Indigenous communities on its Indigenous programming.
- 2013: Right to Play begins supporting child refugees from the Syrian Civil War in Jordan and Lebanon.
- 2018: Right to Play, as part of a global NGO coalition, advocates at the G7 Summit for a global pledge of CAD$2.9 billion towards girls’ education.
- 2019: A coalition of nonprofits and civil society groups in Mozambique, led by Right to Play, successfully repeals a decree that forced pregnant girls and new mothers to drop out of regular schooling and attend night classes.
- 2020: Right to Play works with governments and schools to provide remote learning opportunities to children affected by the COVID-19 pandemic.

== Involvement with the Olympic Games ==
In October 2008, the International Olympic Committee (IOC) and the Vancouver Organizing Committee for the 2010 Olympic and Paralympic Winter Games (VANOC) announced that Right to Play would be banned from an official role at the 2010 Winter Olympics in Vancouver. The two committees cited sponsorship conflicts as the reason behind the ban, identifying Right to Play sponsors such as Canon, Scotiabank, and Mitsubishi as competitors to Olympic sponsors Kodak, Royal Bank of Canada, and General Motors. Right to Play had been present in an official role at every Summer and Winter Olympics since 2004, and since 1994 as Olympic Aid.

== See also ==
- Sports for Peace
