= Tibet in Song =

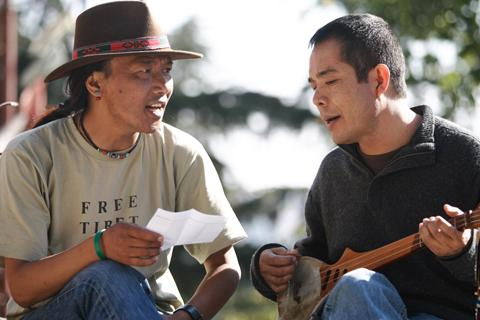
- Ngawang Choephel (right) and a friend prepare a traditional song for 'Tibet in Song'.
- Directed by: Ngawang Choephel
- Written by: Ngawang Choephel and Tara Steele
- Produced by: Ngawang Choephel
- Edited by: Tim Bartlett
- Production company: Guge Productions
- Distributed by: New Yorker Films
- Release dates: January 18, 2009 (Sundance); September 24, 2010 (United States)
- Running time: 86 minutes
- Country: United States
- Languages: English; Tibetan

Tibet in Song is a 2009 documentary film written, produced, and directed by Ngawang Choephel. The film celebrates traditional Tibetan folk music while depicting the past fifty years of Chinese rule in Tibet, including Ngawang's experience as a political prisoner. The film premiered at the 2009 Sundance Film Festival, where it won the Special Jury Prize for World Cinema. It opened in theatres on September 24, 2010 in New York City.

== Synopsis ==
Tibet in Song tells the story of Ngawang Choephel, a Tibetan exile and former Fulbright scholar at Middlebury College, who returns to Tibet in 1995 to videotape traditional music and dance. The films follows his travels throughout the country recording music and understanding the impact of Chinese communist rule on Tibetan culture and everyday life. The movie contends that the Chinese authorities re-purposed traditional Tibetan music to forward their own agenda and propaganda.

== Production ==
Two months into the trip, after he'd sent a batch of material back to friends in India, Chinese intelligence agents arrested Choephel and confiscated his camera, notes, and videotape. He was convicted of spying, without a trial, and sentenced to 18 years in prison. While in prison he continued his research, transcribing songs from prisoners and eventually memorizing songs after his notes were confiscated. His mother launched a tireless campaign for his freedom, and in January 2002, he was released.

== Reception ==
The film received positive reviews from critics and the Tibetan community in exile. On January 24, 2009 the film was awarded the Special Jury Prize for World Cinema at the Sundance Film Festival and Ngawang Choephel became the first Tibetan to win an award at Sundance.

== Accolades ==
- Cinema for Peace, International Human Rights Award, 2010
- Sundance Film Festival, World Cinema Special Jury Prize, 2009

== See also ==
List of TV and films critical of Chinese Communist Party
