= Dhondup Wangchen =

Tibetan filmmaker (born 1974)

- དོན་གྲུབ་དབང་ཆེན་
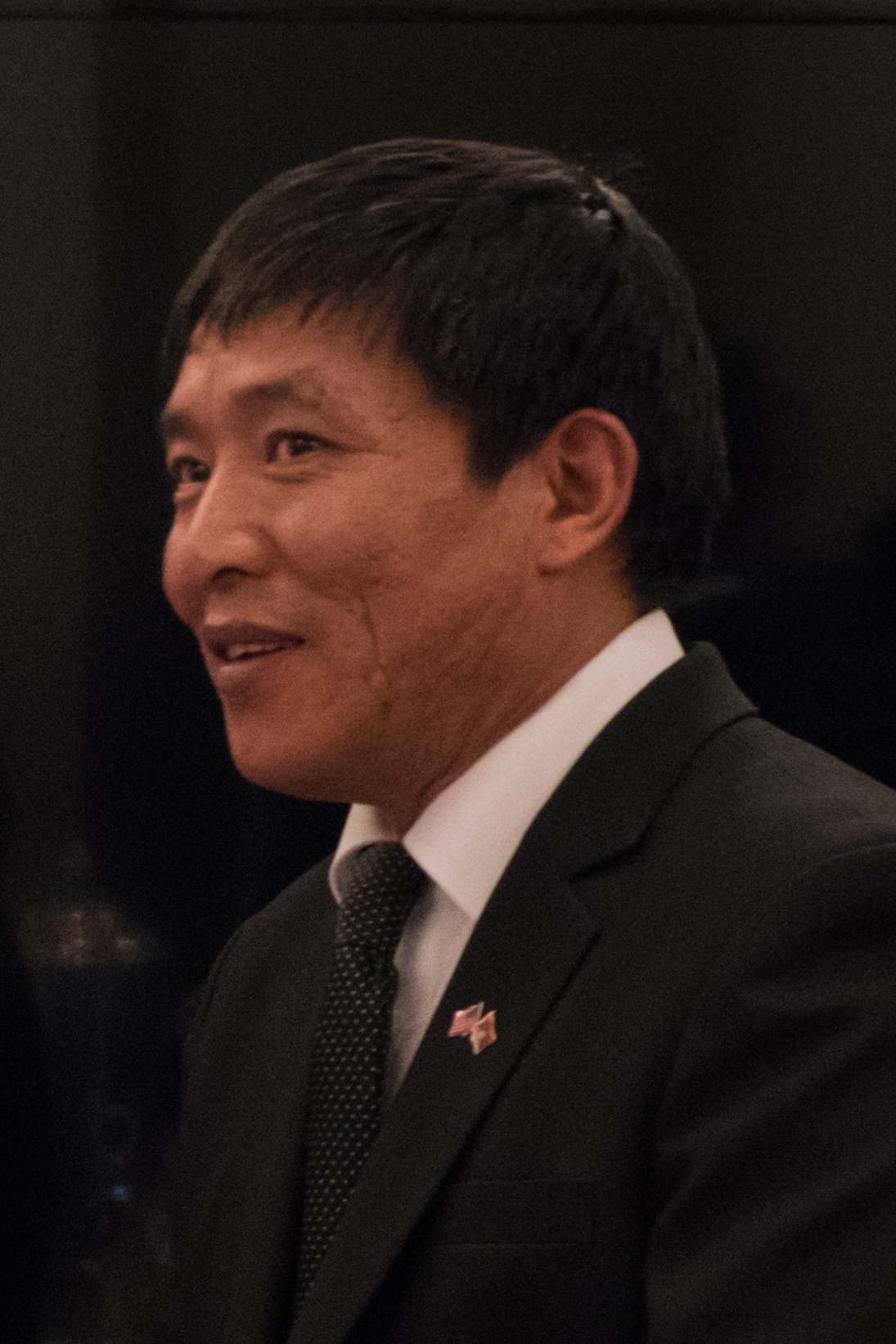
- Dhondup Wangchen in 2018
- Born: 17 October 1974 (age 52); Hualong Hui Autonomous County, Qinghai, China
- Occupation: Filmmaker
- Known for: Leaving Fear Behind; 2008 arrest
- Spouse: Lhamo Tso
- Children: 4
- Awards: CPJ International Press Freedom Award (2012); Václav Havel Prize for Creative Dissent (2014)

Dhondup Wangchen (Standard Tibetan: དོན་གྲུབ་དབང་ཆེན་, Wylie: don grub dbang chen; born 17 October 1974) is a Tibetan filmmaker who had been imprisoned by the Chinese government in 2008 on charges related to his documentary Leaving Fear Behind. Made with senior Tibetan monk Jigme Gyatso, the documentary consists of interviews with ordinary Tibetan people discussing the 14th Dalai Lama, the Chinese government, the 2008 Beijing Olympics, and Han Chinese migrants to the region. After smuggling the tapes of the interviews out of Tibet, however, Dhondup Wangchen and Jigme Gyatso were detained during the 2008 Tibetan unrest.

Dhondup Wangchen was sentenced to six years' imprisonment for subversion. Numerous international human rights organizations protested his detention, including Amnesty International, which named him a prisoner of conscience. In 2012, he was awarded the International Press Freedom Award of the US-based Committee to Protect Journalists.

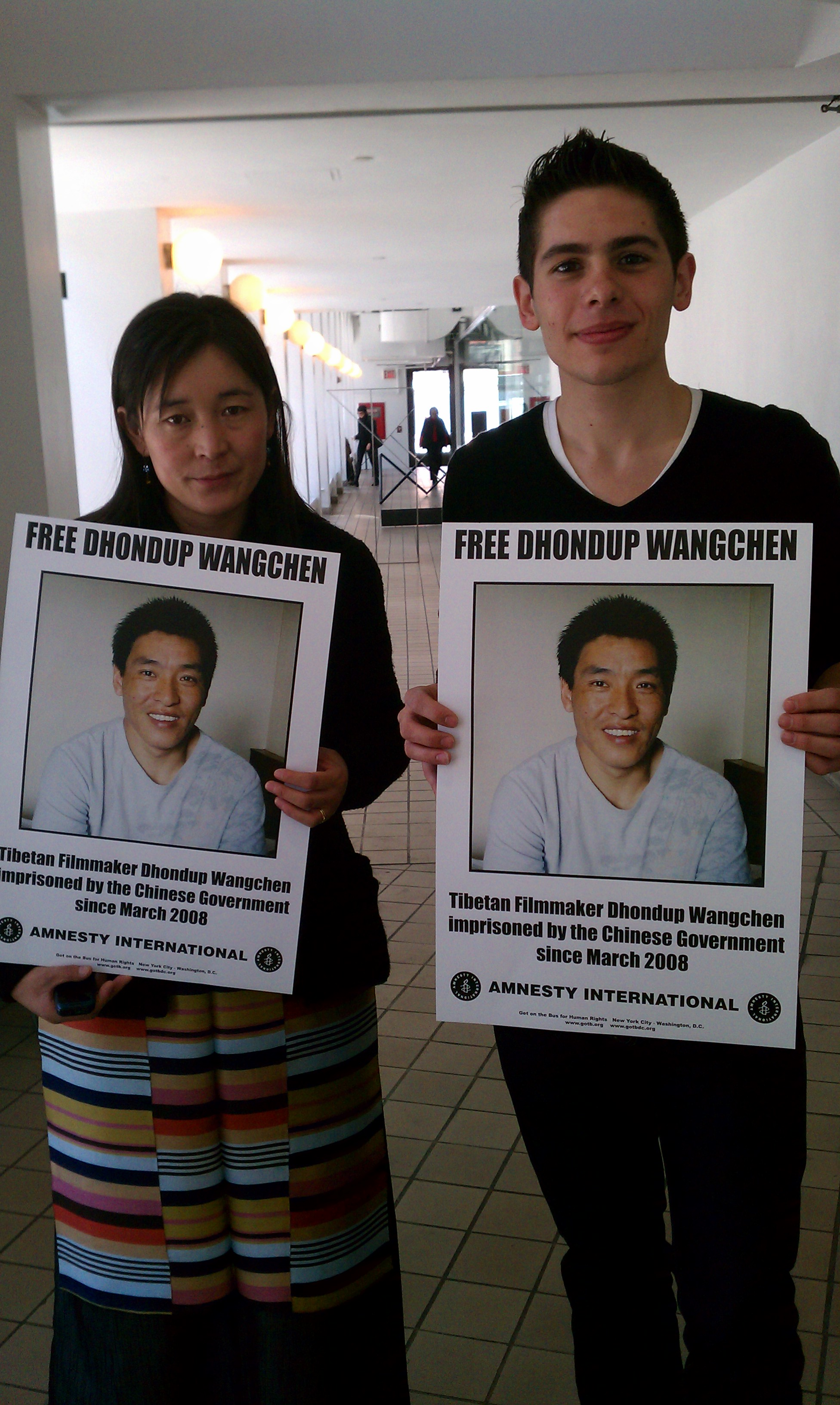
Dhondup Wangchen's wife Lhamo Tso (left) protesting on his behalf

He served his full six-year sentence and was released from prison on 5 June 2014. In December 2017 Wangchen escaped from China to the United States, arriving in San Francisco on 25 December, where his wife and children live, having been granted political asylum in the United States in 2012.

== Early life ==
Dhondup Wangchen was born in 1974, in Bayen in the Tsoshar region of Qinghai province (formerly part of Amdo, Tibet). His family were farmers. He later moved to the capital of Lhasa. There Dhondup Wangchen witnessed a pro-independence demonstration repressed by security authorities, an experience that a relative would later describe as critical to his "political awareness". In 1993, he and a cousin crossed the Himalayas into India to receive the blessing of Tibet's exiled spiritual leader, the Dalai Lama. Dhondup returned to Tibet shortly after to act as an activist for the Tibetan cause.

== Leaving Fear Behind ==
In 2007, Dhondup Wangchen and friend Jigme Gyatso, a senior Tibetan monk, conceived of a documentary interviewing ordinary Tibetan people on their views of the Dalai Lama and the Chinese government in the year leading up to the 2008 Beijing Olympics. (Note: Tibet was annexed by the People's Republic of China in 1950 after occupation by the Chinese People's Liberation Army. Currently governed as an autonomous region, Tibet's political status remains controversial.) The documentary was to be called Leaving Fear Behind. The pair coordinated their efforts with Dhondup Wangchen's cousin Gyaljong Tsetrin, who remained in Switzerland. In preparation for likely reprisals by the Chinese government, Dhondup Wangchen moved his wife, Llamo Tso, and their four children to Dharamsala, India.

Between August 2007 to March 2008, Dhondup Wangchen and Jigme Gyatso gathered interviews from 108 Tibetan individuals discussing the political situation, all of whom agreed to have their faces shown on camera. The pair gathered 40 hours of interview footage shot by a single camera. They had completed filming and just smuggled the tapes out of Lhasa, the Tibetan capital, when riots erupted and began to spread through Tibetan-majority areas of China. As part of the government response that followed, both Jigme Gyatso and Dhondup Wangchen were detained on 28 March in Tong De, Qinghai Province.

The footage was taken to Switzerland, where colleagues at Dhondup Wangchen's production company, Filming for Tibet, assembled it into Leaving Fear Behind. The 25-minute documentary constructed from Dhondup Wangchen and Jigme Gyatso's footage showed ethnic Tibetans criticizing the choice of China to host the 2008 Summer Olympics, praising the Dalai Lama, and expressing dislike of ethnic Han migrants. The result was described by The New York Times as "an unadorned indictment of the Chinese government". Dhondup Wangchen states in the documentary that "My aim for this film is not to make a famous or particularly entertaining film. This film is about the plight of the Tibetan people—helpless and frustrated." The film premiered on the opening day of the Olympics and was clandestinely screened for foreign reporters in Beijing.

== Trial and imprisonment ==
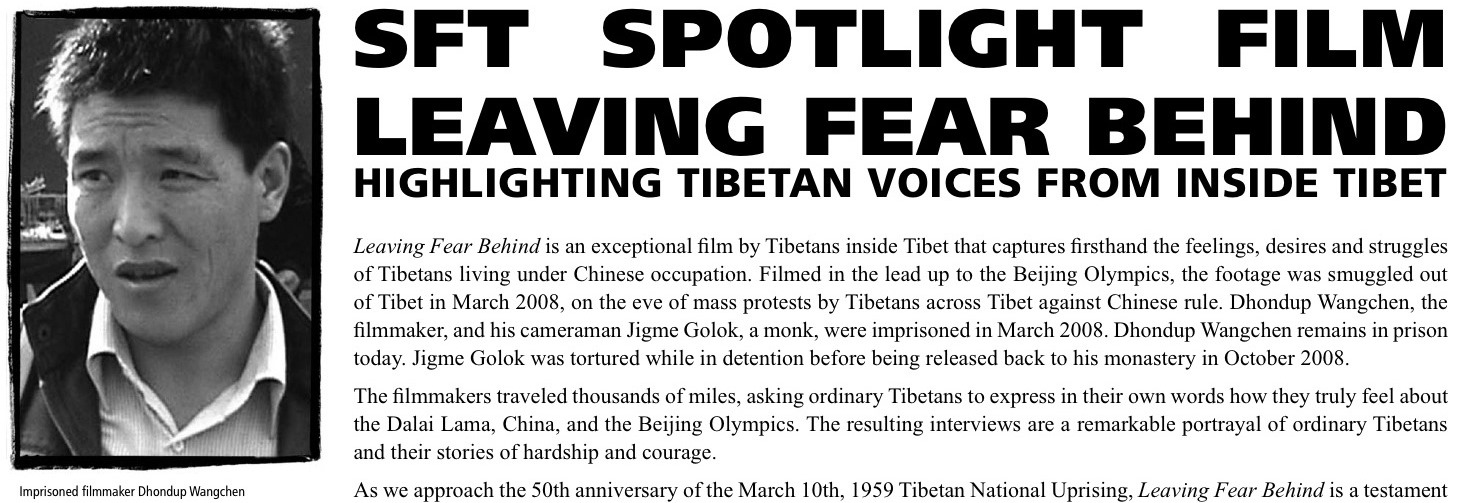
Students for a Free Tibet spotlight Political Prisoner Dhondup Wangchen's Film "Leaving Fear Behind" to Highlight Tibetan Voices from Inside Tibet

Following Dhondup Wangchen's March 2008 arrest, he was held for several days in unofficial detention at Gonshang Hotel. Amnesty International reported that while there, Chinese security forces beat him and deprived him of food, water, and sleep.

He was later moved to Xining City No. 1 Detention Centre, where he was held incommunicado until April 2009, when he was allowed to meet with his lawyer, Li Dunyong. Three months later, however, Li Dunyong dropped his case, reporting that he had been ordered to do so by judicial authorities. Another lawyer was reportedly threatened with the closing of his law firm if he chose to defend Dhondup Wangchen.

On 28 December 2009, Dhondup Wangchen was sentenced to six year's imprisonment for subversion, following a secret trial in Xining. On 7 January 2010, Filming for Tibet reported that he had been unable to appeal his sentence because he had been denied access to his lawyer until his right to appeal expired.

His family stated that he has contracted hepatitis B while imprisoned, and his health was said to be failing. In April 2010, he was transferred to Xichuan Labour Camp in Qinghai Province, where prisoners' work reportedly includes the manufacture of bricks, concrete, and aluminum-alloy windows. On 6 April 2012, Amnesty International issued another appeal on Wangchen's behalf warning that he was being denied needed medical treatment.

== International response ==
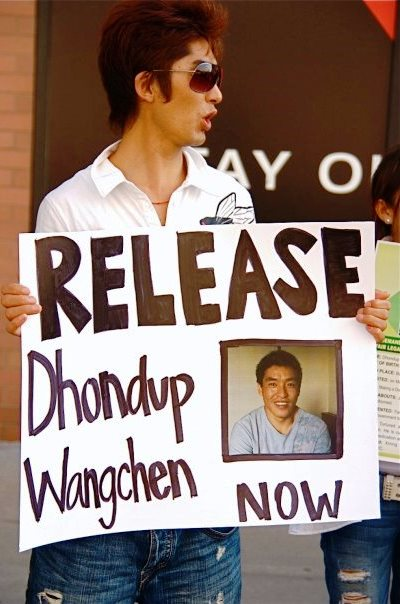
A New York City protest on behalf of Dhondup Wangchen

Jigme Gyatso and Dhondup Wangchen's arrests were condemned by numerous human rights groups. Amnesty International protested the arrests of both men, noting Jigme Gyatso to be at risk of further torture and naming Dhondup Wangchen a prisoner of conscience. Human Rights Watch, Front Line, The Committee to Protect Journalists, Reporters Without Borders, and the Tibetan Center for Human Rights and Democracy also advocated on Dhondup Wangchen's behalf. Blogging from under house arrest in Beijing, Tsering Woeser wrote in 2010, "In fact, we are living in a country where the spiritual has already been undermined, when someone like Dhondup Wangchen who has been the conscience of mankind is consigned to a dark prison, I am afraid the future of this country will sink into hatred and brutality."

On 10 March 2011, former Speaker of the United States House of Representatives Nancy Pelosi called for Dhondup Wangchen's release in honor of Tibetan Uprising Day. (Note: Tibetan Uprising Day commemorates the anniversary of the Tibetan uprising against Chinese rule which began on 10 March 1959.) Also in early 2011, Boston's American Repertory Theater and System of a Down's Serj Tankian dedicated their production of Prometheus Bound to him and seven other activists, stating in program notes that "by singing the story of Prometheus, the God who defied the tyrant Zeus by giving the human race both fire and art, this production hopes to give a voice to those currently being silenced or endangered by modern-day oppressors".

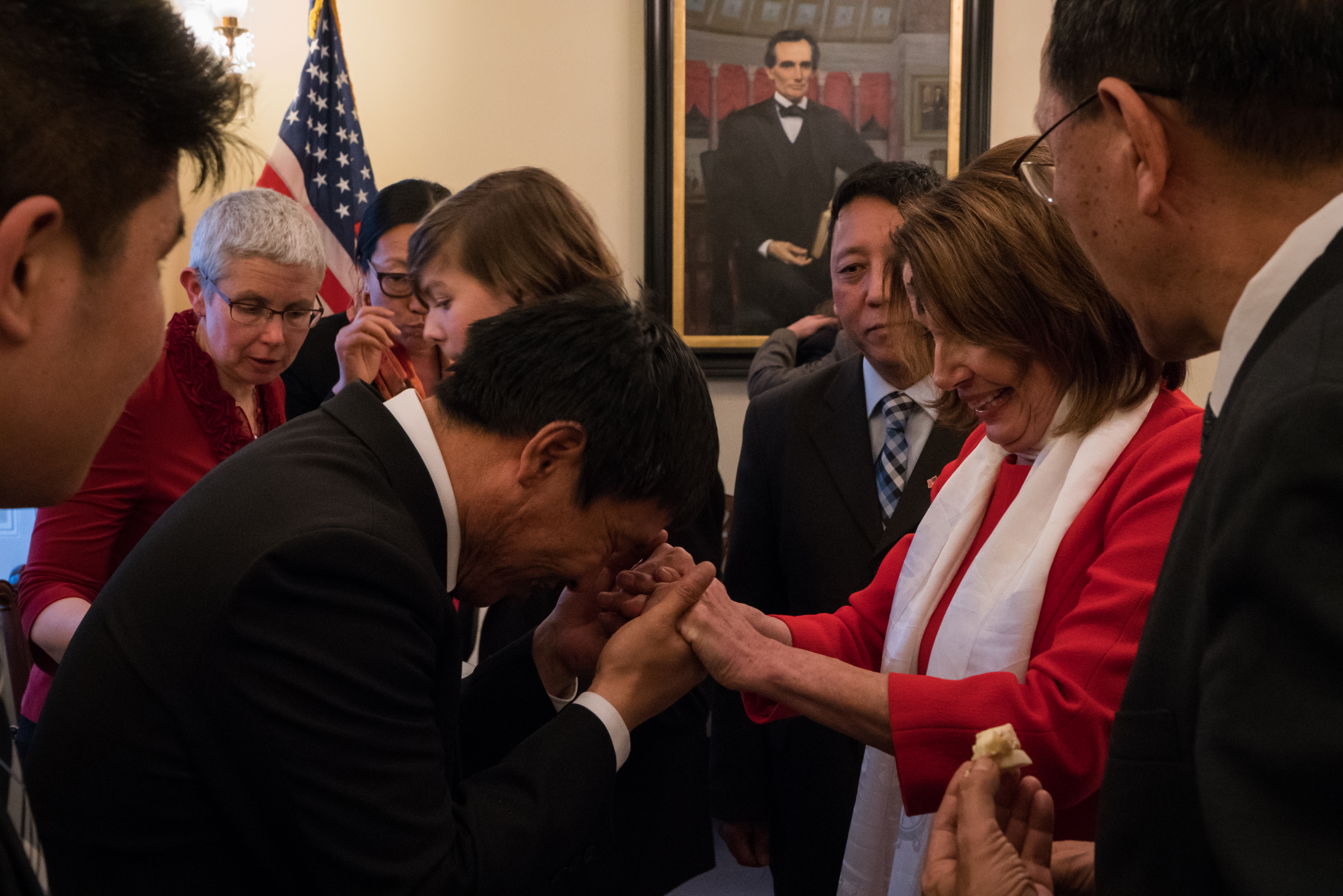
Dhondup Wangchen with Nancy Pelosi in 2018

A coalition of human rights and Tibetan activist groups calling for Dhondup Wangchen's release held a rally in New York City's Times Square on 9 March 2012, the day before Tibetan Uprising Day. Speakers included Dhondup Wangchen's wife Lhamo Tso as well as poet-activist Tenzin Tsundue. Excerpts from Leaving Fear Behind were shown on a twelve-foot video screen beneath the Xinhua Jumbotron.

In 2012, Dhondup Wangchen won the International Press Freedom Award of the Committee to Protect Journalists. The award recognizes journalists who show courage in defending press freedom despite facing attacks, threats, or imprisonment. He was honored in absentia at the organization's November 2012 banquet due to his ongoing imprisonment.

In 2014, he received the Václav Havel Prize for Creative Dissent.

== Later life ==
He served his full six-year sentence and was released from prison on 5 June 2014.

In December 2017 Wangchen escaped from China to the United States, arriving in San Francisco on 25 December, where his wife and children live, having been granted political asylum in the United States in 2012.

== See also ==
- Tibetan independence movement
