= Daniel Nocke =

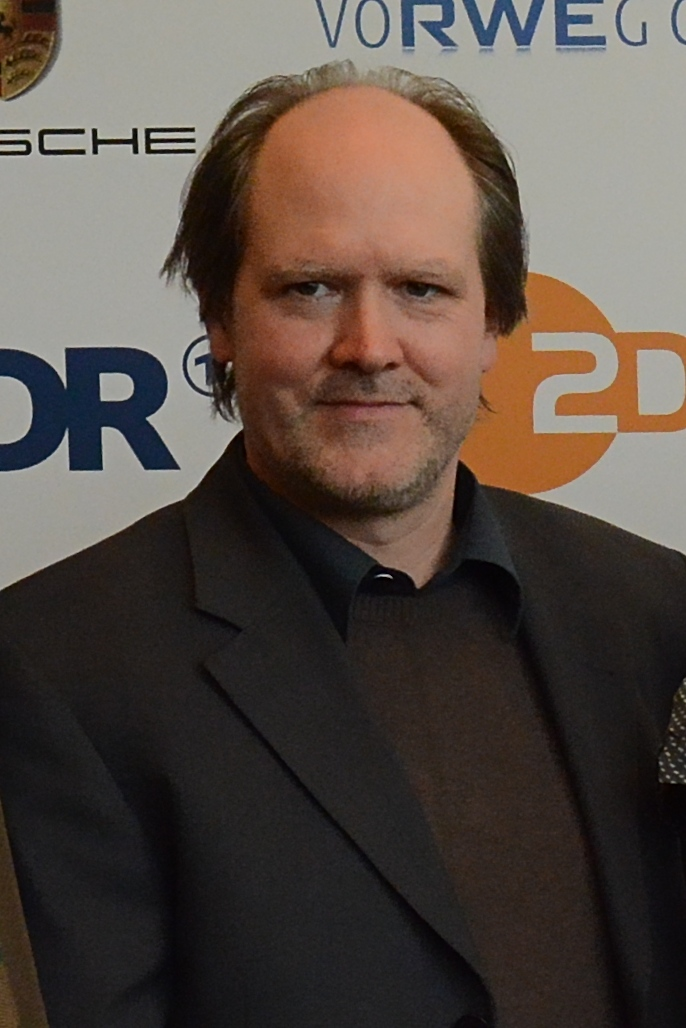
Daniel Nocke 2014

Daniel Nocke is a German screenwriter for film and television, and a director of animated shorts. He frequently works with director Stefan Krohmer on live action projects. His films have been shown at German and American film festivals and his animations have been featured on the American public television series The Short List.

== Early life and education ==
Nocke was born in Hamburg in 1968. he studied screenwriting and animation at the Filmakademie Baden-Württemberg. He has taught screenwriting for animation there as a visiting lecturer since 1999.

== Career ==
=== Work with Stefan Krohmer ===
Nocke met Krohmer at film school and wrote their graduation film, Barracuda Dancing (1999). It won the German Television Award for best newcomer.

Their television film Ende der Saison won the Grimme-Preis in Gold in 2002. Familienkreise (2003) won the same award in 2004. Their first cinema film, Sie haben Knut (2003), is a satire about the 1980s peace movement. Nocke won the German Film Critics' award for best screenplay for it. Their second cinema film, Summer '04 (2006), was shown at the Directors' Fortnight in Cannes and at the Berlinale.

== Filmography ==
=== Screenwriter ===
- Macht man eigentlich anders (1998, TV short)
- Barracuda Dancing (1999, TV movie)
- Celebrity Deathmatch Hits Germany (2001, TV series, Episode #1.1)
- Ende der Saison (2001, TV movie)
- They've Got Knut (2003)
- Familienkreise (2003, TV movie)
- Scheidungsopfer Mann (2004, TV movie)
- A Dead Brother (2005, TV movie)
- Silver Wedding (2006, TV movie)
- Summer '04 (2006)
- Duel at Night (2007, TV movie)
- Die Katze (2007, TV movie)
- Mitte 30 (2007, TV movie)
- Abducted (2009, TV movie)
- Dutschke (2009, TV movie)
- The Lost Father (2010, TV movie)
- Die fremde Familie (2011, TV movie)
- Tatort (2010–2011, TV series, Das Dorf, Borowski und der vierte Mann)

=== Director and screenwriter ===
- Der Peitschenmeister (1998, TV movie)
- Die Trösterkrise (1999)
- The Modern Cyclops (2002, short)
- No Room for Gerold (2006, short)
- 12 Jahre (2010, short)
