= Nicu's Spoon Theater Company =

Theatre company in New York City

Nicu's Spoon is an inclusion-oriented off-off-Broadway theater company in New York City. The company works with actors regardless of age, ability, gender, color or ethnicity and seeks to challenge stereotypes and expectations. Nicu's Spoon was the first fully inclusive company in New York City. Nicu's Spoon are also co-founders of the Disability in Cinema Coalition (DCC).

== Productions ==
Nicu's Spoon productions began in 2001 with the original work Displaced, and was followed with a 2002 production of To Kill a Mockingbird. Others works include Eric Overmyer's In Perpetuity Throughout the Universe; Nineteen Eighty-Four; Mac Wellman's Murder of Crows; Eric Bogosian's subUrbia; a play adaptation of Ordinary People by Nancy Gilsenan (from the book by Judith Guest); Elizabeth Egloff's The Swan; a play adaptation of Le Petit Prince by Ric Cummins and John Scoullar; Mark Medoff's Stumps; Gary Henderson's Skin Tight; Ken Duncum's Cherish; Buried Child; Constance Congdon's Tales of the Lost Formicans, Shakespeare's Richard III in 2007 and 2015, and Elizabeth Rex, which after its run moved to New York's Center Stage in August 2008 for a one-month limited Off-Broadway engagement; Peter Barnes' Red Noses in 2015, and Maxwell Anderson's The Bad Seed.

They have presented world premieres of original works, A Kite Cut Loose in the Middle of the Sky as well as over forty-five new plays in their years of their new plays reading series. They produced the Vagina Monologues in Hawaii at the University of Hilo in 2019, and two virtual plays The Importance of Being Earnest and Dancing at Llughnasa in 2020.

== Documentary ==
In 2013 and 2014 they were followed for six months for a documentary film produced by The School of Visual Arts in NYC, called Two and Twenty Troubles.

== Awards ==
The company was the recipient of the 2006 Thom Fluellen Award from the New York University Community Fund for "excellence in programming for the diverse city of New York". It also won a 2004 OOBR award for its production of subUrbia, and a 2008 Snapple/Mayor of NY City Award, as well as a 2008 NY Innovative Theatre Award and a 2015 NY Innovative Theater Award.

== Artistic director ==
Stephanie Barton-Farcas (born Stephanie Melissa French) is the artistic director. She has worked extensively in theater in Los Angeles and New York City and was the co-founder of Nicu's Spoon Theater Company in 2001. She has more than twenty years experience as an actress. Barton-Farcas began her theatrical career as a child actor in the Pacific Northwest, later studying at CalArts and getting a BFA in Theatre. She acted in Los Angeles in both theatre and film before taking an eight-year hiatus when she lived and worked in Central and Eastern Europe. After returning to the United States, she began to work in theatre and film in New York and founded Nicu's Spoon Theatre in 2001.

She sits on the board of Nicu's Spoon as well as on the board of Identity Theater Company in NYC. She has guest lectured on Inclusion in the Arts for many universities as well as groups including Accessibility New York and the United States Institute for Theatre Technology (USITT).

As artistic director of Nicu's Spoon Theatre Company, she has received a range of reviews. The 2007 production of Richard III with its double-casting of the lead role was called "a disjointed production" by The New York Sun but also hailed for the convention "it worked particularly well here."

Her written work is often on the subject of inclusive theatre, including Disability & Theatre: A Practical Manual for Inclusion in the Arts and Acting & Auditioning for the 21st Century. as well as being a contributor to "Applied Theatre with Youth, Education, Engagement, Activism" by Routledge Press in 2021, authoring the chapter on youth with disabilities.

"Theatre practitioners such as Stephanie Barton-Farcas demonstrate inclusion and accommodation reflecting the social model through the ways in which they take responsibility for providing accessible materials and physical space, and how they value differences as strengths in a diverse world".
