= Coronation (2020 film) =

2020 documentary film directed by Ai Weiwei

- Promotional release poster
- Directed by: Ai Weiwei
- Produced by: Ai Weiwei
- Release date: August 21, 2020
- Language: Mandarin

Coronation is a 2020 documentary film directed by Chinese activist Ai Weiwei. The film documents happenings in the city of Wuhan, China during the global COVID-19 pandemic, and how the country's government and citizens have responded to and been impacted by the outbreak. Ai directed the film remotely from Europe, with dozens of volunteers and paid crews covertly gathering footage inside hospitals, homes, and quarantine zones across China.

== Production ==
Ai, who lives in Europe, remotely directed dozens of volunteers and paid crews across China who gathered the footage used in Coronation. In a telephone interview with The New York Times, Ai stated the most difficult footage to obtain was footage of inside intensive care units. He said that much of this footage was gathered using handheld video cameras roughly the size of smartphones. He also stated that he amassed nearly 500 hours of footage, which he and a team edited down to about two hours in length.

== Release ==
In August 2020, the film was made available internationally on the Vimeo on Demand streaming service, and on Alamo on Demand in the United States. Ai stated he had hoped to screen the documentary at a film festival, but that the New York Film Festival, Toronto International Film Festival, and Venice Film Festival, after initially expressing interest, declined to show the film. Ai also said that Amazon and Netflix rejected the film, and he suggested that the documentary was turned down by the aforementioned festivals and companies in order for them to maintain business relationships in China. A Netflix spokesperson responded by stating that Netflix is producing its own documentary about COVID-19, and a press officer for the New York Film Festival wrote in an email that "we want to emphasize that political pressures do not and have never played a role in the festival's curatorial selection."

== See also ==
- Impact of the COVID-19 pandemic on cinema
