= Leaving Fear Behind =

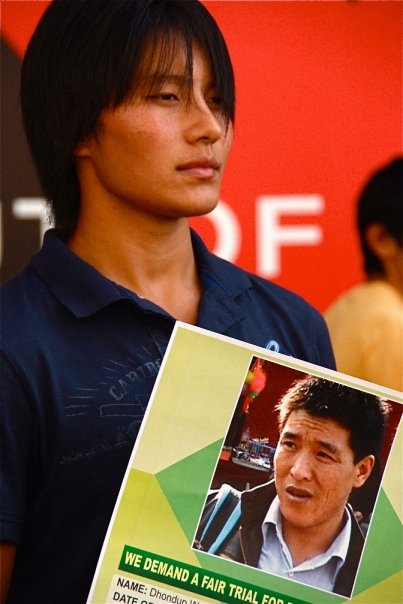
- Demonstration in New York
- Jigdrel
- Directed by: Dhondup Wangchen
- Written by: Dhondup Wangchen
- Release date: August 5, 2008
- Running time: 25 minutes
- Country: China

Leaving Fear Behind, also known as Leaving Fear behind: I Won't Regret to Die (in Tibetan language Jigdrel), is a documentary movie from Dhondup Wangchen and Jigme Gyatso about communist Chinese repression of Tibet. It was premiered in 2008 in the year when the 2008 Summer Olympics took place in Beijing, China.

== Production ==
In 2006, Dhondup Wangchen and friend Jigme Gyatso, a senior Tibetan monk, conceived of a documentary interviewing ordinary Tibetan people on their views of the Dalai Lama and the Chinese government in the year leading up to the 2008 Beijing Olympics. The documentary was to be called Leaving Fear Behind. The pair coordinated their efforts with a Dhondup Wangchen's cousin Gyaljong Tsetrin, who remained in Switzerland. In preparation for likely reprisals by the Chinese government, Dhondup Wangchen moved his wife, Lhamo Tso, and their four children to Dharamsala, India. and the Tibetan Center for Human Rights and Democracy

Between August 2007 to March 2008, Dhondup Wangchen and Jigme Gyatso gathered interviews from 108 Tibetan individuals discussing the political situation, all of whom agreed to have their faces shown on camera. They had completed filming and just smuggled the tapes out of Lhasa, the Tibetan capital, when riots erupted and began to spread through Tibetan-majority areas of China. As part of the government response that followed, both Jigme Gyatso and Dhondup Wangchen were detained on March 28 in Tongde, Qinghai Province.

== Reception ==
The 25-minute documentary resulting from Dhondup Wangchen and Jigme Gyatso's footage was described by The New York Times as "an unadorned indictment of the Chinese government". The film was compiled from 40 hours of interview footage shot by a single camera. The documentary premiered on the opening day of the Olympics and was clandestinely screened for foreign reporters in Beijing.

On 9 March 2012, the 53rd anniversary of the 1959 Tibetan uprising, a coalition of human rights and Tibetan activist groups calling for Dhondup Wangchen's release held a rally in New York City's Times Square; excerpts from Leaving Fear Behind were shown there on a twelve-foot video screen beneath the Xinhua Jumbotron.

== See also ==
- 2008 Lhasa violence
