= Ngawang Choephel =

Tibetan film director

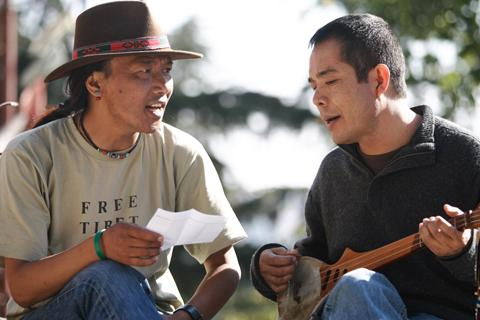
- Ngawang Choephel (right) and a friend, prepare a traditional song for 'Tibet in Song.'
- Born: 1966 (age 59–60); Tibet, China
- Occupations: Documentary filmmaker, director, producer
- Notable work: Tibet in Song

Ngawang Choephel is a documentary filmmaker, director, producer, and musician.

== Early life ==
Choephel was born in western Tibet in 1966. When he was two years old, he and his mother fled the hardships of Chinese occupation and sought refuge in India. They settled in a Tibetan settlement in Southern India, where Choephel grew up. He attended the Central School for Tibetans-CST until the age of 15. In 1992, he graduated from the Tibetan Institute of Performing Arts-TIPA in Dharamshala, India.

== Career ==
Prior to filmmaking, Choephel was a music teacher in Tibetan schools in India, where he taught Tibetan folk music to hundreds of children from exile communities. He released his first album called Melody in Exile with a student of his.

His passion for music garnered him a Fulbright scholarship in 1993 to study international music and filmmaking at Middlebury College in Vermont, United States. He is also a recipient of Middlebury College's Honorary Doctor of Arts Degree, Peace Abbey's Courage of Conscience Award, Lobsang Wangyal's Best Act in Exile Award, and is a Sundance Institute Fellow.

== Arrest and imprisonment ==
In August 1995 Choephel went to Tibet in order to record and videotape Tibetan folk songs for his documentary film. However, in September 1995 he was arrested by Chinese authorities, being charged with "espionage and counter-revolutionary activities" while he was filming his documentary. He was sentenced to 18 years' imprisonment. The Chinese authorities never publicly produced the charges against him.

In August 2000 Choephel's mother and uncle were allowed to visit him. In a statement released on Choephel, he related to his mother Ms. Sonam Dekyi that he had been on a hunger strike in protest over not receiving proper medical care. After the visit, his mother reported that her son was very frail, just "skin and bones", with pale, almost yellow skin.

A highly publicized international campaign that began with his mother's solitary protests finally secured his release in 2002. His case received international attention and support from U.S. Senators James Jeffords and Patrick Leahy of Vermont, U.S. House of Representatives member from Vermont, Bernie Sanders and musicians Annie Lennox, and Paul McCartney. Chophel was released in 2002 on "medical parole" from Chengdu prison after six years imprisonment.

== Documentary film projects ==
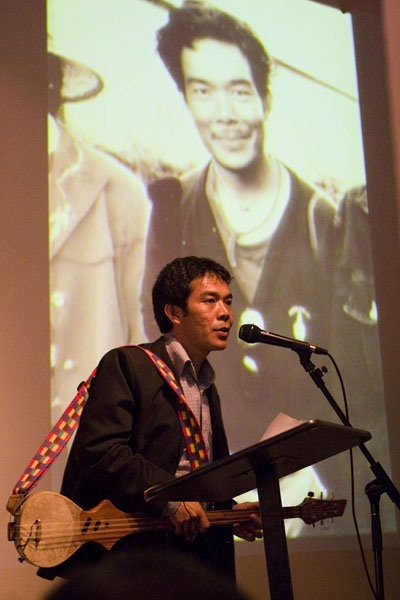
Ngawang Choephel speaking about his film (holding a Tibetan lute)

Choephel resumed working on his documentary film project upon his release from prison in 2002. He directed and produced Tibet in Song, which is his first feature-length documentary on traditional Tibetan folk music and his own harrowing journey into the past fifty years of cultural repression inside Chinese-controlled Tibet. The film premiered at the Sundance Film Festival in 2009 where it won a Special Jury Award in the World Documentary Competition. Was had its initial theatrical release in New York City on September 24, 2010, with plans for U.S. and worldwide release thereafter. Since then, Tibet in Song has been screened worldwide and has won numerous awards, including back using; the CINE Golden Eagle Award; Emerging Director Award, AAIFF; Best Documentary, Calgary International Film Festival; Cinema for Peace International Human Rights Award, Berlin; Best Documentary, San Louis Obispo International Film Festival; Special Jury Mention, One World International Film Festival Prague; Audience Award, Watch Docs International Human Rights Film Festival; Special Jury Mention, Watch Docs International Human Rights Film Festival and Audience Award, Movies that Matter, the Hague. Choephel also is a recipient of Independent Film Project.

Missing in Tibet, a film based on Choephel's story, received the prize for "best Human Rights Film" at a film festival in Taos, New Mexico.

Ngawang Choephel currently resides in the United States and continues to be a high-profile member of the exiled Tibetan community.
