= Bringing Tibet Home =

- Film poster
- Directed by: Tenzin Tsetan Choklay
- Written by: Tenzin Tsetan Choklay/ Tenzing Rigdol
- Produced by: Tenzing Rigdol
- Starring: Tenzing Rigdol; Topten; Neljor; 14th Dalai Lama
- Cinematography: Tenzin Tsetan Choklay
- Edited by: Bernadine Colish; Tenzin Tsetan Choklay; Milica Zec
- Music by: Joel Diamond; Tenzin Choegyal
- Release date: 5 October 2013 (Busan International Film Festival)
- Running time: 82 minutes
- Countries: United States, South Korea, India
- Languages: English; Tibetan

Bringing Tibet Home (in Tibetan: ཕ་ས་བུ་ཐུག in Korean: 아버지의 땅 in Chinese: 夢土) is a 2013 documentary film produced by Tenzing Rigdol and directed by Tibetan filmmaker Tenzin Tsetan Choklay about Tibetan contemporary Artist Tenzing Rigdol's art piece "Our Land Our people". The film premiered at the 2013 Busan International Film Festival in South Korea. This is a Tibetan-language film.

Director Tenzin Tsetan Choklay won the 2014 Prix du Jury des jeunes Européens for the film Bringing Tibet Home at the 27th FIPA - Festival International de Programmes Audiovisuels in Biarritz, France.

The film was invited to a number International film festivals and in Brisbane, Australia at the 22nd Brisbane International Film Festival it received standing ovation from the audience.

== Description ==
In 2011, New York-based Tibetan artist and activist Tenzing Rigdol helped thousands of his countrymen living in exile to temporarily return home. Inspired by his inability to fulfill his dying father's final wish to once again visit his homeland, Rigdol risked incarceration to smuggle 20,000 kg of Tibetan soil from Tibet through the Himalayas to Dharamshala, in India. With it, he created an unprecedented interactive installation, Our Land, Our People, to literally bring Tibet closer to its people. Filmmaker Tenzin Tsetan Choklay documented the entirety of Rigdol's ambitious project, creating an extraordinary documentary - one that is both a moving portrait of a dispossessed people and an inspiring tribute to the transformative power of art.

== Awards and nomination ==
Winner: Prix du Jury des jeunes Européens - 27th FIPA - Festival International de Programmes Audiovisuels 2014 Nominated: FIPA d'or Grand reportage et Investigation - - 27th FIPA - Festival International de Programmes Audiovisuels 2014 Nominated: Jury Award San Francisco International Asian American Film Festival 2014 Nominated: Competition Mecenat Award Busan International Film Festival 2013

== See also ==
- Tibetan-language film
