= Tenzing Rigdol =

American artist

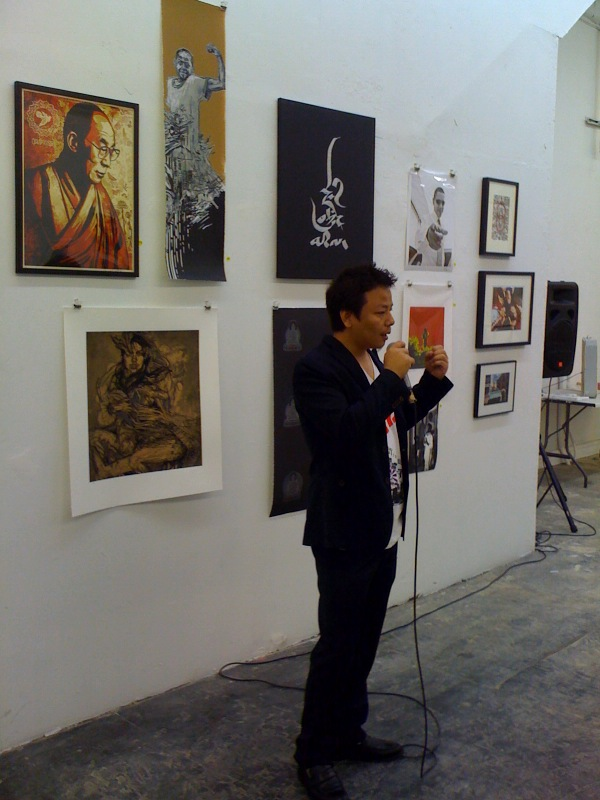
- Born: 1982 (age 43–44); Kathmandu, Nepal

Tenzing Rigdol (born 1982) is an American contemporary artist. He is known for his thought provoking art and art installations, fostering cultural exchange through the Dialogue Artist Residency. His works have been exhibited worldwide, including at the Metropolitan Museum of Art, and he has published poetry collections.

== Early life and education ==
Tenzing Rigdol was born in 1982 in Kathmandu, Nepal. Having completed his education at the University of Colorado Denver College of Arts & Media, Rigdol holds a master's degree in philosophy, a BA-BFA in art and art history, and was honored with an Honorary Doctorate in 2022 by the University of Colorado Board of Regents.

== Career ==
Tenzing Rigdol is a Tibetan American contemporary artist known for his expertise in thangka art. He has gained recognition for his ability to blend Tibetan heritage with modern artistic expressions.

One of his notable projects involved using 20,000 kg of Tibetan soil from Shigatse for an installation in Dharamshala, symbolizing a connection to Tibet for displaced Tibetans.

Rigdol's artworks have been displayed in various galleries and collected by institutions worldwide. In 2014, his artwork Pin drop silence: Eleven-headed Avalokiteshvara was acquired by the Metropolitan Museum of Art in New York.

He established the Dialogue Artist Residency (DAR) to encourage collaboration between Tibetan and international artists.

Rigdol has collaborated with Tibetan filmmakers and contributed to the documentary Bringing Tibet Home (2013). He has published three collections of poems.

== Exhibitions ==
- From February to June 2014, Rigdol was one of two contemporary artists from Tibet and India featured in the "New Beginnings" exhibit at the Metropolitan Museum of Art in New York.
- In 2015, his exhibition "Change Is the Eternal Law" took place at Rossi & Rossi in Hong Kong.
- In 2019, Rigdol's exhibition "Dialogue" was shown at Rossi & Rossi.
- "My World Is in Your Blind-Spot" (2014) was exhibited at Tibet House US in New York, USA, and Emmanuel Art Gallery (2019) in Denver, Colorado, USA.
- Rigdol's exhibition "Perilous Bodies" was held at the Ford Foundation in New York.

2024, Mandalas : Maping the art of Tibet, Biography of a thought MET commission.

== Books ==
- 2009 : Tenzing Rigdol: Experiment with Forms, Rossi & Rossi, ISBN 1906576076

=== Collections of poems ===
- 2008 : R–The Frozen Ink, Paljor Publications, ISBN 819041741X
- 2011 : Anatomy of Nights, Tibet Writes
- 2011 : Butterfly’s Wings, Tibet Writes
