= William Arntz =

American film director and producer

William Arntz is an American film director and producer, best known for directing What the Bleep Do We Know?

== Filmography ==
- 1980 – Producer, Writer, Director, Beat the Deva
- 2000 – Producer, Clouds (producer)
- 2004 – Producer, Writer, Director, What the Bleep Do We Know?
- 2006 – Producer, Writer, Director, What the Bleep! Down the Rabbit Hole (extended edition of What the Bleep for DVD release)
- 2010 – Producer, Writer, Director, GhettoPhysics: Will the Real Pimps and Hos Please Stand Up

== Sources ==
- Dykema, Ravi (January 2005). "An interview with William Arntz". Nexus: Colorado's Holistic Journal. Archived from the original on July 14, 2011.
- "William Arntz". IONS Directory Profile. Institute of Noetic Sciences. Archived from the original on March 6, 2016.
