= Cinema for Peace Foundation =

Film organization based in Berlin

- Formation: 2008; 18 years ago
- Headquarters: 10117 Berlin, Germany
- Founder: Jaka Bizilj
- Website: https://www.cinemaforpeace-foundation.org/

The Cinema for Peace Foundation is a registered, non-profit organization based in Berlin, Germany. It supports film-based projects dealing with global humanitarian and environmental issues, and coordinates the Cinema for Peace awards.

== History ==
Cinema for Peace Foundation was founded by Jaka Bizilj in 2008.

Film Against AIDS. In 2010, the Cinema for Peace Foundation organized a screening of the film, Themba - A Boy Called Hope for school children in Cape Town, South Africa, introduced by the Nobel Peace Laureate, Archbishop Desmond Tutu. The screenings of the film were later extended to nine further rural South African provinces to raise awareness about AIDS prevention.

In 2018, Cinema for Peace Foundation expanded its cinema-based humanitarian projects to include arranging medical treatment for Pussy Riot activist Pyotr Verzilof.

On 22 August 2020, Cinema for Peace organized an emergency medical transport of Russian opposition candidate and anti-corruption activist Alexei Navalny to a Berlin hospital, after his suspected poisoning was recorded in a photograph and on video. Cinema for Peace Foundation's Jaka Bizilj was interviewed at the hospital as Navalny remained in a coma.

== Cinema for Peace Foundation Awareness Programs ==
Berlinger Petition. The Cinema for Peace Foundation initiated a petition to support filmmaker Joe Berlinger, winner of the International Green Film Award at Cinema for Peace 2010, in his defence against a lawsuit by the Chevron Oil Company. In 2010, a U.S. District Court ordered Berlinger to surrender 600 hours of outtakes from his documentary, Crude. The film depicts a lawsuit by indigenous people against the Chevron Oil Company for environmental destruction allegedly caused by the company's activities in Ecuador. On appeal, the U.S. Second Circuit Court of Appeals ultimately limited the amount of footage that Berlinger was required to provide.

Sakineh Mohammadi Ashtiani Awareness Campaign. Sakineh Mohammadi Ashtiani, an Iranian mother of two was convicted of adultery in 2006 and later sentenced to death by stoning. Her execution was postponed, though not commuted. In support of Ashtiani, the Cinema for Peace Foundation organized a press conference, attended by Ashtiani's lawyer and human rights campaigners on 18 August 2010, that included a screening of the film, The Stoning of Soraya M. directed by Cyrus Nowrasteh., winner of the Cinema for Peace Award for Justice 2010. The foundation later mailed DVD copies of The Stoning of Soraya M. to United States Senators, members of the German Parliament and authorities in the Islamic Republic of Iran, demanding the halt of execution by stoning and the immediate release of Ashtiani.

Burma Petition. In February 2011, the Cinema for Peace Foundation organized a petition together with Burmese human rights activist and Nobel Peace Prize laureate Aung San Suu Kyi to demand the release of the Burmese comedian Zarganar and the removal of a work ban imposed on actor U Kyaw Thu.

== Cinema for Peace Foundation Special Initiatives ==
Special Evening on Justice. Together with the Trust Fund for Victims and the International Criminal Court, the Cinema for Peace Foundation organized a Special Evening on Justice on the eve of the Review Conference of the International Criminal Court Statute in Kampala, Uganda. Ban Ki-moon recognized the Cinema for Peace Foundation in his remarks, "Let me applaud Cinema for Peace. Every time you and your friends from the creative community reach out to help people to learn about human rights and justice, you help the UN to keep the peace."

Nobel Peace Prize Screening. On Human Rights Day, 10 December 2010, the Cinema for Peace Foundation, Amnesty International, Movies that Matter and the Human Rights Film Network organized an internationally coordinated screening of Moving the Mountain in honor of Nobel Peace Prize Laureate Liu Xiaobo. The screenings were scheduled to take place on the day Xiaobo would have personally received his Nobel Peace Prize had he not been in prison in China. The film was shown in Berlin, The Hague, the Nobel Peace Center in Oslo, and the Human Rights Film Festivals in Vienna, Warsaw and Amman. Moving the Mountain is a 1994 documentary by Michael Apted that depicts the student-led democracy movement of 1989 in Tiananmen Square.

Celebration of First Ever Logo for Human Rights The first ever logo for human rights was celebrated at an event in New York hosted by the Cinema for Peace Foundation on Friday 23 September 2011. The new design which brings to mind both a human hand and a bird in flight was created by Serbian designer Predrag Stakic. Stakic's logo is the winner of an online contest, and was chosen from more than 15,000 entries which were submitted by designers in 190 countries. Among the guests were Robert De Niro and the German Foreign Minister Guido Westerwelle and various human rights defenders as the mother and the sister of Mohamed Bouazizi, whose self-immolation brought about the Arab Spring. In a video message Aung San Suu Kyi said, "I look forward to a time when this logo will be seen all over the world ... I hope that little children and babies will see it and it will be a sign of happiness, peace and security to them."

Justice Gala On the occasion of the 10th Session of the Assembly of the States Parties of the ICC, the inaugural Justice Gala took place on 12 December 2011 to recognize the growing global role of the ICC in the struggle for international justice and human rights. The Gala was held in New York by the Office of the Prosecutor of the ICC and the Cinema for Peace Foundation. At the Gala event, Justitia Awards were given to Luis Moreno-Ocampo - the first Prosecutor of the ICC - Botswana’s President Ian Khama, Angelina Jolie, Benjamin Ferencz- a Chief Prosecutor of Nazi war crimes at Nuremberg - and other individuals and organizations who have played an important role in fulfilling the mission and goals of the International Criminal Court.

The Prosecutor – In the Name of Justice On 15 June 2012 Cinema for Peace, with the Office of the Prosecutor, hosted a special justice evening in The Hague, to honor and farewell the first Chief Prosecutor of the International Criminal Court and welcome his successor Fatou Bensouda in her new role. During the evening the short film "S.O.S. – Siege on Syria" was premiered.

== Funding ==
The Cinema for Peace Foundation is funded through private donations and from parts of the proceeds of the annual Cinema for Peace Gala and its related charity auction. The Cinema for Peace Foundation is politically, financially and morally completely independent.
