= Jett Garrison =

American transgender writer, director, and producer

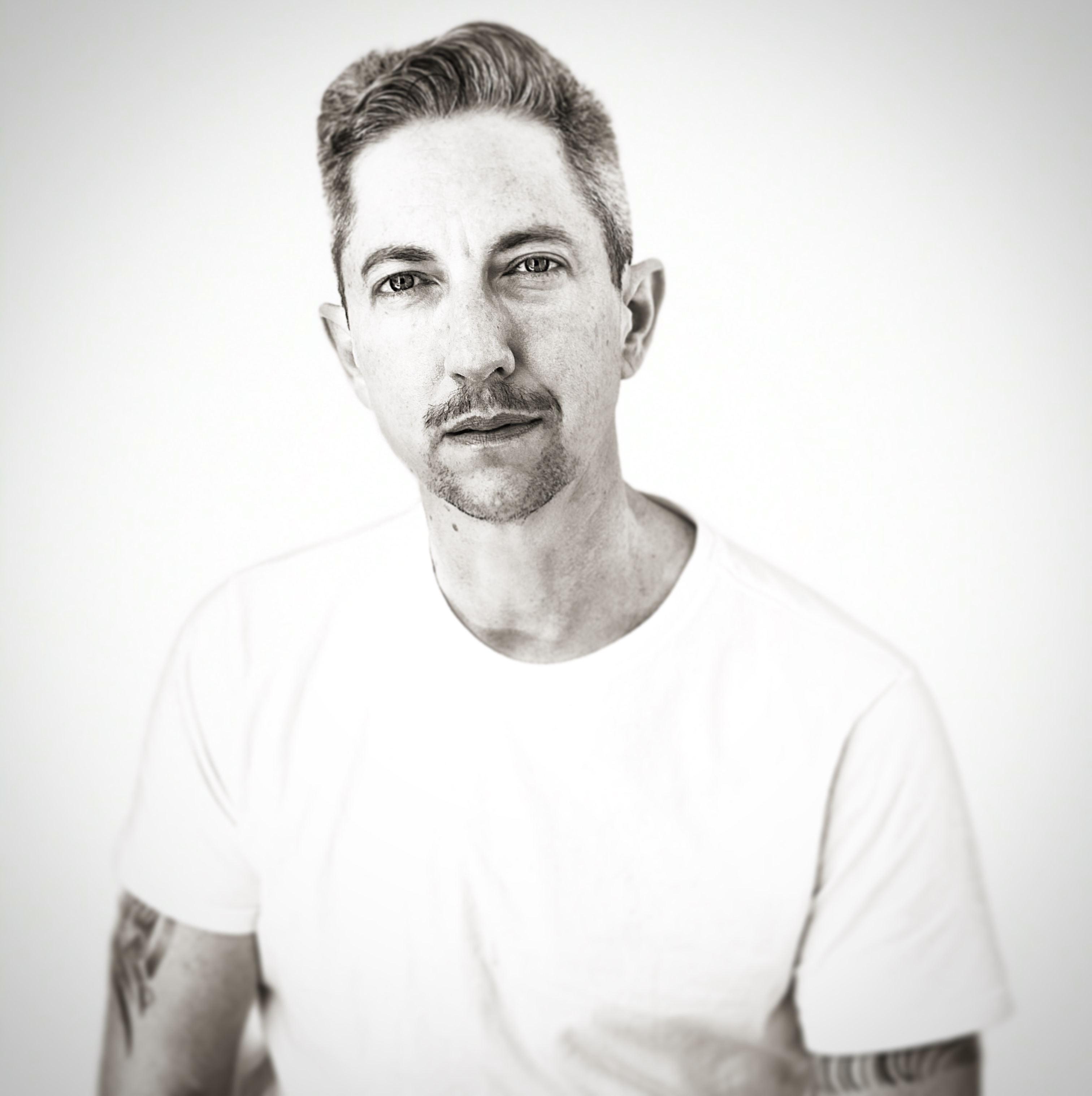
- Garrison in 2020
- Education: University of Texas at Austin (BA, MA, MFA)
- Occupations: Writer; director; producer
- Years active: 2002–present

Jett Garrison is an American transgender writer, director, and producer. He is known for directing on the Amazon Prime Video sitcom Clean Slate (2025), produced by Norman Lear, and for his work as a writer and producer on the Amazon Prime Video series Gen V (2023–2025). His short film Checkout (2006) won a Academy of Television Arts & Sciences award (Emmy), and his short film Jo FM (2005) received a Student Academy Award nomination. (OSCAR)

== Early life and education ==
Garrison grew up in Austin, Texas. After being discharged from the United States Air Force for being queer, he returned to Austin, where he worked as a commercial radio and music DJ/VJ at several stations including KVRX, 101X, KGSR, and The Austin Music Network.

He later enrolled at the University of Texas at Austin, where he earned a Bachelor of Arts in sociology, a Master of Arts in Media Studies with a focus in gender and sexuality, and a Master of Fine Arts in Film Directing.

== Career ==
=== Early film work (2004–2009) ===
Garrison began his filmmaking career directing short films while at the University of Texas at Austin. His 2004 short Standing Up, a narrative/experimental film about a young queer punk befriended by an eccentric older woman at a surreal Texas bus stop, won the Special Jury Award at the Bologna International Women's Film Festival and was broadcast on LOGO TV.

His 2005 short Jo FM, a suspense-drama about an obsessed fan who kidnaps a radio DJ, received a Student Academy Award nomination from the Academy of Motion Picture Arts and Sciences. The film was broadcast on LOGO TV and distributed internationally through CFMDC (Canada) and BILKDRAFT (Germany).

His 2006 short Checkout, a comedy about a man and woman competing for the affection of the same woman at a grocery store, won an Academy of Television Arts & Sciences award (Emmy) and the Members' Choice Award from PlanetOut. It was distributed internationally through CFMDC (Canada) and BILKDRAFT (Germany).

Garrison also directed Prizewhores (2002), a feature documentary about a radio subculture, which premiered at the South by Southwest (SXSW) film festival and was broadcast on KLRU television in Austin, Texas.

=== Film Independent and industry recognition (2009–2018) ===
After relocating to Los Angeles, Garrison was selected for Film Independent's Project Involve directing program (2009), a fellowship supporting emerging filmmakers from underrepresented communities. His work through the program was sponsored by NBCUniversal and was featured in Vanity Fair. He was subsequently invited to participate in Sony's Diverse Directors Program and Ryan Murphy's Half Initiative Directing Program.

=== These Thems and digital series work (2019) ===
In 2019, Garrison directed Season 1 of These Thems, a seven-episode comedic digital series following the lives of four queer friends in New York City, created by and starring Gretchen Wylder. The series was noted by GLAAD as one of the "Top Trans Creatives and Stories to Watch in 2019." It screened at multiple film festivals including Toronto's Inside Out, Atlanta's Out on Film, and Los Angeles' Outfest, and was distributed on Open Television (OTV).

Garrison won the Best Director Award at the Chicago Pride Film Festival for the series, which also received a Best Series Jury Award at the North Carolina Gay and Lesbian Film Festival (NCGLFF) and a Best Comedy award.

In the same year, Garrison directed the pilot for Polygonerz, a digital series for Amazon Prime Video about married game developers who create a game designed to help players find their soulmate.

=== Writing career (2021–present) ===
Garrison is a member of the Writers Guild of America, West. He served as Consulting Producer on Season 1 and Executive Story Editor on Season 2 of Gen V (2023–2024), the Amazon Prime Video spin-off of The Boys, working as an on-set writer/producer. Actor Derek Luh, who appeared in the series, has cited Garrison as instrumental to his portrayal of bigender character Jordan Li. Showrunner Michele Fazekas has also spoken about Garrison's contributions to trans representation on the show.

Garrison also staffed on The CW's reboot of The 4400 (2021–2022), again serving as an on-set writer/producer.

His original feature screenplay Quick Quick Slow was selected for the 2022 GLAAD List, a partnership between GLAAD and The Black List recognizing the best unproduced LGBTQ-inclusive screenplays of the year. The script was also a finalist in Outfest's Screenwriting Lab.

=== Clean Slate (2025) ===
Garrison directed Episodes 5 of Clean Slate, an eight-episode half-hour sitcom that premiered on Amazon Prime Video on February 6, 2025. The series was co-created by and starred Laverne Cox and George Wallace, and was executive produced by Norman Lear via his Act III Productions. It was one of the last series produced by Lear before his death in 2023. The series received an 87% approval rating on Rotten Tomatoes.

== Filmography ==
=== As director ===
Year	Title	Format	Notes
2002	Prizewhores	Documentary feature	Premiered at SXSW; broadcast on KLRU
2004	Standing Up	Short film	Special Jury Award, Bologna International Women's Film Festival
2005	Jo FM	Short film	Student Academy Award nomination
2006	Checkout	Short film	College Television Award (Emmy) winner
2007	The Ticket	Short film	
2007	Vital Signs	Short film	Audience Favorite, McAllen Film & Arts Festival
2008	The Funeral Singer	Short film	Premiered at SXSW and Austin Film Festival
2009	Three Minutes	Short film	Sponsored by Banana Republic, Vanity Fair, NBCUniversal
2019	These Thems (Season 1)	Digital series	Best Director, Chicago Pride Film Festival
2019	Polygonerz (pilot)	Digital series	Amazon Prime Video
2022	The Golden Boys	Short film	
2022	Agents of Change	Short film	
2025	Clean Slate (eps. 5)	Television	Amazon Prime Video; EP: Norman Lear

=== As writer/producer ===
Year	Title	Role	Network
2021–2022	The 4400	Staff writer / on-set writer-producer	The CW
2023–2024	Gen V	Consulting Producer (S1); Executive Story Editor (S2)	Amazon Prime Video

== Awards and recognition ==
Year	Award	Work	Result
2004	Special Jury Award — Bologna International Women's Film Festival	Standing Up	Won
2005	Student Academy Award nomination	Jo FM	Nominated
2006	Academy of Television Arts & Sciences Foundation (Emmy)	Checkout	Won
2006	Members' Choice Award — PlanetOut	Checkout	Won
2007	Audience Favorite — McAllen Film & Arts Festival	Vital Signs	Won
2019	Best Director — Chicago Pride Film Festival	These Thems	Won
2019	Best Series (Jury Award) — NCGLFF	These Thems	Won
2022	GLAAD List / The Black List	Quick Quick Slow (screenplay)	Selected

== See also ==
- List of transgender film and television directors
