= CEMOTAP =

American activist group

Committee to Eliminate Media Offensive to African People
- Founded: 1987; 39 years ago
- Type: Nonprofit organization
- Tax ID no.: 11-3020495
- Location: St. Albans, New York
- Key people: Betty Dopson (Co-Chair); Dr. James McIntosh (Co-Chair)
- Website: www.facebook.com/profile.php?id=100064911121145

The Committee to Eliminate Media Offensive to African People (CEMOTAP) is an American media activism grassroots organization formed circa 1987 to improve the representation of Black people in American mass media. Based in Queens, New York, their roles have included hosting teach-ins, conducting research, lobbying, polling, and supporting public figures whose reputations are damaged by racist media.

As of 2016, the organization has been co-chaired by Betty Dopson and Dr. James McIntosh.

== History ==
The organization was founded circa 1987. Its first meeting was held in the Robert R. Johnson Family Life Center at 172-17 Linden Boulevard in St. Albans, Queens, N.Y.

Since CEMOTAP's inception, it has been funded solely by members and "never sought or accepted grants or funds from outside sources". Despite this, they were able to establish a CEMOTAP Center on Rockaway Boulevard in Queens by at least 2020.

On December 5, 1994, CEMOTAP picketed The New York Times Magazine for running a series of photographs by Eugene Richards, which contained prominent portrayals of Black people as drug addicts and sex workers, without any presence of white drug addicts. CEMOTAP offered $1,000 to anyone who could disprove their assertion that a prominent photograph was staged.

CEMOTAP's 30-year anniversary celebration was held on its original meeting site on Saturday, April 1, 2017. Attorney and activist Gloria J. Browne-Marshall keynoted a program paying tribute to Professor James Blake, student advisor at Borough of Manhattan Community College; Newark activist Fredrica Bey; Pam Africa, advocate for renowned political prisoner Mumia Abu-Jamal; and artist Lucian Pinckney. Attendees included broadcaster Imhotep Gary Byrd and Newark activist Larry Hamm.

On January 25, 2020, they held a standing-room-only forum dedicated to the memories of Dr. Martin Luther King and Elijah Muhammad. Speakers included Minister A. Hafeez Muhammad, Dr. Rosalind Jeffries, Fredrica Bey, James Blake, and co-founder Dr. James McIntosh.

== Current activities ==
=== Netflix boycott ===
In light of the Good Times reboot Good Times: Black Again, the CEMOTAP co-chairs penned an open letter to Netflix CEO Ted Sarandos, condemning the show's depiction of Black people as “unintelligent, violent, simian, and hyper-sexual." They urged the public to boycott Netflix until the show is removed from the platform. Some demonstrations included organizing at Netflix's corporate office in Manhattan and distributing leaflets, protests outside of basketball games in Los Angeles, Chicago, and New York, aiming to hold Stephen Curry accountable for his involvement in the project.

== See also ==
- Representation of African Americans in media
