= Act III Theatres =

American theater company

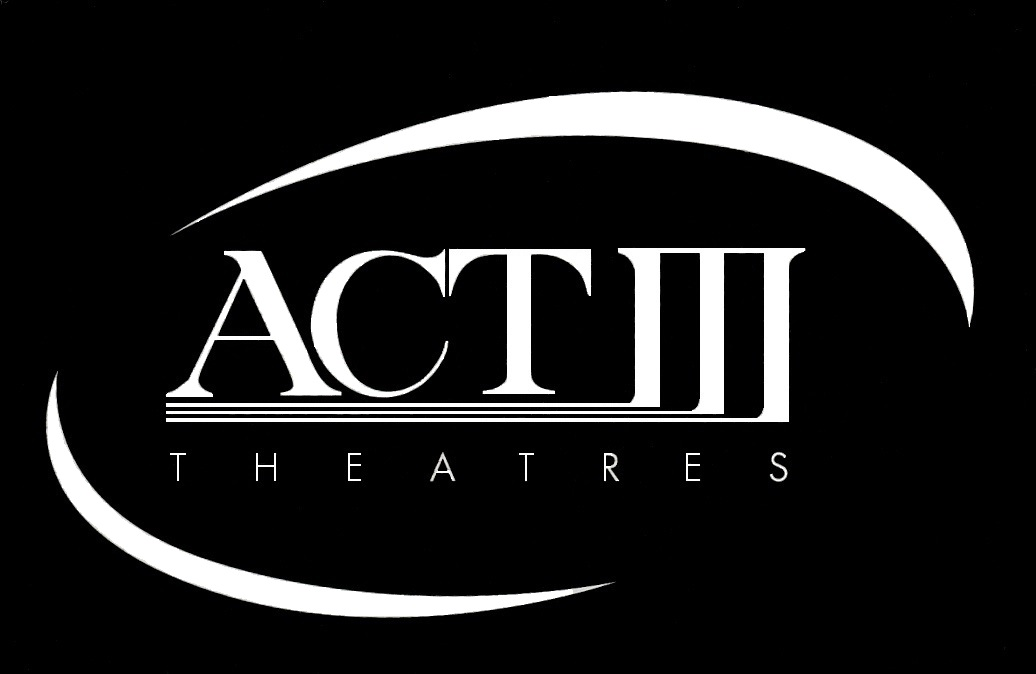
ACT III Theatres

Act III Theatres was an American company that owned movie theater multiplexes and screens principally located in the U.S. states of Texas, Oregon and Washington. The company was in business from 1986 to 1997, when it was sold to Kohlberg Kravis Roberts (KKR). Television producer Norman Lear owned a controlling stake in Act III Theatres through his company Act III Communications. At the time of sale in 1997, Act III Theaters consisted of 124 multiplex theaters operating 793 screens located primarily in San Antonio and Austin, Texas, Portland, Oregon, Washington and Nevada and was the tenth-largest chain of cinemas in the United States.

== Formation of Act III Theatres ==
Act III Theatres was launched in 1986 with the acquisition of Santikos Theatres in San Antonio. Scott C. Wallace, then a senior executive at AMC Theatres, brought the idea to Act III Communications' president Tom McGrath, having received a waiver from his current employer to pursue the transaction.

The group expanded in 1988 by acquiring Luxury Theaters in Portland from Tom Moyer. Luxury Theaters consisted of 87 cinemas operating 293 screens. The purchase price was $150 million. Subsequent to the acquisition of Luxury Theaters, the company's headquarters was relocated from San Antonio to Portland.

Other chains acquired by Act III included Presidio Theaters in Austin. Following the acquisition of Presidio, Act III consolidated its market position by buying AMC's theaters in Austin, creating the dominant theater circuit in that city. To grow its footprint in the Pacific Northwest, Act III acquired Oregon and Washington theaters then owned by Cineplex Odeon in 1992.

== Allegations of illegal buyout efforts ==
In November 1992, a lawsuit was filed by the Plitt Amusement Company which alleged that Act III “induced and persuaded” GE Capital Corporate Finance, which financed both Plitt and Act III, to deny them a loan in 1990, with Act III then illegally purchasing a large number of theaters in the Pacific Northwest and creating a monopoly in the process. Plitt further claimed that the loan which they were denied following Act III's meddling had gotten approved financing from GE.

== Acquisition by KKR ==
KKR acquired Act III Theatres in October 1997 for $323 million plus the assumption of $338 million in debt. The price represents and estimated 11.2x trailing cash flow and 8.8x pro forma cash flow. EBITDA for the group was $59 million for the 12 months ended December 31, 1996. At 11.2x trailing earnings, the acquisition of Act III represented one of the highest valuations ever paid for a chain of movie theaters. Later in 1998, KKR combined its theater operations with the United Artists Theatres held by Hicks Muse and together they acquired Regal Cinemas, creating what is today the largest chain of cinemas in the United States (which operates under the Regal name). In 1990, during the height of the 1990–92 recession, Boston Ventures placed a value on Act III Theatres of 4-5x cash flow while advising majority owner Norman Lear. Simultaneously, Boston Ventures was seeking to acquire various Act III assets.
