= America Divided =

- Genre: Documentary
- Created by: Solly Granatstein; Lucian Read; Rick Rowley
- Starring: Rosario Dawson; America Ferrera; Zach Galifianakis; Norman Lear; Peter Sarsgaard; Jesse Williams; Common; Amy Poehler; Gretchen Carlson; Diane Guerrero; Nick Offerman; Martin Sensmeier; Jussie Smollett
- Theme music composer: J. Period
- Composer: Paul Brill
- Country of origin: United States
- Original language: English
- No. of seasons: 2
- No. of episodes: 12

Production
- Executive producers: Common; Norman Lear; Shonda Rhimes; Solly Granatstein; Lucian Read; Richard Rowley; Jon Kamen; Dave O'Connor; Justin Wilkes; Mark S. Greenberg; Jocelyn Diaz; Ross Bernard; Jill Burkhart; Gretchen Carlson; Jussie Smollett; Brent Miller
- Producers: J. J. Abrams; Katie McGrath; Abby Ellis; Leah Natasha Thomas
- Running time: 34–59 minutes
- Production companies: Act III Productions; Freedom Road Productions; FarWord Films; JustFilms; RadicalMedia; Divided Films

Original release
- Network: Epix
- Release: September 30, 2016 – May 25, 2018

America Divided is an American documentary television series, created by Solly Granatstein, Lucian Read, and Richard Rowley, that premiered on September 30, 2016, on Epix.

== Premise ==
America Divided in Season One explored "critical societal issues from the criminal justice system and education, to housing and heroin, to threats facing American democracy itself." In Season Two, the series will "again go cross-country to investigate the forces driving us apart and introduce viewers to ordinary people engaged in extraordinary efforts to overcome our country's racial, class, gender, religious and partisan divides."

== Production ==
=== Development ===
On January 16, 2016, it was announced that Epix had given the production a series order. The series was created by Solly Granatstein, Lucian Read, and Rick Rowley, all of whom executive produce alongside Norman Lear, Shonda Rhimes, Common, Jon Kamen, Justin Wilkes, Dave O'Connor, Mark S. Greenberg, Jocelyn Diaz, Ross Bernard, and Jill Burkhart. Co-executive producers include Nicole Dow, Derek Dudley, and Brent Miller. Rebecca Teitel and Jesse Williams are senior producers with Abby Ellis and Leah Thomas as producers. Production companies involved with the series include RadicalMedia and Freedom Road Productions.

On July 25, 2017, it was announced at the annual Television Critics Association summer press tour that Epix had renewed the series for a second season consisting of four episodes. Production companies Divided Films, RadicalMedia, and Act III Productions were expected return to produce the second season. Series creators Solly Granatstein, Lucian Read and Richard Rowley will return for Divided Films, as will Jon Kamen and Justin Wilkes for RadicalMedia and Norman Lear and Brent Miller of Act III Productions. At the time it was reported that Lear and Jesse Williams would continue to act as executive producers and correspondents.

=== Casting ===
Alongside the initial series announcement, it was reported that correspondents for the first season would include Common, America Ferrera, Zach Galifianakis, and Amy Poehler among others.

On February 26, 2018, it was announced that Gretchen Carlson, Diane Guerrero, Nick Offerman, Jussie Smollett, and Martin Sensmeier would serve as correspondents in season two.

== Release ==
On September 14, 2016, the Initiative on Business and Public Policy at the Brookings Institution hosted a conversation on housing policy in the Falk Auditorium that featured an early screening of the first season episode A House Divided. Following the screening, IBPP Policy Director Aaron Klein held a one-on-one conversation with Norman Lear who then was joined by a panel that included Lisa Rice of the National Fair Housing Alliance and Mark Calabria of The Cato Institute.

On September 20, 2016, the series held its official premiere at the Hammer Museum's Billy Wilder Theater in Los Angeles, California. Following a screening of the series' first episode, a question-and-answer session was held moderated by Vanity Fair's Krista Smith and featuring Norman Lear and Jesse Williams.

== Episodes ==
Season	Episodes	Originally released	
Season	Episodes	First released	Last released
1	8	September 30, 2016	November 18, 2016
2	4	May 4, 2018	May 25, 2018

=== Season 1 (2016) ===
No. overall	No. in season	Title	Correspondent	Original release date
1	1	"The System"	Common	September 30, 2016
2	2	"A House Divided"	Norman Lear	October 7, 2016
3	3	"Something in the Water"	Rosario Dawson	October 14, 2016
4	4	"The Class Divide"	Jesse Williams	October 21, 2016
5	5	"The Epidemic"	Peter Sarsgaard	October 28, 2016
6	6	"Out of Reach"	America Ferrera	November 4, 2016
7	7	"Democracy for Sale"	Zach Galifianakis	November 11, 2016
8	8	"Home Economics"	Amy Poehler	November 18, 2016

=== Season 2 (2018) ===
No. overall	No. in season	Title	Correspondent	Original release date
9	1	"Washington's War on Women"	Gretchen Carlson	May 4, 2018
10	2	"Who Controls the Land"	Martin Sensmeier	May 11, 2018
11	3	"There Has to be a Better Way"	Diane Guerrero / Nick Offerman	May 18, 2018
12	4	"Whose History?"	Jussie Smollett	May 25, 2018

Director Lucian Read drew a connection between the hoaxed hate crime of actor Jussie Smollett and the episode of America Divided about lynching which he directed; Smollett narrated and appeared in the episode. Epix released a statement in February 2019 saying "with respect to the sensitivities around recent events... Epix is no longer making available the episode of America Divided featuring Jussie Smollett."
