= Good Times: Black Again =

2024 Canadian-American adult animated sitcom

- Genre: Sitcom
- Based on: Good Times by: Eric Monte; Mike Evans
- Developed by: Ranada Shepard; Carl Jones
- Showrunner: Ranada Shepard
- Voices of: J. B. Smoove; Marsai Martin; Yvette Nicole Brown; Slink Johnson; Jay Pharoah
- Countries of origin: Canada; United States
- Original language: English
- No. of seasons: 1
- No. of episodes: 10

Production
- Executive producers: Ranada Shepard; Norman Lear; Brent Miller; Seth MacFarlane; Erica Huggins; Stephen Curry; Erick Peyton; Jeron Smith
- Running time: 24 minutes
- Production companies: Coco Cubana Productions; Act III Communications; Fuzzy Door Productions; Unanimous Media; Sony Pictures Television Studios

Original release
- Network: Netflix
- Release: April 12, 2024

Related
- Good Times

Good Times: Black Again (simply referred to as Good Times in the marketing) is an adult animated sitcom and reboot of the sitcom Good Times. It centers on the current generation of the Evans family, and stars Jay Pharoah, Marsai Martin, Yvette Nicole Brown, Slink Johnson, and J. B. Smoove. The series was released on Netflix on April 12, 2024. In November 2025, the series was canceled after one season.

Since its trailer release, the show has been condemned by multiple civil rights organizations, including the NAACP, the CEMOTAP, and the December 12th Movement. The groups took issue with the obscene, sexualized, violent, and negative portrayal of African Americans.

== Voice cast and characters ==
=== Main ===
- J. B. Smoove as Reggie Evans
- Marsai Martin as Grey Evans
- Yvette Nicole Brown as Beverly Evans
- Slink Johnson as Dalvin Evans
- Jay Pharoah as Junior Evans

=== Recurring ===
- Michael McDonald as Elon Musk
- Todd Haberkorn as Jeff Bezos
- Jim Meskimen as Bill Gates

== Episodes ==
No.	Title	Directed by	Written by	Original release date
1	"Meet the Evans of New"	Aaron Brewer	Ranada Shepard	April 12, 2024
2	"Black of Focus"	AnnMarie Roberts	Devon Shepard	April 12, 2024
3	"Grey's Anatomy"	AnnMarie Roberts	Randa Shepard, Brian Ashburn, & Rashida Olayiwola	April 12, 2024
4	"They Came Before Elon"	Brian Kaufman	Devon Shepard	April 12, 2024
5	"Primary Coloreds"	Tristram Waples	Joshua Krist & Eric Lev	April 12, 2024
6	"The Red Treaty"	Brian Kaufman & Tristram Waples	Kevin Townsley	April 12, 2024
7	"#BlackLoveDay"	AnnMarie Roberts	Alyson Fouse	April 12, 2024
8	"Big Sister Is Watching"	Brian Kaufman	Brian Ashburn	April 12, 2024
9	"Moving On Out"	Aaron Brewer	Joshua Krist & Eric Lev	April 12, 2024
10	"The Projects Divided"	Tristram Waples	Randa Shepard & Alyson Fouse	April 12, 2024

== Production and release ==
In September 2020, it was announced that Good Times would receive an animated sitcom revival with Carl Jones originally attached as showrunner and producer and with Norman Lear originally executive producing alongside Seth MacFarlane and Stephen Curry for Netflix. 6 Point Harness and the Melbourne-based studio Studio Moshi handled the animation.

In December 2023, it was announced Ranada Shepard had replaced Carl Jones as showrunner for the series. Shepard stated that the show is "...about family coming together, laughing together, dancing together, picking on each other, driving each other crazy, all while surviving."

The series was released on April 12, 2024.

== Reception ==
Good Times: Black Again was panned by critics and audiences, with criticism aimed towards the animation style, the crass presentation, offensive humor, and general lack of connection to the original series aside from occasional mentions of the James Evans character. Despite referring to the jokes as "stereotypical", Bubbleblabber called it the #1 American adult animated comedy of 2024 after it began to "[lean] into more dramedy".

Upon its trailer's release, CEMOTAP publicly condemned it as a "racist cartoon" in the same vein as 1915 film The Birth of a Nation. The NAACP and the December 12th Movement have also condemned the show's representation of Black families and children. The groups' outrage involves the show's obscene, sexualized, violent, and stereotypical portrayal of African Americans.

On May 13, 2024, CEMOTAP co-chairs Dr. James McIntosh and Betty Dopson sent an open letter of "outrage" to Ted Sarandos condemning the show for its portrayal of Black people as unintelligent, violent, simian, and hypersexual; and its usage of obscenity, pedophilia, slurs, drug-dealing, and weaponry. They claimed it had "only the most superficial and negative relationship to the original Good Times TV series", as well as criticizing its disrespectful references to Rosa Parks; the Christian God; Jesus Christ; and the Egyptian God Anubis. They drew parallels with Seth MacFarlane's previous controversial depictions of Harriet Tubman. CEMOTAP urged members of the public to call Netflix and cancel their subscriptions, boycotting Netflix until the show is taken off the streaming service, and for an equal amount of time afterwards.

On June 5, 2024, CEMOTAP led a demonstration at the Netflix Corporate office on Broadway in Manhattan. In December of that year, CEMOTAP passed out leaflets outside of the Netflix office in New York. They asked the public to call NBA commissioner Adam Silver "regarding his double standard" for punishing Kyrie Irving for tweeting a link to the anti-Semitic film Hebrews to Negroes: Wake Up Black America "while saying nothing to Stephen Curry, who is the executive producer" of Black Again.
