= Phillip Garcia =

American film and television actor

- Born: 1987 or 1988 (age 38–39); San Jose, California, U.S.
- Education: American Musical and Dramatic Academy
- Occupations: Film and television actor
- Years active: 2010–present

Phillip Garcia (born 1987/1988) is an American film and television actor. He is best known for playing the petty criminal Rooster in the American crime comedy television series Sprung.

== Life and career ==
Garcia was born in San Jose, California. He is of Mexican descent. He attended and graduated from the American Musical and Dramatic Academy. He began his screen career in 2010, appearing in the Spike docufiction anthology television series 1000 Ways to Die. In 2012, he appeared in an episode of the NBC sitcom television series Whitney.

Later in his career, in 2022, Garcia starred as the petty criminal Rooster in the Amazon Freevee crime comedy television series Sprung, starring along with Garret Dillahunt, Shakira Barrera and Martha Plimpton. In 2025, he starred as Harry Slate's neighbor Miguel in the Amazon Prime Video sitcom television series Clean Slate, starring along with Laverne Cox, George Wallace, Jay Wilkison, Norah Murphy, D.K. Uzoukwu and Telma Hopkins. He guest-starred in television programs including NCIS: Los Angeles, Chicago P.D., Will Trent, CSI: Vegas and Criminal Minds. He also appeared in films such as Okja and Terminator: Dark Fate.
