= Brent Miller =

Brent Miller may refer to:

- Brent Miller (actor), Canadian actor and voice actor
- Brent Miller (producer) (born 1975), American film and television producer

== See also ==
- Miller (surname)
