= Act III Publishing =

American trade magazine publisher

Act III Publishing was a company that published a number of trade magazines that covered the Media, Publishing, Music and Television Industries. The company was in business from 1985 to approximately 1991/92 when the various titles were sold to a variety of other publishers and the remaining titles were shut down. Act III Publishing was owned by the famous TV producer/writer Norman Lear who held a controlling interest through his company Act III Communications. The company was based in New York City.

== Early Experience In Publishing - Channels ==
Norman Lear acquired Channels magazine in 1985, prior to the formation of Act III. The title had been founded as a non-profit publication by well-known television industry writer and commentator Les Brown (1929-2013). The magazine was originally titled Channels of Communication. It was started in 1981 and was funded by the John and Mary Markle Foundation until the acquisition by Lear. Channels was comprehensively re-designed and re-launched in March 2006 as a for-profit trade publication. Its frequency was changed from bimonthly to monthly and Les Brown brought on board experienced Washington Post media reporter Merrill Brown as Executive Editor. At the same time the editorial focus of the magazine was re-calibrated. While still focusing on the television business, it shifted from a mix of the art, technology and business of television with perhaps a 20% emphasis on business, to at least a 50% emphasis on business. Channels was a so-called "controlled circulation" publication, meaning that it was distributed free of charge to a select audience of media and entertainment specialists to which the advertising could be precisely targeted. (see:Magazine Controlled Circulation section)

== Formation of Act III Publishing ==
ACT III Publishing was formed in 1986 as a subsidiary of Act III Communications and was led by long-time Lear Associate Paul David Schaeffer from its formation until 1991. Schaeffer had worked with Lear at Embassy Communications prior to its sale to The Coca-Cola Company and was the initial chief financial officer of Act III Communications and negotiated the acquisition of Channels. Schaeffer was appointed CEO of Act III Publishing in January 1987.

Following the acquisition of Channels, Act III acquired Marketing and Media Decisions, a trade magazine covering the advertising and marketing business with a focus on the management and operations of marketing organizations. The magazine was acquired from its management/owners Robert C. Gardner, president; David C. Bentley, publisher; and Venture lending Associates in October 1986. Bentley and Gardner had acquired the magazine in 1982 from the founder Norman R. Glenn for a reported $7 million. The title was eventually sold by Act III to Affiliated Publications (owners of The Boston Globe) in October 1990.

Mix Publications was acquired in January 1989. Mix Magazine is a trade magazine that specializes in audio and video engineering for professionals in the music and Film/TV industries. The acquisition also included Electronic Musician which covers the technology and gear used by professional musicians whether onstage or in the studio. Mix was launched in 1977 by David Schwartz and Penny Jacob in Marin, CA near San Francisco under the name The Mix. Mix acquired the start-up magazine Electronic Musician in 1985. Electronic Musician was launched in 1975 as Polyphony as a hobbyist magazine for musicians using technology edited by founder Marvin Jones. In 1980, well-known audio engineer Craig Anderton became editor and re-focused the magazine on professional musicians and the emerging technology of MIDI recording (MIDI is an acronym that stands for Musical Instrument Digital Interface). Mix started the Technical Excellence and Creativity Awards (TEC) in 1985 and subsequently sponsored the launch of the Mix Hall of Fame in 1988 and the Les Paul Awards in 1991. Mix also published the Mix Bookshelf, a series of reference books.

The Mix group was sold to Primedia (now RentGroup) in 1990 which subsequently spun them off as part of Prism Business Media in 2005. Prism was merged with Penton Media in 2007 by MidOcean Partners and Wasserstein & co. Mix and Electronic Musician were then sold by Penton Media to NewBay Media in February 2011.

In 1988 Act III launched Television Business International in London. TBI, as it was known, covers the international television sales and production market. It was later sold to Informa Telecoms and Media and has been published under the name TBIvision since 2007.

== Act III Titles ==
Act III Publishing built a large group of related trade magazines and directories which were primarily controlled circulation titles published monthly or bi-monthly.

The group was built through acquisition and new launches. Acquisitions included:

- Channels of Communication (later Channels)
- Marketing and Media Decisions
- The Broadband Group, including:
  - Broadcast Management/Engineering (later Television Engineering)
  - World Broadcast News
  - Educational and Industrial Television
- Mix Publications (acquired 1989), including:
  - Electronic Musician
  - Mix Magazine
  - Mix Bookshelf
  - The Mix Technical Excellence and Creativity Awards
- The Television Programming Source Books
- Market Shares and Show Biz News

Act III launched the titles:

- Television Business International (now known as TBI Vision)
- Corporate Video Decisions
- The Marketer
