= Harold Gaba =

American businessman

Harold Gaba, also known as Hal Gaba (January 22, 1946 – March 9, 2009), was an American businessman. He served as president and CEO of Act III Communications, chairman of Concord Music Group, and co-chairman of Village Roadshow Pictures.

== Early life ==
Gaba was born January 22, 1946, in Oakland, California. He received a bachelor's degree in finance at the University of California, Berkeley, where he was a member of Pi Lambda Phi, and a master's degree in finance at the University of California, Los Angeles.

== Career ==
Gaba's career began in 1967 as a research analyst at William O'Neil & Co. His long-time association with Norman Lear started in 1974 when he joined Lear, Bud Yorkin, and Jerry Perenchio at Tandem Productions as an acquisitions consultant. Gaba went on to serve as president of Embassy Pay Television and vice chairman of Hal Roach Studios.

In 1990, Gaba became president and CEO of Norman Lear's Act III Communications, a media holding company with interests in broadcasting, theatrical exhibition, publishing, motion pictures, and music. In 1999, Lear and Gaba became co-owners of Concord Records, founded in 1973 as a jazz label in Concord, California. In 2006, Gaba and Lear, joined by their long-time colleague Michael Lambert, acquired a 50% interest in Village Roadshow Pictures.

Gaba was a member of the board of directors for World Trade Bank, Union Rescue Mission, Univision, Herbalife, the Henry Mancini Institute, and the Curtis School. He also was part of the executive committee at the Weizmann Institute of Science.

== Personal life ==
Gaba was married to Carole Gaba. They lived in the Bel Air neighborhood of Los Angeles and had two children, Lauren and Elizabeth. Gaba died from prostate cancer on March 9, 2009, at the age of 63.
