= List of transgender film and television directors =

This is a list of transgender or non-binary film and television directors. Their works may include live action, animated, documentary, and short films; television series and movies, web series, and videos.

== Directors ==
- M. J. Bassett
- Leo Behrens
- Lucy Belgum
- Harrison Browne
- Sammi Cohen
- Skyler Cooper
- Emanuele Crialese
- Luis De Filippis
- Morty Diamond
- Vera Drew
- Zackary Drucker
- Rhys Ernst
- Sam Feder
- StormMiguel Florez
- Yance Ford
- Sydney Freeland
- Jett Garrison
- Gooseworx
- Jake Graf
- Afioco Gnecco
- Ro Haber
- Theda Hammel
- Gwen Haworth
- Silas Howard
- ND Johnson
- Selene Kapsaski
- Sir Lex Kennedy
- Seven King
- Emmett Lundberg
- AJ Mattioli
- Nava Mau
- Janet Mock
- Elliot Page
- Kimberly Reed
- Lucah Rosenberg-Lee
- Isabel Sandoval
- Ashley Hans Scheirl
- Jane Schoenbrun
- D. Smith
- ND Stevenson
- Tourmaline
- Wu Tsang
- Raven Two Feathers
- Rain Valdez
- Lana Wachowski
- Lilly Wachowski
- Louise Weard
- Quen Wong
- Campbell X
