= Sprung (TV series) =

Television series

- Genre: Crime; Comedy
- Created by: Greg Garcia
- Written by: Greg Garcia
- Directed by: Greg Garcia
- Starring: Garret Dillahunt; Shakira Barrera; Phillip Garcia; Clare Gillies; James Earl; Martha Plimpton
- Music by: John E. Low
- Country of origin: United States
- Original language: English
- No. of episodes: 9

Production
- Executive producers: Jonathan Berry; Garret Dillahunt; Greg Garcia; Michael Rotenberg
- Producers: Aaron Greenberg; Henry J. Lange, Jr.
- Cinematography: Chad Persons
- Editors: William Marrinson; Lawrence A. Maddox
- Running time: 35–40 minutes
- Production companies: Amigos de Garcia Productions; 3 Arts Entertainment; Picrow; Amazon Studios

Original release
- Network: Amazon Freevee
- Release: August 19 – September 15, 2022

Sprung is an American crime comedy television series created by Greg Garcia. It premiered on the streaming service Amazon Freevee on August 19, 2022.

== Synopsis ==
After spending nearly three decades in prison, Jack is released and has to figure out where he will now live. His determination not to reenter a life of crime is challenged when his former cellmate Rooster offers a room at his mother Barb's house, with the stipulation that Jack join their criminal enterprise.

== Cast ==
=== Main ===
- Martha Plimpton as Barb
- Garret Dillahunt as Jack
- Shakira Barrera as Gloria
- Phillip Garcia as Rooster
- Clare Gillies as Wiggles
- James Earl as Melvin

=== Guest ===
- Kate Walsh as Congresswoman Paula Tackleberry
- Susan Ruttan as Lorraine
- David Wells as Herb
- Fred Grandy as Horace Tackleberry
- Camden Garcia as Collin
- Andre Jamal Kinney as Brett
- Chris Bauer as Stan
- Mark Christopher Lawrence
- Mike Rob
- Steven Ogg as Spike

== Episodes ==
No. overall	No. in season	Title	Directed by	Written by	Original release date
1	1	"Episode 1"	Greg Garcia	Greg Garcia	August 19, 2022
In 2020, at the beginning of the pandemic, Jack and Rooster are released from prison due to Coronavirus mandates. Since Jack (serving 30 years for selling weed due to mandatory sentencing guidelines back in 1994) has no place to live, Rooster offers to let him stay with his mom, Barb. They also invite a woman prisoner, Gloria, who was just released, too. Arriving at Barb's home, they are fed and clothed, but Barb insists that they join her "crew" to commit crimes. Jack insists he's not a "real criminal" and refuses. When Barb kicks him out, Jack realizes that life outside prison during Coronavirus is tough. So he decides he'll join Barb's crew, but only if they rob people who are bad and really deserve it. Jack has learned much about safely committing crimes during his 26 years in prison, and devises a plan to rob Melvin, a local bad guy who is hoarding toilet paper and selling it at an extreme mark-up. All goes well during the robbery, and afterwards Jack secretly does a good deed to help a local nurse keep in touch with her two children.
2	2	"Episode 2"	Greg Garcia	Greg Garcia	August 19, 2022
Jack begins wearing a nice wool sweater in Barb's extra clothing box. The crew decides to rob a local congresswoman who sold stock at the beginning of the pandemic while telling her constituents that all was well and the pandemic would end soon. Jack gets sick, and the crew decides to get him tested for Coronavirus at the local animal clinic that tests peoples pets and the owners, too, for cash money. While Barb and Rooster attempt to steal Q-tips, they discover that the clinic isn't really testing the people and are just keeping the money patients pay them. Jack shares with Gloria that he hasn't spoken with his parents since he went to prison, and isn't even sure if they're alive. The crew breaks into the clinic at night to steal the cash, a laptop, and of course, Q-tips. Afterwards, Gloria tells Jack that she had located his parents, and they live in a retirement home in San Diego. She sets up a video conference with them and Jack speaks with them for the first time in 26 years. During the conversation they explain that he is allergic to wool, which explains his "sickness". Later that night, Jack anonymously notifies the people in the clinic's database that they were not actually tested, and returns their money to them.
3	3	"Episode 3"	Greg Garcia	Greg Garcia	August 26, 2022
In a flashback to 2017, we see Rooster meet Wiggles, a local bikini dancer. (In 2020, she's now dating Melvin.) Rooster eventually falls in love with Wiggles and places an engagement ring in a hotdog to surprise her. She accidentally swallows the ring. At this moment, his mom Barb walks up to them and tells Rooster to choose between his Mom and Wiggles. Rooster chooses Barb. Gloria continues researching the crooked congresswoman to see how they can rob her of an expensive painting. Gloria knows a Russian hacker who can get the password to the congresswoman's internal security cameras for $5,000. Rooster has decided that he wants to woo Wiggles back away from Melvin. He talks to her and she suggests that if he could get the ring back and put it into another hot bog, she might say yes, but she gave the ring away, and it's now in the hands of the local cocaine dealer. Rooster asks to buy it back, but the dealer takes his money and runs him off. Rooster goes home and gets his mom's gun, intending to rob the drug dealer. Jack, who is on his way to a teaching job interview (He earned a teaching certificate while in prison.), overhears Rooster's plan, and decides to go after Rooster. When Jack arrives, Rooster has been captured, and Jack, who learned many fighting skills in prison, rescues Rooster, taking a bag of money from the drug dealer. Gloria uses this money to get the password from the Russian hacker, and now they can spy on the congresswoman. Jack goes to the local high school for his interview, and he is the perfect candidate, except that he's a convicted drug felon. Jack decides to leave the crew and go to see his parents, but Gloria tells him she can get him a new identity so he can get that teaching job. Jack decides to stay, and secretly donates the remaining bag money to a local free food kitchen. Meanwhile, Melvin discovers that Rooster is trying to woo Wiggles away from him.
4	4	"Episode 4"	Greg Garcia	Greg Garcia	August 26, 2022
Melvin ties Rooster up and beats him to learn who robbed him. Rooster keeps quiet until Melvin begins kissing Wiggles, which triggers Rooster to tell all about their 4-person crew. Barb spends her days watching the congresswoman through her internal security cameras to learn about the congresswoman's habits so they can rob her. Melvin shows up at Barb's house and shares that Rooster told him everything about their robbing him. Melvin forces them to help him rob the empty high school of their musical instruments, or he'll turn them in to the police. While Rooster and Jack help Melvin, Barb tries to befriend Gloria, but Gloria is stand-offish to her. Back at Melvin's house (before robbing the high school) Melvin and Jack begin to bond. Rooster gets angry and leaves, so Melvin and Jack rob the school without him. After they're finished, Jack uses Rooster's knife to stab the truck's tire, blaming Rooster for flattening the tire. When they pull over, they hear the police coming. Melvin unselfishly tells Jack to leave: he says the police know it's Melvin's truck, but they don't know about Jack. Jack runs away just before the police show up. We then see that Jack has planned the whole thing, and used Rooster's knife so Melvin trusts him. Now Melvin is in jail, and the crew are safe. The episode ends with Rooster and Jack stealing toilet paper from Melvin and dropping them off to the houses in the neighborhood. Meanwhile, Barb sees that the congresswoman will be leaving for vacation in just a few days.
5	5	"Episode 5"	Greg Garcia	Greg Garcia	September 2, 2022
We start with Jack and Gloria getting smart phones for everyone to use on the heist. Gloria convinces Jack to ask his artist mother to paint a copy of the expensive painting they plan to steal. She agrees, and mentions that Jack's dad is getting stir crazy since they must stay in their apartments due to COVID rules. Rooster works on winning back Wiggles, who is pole dancing on a stripper party bus due to COVID restrictions closing the strip club. She tells Rooster she needs someone who makes his own decisions, and doesn't just do what others tell him to do. Rooster wants to tell her about the heist, but Jack says no. Jack & Rooster go to the local strip club. It's now open since it has giant plastic bubble-balls that the customers sit in and the strippers stand in so everyone is separated. Later Rooster meets Wiggles and sings for her, convincing her to be his girlfriend again. Gloria's artwork fence thinks she's working for the cops so he won't help her sell the painting. Barb pretends to like the bank manager as part of their plan. We see Barb steal a Soda Stream from her neighbor's porch, and later the cops show up. The cop tows Barb's car after seeing several unpaid tickets piled in the back. Jack tricks the party bus driver to gets the bus for their heist. Meanwhile, all the bubble-balls from the strip club go missing. Later, Jack's mom calls and tells him a bunch of bubble-balls got delivered to the old-folks home and they can all now go outside now and interact with each other from inside the balls, making them all happy, including Jack's dad. When they get to the house for the heist, someone is already there stealing everything, including the painting they planned to steal.
6	6	"Episode 6"	Greg Garcia	Greg Garcia	September 2, 2022
At the congresswoman's house, Rooster runs to the thieves' van to quickly swap out the forged painting for the real one. The thieves accidentally lock Rooster in the van. Our team follows Rooster using his cell phone as a tracker. When the thieves stop at a gas station, Rooster hops out with the painting. When they check the painting Rooster rescued, they find it's the forgery. In a flashback, we see Barb telling Rooster about her online boyfriend, Jean Michel. Since they don't have the real painting, Barb suggests they blackmail the congresswoman. Gloria says no, and Barb and Gloria get into a fight. Gloria gets her pistol from the freezer and orders Gloria and Jack to leave. We see a flashback with Jack and Gloria romancing each other in jail. Now homeless, they get drunk from cheap liquor and kiss each other. Barb shows Rooster how the cameras in the congresswoman's house have speakers, and how the dog's food dispenser can give the dog a treat. The dog ends up bumping into, and breaking, a statue. Jack and Gloria break into Barb's house later that night to get food and money. They get caught by Barb and Rooster, but they all make up. Back in the house, they watch the video of the dog breaking the statue and see what happens next. The congresswoman and her senile husband talk about their crooked plans. They switched their expensive art works for fakes and will burn their house and claim the insurance, Afterwards, they will sell all the real items at auction. They will also buy stocks of the COVID vaccine companies using her congressional inside knowledge, but will use an account set up in their cleaning lady's name to avoid getting caught.
7	7	"Episode 7"	Greg Garcia	Greg Garcia	September 8, 2022
In a flashback, we see Barb watch as Rooster is sent to prison. Lonely, she joins an online dating site. She doesn't get any hits until one day she's contacted by Jean Michel. Barb sends him money and even her new cellphone, but he never videos her, only sending her photos. They ask Barb to "romance" Stan the bank manager since they'll need him to help get the money from the congresswoman's account. Barb is not comfortable "cheating" on Jean Michel. Gloria and Jack believe Jean Michel is scamming her for money, so they decide to "open her eyes" by driving her to his house and confronting him. Rooster learns the congresswoman will head to the cleaning lady's house, and he volunteers to follow her to learn who the cleaning lady is. The crew tell him not to, but with Wiggle's support, he does it anyway. Barb, Gloria, and Jack find Jean Michel, and he's actually the hot hunk that Barb has been dating. But Barb wants to wait until tomorrow to approach him, so they get hotel rooms for the night. Gloria and Jack sneak into Jean Michel's home to get evidence that he's scamming her. His girlfriend shows up and they have sex together. Gloria and Jack sneak out and go back to their hotel room and have sex themselves. Wiggles and Rooster find the cleaning lady and follow her to the grocery store where they steal her driver's license. The next morning Barb greets the hunky Jean Michel, but he says he has no idea who she is. They go into the house and find that Jean Michel's father is the person who's been contacting Barb, using photos of his son since he's not very attractive. Barb decides she's not interested in him after all, and they head back home.
8	8	"Episode 8"	Greg Garcia	Greg Garcia	September 8, 2022
Jack has a flashback to when Spike turned Jack over to the police to avoid going to jail. Back at the house, Barb catches Wiggles in bed with Rooster and chases her out of the house. Once they're all outside, Melvin shows up, having gotten out of jail. He chases after Rooster, who gets the gun out of the freezer. Wiggles tells Melvin (and Barb) that she and Rooster are getting married. Rooster can't hold the frozen gun so he puts it in the microwave. The gun fires and narrowly misses hitting Barb. Melvin decides he just needs to chill out so he invites Jack to join him on a run to go get some medical marijuana. When they get there, Jack finds that the supplier is none other than Spike. Meanwhile, Barb has dinner with Stan across the fence (as his mother is Barb's neighbor). After talking with Stan, Barb decides to give Wiggles a chance and see if she's truly right for Rooster. Jack follows Spike and kidnaps him. Barb asks Wiggles dozens of questions about Rooster and she gets them all correct. Back at the house, Jack decides to give Spike a taste of prison life to get him back for his 26 years of being locked up. But Jack soon realizes he's the one responsible for getting himself sent to prison, not Spike. Barb tells Rooster that he can marry Wiggles. Jack lets Spike go, and Gloria tells him that all of the congresswoman's real art works sold for $2.5 million.
9	9	"Episode 9"	Greg Garcia	Greg Garcia	September 15, 2022
Gloria has discovered that tomorrow the congresswoman will learn the names of the companies who will create the vaccine and she'll withdraw all her money to buy those stocks, meaning the crew can't steal the money. The crew needs the congresswoman's cleaning lady's account number, but they don't know the answers to the cleaning lady's account security questions. Jack creates a fake writing contest and gets the cleaning lady's son to enter. The story guideline asks for things like Mom's first car, her first pet's name, etc., and they use this info to access her account. Barb contacts the bank manager to set up a date with him, saying she wants him badly, and hopes he can be spontaneous and sexy. Jack and Gloria pretend to be FBI agents and get info from the congresswoman's driver about when she'll be at the Capitol for her meeting. Jack pretends to be the new driver to delay her in a cell phone dead zone so she won't know they're resetting the cleaning lady's account password. But now Rooster will have to take Jack's role as the person who stops the congresswoman's car (claiming construction up ahead) in the cell phone dead zone. That means Wiggles will need to take Rooster's place on a key phone call later. While talking to Wiggles, Rooster steals a police car to help Jack delay the congresswoman. Gloria stops by the bank pretending to be the cleaning lady and shows the manager that someone overpaid her account by about $2.5 million, and she wants the money sent back. The manager calls the number and it's Wiggles on the other end; she gives the bank manager the account number for the crew's new account. Barb shows up at the bank and tells Stan (the manager) that she wants to have sex with him right now, so he'd better hurry with the refund (bypassing many safety protocols). The plan works and the crew now have their $2.5 million. Gloria provides Jack with his new fake ID and he decides to move to San Diego to be with his parents. He wants Gloria to join him, but she want to move to Miami. Gloria and Jack say goodbye to Barb and Rooster, and they go their separate ways. Jack is happy with his parents, and Gloria is still ripping off artwork in Miami.

== Production ==
=== Casting ===
On April 28, 2021, it was announced that IMDb TV (later renamed Amazon Freevee) gave a series greenlight to Sprung, a single-camera comedy created by Greg Garcia and starring Garret Dillahunt, Illeana Douglas, and Phillip Garcia. On September 1, 2021, it was reported that Douglas would be replaced by Martha Plimpton. Garcia, Dillahunt, and Plimpton previously worked together on the sitcom Raising Hope. On May 2, 2022, it was reported that Kate Walsh, Camden Garcia, and Andre Jamal Kinney had joined the cast. The series also stars Shakira Barrera, James Earl, and Clare Gillies, and guest stars Chris Bauer, Mark Christopher Lawrence, Mike Rob, Fred Grandy, Steven Ogg, Susan Ruttan, and David Wells.

=== Filming ===
The sitcom was filmed throughout the Pittsburgh area in the summer and fall of 2021. Greg Garcia wrote and directed all nine episodes. The series is set in 2020, in the early days of the COVID-19 pandemic.

== Release ==
The trailer was released on July 7, 2022. The first two episodes of the series premiered on Amazon Freevee on August 19, 2022, and then two episodes were released weekly, with the season finale on September 15, 2022.

== Reception ==
On the review aggregator website Rotten Tomatoes, 82% of 11 critics' reviews are positive, with an average rating of 6.8/10. The website's consensus reads: "Sprung's pandemic setting is sometimes more of a drag than a springboard for fresh ideas, but this bouncy sitcom bears all the genial hallmarks of creator Greg Garcia's comedic touch -- complete with a hilarious Martha Plimpton." Metacritic, which uses a weighted average, assigned the film a score of 73 out of 100, based on 6 critics, indicating "generally favorable" reviews.
