= Abby Ellis =

American documentary filmmaker

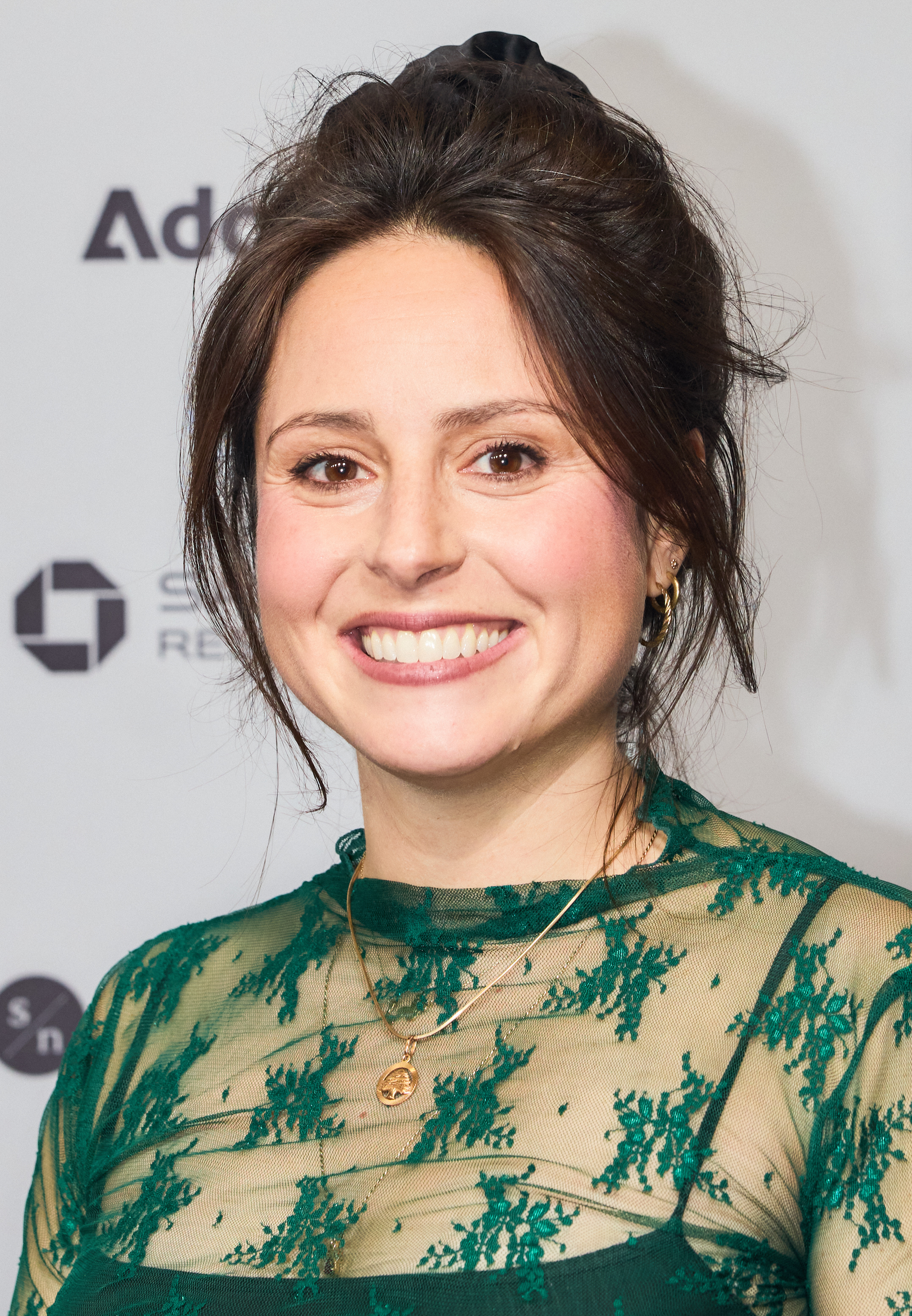
- Born: Grand Rapids, Michigan, U.S.
- Occupations: Director, journalist, editor, cinematographer
- Years active: 2012–present

Abby Ellis is an American documentary filmmaker, journalist, editor, and cinematographer. In 2023, she was named to DOC NYC's "40 Under 40" list and won a Peabody Award.

== Life and career ==
Abby graduated with a Bachelor of Arts degree in film from the University of Utah in 2011 and has taught as an adjunct professor at the university. She began her career at VICE as an editor, where she developed, produced, and edited several of the network’s shows, including Vice (TV series) on HBO. She has contributed to PBS Frontline as a producer and director. She later served as Filmmaker-in-Residence at PBS, where she produced and directed three films. Prior to that, she developed and produced a six-part series on inequality in America Divided alongside Norman Lear, Shonda Rhimes, and Common.

Abby’s Frontline directing credits include Flint’s Deadly Water (2019) and Shots Fired (2021). In 2022, she earned her a nomination for the Livingston Award. Her 2026 feature documentary, The Lake (2026), premiered at the Sundance Film Festival, where it received the Special Jury Prize.

== Selected filmography ==
Year	Title	Contribution	Note
2016	America Divided	Producer	5 Episodes
2017	American Patriot	Producer	Documentary
2019	Flint’s Deadly Water	Director and writer	Documentary
2021	Shots Fired	Director, writer, cinematographer and producer	Documentary
2026	The Lake	Director, editor, cinematographer and producer	Documentary

== Accolades ==
Year	Result	Award	Category	Work	Ref.
2020	Won	Scripps Howard Awards	National/International Coverage	Flint’s Deadly Water	
2020	Nominated	News and Documentary Emmy Awards	Outstanding Investigative Documentary	Flint’s Deadly Water	
2026	Won	Sundance Film Festival	U.S. Documentary Special Jury Award	The Lake	
