= The Lake (2026 film) =

2026 documentary film by Abby Ellis

- Directed by: Abby Ellis
- Produced by: Fletcher Keyes; Abby Ellis
- Cinematography: Alex Takats; Abby Ellis
- Edited by: Abby Ellis; Emelie Mahdavian
- Music by: Natalia Tsupryk
- Production companies: Sandbox Films; Ibis Films; Little Monster Films; Cranium Productions; Appian Way Productions
- Release date: January 22, 2026 (Sundance Film Festival)
- Running time: 93 minutes
- Country: United States
- Language: English

The Lake is a 2026 American documentary film directed by Abby Ellis. It investigates the ecological collapse of the Great Salt Lake in Utah and the race by scientists and politicians to prevent an "environmental nuclear bomb."

The film is executive produced by Jimmy Chin, Chai Vasarhelyi, and Leonardo DiCaprio. It premiered in the U.S. Documentary Competition at the 2026 Sundance Film Festival.

== Premise ==
The documentary chronicles the existential threat facing the Great Salt Lake, examining the inextricable fates of the ecosystem and the millions of people living in the surrounding region. It follows two intrepid scientists and a political insider who are "racing the clock" to save their home from catastrophe, capturing the perspectives of agricultural providers, political leaders, and the local community.

== Production ==
The film is directed by Abby Ellis, a Peabody and Emmy-nominated filmmaker and journalist who is a local to Utah. It is produced by Fletcher Keyes and Ellis.

The project features a high-profile executive producing team including Jimmy Chin and Chai Vasarhelyi (directors of Free Solo) via their Little Monster Films banner, and Leonardo DiCaprio via Appian Way Productions, alongside Sandbox Films. The film was edited by Ellis and filmmaker Emelie Mahdavian (director of Bitterbrush), who also serves as a co-executive producer.

== Release ==
The Lake was announced as part of the U.S. Documentary Competition at the 2026 Sundance Film Festival on December 10, 2025.

== Reception ==
=== Critical response ===
On the review aggregator website Rotten Tomatoes, 100% of 11 critics' reviews are positive, with an average rating of 7.3/10.

Jordan Raup of The Film Stage wrote, "While The Lake is effective in illuminating a vital issue with astounding, haunting cinematography from Ellis and DP Alex Takats, the film also functions as a sobering example of failed political leadership on a larger scale."

=== Accolades ===
The Lake won the Special Jury Award for Impact for Change in the U.S. Documentary Competition at Sundance.
