= Gloria J. Browne-Marshall =

American lawyer and activist

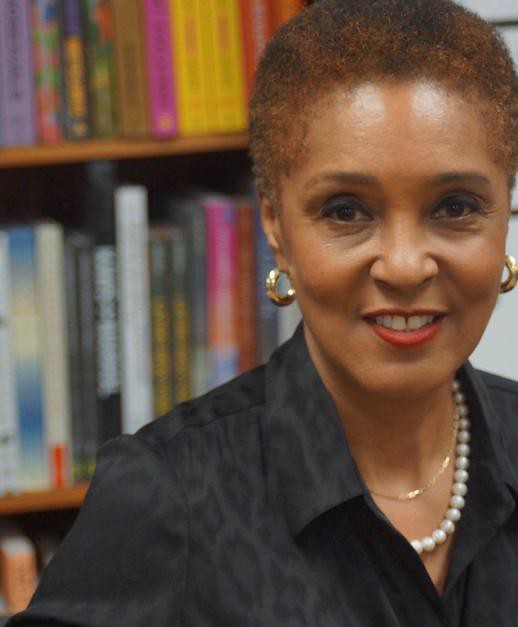
- Browne-Marshall photographed by John Mathew Smith in 2026 at the Politics and Prose Bookstore in Washington, D.C.
- Born: December 31, 1959 (age 66)
- Education: University of Missouri at Columbia; Saint Louis University; University of Pennsylvania
- Occupations: Civils rights attorney, correspondent, playwright, activist

Gloria Jene Browne-Marshall (born December 31, 1959) is an American civil rights attorney, legal correspondent, author, playwright, essayist, and racial justice activist.

She is a professor of Constitutional Law at CUNY's John Jay College of Criminal Justice and previously taught Africana Studies at Vassar.

As a legal commentator, she has spoken on various Supreme Court decisions, impeachments of Donald Trump, and constitutional questions about civilian deaths, criminal law, and racial justice. She has been interviewed in this capacity on CNN, NPR, BBC, MSNBC, CBS, and WVON.

As of 2025, she is the president of New Jersey-based activist group Rally Forward. Since an unknown year, she hosts New York radio station WBAI's Law of the Land program, broadcast on Tuesday mornings.

== Early life and education ==
Gloria Jene Browne was born on December 31, 1959 to the federal employee Ardythe Marie Bradshaw and William Miles Browne of Kansas City, Missouri. They filed for divorce in an unknown year.

She graduated the University of Missouri at Columbia, received a Juris Doctor degree from Saint Louis University, and received a master's degree in government from the University of Pennsylvania.

== Writing ==
In the fall of 1999, her play Killing Me Softly premiered at the Billie Holiday Theatre in Brooklyn. It is a two-act courtroom drama and murder mystery, set in 1980s Kansas City.

Her 2021 play, SHOT: Caught a Soul, focuses on the aftermath of the murder of an unarmed teen by a police officer. The 30-minute drama was produced by Law and Policy Group, Inc. and the Pulitzer Center and directed by Jeffrey V. Thompson. The play was received positively by The St. Louis American.

== Work and activism ==
Circa 2000, she was an assistant counsel in the education section of Manhattan's NAACP Legal Defense and Education Fund. She also was an adjunct lecturer on civil and human rights at Vassar College in Poughkeepsie.

In 2017, she was a keynote speaker during CEMOTAP's 30-year anniversary celebration in St. Albans, New York.

In 2023, Newsweek published her article, "Divided Nation: New Monuments to Emmett Till; New Racism in Textbooks".

On February 17, 2025, Browne-Marshall was among the organizers of a bus trip from Newark to Washington, D.C. to protest policies and budget cuts proposed by the Trump administration, such as attacks on diversity, equity, and inclusion and affirmative action. The trip occurred in collaboration between the Newark NAACP and the People's Organization for Progress, chaired by Newark activist Lawrence Hamm.

== Memberships and honors ==
She received the Ida B. Wells-Barnett Justice Award "for her work with civil rights, social justice and women’s equality issues" and Wiley University's Women of Excellence in Law award.

In 2024, Browne-Marshall wrote and hosted Your Democracy, an animated series about the U.S. Constitution. The series was produced by WHYY-FM, a PBS/NPR affiliate in Philadelphia. The show has since won an Emmy as well as a Silver Gavel Award from the American Bar Association.

She is a member of the Dramatists Guild of America, Mystery Writers of America, National Association of Black Journalists, PEN America, Society of Professional Journalists, the American Bar Association, Authors Guild, Alpha Kappa Alpha, the National Bar Association, and the National Press Club.

== Publications ==
- Race, Law, and American Society: 1607 to Present (2007)
- The Voting Rights War: The NAACP and the Ongoing Struggle for Justice (2016)
- She Took Justice: The Black Woman, Law, and Power – 1619 to 1969 (2021)
- A Protest History of the United States (2025)

== Personal life ==
She has competed in the New York City Marathon.

In 2000, she married Ernie Marshall at the Sandals Resort in Montego Bay, Jamaica. Ernie is a graduate of Baruch College who (as of 2000) ran an accounting firm in Manhattan. Ernie is the son of Elizabeth T. Marshall and Maxie L. Marshall II, and a cousin of U.S. Supreme Court justice Thurgood Marshall.
