= Ro Haber =

American screenwriter

- Occupations: Filmmaker, producer, screenwriter, director
- Years active: 2013–present
- Notable work: New Deep South: House of JXN, Jellyfish, Empowered, Relapse, Ink

Ro Haber (Note: Haber is credited professionally as Rosie Haber at least through 2018.) is a transgender writer and director of commercial, music, and documentary films based in Los Angeles, California. They attended NYU's Tisch School of the Arts. In 2013, they were selected for the Outfest 2013 Screenwriters Lab for their feature screenplay Soledad. In 2014 their short Jellyfish won Outfest's Grand Jury Prize. Their works have gained popularity and recognition for their work exploring LGBTQ life in a number of different styles and formats. These works include films like Relapse (2015), We've Been Around (2016), Ink (2016), as well as documentary works like New Deep South (2017), Stonewall Forever (2019) and PRIDE: Ep 106, Y2GAY (2021) .

They have also been recognized for their work and have subsequently been granted funding from a number of different fellowship programs for emerging filmmakers. Among these are fellowships in Sundance's New Frontier Lab (2017) as well as the Sundance Momentum Fellowship (2018), Film Independent's Episodic Lab, Outfest's Screenwriting lab, and also the American Film Institute's Directing workshop for women that was created to expose emerging filmmakers to a larger studio audience.

== Popularity of New Deep South ==
New Deep South, a film series directed by Haber and Lauren Cioffi, has grown in popularity since debuting in 2015. The series aims to showcase the lives of the LGBTQ community in the southern United States by following real members of the community and detailing their experiences. The three-piece series has been nominated for multiple awards and individual episodes have also received recognition. Episode 2, "Kayla", was awarded a Webby Award in 2017 for Best Documentary: Individual Episode.

== Additional work ==
Their recent projects include Braddock, PA, a documentary that takes a look at the lives of those in working-class Middle America. This piece focuses on the industry life of those working in small towns and explores the relationship between the people and the environmental impact of their towns. As of 2018, they are working on developing a television show aimed at young adults. Chingonas will feature elements of horror and is being developed in Film Independent's Episodic Lab.

== Awards ==
In addition to the fellowships they have been granted, Ro Haber has been presented with a number of awards at both the national and international level.

Award	Year
GLAAD Award for Best Documentary (nominated), NY, New York	2017
Audience Award at the New Orleans Film Festival, New Orleans, LA	2016
Audience Award at the Los Angeles Film Festival, Los Angeles, CA	2016
Grand Jury Prize for Best Dramatic Short - Outfest Film Festival	2014

== Filmography ==
Year	Title	Role
2013	Jellyfish	Director and screenplay
2015	Empowered	Producer
2015	Relapse	Director and screenplay
2016	Ink	Director
2017	New Deep South: House of JXN	Director and screenplay
2025	We Are Pat	Director

== See also ==
- List of transgender film and television directors
