= Clean Slate (TV series) =

2025 American TV series

- Genre: Comedy
- Created by: Laverne Cox; George Wallace; Dan Ewen
- Showrunners: Simran Baidwan; Dan Ewen
- Starring: Laverne Cox; George Wallace; Jay Wilkison; Norah Murphy; D.K. Uzoukwu; Telma Hopkins; Phillip Garcia
- Composer: Pierre Charles
- Country of origin: United States
- Original language: English
- No. of seasons: 1
- No. of episodes: 8

Production
- Executive producers: Laverne Cox; George Wallace; Dan Ewen; Simran Baidwan; Norman Lear; Brent Miller
- Producer: Paul Hilepo
- Production companies: Act III Productions; Laverne Cox Productions; Amazon MGM Studios; Sony Pictures Television

Original release
- Network: Amazon Prime Video
- Release: February 6, 2025

Clean Slate is an American sitcom co-created by and starring Laverne Cox and George Wallace. The show centers on a woman (Cox) reuniting with her father (Wallace), whom she has not seen since her gender transition. The series premiered on Prime Video on February 6, 2025, and received positive reception. In April 2025, the series was canceled after one season.

== Synopsis ==
The series follows Desiree (Cox), a 40-year-old who's returning to her small town in Alabama to reunite with her father Harry (Wallace) after 23 years away. Harry is excited to reunite with his son, and he has no idea that son is now Desiree—a proud trans woman.

== Cast ==
- Laverne Cox as Desiree Slate, a trans woman reuniting with her father, Harry, in her small Alabama hometown after 23 years away
- George Wallace as Harry Slate, a car wash owner and Desiree's father
- Jay Wilkison as Mack, one of Harry's employees
- Norah Murphy as Opal, Mack's daughter
- D.K. Uzoukwu as Louis, Desiree's childhood best friend and the church choir director
- Telma Hopkins as Ella, Louis' mother
- Phillip Garcia as Miguel, Harry's neighbor

== Episodes ==
No. overall	No. in season	Title	Directed by	Written by	Original release date
1	1	"Desiree. And Whatnot."	Nisha Ganatra	Teleplay by : Dan Ewen; Story by : Laverne Cox & George Wallace & Dan Ewen	February 6, 2025
After 23 years away living as an artist in New York City, Desiree returns home to Alabama to repair her estranged relationship with her old-school father, Harry. Together, they must process their new reality as father and daughter.
2	2	"Spark Joy"	Matthew A. Cherry	Dan Ewen	February 6, 2025
Desiree throws a yard sale to purge her childhood home of unnecessary clutter, with unintended consequences. Louis keeps Harry busy with a game-day feast. Desiree and Jay begin a friendship. Desiree makes Louis a Grindr account.
3	3	"Opal's Day Off"	Randall Keenan Winston	Shadi Petosky & Jasmine Pierce	February 6, 2025
4	4	"Chrome Jesus"	Keith Powell	Simran Baidwan & Shantira Jackson	February 6, 2025
5	5	"Closer Than They Appear"	Jett Garrison	Simran Baidwan & Dan Ewen	February 6, 2025
6	6	"Pillars"	Princess Monique Filmz	Brittany Miller & Shomari Kirkwood	February 6, 2025
7	7	"Mess and Magic"	Linda Mendoza	Amos Mac & Walter Kelly	February 6, 2025
8	8	"Born Again... Again"	Zackary Drucker	Simran Baidwan & Shantira Jackson	February 6, 2025

== Production ==
=== Development ===
The series was originally announced by Peacock in January 2020 with Laverne Cox and George Wallace starring in leading roles. Cox and Wallace are the creators and executive producers of the series with Dan Ewen. Ewen serves as a showrunner of the series with executive producer Simran Baidwan. Norman Lear executive produced via his Act III Productions, along with Brent Miller. It was one of the last series produced by Norman Lear prior to his death in 2023. Paul Hilepo is a producer of the series. Nisha Ganatra directed the series pilot.

In February 2021, the series moved to IMDb TV (now known as Amazon Freevee). In September 2022, Amazon Freevee gave the series order. In December 2024, the series was announced to be moving from Amazon Freevee to Amazon Prime Video.

=== Casting ===
In March 2023, it was announced that D.K. Uzoukwu, Telma Hopkins, Jay Wilkison and Norah Murphy joined the cast as series regulars alongside Cox and Wallace.

=== Filming ===
The series was filmed largely in Georgia.

== Release ==
The series premiered on February 6, 2025, on Prime Video. It was cancelled in April after one season. Though no explanation was given, some media outlets speculated that its cancellation might be related to the second presidency of Donald Trump.

== Reception ==
On the review aggregator website Rotten Tomatoes, 87% of 31 critics' reviews are positive, with an average rating of 7.1/10. The website's consensus reads: "Like the sitcoms of yore, this new age Norman Lear production boasts an uplifting, heart-filled world in tune with the stylish workings of the one and only, Laverne Cox." In a positive review, Barry Levitt wrote in The Daily Beast, "Clean Slate wisely challenges common conceptions of the American South...This Alabama town is filled with people who love Jesus, of course, but they also love family and everything in between. Not everyone in town is eager to embrace Desiree, but the vast majority of locals welcome her like she’s their own daughter." After noting the cultural relevance of a show about trans people "debuting at a moment when the current presidential administration is aggressively stripping trans people of their rights," Alan Sepinwall of Rolling Stone described the show as "content to be a simple, relatively old-fashioned family and friends comedy. But centering a sitcom like that around a trans character feels like an act of bold political protest, even if nobody meant it that way." Michele Theil wrote for PinkNews that Laverne Cox is Clean Slate's "shining star."

In a less positive review, Daniel Feinberg described the series in The Hollywood Reporter as "more of a fantasy of societal understanding than an issue-oriented comedy, very rarely producing laughs but very frequently generating reasonably earned warm-fuzzies."
