= Act III Communications =

American media holding company founded by Norman Lear

- Type: Privately held
- Industry: Mass media
- Founded: 1985; 41 years ago
- Founder: Norman Lear
- Headquarters: Beverly Hills, California; United States
- Key people: Norman Lear (Chairman); Hal Gaba (CEO)
- Products: Film; Television; Theater

Act III Communications is an American media and entertainment company owned by the estate of producer and screenwriter Norman Lear. It was founded in 1985 following Lear's sale of Embassy Communications and Tandem Productions to The Coca-Cola Company. In a 1988 interview in The Wall Street Journal, Lear explained the name by noting that in a Shakespeare play, there are always more than three acts and that he expects there to be an Act IV and V. Unlike his previous production companies, Lear would initially not use Act III for simply just film and television production and also used it to delve into bigger business ventures, using Act III to own additional businesses such as a theater chain, a magazine division and the acquisition of eight Fox affiliate tv stations. Act III served as Lear's business vehicle, unconnected to his other activities as a political activist and philanthropist.

== Act III notable investments and ventures ==
Among the many activities of Act III Communications is a minority interest in Village Roadshow Pictures (VRP); ownership interest in Concord Music Group (later merged with VRP to create Village Roadshow Entertainment Group); Act III Broadcasting; Act III Theatres; Act III Publishing; and Act III Television, a joint venture formed with Columbia Pictures Television in February 1989; and Act III Merchandising which handles the merchandising for The Princess Bride among other properties. Act III Broadcasting was divested for approximately $500 million in June 1995 to ABRY Partners; Act III Theatres was divested to KKR in 1997 for just under $700 million, while Concord Music Group was divested in 2013 to Wood Creek Capital for $115 million. Act III/Lear continues to own the two Rob Reiner-directed films it produced, Stand By Me and The Princess Bride. Act III/Lear continues to hold an interest in Village Roadshow Pictures/Village Roadshow Entertainment Group.

== Village Roadshow Pictures ==
Through a group led by Act III Communications, in January 2006, Norman Lear and his then-partner Hal Gaba purchased 50% of Village Roadshow Pictures (VRP), the Los Angeles-based, U.S. film production arm of Village Roadshow Limited, one of Australia's leading entertainment and media companies. Their entity, Crescent Film Group, included long-time colleague Michael Lambert through Lambert Media Group and Clarity Partners as investors. Crescent invested $115 million for its interest in VRP. The Australian parent, Village Roadshow Limited (VRL) also operates movie theaters; film production and distribution in Australia; TV and Video distribution; radio stations; and theme parks including "Warner Movie World." VRP co-produces and/or co-finances 6-8 movies per year. Historically a long-term partner with Warner Brothers, VRP moved its distribution to Sony Pictures in 2014. VRP's library includes films such as The Great Gatsby, Winter's Tale, The Lego Movie, the Matrix trilogy, Miss Congeniality, Training Day, Ocean's Eleven and its sequels, Charlie and the Chocolate Factory, and others. This interest has been diluted with subsequent expansion and re-capitalizations of VRP but remains a significant interest for Act III. Village Roadshow Pictures used the $115 million invested by Crescent to repay an inter-company loan of $100 million owed to its parent company, as well as pay a $15 million dividend to the existing VRP shareholders and management.

== Concord Music Group ==
Norman Lear was also chairman emeritus of the Concord Music Group (aka Concord Records), one of the world's largest independent record and music publishing companies, which was acquired by Lear and his associate Hal Gaba in 1999 and divested to Wood Creek Capital in 2013. Concord is one of the leading producers and distributors of classic and contemporary Jazz musicians and also owns the legendary Stax label, which it acquired in 2004 as part of the Fantasy Records acquisition.

Concord was acquired as a labor of love at the urging of Lear's long-time associate and then-CEO of Act III Communications, Hal Gaba. Gaba was CEO of Act III from late 1990, when he succeeded Tom McGrath, until his death in 2009. Gaba had long dreamed of owning a record company, and in 1999, he developed the Concorde opportunity.

The Concord Music Group had/has an extensive roster of household name artists that includes one of Gaba's favorite singers, who was also a personal friend - Frank Sinatra (Gaba produced a live tribute show regarding Frank Sinatra that included marrying archival film footage with live performances called Sinatra, His Voice, His World that played Radio City Music Hall). Other artists on Concord's labels include Ray Charles, Ella Fitzgerald, Thelonious Monk, Chick Corea, John Coltrane, Miles Davis, Sergio Mendes, and Creedence Clearwater Revival. Concord Records started a relationship with Starbucks in 2003 that reached a high point with the release of Genius Loves Company, Ray Charles' last recording. The album went on to win 8 Grammy Awards, including Album of the Year.

In early 2007, Concord and Starbucks launched a joint venture record label – Hear Music. With guaranteed distribution at thousands of Starbucks stores, the label attracted Paul McCartney, who left EMI for the new label. James Taylor, John Mellencamp, and Joni Mitchell all recorded for Hear Music before the partnership was terminated by Starbucks, which was reacting to the general decline in physical sales of recorded music that made the label unprofitable.

== Village Roadshow Entertainment Group ==
In 2008, Concord Music Group merged into Village Roadshow Pictures to form Village Roadshow Entertainment Group (VREG). Investors in VREG included the shareholders of Crescent, as shown above, as well as Australia's Village Roadshow Limited and Tailwind Capital. Concord Music Group was sold to Wood Creek Capital, an affiliate of MassMutual, in 2013 for approximately $120 million.

== Film productions ==
- Stand by Me (1986) – distributed by Columbia Pictures
- The Princess Bride (1987) – distributed by 20th Century Fox
- Breaking In (1989) – distributed by The Samuel Goldwyn Company
- Pyrates (1991) – distributed by Act III Communications
- Fried Green Tomatoes (1991) – distributed by Universal Pictures

== Theater productions ==
- Arsenic and Old Lace (play, comedy, revival) – produced by Act III Productions (June 26, 1986 – January 3, 1987), starring Jean Stapleton and Tony Roberts; opened on Broadway following a national tour

== Television productions ==
- Amazing Grace – (1990) PBS (funding only)
- Sunday Dinner – (1991) CBS (6 episodes)
- The Powers That Be – (1992–1993) NBC (21 episodes)
- 704 Hauser – (1994) CBS (6 episodes)
- Channel Umptee-3 (animated) – (1997–1998) WB (13 episodes)
- Tait Stages – (2013) AXS TV (13 episodes)
- America Divided (miniseries) – (2016) Epix (5 episodes)
- One Day at a Time – (2017–2020) Netflix/Pop (46 episodes)
- Good Times: Black Again (animated) – (2024) Netflix (10 episodes)
- Clean Slate – (2025) Amazon Prime Video (8 episodes)

== Shareholders ==
Act III was initially formed by Lear as a 100% controlled investment and management vehicle for his post-Embassy Communications business activities. In January 1989, Tractebel S.A., a large Belgian utility company with interests in Cable TV in Europe, acquired a 20% equity stake in Act III Communications for $30 million, placing a value on the start-up venture's equity of $150 million. Tractebel was headed by Baron Philippe Bodson, who oversaw the formation of Tractebell from the merger of Tractionel and Electrobel. Société Générale de Belgique (SGB) holds 50.3% of Tractebel's stock. SGB, Belgium's largest holding company, is in turn controlled by France's Suez-Lyonnaise, the holding giant formed by the merger of Compagnie de Suez and Lyonnaise des Eaux in early 1997. Tractebel sold its shares back to Act III and related parties in 1991.

== Theater purchase controversy ==
In November 1992, a lawsuit was filed by the Plitt Amusement Company which alleged that Act III “induced and persuaded” GE Capital Corporate Finance, which financed both Plitt and Act III, to deny them a loan in 1990, with Act III then illegally purchasing a large number of theaters in the Pacific Northwest and creating a monopoly in the process. According to Plitt, the loan which they were denied following Act III's meddling had gotten approved financing from GE.
