= Brent Miller (producer) =

American television and film producer

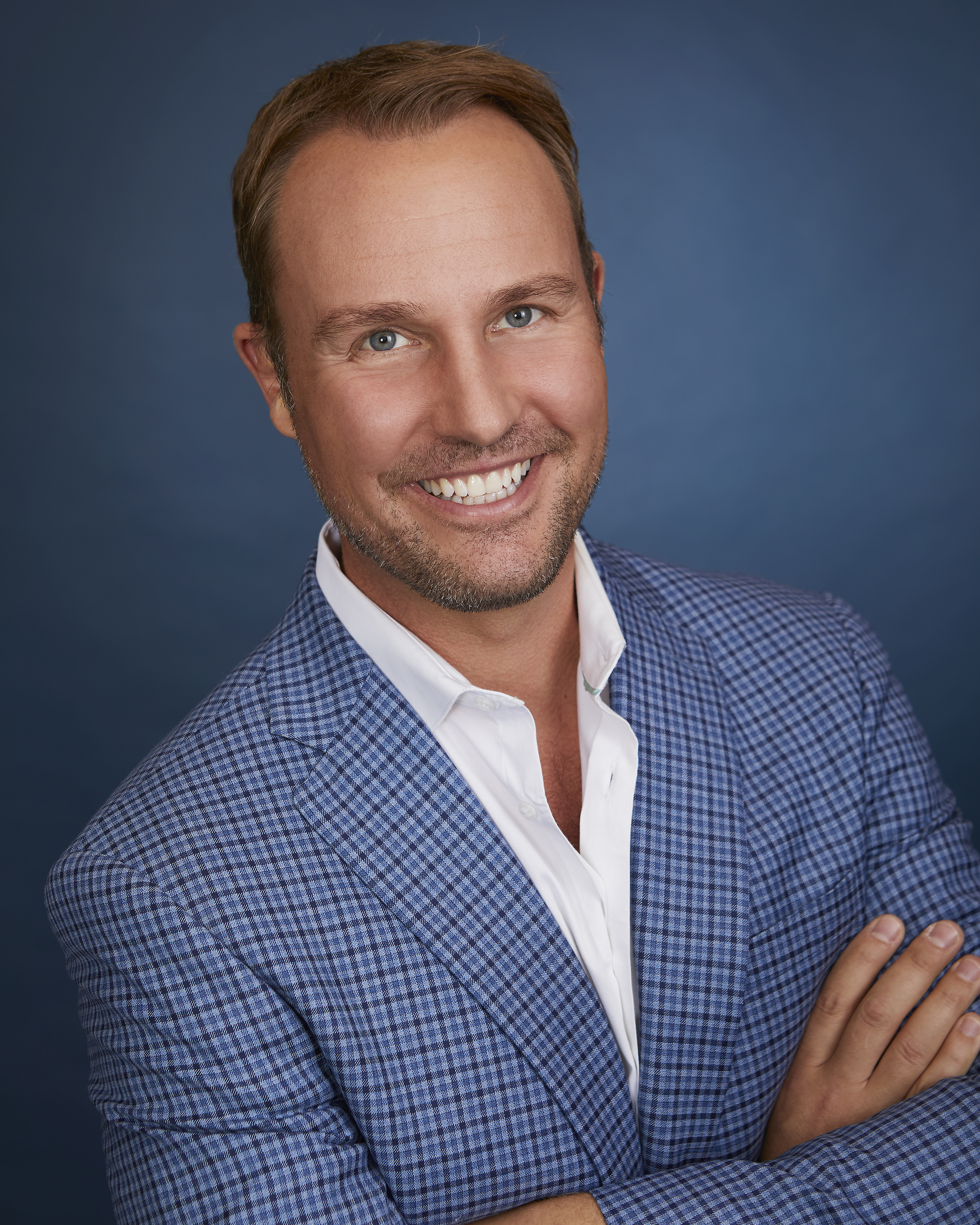
- Born: Toledo, Ohio
- Education: Bowling Green State University
- Occupations: Film producer, television producer
- Years active: 1998 - present
- Organization(s): Act III Productions; Sony Pictures Television

Brent Miller is an American television and film producer, best known for the Netflix series One Day at a Time and the documentary feature Norman Lear: Just Another Version of You. He served as President of production for Act III Productions.

== Early life and education ==
Miller was born and raised in Toledo, Ohio. He attended Bowling Green State University. After he graduated, Miller moved to Los Angeles.

== Career ==
Miller began his career in the event planning industry. He was hired to plan a series of events for Norman Lear’s 85th birthday and was subsequently offered a position at Lear's multimedia holding company, Act III Productions. With Lear, Miller co-produced the Declare Yourself Unofficial Presidential Inaugural Ball in 2009.

In 2012, he co-produced a short film called The Photographs of Your Junk (Will Be Publicized!). In 2013, he created and executive produced the AXS TV documentary series Tait Stages, which followed the employees of Tait Towers and their clients, such as Kelly Clarkson and Linkin Park, and the behind-the-scenes of designing and building large scale touring stage sets.

In 2016, he co-produced his debut documentary feature film Norman Lear: Just Another Version of You. The film was nominated for a Primetime Emmy Award for Outstanding Documentary or Nonfiction Series. That same year, Miller co-executive produced the first season of the Epix documentary series America Divided. He served as executive producer for the second season.

Miller was co-executive producer for the reboot of the 1975 CBS sitcom One Day at a Time. The reboot, focused on a Cuban American family led by a female Army veteran, began production for Netflix in 2016. The show aired for three seasons on Netflix, while season four was picked up by Pop TV in 2020.

In 2018, the executive produced the NBC pilot Guess Who Died, written by Norman Lear and Peter Tolan. In 2019, Miller executive produced the TV special, Live in Front of a Studio Audience: Norman Lear's All in the Family and The Jeffersons, earning him his second Primetime Emmy nomination and first win. He also executive produced the second installment, Live in Front of a Studio Audience: All in the Family and Good Times, which aired in December 2019.

In 2024, Miller signed a first-look deal with Sony Pictures Television to develop series and motion pictures through his company, A House on Brame Productions.

== Filmography ==
=== Film ===
Year	Title	Role	Notes
2011	The Photographs of Your Junk (Will Be Publicized!)	Executive producer	Short film
2016	Norman Lear: Just Another Version of You	Producer	Documentary
2021	Rita Moreno: Just a Girl Who Decided to Go for It	Producer	Documentary

=== Television ===
Year	Title	Role	Notes
2000	Passions	Bellhop	Episode: #1.165
2000	Resurrection Blvd.	Waiter	Episode: "El Regreso de Paco"
2001	Arrest & Trial	Officer	Episode: "White Collar Criminal"
2004	Super Bowl XXXVIII	Talent coordinator	Television special
2004	2004 MTV Movie Awards	Talent coordinator	Television special
2004	2004 MTV Video Music Awards	Talent coordinator	Television special
2004	2004 NFL Opening Kickoff	Talent coordinator	Television special
2005	Super Bowl XXXIX	Casting associate	Television special
2005	NFL Opening Kickoff 2005	Talent coordinator	Television special
2006	American Music Awards of 2006	Talent coordinator	Television special
2013	Tait Stages	Executive producer, Story producer, producer	13 episodes
2016	American Masters	Producer	Episode: "Norman Lear: Just Another Version of You"; Nominated – Primetime Emmy Award for Outstanding Documentary or Nonfiction Series
2017–20	One Day at a Time	Co-executive producer, Executive producer	Streaming/television series (46 episodes)
2016–18	America Divided	Co-executive producer, Executive producer	
2018	Guess Who Died	Executive producer	Television pilot
2019–21	Live in Front of a Studio Audience	Executive producer	Television specials (3 specials)
2022	Norman Lear: 100 Years of Music and Laughter	Executive producer	Television special
2025	Clean Slate	Executive producer	Streaming series (8 episodes)

== Awards and nominations ==
Year	Nominee / work	Award	Result
2017	American Masters	Primetime Emmy Award for Outstanding Documentary or Nonfiction Series	Nominated
2018	One Day at a Time	Peabody Award	Nominated
2018	One Day at a Time	Television Academy Honors	Won
2018	One Day at a Time	Television Critics Association Award for Outstanding Achievement in Comedy	Nominated
2019	Live in Front of a Studio Audience	Primetime Emmy Award for Outstanding Variety Special (Live)	Won
2020	One Day at a Time	Imagen Awards	Won
2020	One Day at a Time	Critics' Choice Television Awards	Won
2020	Live in Front of a Studio Audience	Primetime Emmy Award for Outstanding Variety Special (Live)	Won
2022	Live in Front of a Studio Audience	Primetime Emmy Award for Outstanding Variety Special (Live)	Nominated
2023	Live in Front of a Studio Audience	Primetime Emmy Award for Outstanding Variety Special (Pre-Recorded)	Nominated
