= Solly Granatstein =

American television producer

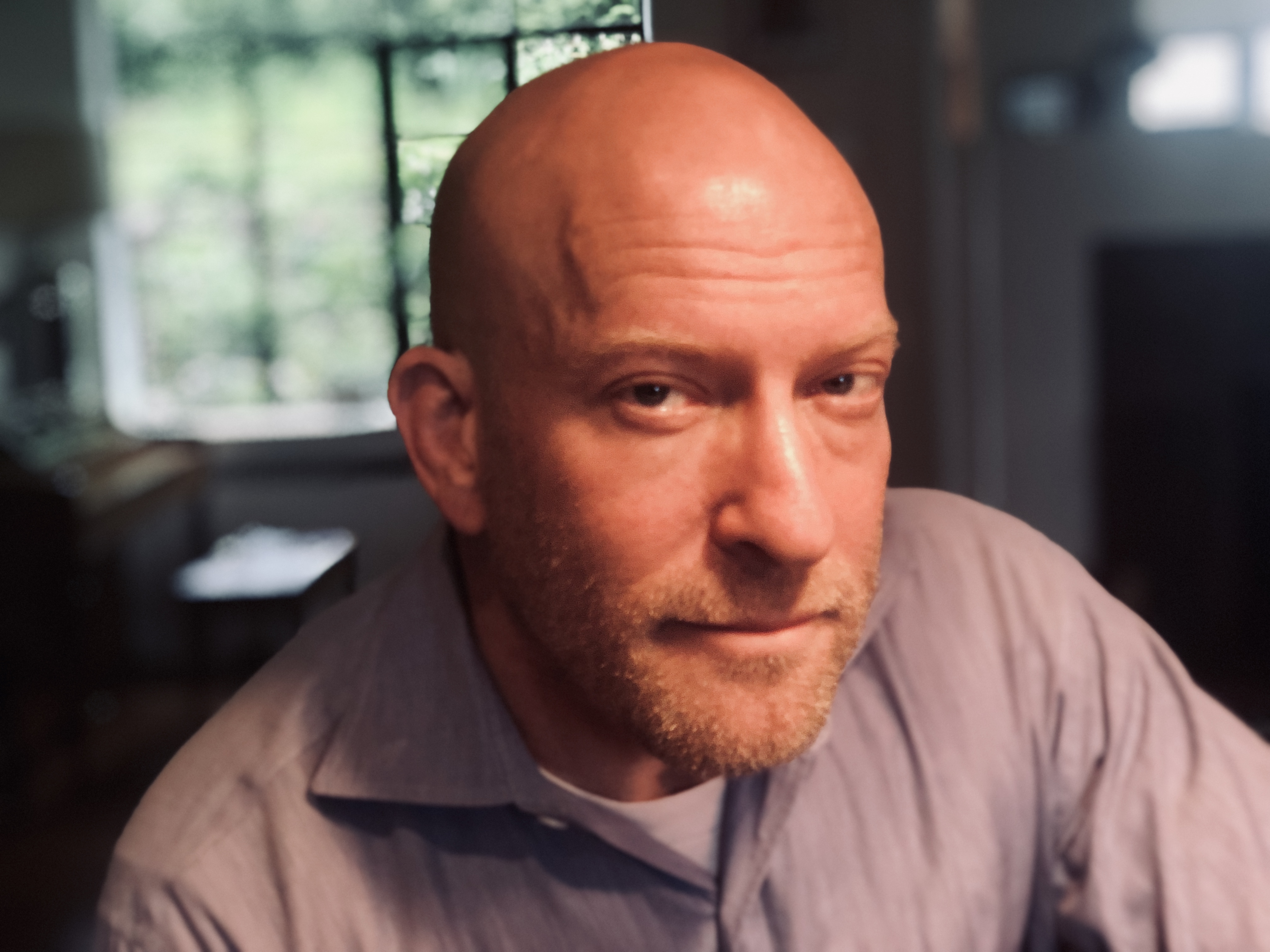
Solly Granatstein

Solly Granatstein is an American television producer and director, and currently the executive producer and show-runner of FBI True on Paramount Plus. He is formerly with CBS 60 Minutes, NBC News and ABC News. He is co-creator, along with Lucian Read and Richard Rowley, of "America Divided", a documentary series about inequality, and was co-executive producer of Years of Living Dangerously Season 1. He is the winner of twelve Emmys, a Peabody, a duPont, two Polks, four Investigative Reporters and Editors awards, including the IRE medal, and virtually every other major award in broadcast journalism. He is also the screenwriter, with Vince Beiser, of The Great Antonio, an upcoming film, developed by Steven Soderbergh and Warner Brothers.

He graduated from Brandeis University in 1990 and Columbia University School of Journalism, in 1994 and in 2016 was the recipient of the school's Alumni Award.

== Awards ==
- 2006 and 2009 Emmys for "The Sea Gypsies," "Aftershock" and "The Wasteland"
- 2008 and 2009 Investigative Reporters & Editors for "The Death of Timothy Souders" and "The Wasteland"
- 2008 George Foster Peabody Award, for "The Killings in Haditha"
- 2010 George Polk Award for "The Wasteland"
- 2009 Gerald Loeb Award for Television Enterprise for "The Wasteland"
- 2009 Edward R. Murrow for "The Wasteland"
- 2009 Sigma Delta Chi for "The Wasteland"
- 2010 Media in Liberty for "Congo Gold"
- 2010 Emmy for "The Winter Of Our Hardship" and "The Long Recession"
- 2010 Alfred I. duPont-Columbia University Silver Baton for "The Blowout"
- 2011 Emmy for "The Lost Children of Haiti"
- 2011 Two Emmys for "The Blowout"
- 2012 National Headliner Award for "Inside Mexico's Drug War"
- 2014 Digiday Video Award, Best Branded Video Destination, for "Women Inmates"
- 2014 MediaPost Communications Online Media Marketing & Advertising Award, Native Advertising: Single Execution, for "Women Inmates"
- 2014 Primetime Emmy Award, Outstanding Documentary or Non-Fiction Series, for Years of Living Dangerously
- 2014 Investigative Reporters & Editors medal for "The Real Death Valley"
- 2014 George Polk Award for "The Real Death Valley"
- 2014 Sigma Delta Chi for "The Real Death Valley"
- 2014 Society for Professional Journalists New America Award for "The Real Death Valley"
- 2015 Emmy for "Muriendo Por Cruzar"
- 2016 Transforming America Award from Demos (U.S. think tank) for "America Divided"
- 2016 Columbia University Graduate School of Journalism Alumni Award
- 2017 Gerald Loeb Award for Video for "Cosecha de Miseria (Harvest of Misery) & The Source"
- 2017 Izzy Award for "America Divided"
- 2017 Emmy for "Cosecha de la Miseria"
- 2018 Emmy for "The Source"
- 2019 Emmy for "Hidden Cost"

== Works ==
- "Exodus: The Hunger That Consumes You", The Weather Channel, Jan. 9, 2019
- "Exodus: All We Have Is Poverty and Drought", The Weather Channel, Dec. 19, 2018
- "Hidden Cost", The Weather Channel, May 8, 2018
- "Cruel & Unusual?: The Lethal Toll of Hot Prisons, The Weather Channel and The Marshall Project, Oct. 11, 2017
- "The Source", The Weather Channel, Jan. 19, 2017
- "America Divided: A House Divided", Epix, Sept. 30, 2016
- "America Divided", Epix, Sept. 30, 2016
- "The Real Death Valley", The Weather Channel, Oct. 16, 2014
- "Women Inmates", T Brand Studio, The New York Times, 2014
- "Years of Living Dangerously", Showtime, April 6, 2014
- "The Bomb Maker", Rock Center with Brian Williams, Nov. 14, 2012
- "Help (Not) Wanted", Rock Center with Brian Williams, Nov. 14, 2011
- "Inside Mexico's Drug War", 'Dateline NBC, April. 17, 2011
- "Blowout: The Deepwater Horizon Disaster", 60 Minutes, May 16, 2010
- "Lost Children of Haiti", 60 Minutes, May 21, 2010
- "Wilmington, Ohio's Long Recession", 60 Minutes, Dec. 20, 2009
- "How Gold Pays For Congo's Deadly War", 60 Minutes, Nov. 29, 2009
- "The Winter of Our Hardship", 60 Minutes, Jan. 25, 2009
- "The Wasteland", '60 Minutes, Nov. 9, 2008
- "Who Was Following Whom?", 60 Minutes, Nov. 11, 2008
- "One Thousand Lives A Month", 60 Minutes, Feb. 17, 2008
- "Bombing Afghanistan", 60 Minutes, Oct. 28, 2007
- "The Death of Timothy Souders", 60 Minutes, Feb. 11, 2007
- "Mixed Martial Arts: A New Kind of Fight" 60 Minutes, Dec. 10, 2006 -
