= Tom McGrath (media executive) =

American media executive (born 1956)

- Born: Thomas Berard McGrath; 1956 (age 69–70); Washington, DC
- Education: Harvard University
- Occupation: CEO of Crossroads Live
- Writing career
- Years active: 1980–present
- Notable awards: Tony Award, Drama Desk Award, Olivier Award
- Website: www.xroadslive.com

Thomas Berard McGrath (born 1956) is an American media executive. He is chairman of Crossroads Media, a company that invests in live and location-based entertainment on a global scale. He was formerly the Chairman of Crossroads Live, a global distributor of theatrical entertainment. Previously, the president and COO of STX Entertainment; executive chairman of Key Brand Entertainment, a producer and distributor of live theatre in the United States and parent company of Broadway.com; president and COO of Act III Communications; and executive vice president and COO of Viacom Entertainment Group. He is a nine-time Tony Award-winning producer, member of the National Recording Academy, and board member of the International Academy of Television Arts and Sciences. He also serves as trustee of New England Conservatory of Music and American Repertory Theater at Harvard.

== Early life and education ==
McGrath was born and raised in Washington, DC. He received his B.A. from Harvard University in 1976, where he was music director for Hasty Pudding Theatricals and conductor for the Harvard University Band. He earned his M.B.A. from Harvard Business School in 1980. While at business school, he wrote a thesis on the potential of home video distribution for film distribution.

== Career ==
=== Columbia ===
McGrath began his career in entertainment at Columbia Pictures Industries in 1980. While at Columbia, McGrath established RCA Columbia Home Video and served as senior vice president of corporate development for Coca-Cola, following its acquisition of Columbia in 1982. McGrath also engineered the creation of TriStar Pictures through the conglomeration of Columbia, HBO, and CBS. He led the acquisitions of Embassy Communications from TV producer Norman Lear and Merv Griffin Productions, producers of Wheel of Fortune and Jeopardy!.

=== Act III ===
After serving two years as senior vice president, McGrath was named president and COO of Norman Lear's entertainment company Act III Communications in December 1987. He filled that role until 1990. While at Act III, McGrath expanded its broadcast, publishing, and exhibition operations, worked on television station acquisitions, and financed multiple films, including Stand By Me, The Princess Bride, and Fried Green Tomatoes.

=== Time Warner ===
In the 1990s, McGrath was named President International of Time Warner International Broadcasting. At Time Warner, he created Classic FM, a national radio network in the UK; n-tv, a German-language national cable news channel; and VIVA, a national German music video channel.

=== Viacom ===
McGrath led Viacom's acquisition of Paramount Pictures in the 1990s. He joined Viacom in 1994 as executive vice president and chief operating officer of the Viacom Entertainment Group, where he served until 2004. While at Viacom, McGrath was involved in several musical adaptations of Paramount films, including White Christmas, Footloose and Saturday Night Fever. In February 2002, McGrath was named President of Paramount Enterprises, Viacom's division for non-studio entertainment properties, including Paramount Parks, Canadian cinema chain Famous Players, and United Cinemas International.

=== Key Brand Entertainment ===
From 2008 to 2013, McGrath served as chairman of Key Brand Entertainment, later renamed The John Gore Organization. McGrath led the company's acquisition of Live Nation's theater division in 2008, which included Broadway.com, its group ticket sales division Theatre Direct, and its promotional branch Broadway Across America. Through Broadway Across America, McGrath produced several Broadway shows, including the revivals of Promises, Promises (2009), Hair (2009), and How to Succeed in Business Without Really Trying (2011). In 2013, McGrath joined with Broadway producer Kevin McCollum and film producer John Davis on a development deal with 20th Century Fox, in which they would choose Fox film properties from its library to be adapted into theater productions. Initial projects include Mrs. Doubtfire and The Devil Wears Prada. McGrath has received nine Tony Awards.

=== Crossroads Media ===
McGrath serves as the Chairman of Crossroads Media, a private equity firm that acquires music publishing catalogs. Working with Spectrum Equity Investors, he led the acquisitions of independent music publishing companies, including Bug Music in 2006 and Windswept Holdings in 2007. McGrath served as chairman of Bug Music through its sale to BMG in 2011.

=== STX Entertainment ===
McGrath was the chief operating officer of media company STX Entertainment from its formation in 2014 until May 2019. The company specializes in financing, developing, producing, and distributing mid-tier-budget star-driven films. STX has produced and distributed such films as The Gift, Bad Moms, The Edge of Seventeen, The Foreigner, and Molly's Game.

In April 2018, STX filed for an initial public offering on the Hong Kong Stock Exchange. This was originally reported in 2017 with an estimated market value as high as $3.5bn±.

=== Crossroads Live ===
McGrath was the CEO of Crossroads Live, which produces and tours Broadway musicals in international markets. Crossroads Live invests in multiple live entertainment ventures, including festivals, immersive attractions, musical theatre production and touring, and financial transactions with live entertainment companies and assets. The company also spans across film, television, music, and theme park industries. In 2019, Crossroads Live acquired David Ian Productions, and, in December 2020, the company also acquired the Gordon Frost Organization. Most recently, Crossroads Live produced Mrs. Doubtfire, Company and Almost Famous the Musical.

=== ILP Theatrical ===
In 2024, McGrath partnered with Michael Barra to form ILP Theatrical in association with International Literary Properties. ILP Theatrical provides liquidity for authors of theatrical properties, plays and musicals, including acquisitions, partnerships and administration. Among the initial transactions are the acquisition of the play "Arsenic and Old Lace" and other works by Joseph Kesselring, and the literary works of Langston Hughes.
