= Lawrence Hamm =

American civil rights activist

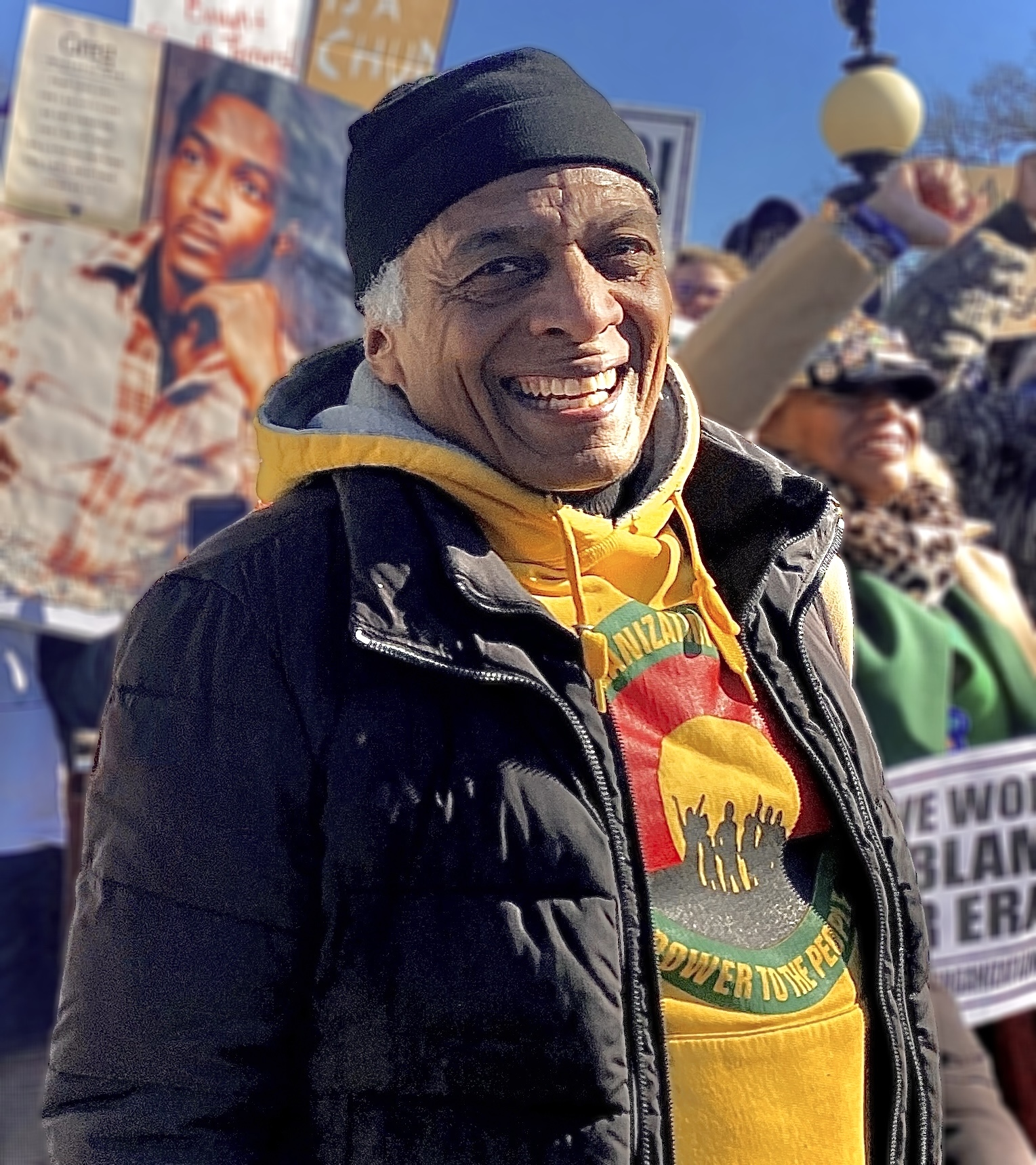
- Hamm during a 2025 President's Day Protest in Washington, D.C.
- Born: December 24, 1954 (age 71); Washington, D.C.
- Other name: Adhimu Chunga
- Years active: 1971–present
- Known for: Civil rights, social justice activism

Lawrence Hamm (born December 24, 1954) is an American civil rights activist from Newark, New Jersey. He is the Chairman and among the founders of the People's Organization for Progress, a grassroots social justice organization active since 1982.

His political platform includes universal health care, living wage, less American imperialism and military spending, reparations for slavery, voting rights, union rights, accountability for police brutality, affordable housing, climate change reversal, and the abolition of poverty. He often cites inspiration from Rev. Dr. Martin Luther King Jr.'s progressive agenda, including the tenets of racial integration, wealth redistribution, and nonviolent civil disobedience.

Hamm assisted as state co-chair for the presidential campaigns of Jesse Jackson in 1988 and Bernie Sanders in 2020. He also ran for Senate in 2020 and 2024.

He successfully campaigned to increase New Jersey's minimum wage to $15 an hour, and for a law requiring the investigation of law-enforcement-related deaths in which was codified in 2019 by Governor Phil Murphy.

== Early life ==
Lawrence Hamm was born on December 24, 1954, to Grayce and Lawrence Sr. in Washington D.C. His mother, Grayce, was a seamstress at a local dry cleaner, and his father, Lawrence, was a truck driver. Hamm's family moved to Newark when he was 4 years old, the same year his father died.

In his youth, he lived with his mother and an aunt at 527 South 12th Street. Each summer, he would travel to Georgia to see relatives via the Silver Meteor Amtrak train, where he had formative experiences with Jim Crow laws. For example, he recalled instances where his family were informed by the conductor that they had to move to the rear of the car mid-trip, as soon crossed train crossed the Mason–Dixon line and laws of segregated travel went into effect.

Hamm graduated from South Seventeenth Street Elementary School.

Hamm was 12 years old during the 1967 Newark riots, the destruction and fires of which he witnessed on his front porch with his grandfather. He recalled the two of them discussing his grandfather's experiences with racist Allied French soldiers while overseas in Germany as a soldier in the Great War.

== Activism ==
During Hamm's first week at Newark Arts High School in the fall of 1967, he witnessed an altercation onstage between the student government president and the principal. The student was dragged away from the podium after repeatedly violating the principal's instructions not to talk about the war in Vietnam. The experience was among many formative experiences that would inspire Hamm to begin organizing.

=== Newark Student Federation ===
Hamm became Student Council President at the Newark Arts High School. He was also captain of both the cross country and track and field teams.

By the time he was a senior, he organized student protests and sit-ins, including those in support of Nelson Mandela's work against apartheid in South Africa.

In 1971, during the Newark teachers' strike, Hamm organized the Newark Student Federation, of which he was the leader and chief negotiator. One of the first events he led was a massive walk out of school, protest march, and sit-in to support their teachers on March 24, 1971. The Student Federation produced a list of 27 demands to the school board, including improvements for school facilities and greater student involvement in decisions that affect their education.

=== School board appointment and service ===
After being impressed with his "clear mind, his desire to be fair and his sense of intergroup dynamics", Newark mayor Kenneth A. Gibson called Hamm, proposing that he join the school Board at the age of 17. Hamm considered the offer, discussing it with a friend, before deciding to accept the responsibility. In June 1971, Mayor Gibson appointed Hamm to the school board of the Newark Public Schools. At the age of 17, he became the youngest school board member in the United States, necessitating that he sacrifice his sports commitments (including cross country and track). Not all members were in support of Hamm's appointment, and some doubted its legality, even though it did fall within policy.

That year, one of Hamm's proposals included the purchase and display of 2,000 Black Liberation flags in Newark schools (which, at the time, had over 80% Black students). Over 400 supporters attended the board meeting in favor of the resolution. Hamm stated that displaying Pan-African flags would "signal a new day of black consciousness and pride among the black students of Newark." He also stated that doing so would not indicate less of allegiance to the American flag, but rather allegiance to themselves. Community reactions varied, as reported by The New York Times. Mayor Gibson expressed discomfort with the resolution, and Republican Essex County senator Milton Waldor called it "bigoted". An unspecified Italian-American group stated that its organization would destroy all Black Liberation flags upon sight.

=== Princeton University ===
In the fall of 1971, he entered Princeton University with a scholarship to study political science, but withdrew to focus on his three-year term on the school board.

Around this time, Amiri Baraka gave Hamm his African name: Adhimu Chunga (Swahili for "important youth").

He returned to Princeton in 1974.

While at Princeton, he led a student movement demanding Princeton's divestment with the South African apartheid government. The organization was titled People’s Front for the Liberation of Southern Africa. He also led a sit-in with 210 student participants in the spring of 1978, leading to Princeton's divestment from several aforementioned corporations.

The same year, Hamm graduated cum laude.

=== Post-graduation ===
Hamm returned to Newark in 1980. In 1982, Hamm and 9 others founded the People's Organization for Progress, a Newark-based grassroots civil rights organization. As of 2024, they have held weekly protests against police brutality, marched to Trenton to advocate for police reforms, and rallied outside the New Jersey State House for various civil rights concerns.

In 1988 he was New Jersey's co-chair for Jesse Jackson's presidential campaign.

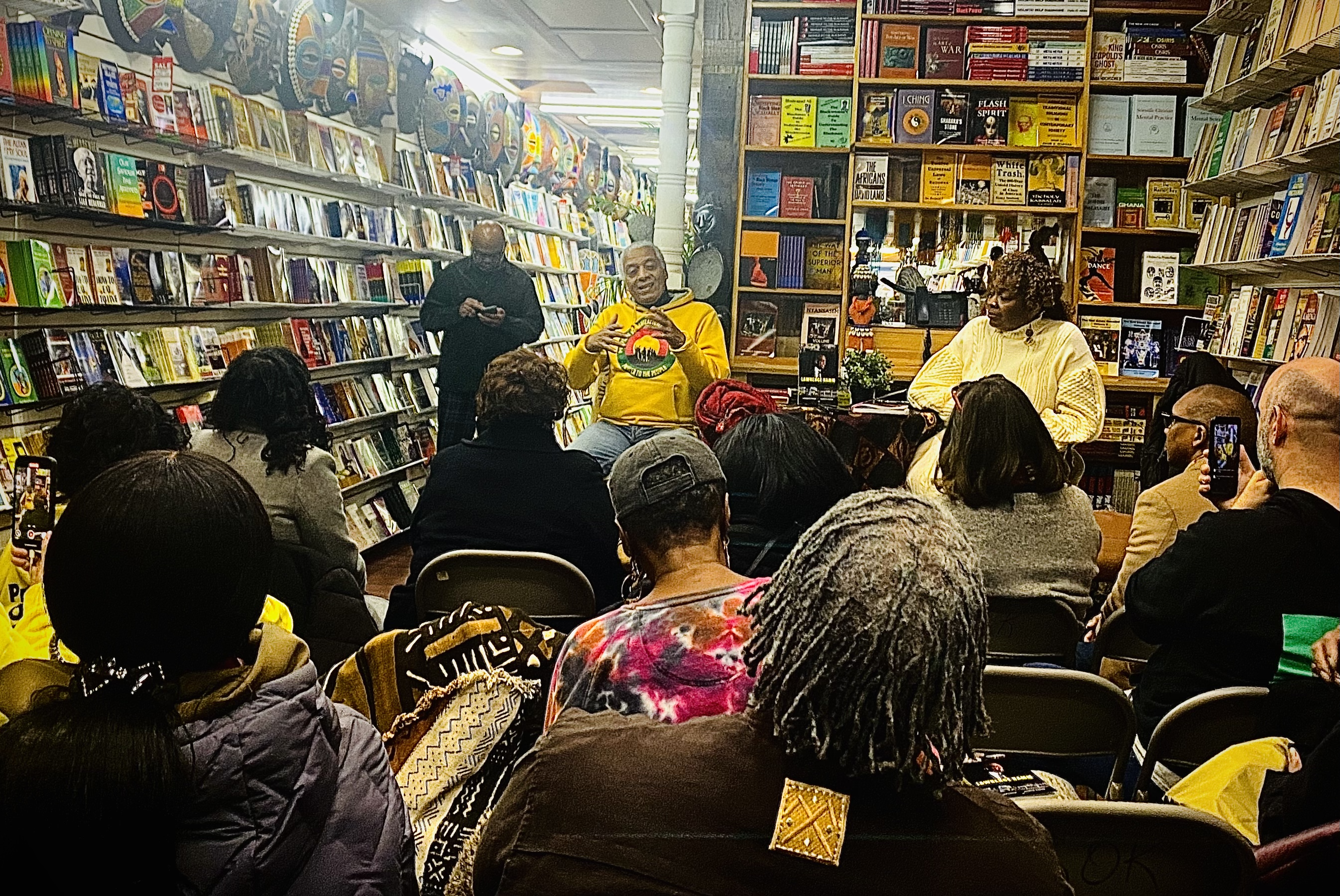
Hamm and co-author Annette Alson at his biography's book signing event in Newark, 2025

=== 21st century ===
In 2020, Hamm ran in the Senate election as a Democrat, winning 12% of the vote in the primary against incumbent Senator Cory Booker. Hamm received 118,802 votes. The same year, along with People's Organization for Progress, he organized and led a 12,000-person Newark George Floyd protest against police brutality, which was also fronted by Newark mayor Ras Baraka and featured speakers and dance activism. The New York Times stressed the peaceful aspect of the protest and its successful de-escalation, citing community members' memories of widespread violence during the 1967 Newark riots.

On February 10, 2023, the City of Newark hosted Hamm alongside Judge Victoria Pratt, Bashir Akinyele, and David Allen during their annual Black History Month Flag Raising. The flag raising event involved raising the Pan-African flag and was intended to honor the invited activists for their continued contributions to the Newark community.

Hamm has been vocal about his opposition of Trumpism and its desire to establish minority rule.

In 2024, he expressed his support for a ceasefire during the Gaza war, along with an end to U.S. military aid to Israel. Democracy Now! conducted an interview with Hamm, discussing his involvement in college anti-apartheid protests during the 1970s and how these correlate with college students' Gaza war protests. He stated to the New Jersey Monitor,

"Dr. King said our country, the United States of America, is ‘the greatest purveyor of violence in the world.’ That was true in 1968, and it is true today. Genocide is being carried out before our very eyes. And if the United States government does not use the leverage that it has, we are going to be drawn into another forever war."

The same year, he ran in the 2024 United States Senate election in New Jersey as a Democrat, where he received 47,796 votes (9%).

As chairman of the POP, Hamm organized the Martin Luther King March Of Resistance in Newark on January 18, 2025. The rally and march took place at the Essex County Courthouse's 2021 Martin Luther King Statue, located on MLK Boulevard in Newark, New Jersey. It had at least 500 participants, with a total of 289 organizations endorsing the event. Endorsing organziations included the NAACP, Showing Up for Racial Justice, Latino Action Network, Bethany Baptist Church, Make The Road New Jersey, International Black Women’s Congress, Seton Hall University, American Friends Service Committee Prison Watch, Occupy Bergen County, National Black Political Convention, Black Lives Matter, New Jersey Working Families Party, Our Revolution, International Action Center, Newark activist Tamika Darden-Thomas's Gregory Thomas Foundation, and the A. Philip Randolph Institute.

On February 17, 2025, Hamm was among the organizers of a bus trip from Newark to Washington, D.C. to protest policies and budget cuts proposed by the Trump administration, such as attacks on diversity, equity, and inclusion and affirmative action. The trip occurred in collaboration between POP, the Newark NAACP, and Rally Forward president Gloria J. Browne-Marshall.

== Personal life ==
As of 2024, Hamm's family lives in Montclair, New Jersey. He is a father of three daughters and enjoys jogging and running.

He has named his parents (as well as Amiri Baraka, Kenneth A. Gibson, Malcolm X, and Dr. Martin Luther King Jr.) as his greatest influences.

== See also ==
- History of Newark, New Jersey
