= George Wallace (American comedian) =

American comedian and actor (born 1952)

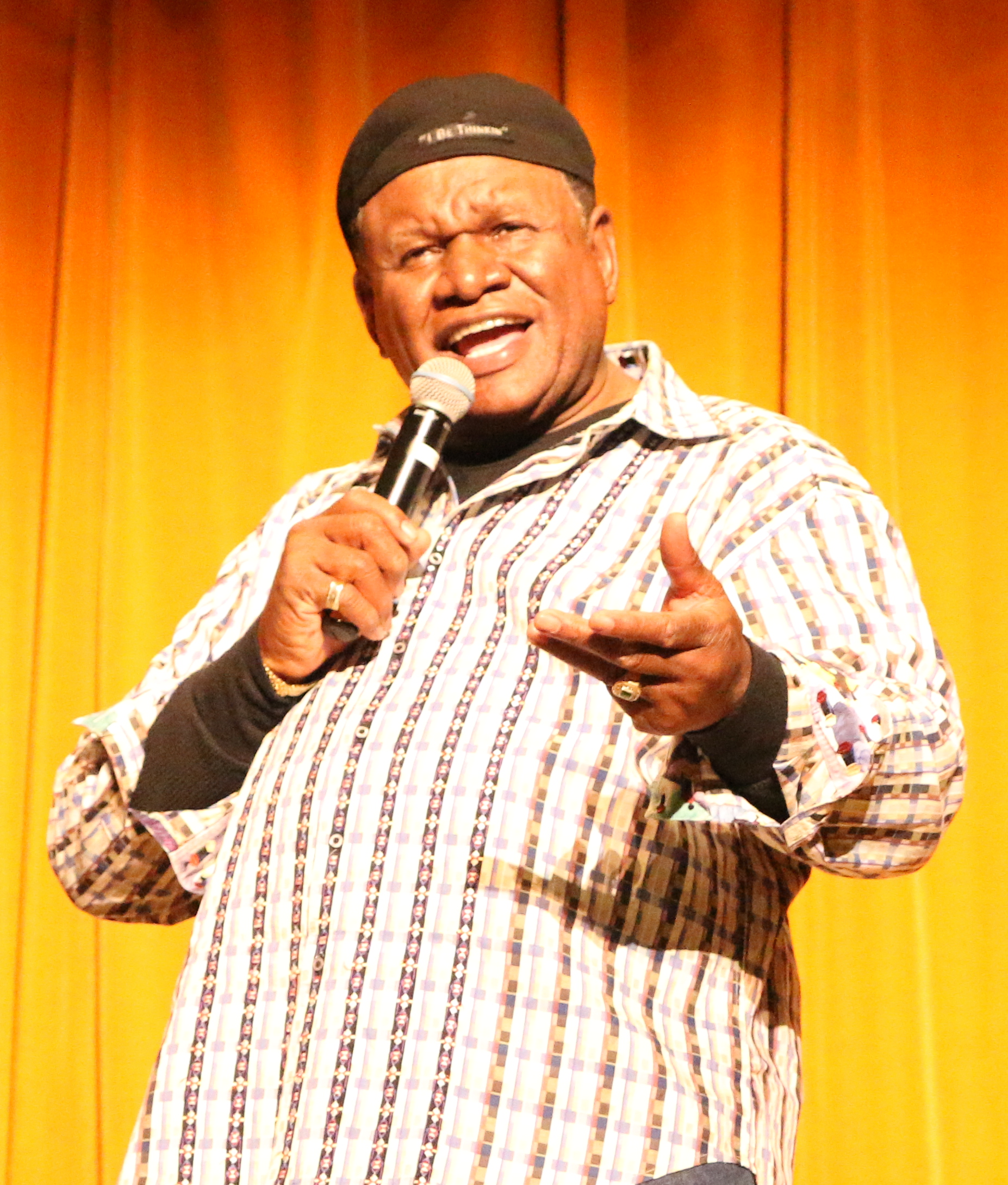
- Wallace in 2014
- Born: George Henry Wallace; July 21, 1952 (age 74); Atlanta, Georgia, U.S.
- Parent(s): George Wallace Sr. (father); Mary Lou Wallace (mother)
- Relatives: Steve Wallace (nephew)

Comedy career
- Years active: 1977–present
- Medium: Television, stand-up, film
- Website: georgewallace.net

George Henry Wallace (born July 21, 1952) is an American comedian and actor. Wallace has had supporting roles in a number of films, including 3 Strikes (2000) and the Coen brothers film The Ladykillers (2004) as Sheriff Wyner. Wallace also appeared in Batman Forever (1995) as the Mayor of Gotham City. Other film credits include A Rage in Harlem (1991), The Wash (2001), Punchline (1988), Things Are Tough All Over (1982), and Mr. Deeds (2002).

Wallace made a brief appearance in the sitcom Scrubs in the episode "My Words of Wisdom" (2007), and in the sitcom Seinfeld in the episode "The Checks", in which he played the doctor that was distracted by the song "Witchy Woman". He also appeared in the introduction scene to the home video release of Jerry Seinfeld: I'm Telling You for the Last Time - Live on Broadway (1999) as a fictionalized version of himself. He portrayed a man in a retirement home in The Last Laugh (2019) and starred as Mayor Benson in Hubie Halloween (2020).

== Early life and education ==
Wallace was born in Atlanta, Georgia to Mary Lou and George Wallace Sr. Wallace was educated at Lynwood Park Elementary School and Lynwood Park High School. His mother died when he was sixteen, prompting him to move to Ohio, where he found a job with Firestone Tire. As part of the company's tuition reimbursement program, Wallace enrolled in the University of Akron, in Akron, Ohio. He studied transportation, marketing and advertising.

== Career ==
Upon graduating college, Wallace moved to New York City to pursue his childhood dream of being a comedian. Initially, success in comedy proved elusive and Wallace worked as a salesman for an advertising agency to pay the bills.

Wallace's break came when one of his clients opened a comedy club. The club owner was amused by Wallace's natural humor and friendly demeanor and offered him the chance to perform stand-up comedy. In 1977, Wallace walked on stage for the first time, wearing a preacher's robe and calling himself The Right Reverend Dr. George Wallace. His routine was completely improvised. He stayed in New York City for several years, perfecting his craft and living with friend and fellow comedian Jerry Seinfeld.

In 1978, Wallace moved to the West Coast, where he quickly became recognized as a talented young comedian. After one of his performances, producers from The Redd Foxx Show asked him to write for the popular series. However, after only one year of writing, Wallace returned to the stage. He became a regular at The Comedy Store in West Hollywood, California, which also featured artists including Richard Pryor, Rodney Dangerfield, Roseanne Barr, Jay Leno and Robin Williams. Wallace also took his comedy show on the road, opening for George Benson, Diana Ross, Donna Summer and Smokey Robinson, among others.

Wallace was named the Best Male Standup Comedian during the 1995 American Comedy Awards. He has explained that his routines are inspired by everyday moments of life. His social commentary proved popular with radio audiences as well. Wallace was a regular on the Tom Joyner Morning Show before joining Isaac Hayes on a popular radio program on the former WRKS radio station in New York City. He also starred in his own HBO special and has appeared on many television shows, including The Tonight Show, The Oprah Winfrey Show and Late Night with David Letterman.

In December 2007, Wallace suffered an onstage injury when he fell during a private-party performance at the Bellagio resort hotel and casino in Las Vegas. He sued the Bellagio, claiming negligence after tripping over loose wires on stage. In April 2014, a Las Vegas jury found in favor of Wallace and awarded him $1.3 million.

After winning his case against the Bellagio, Wallace announced that he would end his 10-year run as a Las Vegas headliner to pursue other projects. "There are so many things to do. It's time to get into something new."

In 2025, he made an appearance on Celebrity Family Feud.

== Personal life ==
Wallace has had political ambitions. In 2006, he considered running for mayor of the city of Las Vegas, Nevada. Wallace stated that as mayor, he would update the Las Vegas Strip, with an easy-to-use monorail, close the strip to vehicles, and expand the road system behind the Strip hotels.

He was the best man at comedian Jerry Seinfeld's wedding.

Wallace's nephew, Steve Wallace, played professional football with the San Francisco 49ers and Kansas City Chiefs.

== Filmography ==
=== Film ===
Year	Title	Role	Notes
1982	Things Are Tough All Over	The Champ	
1988	Punchline	Man with Arm in Cast	
1989	Bert Rigby, You're a Fool	Bartender	
1991	A Rage in Harlem	Grave Digger	
1992	Bebe's Kids	Card Player #4 (voice)	
1994	Cosmic Slop	Piggy	
1995	Batman Forever	The Mayor	
1997	Meet Wally Sparks	Bartender	
1999	Catfish in Black Bean Sauce	James	
2000	3 Strikes	Mr. Douglas	
2000	Little Nicky	Mayor Randolph	
2001	The Wash	Mr. Washington	
2002	Mr. Deeds	NAACP Administrator	
2004	The Ladykillers	Sheriff Wyner	
2009	Funny People	Himself	
2014	Shirin in Love	Officer Henderson	
2014	Think Like a Man Too	Randy the Dealer	
2016	Jerico	Greg Parsons	
2017	Grow House	Mark White	
2017	Just Getting Started	Larry	
2018	Nappily Ever After	Driver	
2019	The Last Laugh	Johnny Sunshine	
2020	Hubie Halloween	Mayor Benson	
2024	Unfrosted	Lloyd	
2025	Freakier Friday	Pickleball Announcer	

=== Television ===
Year	Title	Role	Notes
1987	The Dom DeLuise Show	George Henry Wallace	Episode #1.1
1991	The Sunday Comics	Himself	
1993	Tall Hopes	George Harris	Main cast
1994	In the Heat of the Night	Tommy Ammons	Episode: "Who Was Geli Bendl?"
1995	The Fresh Prince of Bel-Air	George	Episode: "The Script Formerly Known As..."
1996	Seinfeld	Doctor	Episode: "The Checks"
1996	C-Bear and Jamal	Hawthorne Wingo	Recurring cast
1996–2001	Arliss	Various Roles	Guest cast (season 1 & 4 & 6)
1997	Mother Goose: A Rappin' and Rhymin' Special	Farmer (voice)	TV movie
1997–99	Happily Ever After: Fairy Tales for Every Child	Farmer/Baba Mustafa	Guest cast (season 2–3)
1998	Jenny	Vet	Episode: "A Girl's Gotta Make Room for Daddy: Part 1"
1998	Moesha	Game Show Host	Episode: "A Terrible Thing Happened on My Tour of College"
2002	Santa Jr.	Norm Potter	TV movie
2002–03	The Parkers	Quincy DeJohn	Guest cast (season 3–4)
2003	Wanda at Large	Jimmy	Episode: "Back to the Club"
2004	Like Family	Bill, Tayna's Father	Episode: "Daddy Knows Best"
2007	Scrubs	Minister	Episode: "My Words of Wisdom"
2007	Tyler Perry's House of Payne	Jimmy	Episode: "Crazy In Love"
2007	Larry the Cable Guy's Christmas Spectacular	Wiseman	TV movie
2011	The Hot 10	Himself	Episode #1.35
2011	The Life & Times of Tim	Dante (voice)	Episode: "The Model from Newark/Tim's Hair Looks Amazing"
2012	Sullivan & Son	Leroy Williams	Episode: "Who's Your Daddy"
2015	The Soul Man	Clyde	Episode: "Who Let the Dog In?"
2015	Drunk History	Bill Russell	Episode: "Cleveland"
2015	Gigi Does It	Melvin Schlanger	Episode: "Eat Something"
2015–18	K.C. Undercover	Poppa Earl Cooper	Guest cast (season 1 & 3)
2016	Horace and Pete	George	Episode #1.10
2017	Coming to the Stage	Himself	Episode: "Ross Everett & Kiran Deol"
2017	Detroiters	Freddie "Motown" Brown	Episode: "Devereux Wigs"
2017	Mann & Wife	Poppa Bo	Episode: "Come On, Mann!"
2017–19	Funny You Should Ask	Himself/Panelist	Recurring panelist
2018	Law & Order: Special Victims Unit	Ron Carter	Episode: "Guardian"
2018–23	Bob's Burgers	Mr. Huggins (voice)	Guest cast (season 8-10 & 14)
2020	Mike Tyson Mysteries	Leonard (voice)	Episode: "The Stein Way"
2021	The Premise	Principal Wallace	Episode: "The Ballad of Jesse Wheeler"
2021–23	Ten Year Old Tom	Nelson's Dad (voice)	Recurring cast
2022	Atlanta	Greg	Episode: "Rich Wigga, Poor Wigga"
2023	History of the World, Part II	George Wallace	Episode: "V"
2024	Hacks	Himself	Episode: "Just for Laughs"
2025	Clean Slate	Harry Slate	Main role; also executive producer and creator

=== Podcasts ===
Year	Title	Role	Notes
1999	Adam Sandler's Audio Skits	Skipper Jenkins	Season 3, episode 6: "The Champion"
2026	Judge Travis	Greg Gregory	6 episodes

== Bibliography ==
- Wallace, George; Ewen, Dan (2013). Laff It Off!. Chaite Press. ASIN B00FY0NOO0.
