= Dax Dasilva =

Canadian businessman

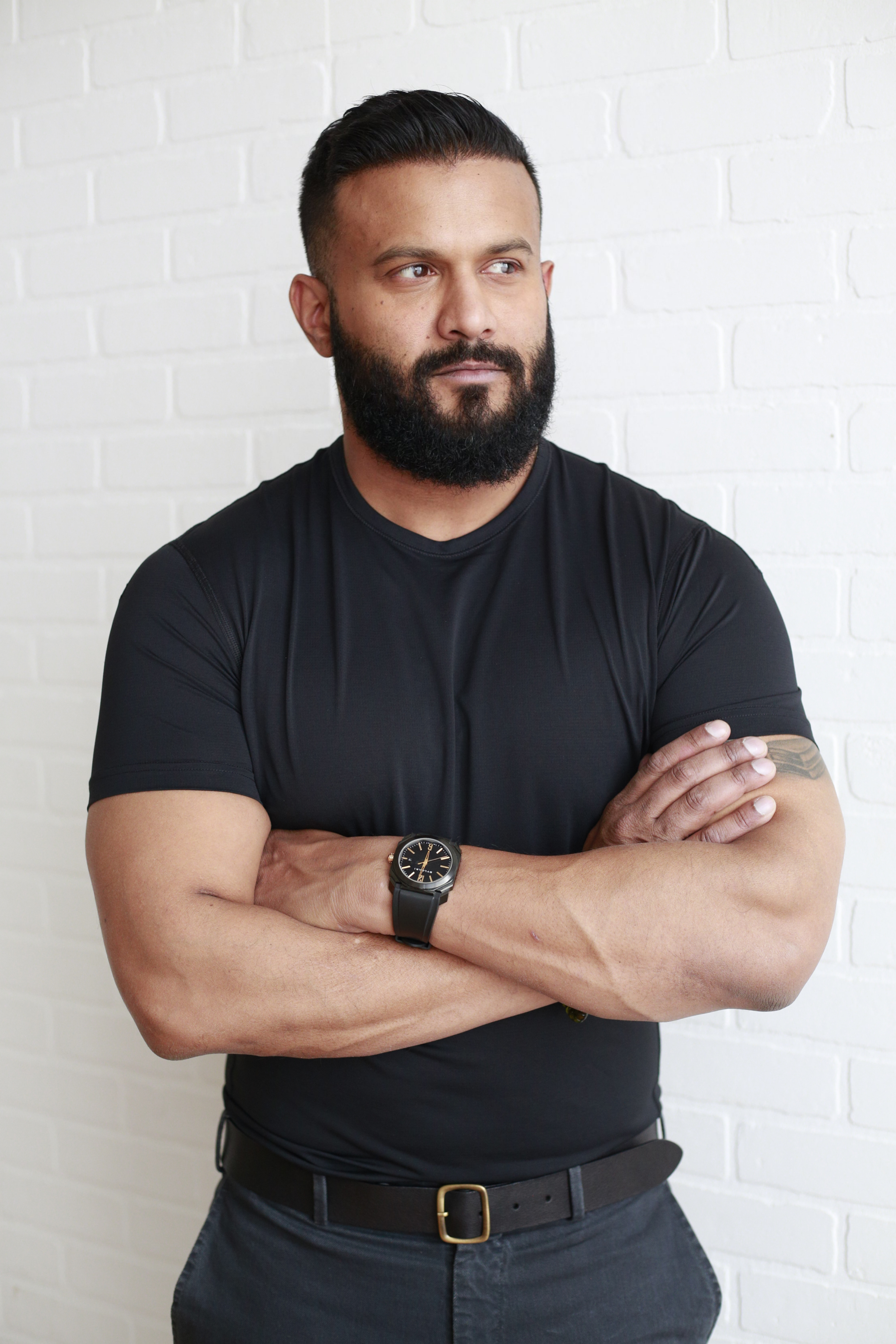
- Dasvila in 2022
- Born: Vancouver
- Education: University of British Columbia
- Occupations: Entrepreneur, author
- Title: Founder and CEO of Lightspeed

Dax Dasilva is a Canadian tech entrepreneur, author and philanthropist. Dasilva founded the e-commerce company Lightspeed in 2005, which went public in 2019 at a valuation of $1.7 billion. He was CEO of Lightspeed for 16 years, until stepping down in February 2022. Dasilva was reappointed CEO in 2024. Dasilva is the author of the 2019 book Age of Union about leadership, culture, spirituality, and nature. He is also the founder of two nonprofit organizations; the arts and culture organization Never Apart, and Age of Union Alliance, which funds conservation projects around the world. In 2025, he was awarded the King Charles III Coronation Medal after being nominated by the Nature Conservancy of Canada.

== Early life and education ==
Dasilva was born and raised in Vancouver, British Columbia to parents who had fled the regime of Idi Amin in Uganda as refugees in 1972. Dasilva became interested in computer programming at age twelve, and learned to build program interfaces on an Apple Macintosh given to him by his father. At age thirteen, Dasilva began apprenticing for a software developer.

He attended the University of British Columbia, where he studied computer science before changing to art history and religion.

== Career ==
In 2005, Dasilva founded Lightspeed, a Montreal-based e-commerce company. Dasilva conceived of Lightspeed to assist small independent businesses competing against larger companies.

In 2015, when the company had 500 employees, Dasilva moved its headquarters from a warehouse in Montreal’s Mile-Ex neighborhood, to Place Viger. Dasilva took Lightspeed public on the Toronto Stock Exchange in March 2019, described by the Financial Post as the “most successful initial public offering by a Canadian technology company in almost a decade”. He was one of few openly gay leaders of a major Canadian company. In February 2022, Dasilva moved to the role of executive chairman of the board from CEO in order to concentrate on environmental and equality projects for the company. He returned to the position of CEO at Lightspeed in February 2024.

Dasilva won an Emmy Award as an executive producer on the 2022 documentary Wildcat.

Dasilva was an executive producer of a 2025 documentary about Juma Xipaia, an Indigenous Brazilian environmental activist; titled Yanuni, the film was directed by Richard Ladkani, produced by Leonardo DiCaprio, and won best documentary at the Environmental Media Awards.

== Author ==
Dasilva authored a book titled Age of Union: Igniting the changemaker that was published in 2019. The book, which is partly a memoir, deals with change, leadership, culture, spirituality, and nature.

Dasilva’s second book, Echoes from Eden, was published in 2025, with a foreword by Jane Goodall, and recounts his experiences working with conservationists including Goodall, Juma Xipaia, and Kerry Bowman.

== Community involvement ==
In 1993, Dasilva participated in the Clayoquot “War in the Woods” protests in Vancouver to oppose old growth forest logging and clearcutting.

Following the movement of Lightspeed’s company headquarters in 2015, Dasilva converted the Mile-Ex warehouse that had previously been its headquarters into a nonprofit cultural and arts space called “Never Apart.” In 2021, Dasilva donated $40 million to found the non-profit “Age of Union”, an organization that focuses on global conservation and climate change efforts, with projects in Canada, Peru, Indonesia, and Congo. Dasilva’s Age of Union also funds efforts to protect international marine biodiversity.

In 2023, Dasilva partnered with Jane Goodall and indigenous Amazonian leaders to start a chapter of Goodall’s youth conservationist program Roots & Shoots in Brazil.

In 2025, Dasilva partnered with the conservation group Re:wild on a series of conservation efforts beginning with a $1 million reforestation and anti-poaching project in Madagascar.

Through Age of Union, Dasilva designed a traveling interactive exhibit called the Black Hole Experience, that uses light-absorbing paint, lighting, and a curved video display to simulate the visual and spatial effect of a black hole. Though not directly related to conservation, the exhibit was conceived by Dasilva to help visitors understand their connection to the natural world.

== Personal life ==
Dasilva came out as gay at age fourteen, and has credited the assistance he received at the time from LGBTQ support centers in Vancouver for helping to frame his philanthropic aims. He was an ambassador for Montreal Pride in 2015.

Dasilva converted to Judaism in the same timeframe as founding Lightspeed.
