= 37th Palm Springs International Film Festival =

2026 film festival

- Official poster
- Opening film: Calle Málaga
- Closing film: Glenrothan
- Location: Palm Springs, California, United States
- Hosted by: The Palm Springs International Film Society
- Artistic director: Lili Rodriguez
- No. of films: 168 films from 72 countries
- Festival date: Opening: 2 January 2026; Closing: 12 January 2026
- Website: www.psfilmfest.org

Palm Springs International Film Festival
- 2027 2025

The 37th Palm Springs International Film Festival took place from January 2 to 12, 2026, in Palm Springs, California, United States. The festival opened with Maryam Touzani's Spanish drama film Calle Malaga. This edition of the festival presented 168 films from 72 countries, including 53 premieres and 44 Oscar Submissions.

In the FIPRESCI jury awards announced on January 11, FIPRESCI Prize for Best International Feature Film was awarded to Sirāt by Oliver Laxe and Best International First Feature Film was awarded to Happy Birthday by Sarah Goher. The festival closed with Brian Cox's British drama film Glenrothan.

== Festival venues ==
The following are festival venues for screening films:

- Annenberg Theater
- The Plaza Theatre, South Palm Canyon Drive in Palm Springs, California
- ARCO Theatre (Palm Canyon Theatre)
- Festival Theaters
- Palm Springs Cultural Center (Camelot Theatre)
- Richards Center for the Arts at Palm Springs High School
- Mary Pickford is D'Place
- Cinemark Century La Quinta and XD

== Juries ==
The juries consists of the following members:

=== FIPRESCI International Film Jury ===
- Davide Abbatescianni, Italian film critic and journalist
- Pat Mullen, Canadian film critic and publisher
- Fran Romero, Chilean film critic and sociologist

=== Ibero-American Jury ===
- Javier Fuentes-León, Peruvian director
- Sabrina Avilés, founder and executive director of CineFest Latino Boston
- Mariana Mijares, Mexican journalist

=== Documentary Jury ===
- Will Sloan, Canadian film critic and writer
- Sky Sitney, cofounder and festival director of DC/DOX
- James Woolley, executive director of Miami Film Festival

=== New Voices New Visions ===
- Justin Decluoux, Canadian writer, podcaster and filmmaker
- Gabor Grainer, Head of Acquisitions at Films Boutique
- Abbey White, American journalist

== Official selection ==
This edition will showcase 168 films from 72 countries.

=== Opening and closing films ===
The opening and closing films of the festival are:

| English title | Original title | Director(s) | Production countrie(s) |
Opening film
| Calle Málaga | | Maryam Touzani | Morocco, France, Spain, Germany, Belgium |
Closing film
| Glenrothan | | Brian Cox | United Kingdom |

=== Awards Buzz – Best International Feature Films ===
The following section consists of submissions for Best International Feature Film at the 98th Academy Awards:

Highlighted title indicates the section winner.

| English title | Original title | Director(s) | Submission countrie(s) |
|---|---|---|---|
| 100 Litres of Gold | | Teemu Nikki | Finland |
| 2000 Meters to Andriivka | | Mstyslav Chernov | Ukraine |
| All That's Left of You | اللي باقي منك | Cherien Dabis | Jordan |
| Belén | | Dolores Fonzi | Argentina |
| Beloved Tropic | Querido trópico | Ana Endara | Panama |
| Eagles of the Republic | | Tarik Saleh | Sweden |
| Familia | | Francesco Costabile | Italy |
| Father | Otec | Tereza Nvotová | Slovakia |
| Franz | | Agnieszka Holland | Poland |
| Happy Birthday | هابي بيرث داي | Sarah Goher | Egypt |
| Hijra | هجری | Shahad Ameen | Saudi Arabia |
| Homebound | | Neeraj Ghaywan | India |
| It Was Just an Accident | یک تصادف ساده | Jafar Panahi | France |
| Kokuho | 国宝 | Lee Sang-il | Japan |
| The Last Dance | 破．地獄 | Anselm Chan Mou Yin | Hong Kong |
| Late Shift | Heldin | Petra Volpe | Switzerland |
| Left-Handed Girl | 左撇子女孩 | Shih-Ching Tsou | Taiwan |
| Little Trouble Girls | Kaj ti je deklica | Urška Djukić | Slovenia |
| The Love That Remains | Ástin Sem Eftir Er | Hlynur Pálmason | Iceland |
| Magellan | Magalhães | Lav Diaz | Philippines |
| Mr. Nobody Against Putin | | David Borenstein | Denmark |
| My Father's Shadow | | Akinola Davies Jr. | United Kingdom |
| The Mysterious Gaze of the Flamingo | La misteriosa mirada del flamenco | Diego Céspedes | Chile |
| No Other Choice | 어쩔수가없다 | Park Chan-wook | South Korea |
| Orphan | Árva | László Nemes | Hungary |
| Palestine 36 | | Annemarie Jacir | Palestine |
| A Poet | Un Poeta | Simón Mesa Soto | Colombia |
| The President's Cake | مملكة القصب | Hasan Hadi | Iraq |
| Reedland | Rietland | Sven Bresser | Netherlands |
| A Sad and Beautiful World | نجوم الأمل و الألم | Cyril Aris | Lebanon |
| The Sea | הים | Shai Carmeli-Pollak | Israel |
| The Secret Agent | O Agente Secreto | Kleber Mendonça Filho | Brazil |
| Sirāt | | Oliver Laxe | Spain |
| Sound of Falling | In die Sonne schauen | Mascha Schilinski | Germany |
| The Tale of Silyan | Силјан | Tamara Kotevska | North Macedonia |
| The Things You Kill | | Alireza Khatami | Canada |
| The Tower of Strength | Obraz | Nikola Vukčević | Montenegro |
| Traffic | Reostat | Teodora Ana Mihai | Romania |
| Under the Flags, the Sun | Bajo las banderas, el sol | Juanjo Pereira | Paraguay |
| A Useful Ghost | ผีใช้ได้ค่ะ | Ratchapoom Boonbunchachoke | Thailand |
| The Voice of Hind Rajab | صوت هند رجب | Kaouther Ben Hania | Tunisia |
| Young Mothers | Jeunes mères | Jean-Pierre and Luc Dardenne | Belgium |

=== After Dark ===
| English title | Original title | Director(s) | Production countrie(s) |
|---|---|---|---|
| The Book of Sijjin & Illiyyin | | Hadrah Daeng Ratu | Indonesia |
| Good Luck, Have Fun, Don't Die | | Gore Verbinski | United States, Germany, South Africa |
| Mārama | | Taratoa Stappard | New Zealand |
| The Plague | | Charlie Polinger | Romania, United States |

=== American Indies ===
The following films were selected to be screened as part of the American Indies section:

| English title | Original title | Director(s) | Production countrie(s) |
|---|---|---|---|
| Burt | | Joe Burke | United States |
| Fantasy Life | | Matthew Shear | United States |
| Honeyjoon | | Lilian T. Mehrel | United States, Portugal |
| Idiotka | | Nastasya Popov | United States |
| She Dances | | Rick Gomez | United States |
| Tow | | Stephanie Laing | United States |

=== Close-Ups ===
The following films were selected to be screened as part of the Close-Ups section:

| English title | Original title | Director(s) | Production countrie(s) |
|---|---|---|---|
| Boorman and the Devil | | David Kittredge | United States |
| Coroner to Stars | | Ben Hethcoat, Keita Ideno | United States |
| The Eyes of Ghana | | Ben Proudfoot | United States |
| Kim Novak's Vertigo | | Alexandre O. Philippe | United States |
| Third Act | | Tadashi Nakamura | United States |

=== Country Focus ===
The following films were selected to be screened as part of the Country Focus section:

| English title | Original title | Director(s) | Production countrie(s) |
|---|---|---|---|
| Amrum | | Fatih Akin | Germany |
| A Land Within | Zweitland | Michael Kofler | Germany, Italy, Austria |
| Islands | | Jan-Ole Gerster | Germany |
| Miroirs No. 3 | | Christian Petzold | Germany |
| Silent Friend | Stille Freundin | Ildikó Enyedi | Germany, France, Hungary |
| Stars (1959) | Sterne | Konrad Wolf | East Germany, Bulgaria |
| What Marielle Knows | Was Marielle weiß | Frédéric Hambalek | Germany |

=== Family Day ===
The following films were selected to be screened as part of the Family Day section:

| English title | Original title | Director(s) | Production countrie(s) |
|---|---|---|---|
| Arco | | Ugo Bienvenu | France |
| KPop Demon Hunters | | Maggie Kang, Chris Appelhans | United States |
| Zootopia 2 | | Jared Bush, Byron Howard | United States |

=== Gateway Cinema ===
The following films were selected to be screened as part of the Gateway Cinema section:

| English title | Original title | Director(s) | Production countrie(s) |
|---|---|---|---|
| Bringing Up Baby (1938) | | Howard Hawks | United States |
| Casablanca (1942) | | Michael Curtiz | United States |
| Fire (1996) | | Deepa Mehta | India |
| In the Mood for Love (2000) | 花樣年華 | Wong Kar-wai | Hong Kong, France |
| Medea (1988) | | Lars von Trier | Denmark |

=== Local Spotlight ===
The following films were selected to be screened as part of the Local Spotlight section:

| English title | Original title | Director(s) | Production countrie(s) |
|---|---|---|---|
| Ramona and the Ballad of Juan Diego | | Jason Sklaver | United States |

=== Modern Masters ===
The following films were selected to be screened as part of the Modern Masters section:

| English title | Original title | Director(s) | Production countrie(s) |
|---|---|---|---|
| Below the Clouds | Sotto le nuvole | Gianfranco Rosi | Italy |
| The Captive | El cautivo | Alejandro Amenábar | Spain, Italy |
| Cover-Up | | Laura Poitras and Mark Obenhaus | United States |
| Dreams | | Michel Franco | Mexico, United States |
| Hen | Kota | György Pálfi | Germany, Greece, Hungary |
| The Last Viking | Den Sidste Viking | Anders Thomas Jensen | Denmark, Sweden |
| A Magnificent Life | Marcel et Monsieur Pagnol | Sylvain Chomet | France, Canada, Belgium, Luxembourg, United States |
| Orwell: 2+2=5 | | Raoul Peck | France, United States |
| The Soundman | | Frank Van Passel | Belgium,Netherlands, Denmark |
| Two Prosecutors | Два прокурора | Sergei Loznitsa | Latvia, France, Germany, Netherlands, Romania, Lithuania |
| Yes | כן! | Nadav Lapid | Israel, France, Germany, Cyprus, United Kingdom |

=== New Voices New Visions ===
The following films were selected to be screened as part of the New Voices New Visions competition:

| English title | Original title | Director(s) | Production countrie(s) |
|---|---|---|---|
| Broken Voices | Sbormistr | Ondřej Provazník | Czech Republic, Slovakia |
| Deaf | Sorda | Eva Libertad | Spain |
| God Will Not Help | Bog Neće Pomoći | Hana Jušić | Croatia, Italy, Romania, Greece, France, Slovenia |
| Lucky Lu | | Lloyd Lee Choi | United States, Canada |
| Mad Bills to Pay (or Destiny, dile que no soy malo) | | Joel Alfonso Vargas | United States |
| The Nature of Invisible Things | A natureza das coisas invisíveis | Rafaela Camelo | Brazil, Chile |
| The Negotiator | | Alessandro Tonda | Italy |
| On the Sea | | Helen Walsh | United Kingdom |
| Silent Rebellion | À bras-le-corps | Marie-Elsa Sgualdo | Switzerland, Belgium, France |

=== Queer Cinema Today & The Gayla ===
The following films were selected to be screened as part of the Queer Cinema Today section and The Gayla:

| English title | Original title | Director(s) | Production countrie(s) |
|---|---|---|---|
| 3670 | | Park Joon-ho | South Korea |
| Dope Queens | | Grafton Doyle | United States |
| Drunken Noodles | | Lucio Castro | United States, Argentina |
| Jimpa | | Sophie Hyde | Australia, Netherlands, Finland |
| The Little Sister | La Petite Dernière | Hafsia Herzi | France, Germany |
| Manok | 이반리 장만옥 | Lee Yu-jin | South Korea |
| Maspalomas | | Jose Mari Goenaga, Aitor Arregi | Spain |
| State of Firsts | | Chase Joynt | United States |
| We Are Pat | | Ro Haber | United States |

=== Special Presentations ===
The following films were selected to be screened as part of the Special Presentations section:

| English title | Original title | Director(s) | Production countrie(s) |
|---|---|---|---|
| Dead Man's Wire | | Gus Van Sant | United States |
| Hamlet | | Aneil Karia | United States, United Kingdom |
| The Housemaid | | Paul Feig | United States |
| I Swear | | Kirk Jones | Scotland |
| Vertigo (1958) | | Alfred Hitchcock | United States |

=== Talking Pictures ===
The following films were selected to be screened as part of the Talking Pictures section:

| English title | Original title | Director(s) | Production countrie(s) |
|---|---|---|---|
| Blue Moon | | Richard Linklater | United States, Ireland |
| Frankenstein (Note: Screenplay by Guillermo del Toro; based on the 1818 novel Frankenstein by Mary Shelley.) | | Guillermo del Toro | United States |
| Hamnet | | Chloé Zhao | United Kingdom, United States |
| King Hamlet | | Elvira Lind | United States, Denmark |
| The Librarians | | Kim A. Snyder | United States |
| Nuremberg | | James Vanderbilt | United States |
| One Battle After Another | | Paul Thomas Anderson | United States |
| Sentimental Value | Affeksjonsverdi | Joachim Trier | Norway, France, Germany, Denmark, Sweden, United Kingdom |
| The Testament of Ann Lee | | Mona Fastvold | United Kingdom, United States |
| Train Dreams (Note: Screenplay by Greg Kwedar; based on the 2011 novella Train Dreams by Denis Johnson.) | | Clint Bentley | United States |
| Wicked: For Good | | Jon M. Chu | United States |

=== True Stories ===
The following films were selected to be screened as part of the True Stories section:

| English title | Original title | Director(s) | Production countrie(s) |
|---|---|---|---|
| Adaptation to Darkness | הסתגלות לאפלה | Shay Fogelman | Israel |
| ASCO: Without Permission | | Travis Gutiérrez Senger | United States, United Kingdom |
| Ask E. Jean | | Ivy Meeropol | United States |
| The Gas Station Attendant | | Karla Murthy | United States |
| Modern Whore | | Nicole Bazuin | Canada |
| Natchez | | Suzannah Herbert | United States |
| Speak | | Jennifer Tiexiera, Guy Mossman | United States |
| Steal This Story, Please! | | Tia Lessin and Carl Deal | United States |
| Whistle | | Christopher Nelius | Australia |
| Yanuni | | Richard Ladkani | Austria, Brazil, USA, Canada, Germany |

=== World Cinema Now ===
The following films were selected to be screened as part of the World Cinema Now section:

| English title | Original title | Director(s) | Production countrie(s) |
|---|---|---|---|
| Altar Boys | Ministranci | Piotr Domalewski | Poland |
| The Battle of Oslo | Blücher | Daniel Fahre | Norway |
| Beginnings | Begyndelser | Jeanette Nordahl | Denmark |
| The Blue Trail | O Último Azul | Gabriel Mascaro | Brazil, Mexico, Chile, Netherlands |
| Colours of Time | La Venue de l'avenir | Cédric Klapisch | France, Belgium |
| The Condor Daughter | La Hija Cóndor | Álvaro Olmos Torrico | Bolivia, Peru, Uruguay |
| Damned If You Do, Damned If You Don't | Come ti muovi, sbagli | Gianni Di Gregorio | Italy, France |
| Frontier | Frontera | Judith Colell | Spain, Belgium |
| Fuze | | David Mackenzie | United Kingdom |
| Gustaakh Ishq | Gustaakh Ishq: Kuch Pehle Jaisa | Vibhu Puri | India |
| H Is for Hawk | | Philippa Lowthorpe | United Kingdom, United States |
| Hallo Betty | Hallo Betty | Pierre Monnard | Switzerland |
| It Would Be Night in Caracas | La Hija de la Española | Mariana Rondón, Marité Ugás | Mexico |
| Ky Nam Inn | Quán Kỳ Nam | Leon Le | Vietnam |
| Lovely Day | Mille secrets mille dangers | Philippe Falardeau | Canada |
| Made in EU | | Stephan Komandarev | Bulgaria, Germany, Czech Republic |
| Meadowlarks | | Tasha Hubbard | Canada |
| Mr Burton | | Marc Evans | United Kingdom |
| No Comment | Ingen Kommentar | Petter Næss | Norway |
| Once Upon My Mother | Ma mère, Dieu et Sylvie Vartan | Ken Scott | Canada, France |
| The Party's Over! | Classe moyenne | Antony Cordier | France |
| Primavera | | Damiano Michieletto | Italy, France |
| A Private Life | Vie privée | Rebecca Zlotowski | France |
| Project Y | 프로젝트 Y | Lee Hwan | South Korea |
| Promised Sky | Promis le ciel | Erige Sehiri | Tunisia, France, Netherlands, Qatar |
| Renoir | ルノワール | Chie Hayakawa | Japan, France, Singapore, Philippines, Indonesia, Qatar |
| The Richest Woman in the World | La Femme la plus riche du monde | Thierry Klifa | France |
| Saipan | | Lisa Barros D'Sa, Glenn Leyburn | Ireland, United Kingdom |
| Spit | | Jonathan Teplitzky | Australia |
| Sundays | Los domingos | Alauda Ruiz de Azúa | Spain, France |
| The Sun Rises on Us All | 日掛中天 | Cai Shangjun | China |
| To the Victory! | За Перемогу! | Valentyn Vasyanovych | Ukraine, Lithuania |
| Two Pianos | Deux Pianos | Arnaud Desplechin | France |
| Youngblood | | Hubert Davis | Canada |

== Awards ==
On January 11, 2026 juried award winners were announced:

=== International Film competition ===
- Best International Feature Film: Sirāt by Oliver Laxe
- Best International First Feature Film: Happy Birthday by Sarah Goher
- Best Actor in an International Feature Film: Milan Ondrík for Father
- Best Actress in an International Feature Film: Nina Ye, Janel Tsai, Shi-yuan Ma for Left-Handed Girl
- Best International Screenplay: Joachim Trier and Eskil Vogt for Sentimental Value

=== Documentary competition ===
- Best Documentary: Natchez by Suzannah Herbert
- Special Mention: Yanuni by Richard Ladkani

=== New Voices New Visions ===
- New Voices New Visions Award: 3670 by Park Joon-ho
- New Voices New Visions Special Mention: Deaf by Eva Libertad

=== Ibero-American Competition ===
- Ibero-American Award: It Would Be Night in Caracas by Mariana Rondón, Marité Ugás
- Ibero-American Special Mention: Runa Simi by Augusto Zegarra

=== Other awards ===
- Desert Views Award: Beloved Tropic by Ana Endara
- Young Cineastes Award: Remaining Native by Paige Bethmann

=== Opening Gala Awards ===
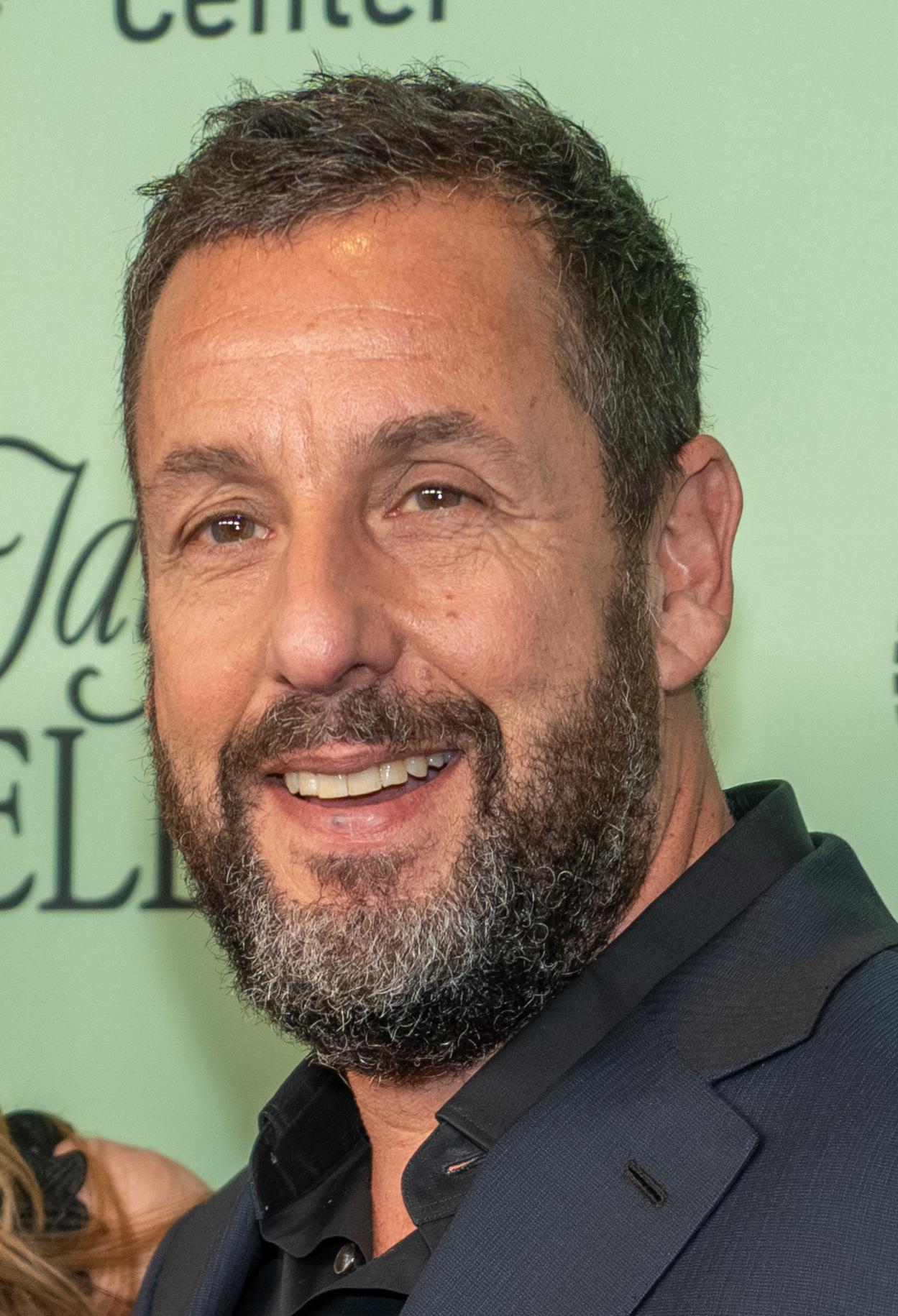
Adam Sandler, recipient of Chairman's Award

The following awards were presented to honor the performance of actors, directors and producers during 2025 at Opening Gala on January 3, 2026.

- Vanguard Award: Hamnet (Chloé Zhao, Jessie Buckley, and Paul Mescal)
- Icon Award Actor: Michael B. Jordan, American actor, producer and director, for Sinners
- Icon Award Actress: Kate Hudson, American actress and singer-songwriter, for Song Sung Blue
- Chairman's Award: Adam Sandler, actor, comedian and filmmaker, for Jay Kelly
- Desert Palm Achievement Award, Actor: Leonardo DiCaprio for One Battle After Another
- Desert Palm Achievement Award, Actress: Amanda Seyfried for The Testament of Ann Lee
- Career Achievement Award: Ethan Hawke, American actor, author and film director, for Blue Moon
- International Star Award: The ensemble of Sentimental Value (Renate Reinsve, Stellan Skarsgård, Inga Ibsdotter Lilleaas, and Elle Fanning)
- Visionary Award: Guillermo del Toro and cast (Oscar Isaac, Jacob Elordi, and Mia Goth) for Frankenstein
- Breakthrough Performance Award: Rose Byrne, Australian actress and executive producer, for If I Had Legs I'd Kick You
- Spotlight Award: Timothée Chalamet, actor and producer, for Marty Supreme
- Outstanding Artistic Achievement Award: Miley Cyrus, American singer, songwriter and actress, for "Dream as One" (from Avatar: Fire and Ash)

=== Creative Impact Awards ===
The following creative impact awards were presented by the Variety, an American trade magazine:

- Creative Impact in Acting Award: Dwayne Johnson, American actor and professional wrestler for The Smashing Machine
- Creative Impact in Breakthrough Performance Award: Teyana Taylor, American singer, songwriter, actress, model, dancer, choreographer, and music video director for One Battle After Another
- Creative Impact in Directing Award: Guillermo del Toro, Mexican filmmaker, author, and artist for Frankenstein

== Variety's 10 Directors to Watch ==
This year's list has American-made and international directors consisting of following:

- Akinola Davies Jr. for My Father's Shadow
- Beth de Araújo for Josephine
- Jan-Ole Gerster for Islands
- Sarah Goher for Happy Birthday
- Dave Green for Coyote vs. Acme
- Chandler Levack for Mile End Kicks
- Harry Lighton for Pillion
- NB Mager for Run Amok
- Kristen Stewart for The Chronology of Water
- Walter Thompson-Hernández for If I Go Will They Miss Me
