= Sea of Shadows =

2019 film

- Directed by: Richard Ladkani
- Produced by: Wolfgang Knöpfler; Walter Köhler
- Starring: Romel Eduardo Ledezma Abaroa; Rafael Pacchiano Alamán; Hector Capetillo; Andrea Crosta and others
- Cinematography: Richard Ladkani
- Edited by: Georg Michael Fischer; Verena Schönauer
- Music by: H. Scott Salinas
- Production companies: Terra Mater Factual Studios; Appian Way Productions; Malaika Pictures; The Wild Lens Collective
- Distributed by: National Geographic Documentary Films; Fox Searchlight Pictures (uncredited)
- Release dates: January 27, 2019 (Sundance); September 20, 2019 (Austria)
- Running time: 104 minutes
- Country: Austria
- Languages: English; Spanish
- Box office: $1,996

Sea of Shadows is a 2019 Austrian documentary about environmental activists (Sea Shepherd), the Mexican Navy, marine scientists and undercover investigators trying to prevent the extinction of the vaquita, a species of porpoise and the smallest whale in the world, by pulling gillnets, doing research, and fighting back Mexican cartels and Chinese mafia who are destroying ocean habitats in their brutal pursuit to harvest the swim bladder of the totoaba fish, known as the "cocaine of the sea". The 1 hour and 44 minutes long film is directed by Richard Ladkani.

== Production ==
Sea of Shadows was produced by Austrian company Terra Mater Factual Studios, in association with Leonardo DiCaprio, Appian Way, Malaika Pictures and Wild Lens Collective.

== Reception ==
Sea of Shadows premiered at the 2019 Sundance Film Festival on January 27, 2019. It was released in Austria on September 20, 2019. It won the Sundance award for World Cinema Documentary and was acquired by the National Geographic Channel for broadcast The film received the Cinema for Peace International Green Film Award in 2020. The Hollywood Reporter wrote, "Conveying just how fraught and delicate conservation efforts can be, logistically and emotionally, an extraordinary sequence unfolds as a pursuit on the water, placing the viewer smack in the midst of it."

== See also ==
- The Cove (film)
  - Behind The Cove, a documentary in response to the film
- Blackfish (film)
- The Whale (2011 film)
