= Kounta (software company) =

Australian software company

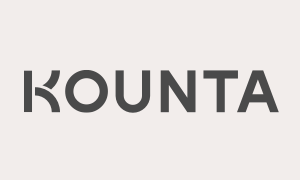
- Type: Subsidiary
- Industry: Software as a Service
- Founded: Sydney, Australia
- Founder: Nick Cloete
- Headquarters: Sydney, Australia
- Area served: Worldwide
- Services: Point of Sale
- Number of employees: 70+
- Parent: Lightspeed
- Website: www.kounta.com

Kounta is an Australian software company founded in 2012. The company's flagship product, Kounta, comprises a cloud based point of sale mobile app.

== History ==
Kounta was founded in 2012 by entrepreneur Nick Cloete. The company is headquartered in Sydney, Australia. In 2012, the company launched its flagship product, Kounta, a hospitality-focused point of sale (POS) mobile app for iPad, Android, Mac, and Windows. The app was initially a web-based application, and later developed into an online cash register and inventory management system that allows businesses to take payments from customers via mobile devices. The app has been made available for iPad, iPhone, and Android devices; as well as iOS, Windows, and other peripherals.

In 2012, Kounta partnered with Epson, providing a cloud-based POS platform for Epson printers. In 2013, the company formed a partnership with PayPal, integrating cashless and cardless transaction options via PayPal's mobile app. In 2014, MYOB (company) made an undisclosed investment towards Kounta. This partnership led to the development of MYOB Kounta, a co-branded application merging Kounta's POS with MYOB's application software. MYOB Kounta launched in October of the same year.

In 2016, Kounta announced a partnership with the Commonwealth Bank of Australia to include the Kounta app onto "Albert", the bank's EFTPOS tablet, which allowed the Commonwealth Bank of Australia to become the first bank to manage all customers operations from a single device and mobile application.

== Technology ==
The Kounta POS is a software-as-a-service (SaaS) that runs as an application in web browsers as well as natively on iOS and Android operating systems.

Kounta also incorporates an Open API, making it possible for other software providers to integrate complementary apps, further extending the software's use. Traditional IT tasks, such as data backup and encryption, hardware maintenance, and server upgrades are handled by Kounta's data center. Kounta is made accessible via paid monthly subscription licenses.

== Acquisition by Lightspeed ==
In October 2019, Kounta was acquired by Lightspeed, a commerce platform for retail, hospitality, and golf businesses based in Montreal, Canada. Lightspeed acquired Kounta for $35.3 million USD.
