= Never Apart (organization) =

General information
- Status: Non-profit organization and gallery space
- Location: Montréal, Canada
- Address: 7049 St. Urbain Street
- Opened: 2015

Website
- https://www.neverapart.com

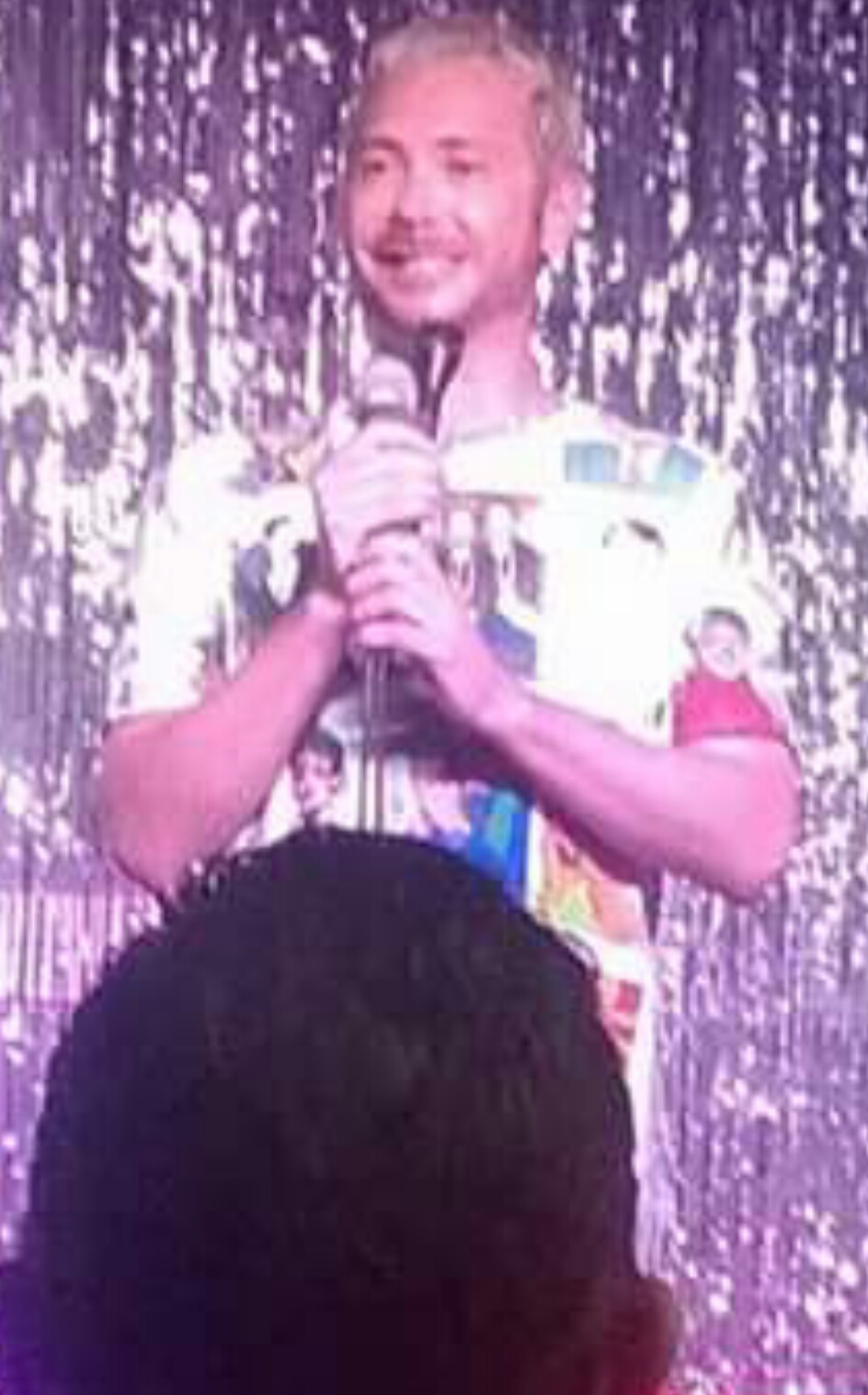
Michael Venus photographed in Montréal, Québec, Canada at Never Apart.

Never Apart is a non-profit organization and gallery based in Montréal, Canada that hosts art, culture, and music related events.

It was founded in 2015 by Dax Dasilva, who is also the founder of Lightspeed.

== Description ==
Operating out of a former home, Never Apart is a multi-purpose, 12,000 square feet (1,100 m^{2}) space with multiple gallery rooms, a movie theatre, sound system, 10,000+ vinyl collection, and pool. Events range from permanent art installations to shorter term exhibitions by both local and international artists of varying disciplines around societal issues and concerns such as Indigenous gender identity, surveillance, self-expression, and the effects of capitalism on women. Never Apart also hosts discussions, social gatherings, dance parties, workshops, talks, and film screenings.

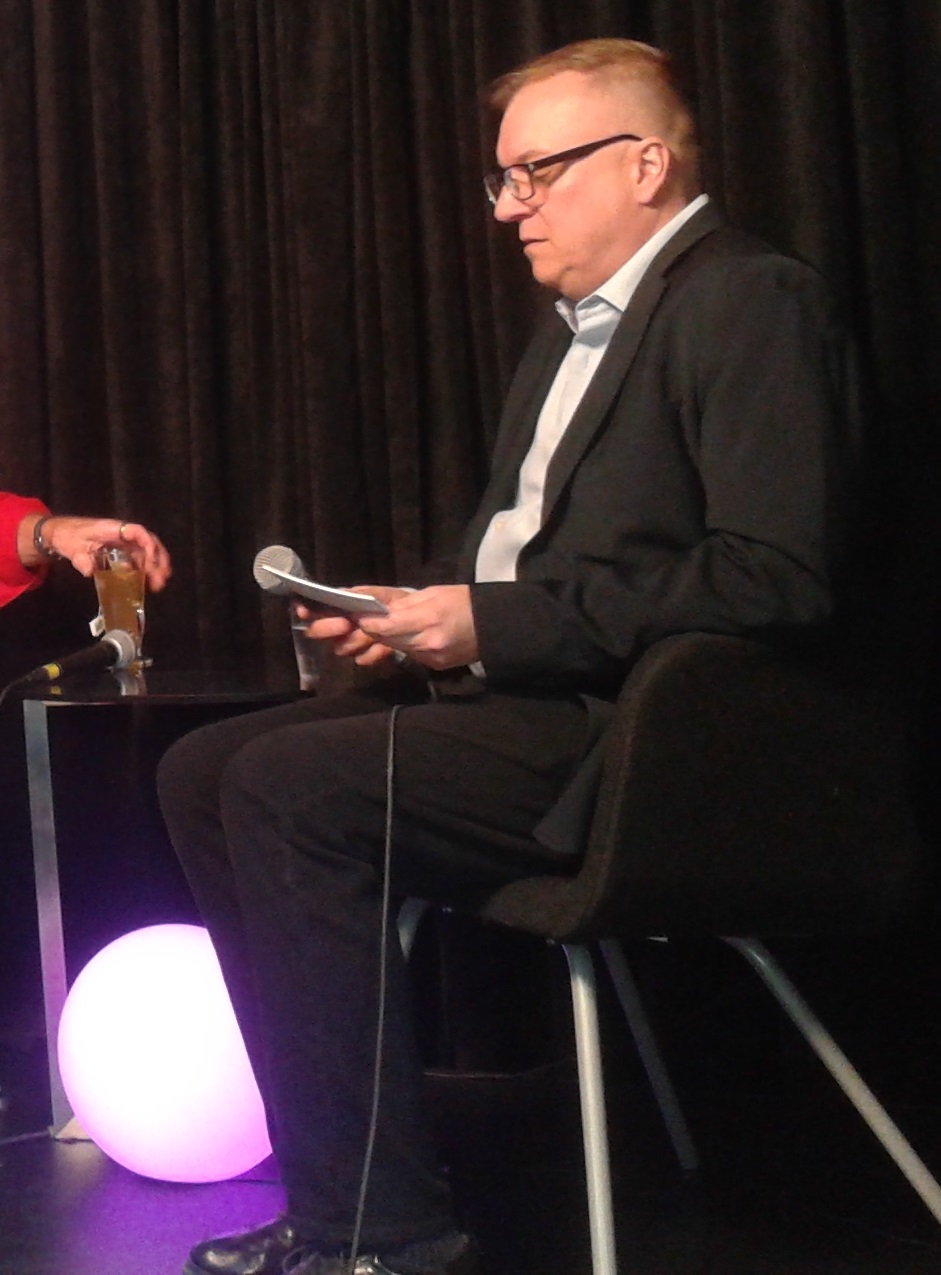
Matthew Hays photographed in Montréal, Québec, Canada at Never Apart.

== Projects ==
=== Web magazine ===
Self described as "change through spirit & culture," Magazine: Never Apart is an online, bilingual magazine produced by Never Apart. Through interviews, features, video recaps, and photo highlights it explores topical subjects around arts and culture and chronicles the work Never Apart does on a monthly basis.

=== NVA ===
NVA, the music division of Never Apart, aims to create community-based musical experiences throughout the city of Montréal. For the division's fifth anniversary it launched a zine featuring photography by SAAD and Bruno Destombes with all proceeds going to the Native Women's Shelter.

=== Notable exhibitions ===
==== Colour by Icons ====
Colour by Icons is an illustration project in the form of a collectible art book and permanent gallery exhibit that celebrates influential people who shaped the course of queer history, highlighting their struggles and achievements.

==== Wiggle ====
Never Apart annually hosts Wiggle, a wearable art and performance festival that began in the early 1990s where participants create wigs and headgear out of unlikely recycled items.

==== Two-Spirit Sur-Thrivance and the Art of Interrupting Narratives ====
Two-Spirit Sur-Thrivance and the Art of Interrupting Narratives was an art exhibition hosted by Never Apart between April 20th, 2017 and June 24th, 2017. As an act of reconciliation, it featured six Two-Spirit artists of varying artistic disciplines, lectures, and panel discussions to facilitate dialogue and consciousness.
