= Hallo Betty =

- Directed by: Pierre Monnard
- Written by: André Kütte
- Produced by: Peter Reichenbach; Roland Stebler
- Starring: Sarah Spale; Martin Vischer
- Cinematography: Tobias Dengle
- Edited by: Sophie Blöchlinger; Riccarda Schwarz
- Production company: C-Films
- Release date: November 4, 2025
- Country: Switzerland
- Language: Swiss German

Hallo Betty is a biographical film starring Sarah Spale. It is based on a true story about an advertising copywriter, Emmi Creola, who creates a fictional character in 1956, called Betty Bossi, who gives cooking advice to Swiss homemakers and changes the pattern of cooking in Switzerland. Many people believe that Betty Bossi is a real person and she rapidly becomes a household name. However, the intensity of her success and dealing with her husband, three children and household, create tensions. As is often the case today, the film portrays how Creola has to fight in a male-dominated world.

Producer Peter Reichenbach of C-Films said, “Everyone in Switzerland knows Betty Bossi. This film finally tells the story of the brilliant woman behind the name. It’s a story with humor, heart, and universal resonance.” “ ‘Hello Betty’ is a rare mix of strong emotional storytelling and commercial accessibility,” added Andreas Rothbauer, managing director of Picture Tree Intl. “It has all the ingredients to travel widely — a charismatic female lead, a fascinating real-life story, and broad audience appeal.”

The film premiered on November 4, 2025, and has appeared in many international film festivals.

== Cast ==
- Sarah Spale as Emmi
- Martin Vischer as Ernst
- Rabea Egg
- Viviana Zappa
- Cyril Metzger
- Ueli Jäggi
- Morgane Ferru
- Magdalena Neuhaus
- Esther Gemsch
- Thomas Douglas
- Leonardo Nigro
- Pablo Caprez
- Dominique Müller

== Production ==
Hello Betty was produced by C-Films in co-production with SRF Swiss Radio and Television, SRG SSR and CH Media TV AG, with support from the Federal Office of Culture, Zurich Filmfund, Cinéforom, Loterie Romande, Stage Pool Focal/Ernst Göhner Foundation and Suissimage, in collaboration with Ascot Elite Entertainment.

== Reviews ==
“A sparkling comedy which oozes optimism from every pore and which whisks us back to the 1950s by way of meticulous attention to detail which doesn’t fail to impress.”

According to Four time Film School Dropout, the film "embraces the freedom of storytelling while remaining rooted in truth...Monnard transforms a corporate origin story into an intimate portrait of ambition, creativity, and personal sacrifice.”

From the German film festival, "Monnard balances comedy and quiet drama with a sure hand and Spale anchors the film with a performance of real depth and charm. In an era when the kitchen was considered unattractively a woman's domain, Emmi Creola found a way to turn it into a cultural phenom

From the Dublin film festival, "One of the most prominent aspects of Hello Betty is the way it approaches its feminist themes. While Emmi’s journey is filled with constant ridicule from the men at work – and even in her home life – the film also acknowledges her own privilege. Scattered throughout the narrative are glimpses into the struggles of migrant workers, as well as the domestic violence faced by Maxi. The conflict between Emmi and her husband, Ernst, is particularly compelling, underlining how patriarchal structures and expectations can shape even the most wholesome relationships built on trust and love."

"One of the film’s highlights lies in its thoughtful production design, which meticulously recreates the texture and ambiance of the 1950s. Whether we find ourselves in the brightly lit studio set by the end of the film, in the neatly ordered office spaces, or inside the Emmi’s family home, every environment feels carefully constructed to reflect the period with authenticity, colour and detail. The narrative is visually enriched through it as well, as Emmi’s professional life begins to flourish, the interiors of the Creola home subtly unravel. Rooms grow more cluttered and less orderly, mirroring her internal strain and the widening gap between ambition and domestic responsibility."

== Awards ==
- Stony Brook Film Festival 2026 – Winner, Special Recognition Closing Night Film for director Pierre Monnard
- Swiss Film Awards 2026 – Nominee for Best Actress (Sarah Spale) and Nominee for Best Actor (Martin Vischer)
- Genuss Film Award 2026 (Zug) – Winner for Sarah Spale’s portrayal of Emmi Creola in Hallo Betty
- OFFICIAL SELECTION Palm Springs Film Festival 2026
- OFFICIAL SELECTION Geneva International Film Festival 2025

== Film festivals ==
- Palm Springs Film Festival 2026
- Dublin Film Festival 2026
- Geneva International Film Festival 2025
- Victoria Film Festival 2026
- Sunshine Coast Film Festival 2026
- Festival International du Film de Fribourg (FIFF) 2026
- Sonoma International Film Festival 2026
- HSBC German Film Festival 2026 (Australia)
- KinoFest / Goethe-Institut Events 2026
- Cleveland International Film Festival 2026
- Haifa Film Festival 2026
