= Djuena Tikuna =

Ticuna singer (born 1984

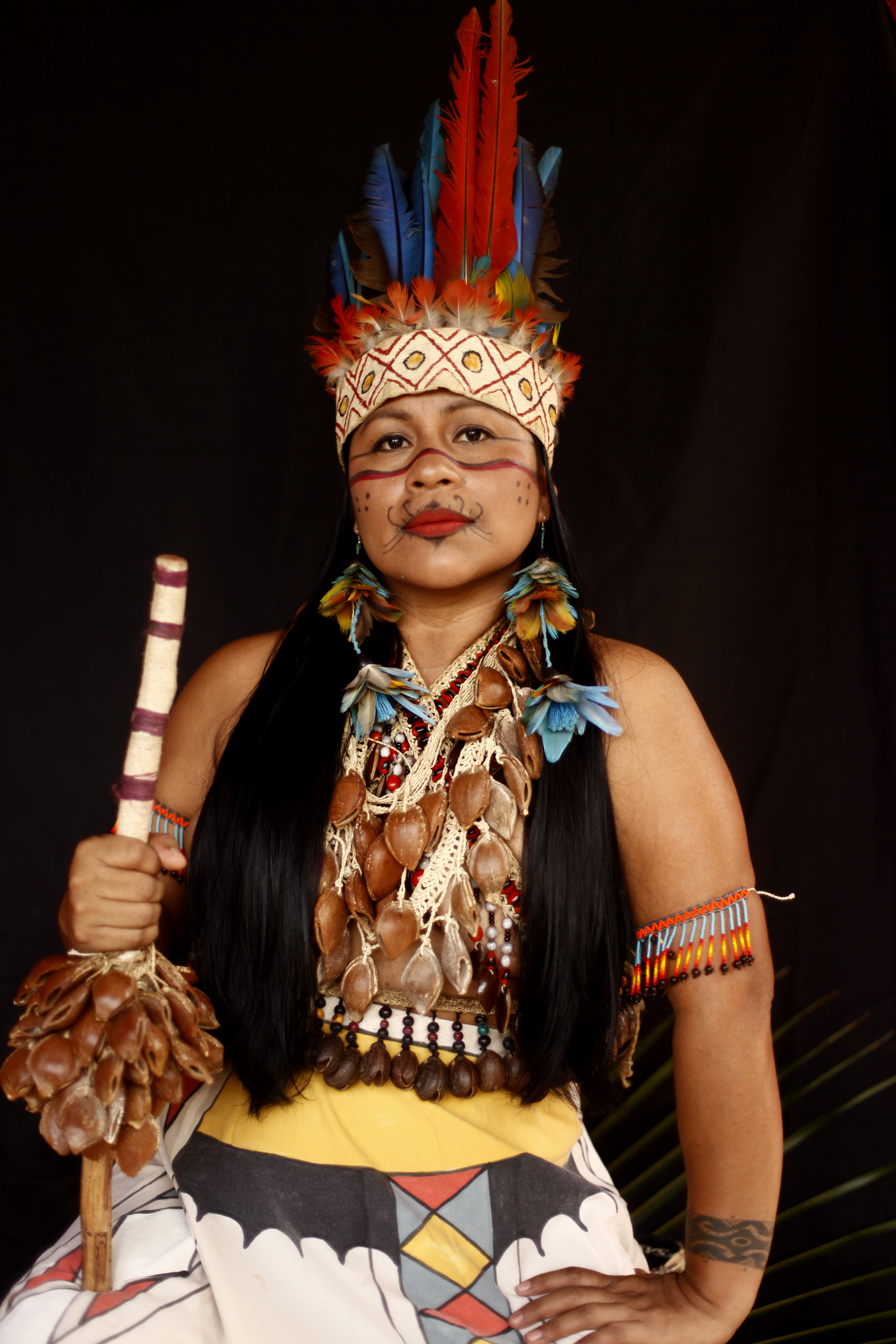

Background information
- Born: Denizia Araújo Peres; 1984 (age 41–42); Terra Indígena Umariaçu II, Tabatinga, Amazonas, Brazil
- Genres: Indie pop, alternative music
- Instrument: Vocals

Denizia Araújo Peres, professionally known as Djuena Tikuna (born 1984) is a Ticuna Brazilian singer, one of the most prominent figures in indigenous music in Brazil. In 2017 she became the first indigenous person to perform a musical show at the Amazon Theatre in Manaus, where she presented her album Tchautchiüãne. All her compositions are sung in the Ticuna language.

== Career ==
Djuena was born in 1984 in Terra Indígena Umariaçu II, Tabatinga, Amazonas, Brazil, the daughter of Nutchametüku and Totchimaüna. She moved with her family to Manaus, when she was only seven years old, and where her father, who was a fisherman, found work as a security guard. At school, Djuena had difficulty speaking and writing Portuguese because she only spoke Ticuna, and to learn she began writing poetry and composing music. Her mother was singer in the traditional indigenous musical group Wotchimaücü, and her maternal grandmother also sang.

In 2006, Djuena formed the musical group Magüita with her brothers, which performed in downtown Manaus and helped boost her career as a singer receiving invitations to sing at universities and schools.

On 3 August 2016, Djuena sang the Brazilian National Anthem in Ticuna during the first inauguration of the first event before the opening of the 2016 Summer Olympics in Rio de Janeiro. In August 2017, she became the first indigenous woman to perform a musical show at the Amazon Theatre in Manaus, presenting her album Tchautchiüãne to an audience of more than 800 people. That album was nominated for that year Indigenous Music Awards for Best International Indigenous Artist. That year she participated in the musical campaign “Demarcação Já” alongside Chico César, Gilberto Gil, Maria Bethânia, Ney Matogrosso, Elza Soares, Dona Odette, and Lenine.

In 2018, at the age of 33, she became the first indigenous woman to graduate in journalism from the Centro Universitário do Norte. That year, she organised the first Indigenous Music Exhibition (WIYAE) and performed a series of concerts in São Paulo. In 2019 she was an artist at Sonora Brasil a project that takes indigenous music groups on tour throughout the country.

That year Djuena also released his second album, Wiyaegü, which she presented in Paris, Amsterdam, Brussels, and Vienna. Back in Brazil, Djuena participated in the YBY Festival in São Paulo, the country's first indigenous music festival.

During the COVID-19 pandemic in Brazil, she participated in campaigns and projects to help vulnerable indigenous families during lockdown. Back at the Amazonas Theater in 2022, she presented her work Torü Wiyaegü, consisting of a book, an album, and a short film about her people.

In March 2023, Djuena Tikuna participated in the concert “We are the Forest,” held at the Amazonas Theater, together with the Massachusetts Institute of Technology Orchestra from the United States. In April, together with the Tatuí Conservatory Symphony Orchestra, conducted by Emmanuele Baldini, Djuena gave two performances in São Paulo. That same month, she performed the Brazilian national anthem in Ticuna at the National Congress during a session honoring the 19th Acampamento Terra Livre. In 2024 Djuena performed at the Brazil Conference at Harvard & MIT in Boston.

Djuena performed the national anthem during the inauguration of Maria Elizabeth Rocha as president of the Superior Military Court in March 2025.

== Awards ==
- Music Grain Award (2021)

== Discography ==
- Tchautchiüãne (2017)
- Wiyaegü (2019)
- Torü Wiyaegü (2022)

=== Soundtrack vocals ===
- Yanuni (2025), documentary
