= Juma Xipaia =

Brazilian activist

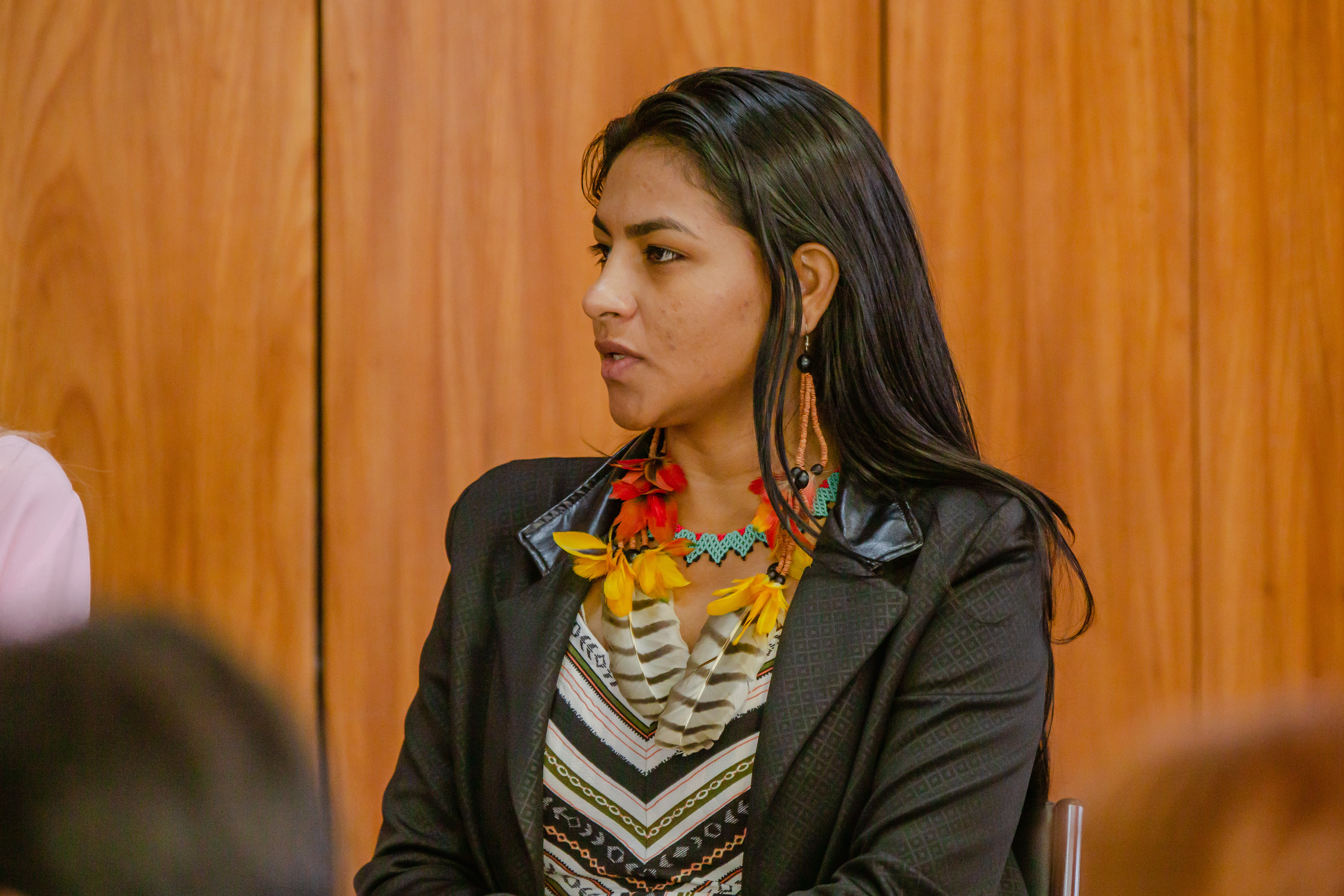
- Juma Xipaia in 2023
- Born: 1991 (age 34–35); Tucamã, Pará, Brazil
- Citizenship: Brazilian (Xipaya)
- Occupations: Indigenous leader, activist, medical student
- Known for: First female chief of the Middle Xingu; resistance to Belo Monte Dam; founder of Instituto Juma

Juma Xipaia (born 1991) is an Indigenous Brazilian activist, leader of the Xipaya people, and the first woman to serve as chief of the Middle Xingu region. She is internationally recognized for her advocacy for Indigenous rights, environmental protection, and her resistance against the Belo Monte hydroelectric dam project in the Amazon.

== Early life and education ==
Juma Xipaia was born in 1991 in the village of Tucamã, on the Iriri River in Pará, Brazil. Growing up in a small Indigenous community, she witnessed the profound cultural and environmental changes brought by outside development. At age 13, she began participating in activism, inspired by the struggles of neighboring communities against large infrastructure projects.

In 2006, she left her village to pursue education in Altamira and later studied law in Belém. Disillusioned by the gap between law and justice, she left law school after two years and is currently a medical student at the Federal University of Pará.

== Leadership and activism ==
At age 24, Xipaia became the first female chief (cacica) of the Middle Xingu region, leading the village of Tukamã. Her leadership broke gender barriers in a traditionally male-dominated role and brought new perspectives to Indigenous governance.

She is best known for her outspoken resistance to the Belo Monte hydroelectric dam, a massive project on the Xingu River that has caused displacement, environmental damage, and cultural loss for Indigenous and riverine communities. Xipaia exposed corruption related to the dam's construction and denounced the lack of consultation with Indigenous peoples, which led to threats, intimidation, and a near-fatal attempt on her life and her children.

In 2017, after repeated threats and an assassination attempt, Xipaia fled to Switzerland for a year, where she addressed the United Nations and filed formal complaints about the violence and environmental destruction in the Amazon. She later returned to Brazil, stating that "nothing was worse than being away from my children for safety reasons".

== Ongoing work and Instituto Juma ==
Back in the Amazon, Xipaia continues to advocate for Indigenous rights, environmental protection, and the preservation of traditional knowledge. In 2020, she founded the Instituto Juma, which promotes Indigenous autonomy, sustainable development, and cultural revitalization. She also serves as an advisor to the Xingu Women's Movement and supports initiatives to blend traditional and scientific knowledge for the benefit of her community.

Her community is currently building the village of Carimã as a center for traditional medicine and sustainable practices.

== Threats and advocacy ==
Xipaia has faced persistent threats from illegal miners, loggers, and those with interests in land and resource exploitation. She continues to speak out against violence, ethnocide, and the environmental impacts of extractive industries, emphasizing the urgent need for Indigenous voices in decision-making about the Amazon's future.

== In popular culture ==
A documentary film titled Yanuni directed by Richard Ladkani, highlighting Juma’s role in defending her people and the rainforest against illegal mining, land-grabbing, and corporate exploitation had its world premiere at the Tribeca Film Festival on 14 June 2025.
