= Patrick Pichette =

Canadian business executive and entrepreneur (born 1962)

Patrick Pichette CQ
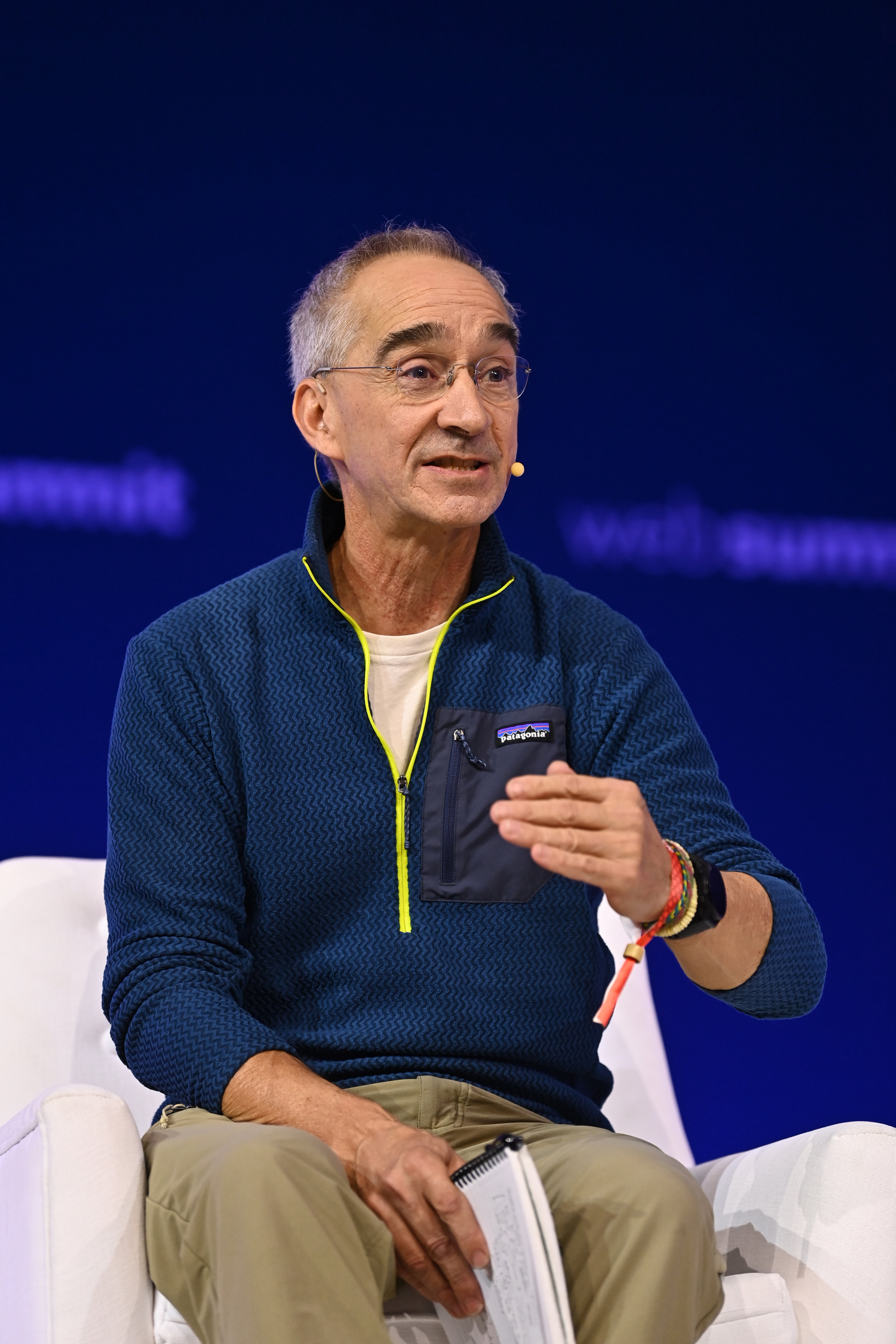
- Pichette in 2022
- Born: 1962 (age 63–64); Montreal, Quebec, Canada
- Education: Université du Québec à Montréal (BBA, 1987); University of Oxford (MA)
- Occupations: Business executive; venture capitalist
- Board member of: Twitter, Inc. (former); Lightspeed; Trudeau Foundation (former)
- Awards: National Order of Québec
- Website: www.inovia.vc/people/patrick-pichette

Patrick Pichette CQ (born 1962) is a Canadian business executive and venture capitalist who was the senior vice president and the chief financial officer of Google from 2008 until 2015. He then became a venture capital fund manager, and is a director for several companies and a foundation. In September 2026 he was appointed CEO of Digital Transformation Canada.

== Early life and education ==
Pichette was born in 1962 and raised in Montreal, Quebec. He holds a Bachelor of Business Administration degree from Université du Québec à Montréal (1987) and a Master of Arts degree in philosophy, politics and economics from Pembroke College of the University of Oxford. He received a Rhodes Scholarship.

== Career ==
Pichette began his career in 1989 as an associate at McKinsey & Company in Toronto. In 1994, he left to become vice president and chief financial officer (CFO) of Toronto-based Call-Net Enterprises, but rejoined McKinsey in 1996 after Call-Net's acquisition by Rogers Communications. He joined BCE Inc. in 2001 as an executive vice president. From 2002 to 2003, he had a brief stint as Bell Canada's CFO, before transitioning to the role of president of operations which he held from 2004 to 2008.

He was senior vice president and CFO of Google Inc. from 2008 until 2015.

In April 2011, it was announced that Pichette would also be taking over human resources responsibilities within Google from vice president Laszlo Bock, and BizOps from Shona Brown.

In 2013, Pichette accepted a position on the board of directors for Bombardier Inc., a position he held until 2017.

In March 2015, he announced he would retire to travel the world. He was succeeded as CFO by Ruth Porat.

In June 2015, he received the National Order of Québec.

In April 2018, he joined Inovia Capital, a venture capital firm with offices in Montreal, Toronto, San Francisco and London. After becoming a general partner at Inovia Capital, Pichette is splitting his time between the firm's offices in London, Canada and Silicon Valley.

In 2019, Pichette became a lead founding member of UK's Creative Destruction Lab at Oxford.

In 2021, Pichette was appointed as a board member of indoor cycling app company Zwift.

Pichette was appointed independent board chair of Twitter, Inc. on June 2, 2020. He served as lead independent director from 2018–2022. After Elon Musk's acquisition of Twitter in October 2022, Musk fired the entire board of directors, including Pichette, leaving Musk as the sole board member.

Pichette serves on the Board of Directors as chair of the board at Montreal-based company Lightspeed. He joined in October 2018 and took the position of Lead Independent Chair in February 2022. He served chair of the board of directors at the Trudeau Foundation from November 2018 until March 2021. Pichette is a board advisor to the start-up Arctoris.

At the 2026 Liberal Convention, Pichette controversially proposed a $500,000 exit tax for all Canadian graduates seeking to leave the country to address Canada's brain drain issues.

== Personal life ==
Pichette lives in London, and is married to Tamar Pichette, with whom he has three children.

He and his wife Tamar are involved in philanthropic projects including a conservation and research project with Nature Conservancy of Canada in protecting Kenauk, a 65,000 acre territory between Montreal and Ottawa. They are active partners in a project with Himalayan Cataract Project, building an eye hospital in Ethiopia.
