= Vend (software) =

Financial services & Retail management company

Vend Limited
- Type: Private
- Industry: Point of sale
- Founded: 2010; 16 years ago
- Founder: Vaughan Rowsell
- Headquarters: Auckland, New Zealand
- Area served: United States, United Kingdom, Australia, Canada, New Zealand
- Key people: Ana Wight (CEO)
- Services: Point-of-sale; Ecommerce; Retail training
- Owner: Lightspeed Commerce, Inc.
- Number of employees: 459 (2019)
- Website: www.vendhq.com

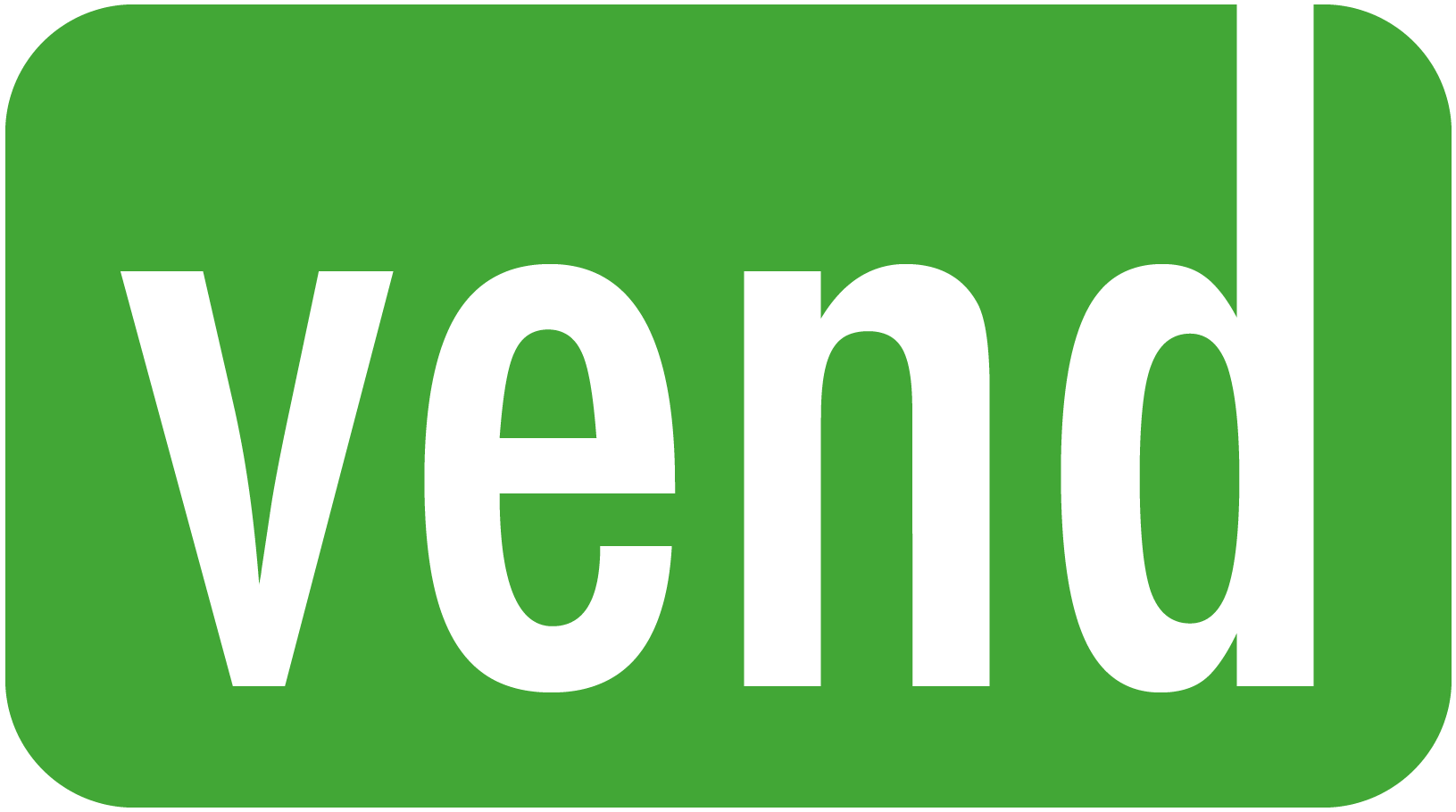
Previous logo

Vend is cloud-based point-of-sale and retail management software company, based in Auckland, New Zealand. The company was founded in 2010 by Vaughan Rowsell. It was acquired by the Canadian software company Lightspeed Commerce in 2021.

== History of Vend ==
Vend was launched in August 2010 by software developer Vaughan Rowsell.

In 2013, Vend raised 8 million (8.000.000) NZD of funding from investors in Australia and New Zealand. Further capital has also been raised from existing investors including Point Nine Capital in Berlin.

The following year, Vend closed 20 million (20,000,000) US$25 million (25,000,000) in Series B funding. The funding round was co-led by Peter Thiel and Square Peg Capital in Australia. Later in 2014, the company also opened offices in Toronto and London. In August 2015, Vend announced that it had raised 12 million (12,000,000) NZD, mainly from existing investors along with new entrant Punakaiki Fund.

In 2015, Vend launched Vend Ecommerce. It also announced a partnership with UK payments provider iZettle, and North American payments provider Mercury (now Vantiv).

In 2016, the company partnered with Square to enable retailers who use Vend's software to process payments with Square.

In 2016 Vend also launched an app for inventory management named Counter.

At the end of 2016, Vend raised a further 9 million (9,000,000) US$13 million (13,000,000 NZD) led by existing investors, and with significant new investment from fund manager Movac. In 2016 Vend grew its UK staff to 20 and opened a new office in East London.

In 2017, Vend renamed its inventory app Counter to Scanner by Vend.

On 12 March 2021, Vend was sold to Lightspeed POS Inc. for US$335 million (455 million NZD). The company had approximately 150 staff at this time.

== Features ==
Vend's services include web-based POS software, inventory management, E-commerce, customer loyalty, and reporting analytics. Vend integrates with other business and payments applications including Shopify, Square, Xero and PayPal.

Vend's software allows merchants to generate reports on sales, inventory, and customer behavior. Vend Ecommerce and integrations with partners like Shopify and WooCommerce enable retailers to sell online.

== Technology ==
Vend uses HTML5 features in Google Chrome and Safari to implement offline processing capabilities.

- A webSQL database built into the browser provides local inventory storage so sales can be processed offline and all stock levels updated.
- HTML5’s offline manifest tells the browser to take copies of certain files and pages for offline use.
- WebSocket (another element of HTML5) allows Vend to talk to other devices on a local network, interfacing with hardware such as an EFTPOS unit or other payment devices.

Vend works with mobile browsers as well as their iOS app called Vend Register.

== Awards and recognition ==
- 2011 NZ Innovators Awards – ICT category and Supreme Award
- 2014 NZ Hi-Tech Awards – IBM Hi-Tech Exporter of the Year (under $5 million revenue) and Cisco Hi-Tech Emerging Company of the Year categories
- 2014 Gold Stevie Award for Vend's homepage video (American Business Awards)
- 2014 Monocle Magazines's Top 25 in Retail
- 2015 Gold Stevie Award for Customer Service (American Business Awards)
- 2015 Silver Stevie Award for Vend's video with TopShelf Style (American Business Awards)
- 2015 Deloitte NZ Fast50 – 7th fastest growing company in NZ
- 2015 Industry Specific App of the Year – Xero UK
- 2016 Deloitte NZ Fast50 – 38th fastest growing company in NZ
- 2016 TIN100 Hot Emerging Companies New Zealand (2nd)
- 2017 Vend named as the best all-in-one POS system for small businesses by Business News Daily
- 2019 Newsweek Best Business Tools – POS
