= The Devil's Miner =

- Promotional poster for The Devils Miner
- Directed by: Kief Davidson; Richard Ladkani
- Written by: Kief Davidson; Richard Ladkani
- Produced by: Kief Davidson; Richard Ladkani
- Starring: Basilio Vargas; The miners of Cerro Rico
- Distributed by: Cinema Delicatessen (theatrical); First Run Features (theatrical); YLE Teema (TV)
- Release date: November 30, 2005
- Running time: 82 minutes
- Language: Spanish/English

The Devil's Miner is a 2005 documentary film directed by independent film directors Kief Davidson and Richard Ladkani. The film follows a fourteen-year-old Bolivian boy named Basilio Vargas who along with his twelve-year-old brother Bernardino work in the mines near the city of Potosí. The film includes many subtle realities of the miner's lives such as the need to chew coca leaves to numb the pain of hunger and the long shifts they work regardless of age. The film made its world premier at the Rotterdam film festival and its U.S. debut at the Tribeca Film Festival.

The film concentrates on the concerns of local workers who have fear of what they call “Tio” or devil. In the film, an elder miner claims that over 8 million people have died in the unsafe mines. The workers believe this is because “Tio” controls the mine and that Christ has no power in the mine. The workers often give offerings such as coca leaves, alcohol, cigarettes and perform sacrifices, such as slaughtering a llama and applying its blood to the mine entrance to appease a makeshift statue of "Tio". Each mine has its own Tio which all of the workers pray to upon entering so that they may find a good vein of silver and so that they may be granted protection from explosions, toxic gas, silicosis, and falling rocks. The local Catholic priest is unable to tame these fears of “Tio” although the workers often pray at the church before entering the mine, upon observing the miners attending Mass, the local priest said that when he looked into the face of the miners he "saw Christ dying". The irony which is upon these people is one of great sorrow. They worship both God and the Devil, Light and Dark, The God of the world, and the god of the earthen mine below.

As of 2014, Basilio is studying tourism, working in the mines three nights a week, and working as a tour guide in the mines. Bernardino, now married, still works in the mines full-time whilst studying in the evenings. The boys no longer live on the mountain, however their mother remains in the same house.

== Reception ==
On review aggregator website Rotten Tomatoes, the film holds an approval rating of 93% based on 27 reviews, with an average rating of 7.6/10.

== See also ==
- Minerita, a documentary film about women miners of the Cerro Rico
