= A Lego Brickumentary =

A LEGO Brickumentary
- Theatrical release poster
- Directed by: Kief Davidson; Daniel Junge
- Written by: Davis Coombe; Kief Davidson; Daniel Junge
- Produced by: Chris Brown; Daniel Junge; Brendan Kiernan; Justin Moore-Lewy; Gustavo Gelmini
- Narrated by: Jason Bateman
- Cinematography: Luke Geissbühler; Robert Muratore
- Edited by: Davis Coombe; Tiffany Hauck; Chad Herschberger; Marc Jakubowicz; Inbal B. Lessner; Darrin Roberts
- Music by: John Jennings Boyd
- Production companies: Global Emerging Markets; HeLo; The Lego Group
- Distributed by: RADiUS-TWC
- Release dates: April 20, 2014 (Tribeca); July 31, 2015 (U.S.)
- Running time: 93 minutes
- Countries: Denmark; United States
- Language: English
- Budget: $1 million
- Box office: $101,531

A Lego Brickumentary (also known as Beyond the Brick: A Lego Brickumentary) is a 2014 documentary film directed by Kief Davidson and Daniel Junge, focused on the Danish construction toy Lego. The film was released on July 31, 2015. The film received mixed reviews from critics, who praised its appeal but criticized the promotional tone of the film. It grossed over $100,000 against a production budget of $1 million, although it fared better in home media sales.

== Synopsis ==
A Lego Brickumentary offers a look at the global appeal of Lego toys.

== Cast ==
- Jason Bateman as narrator
- Jamie Berard as himself
- Alice Finch as herself
- Bret Harris as himself
- G.W. Krauss as himself
- Dan Legoff as himself
- Nathan Sawaya as himself
- Brian Whitaker as himself
- Iain Clifford Heath as himself
- Ed Sheeran as himself
- Trey Parker as himself
- Dwight Howard as himself
- David Pagano as himself
- Phil Lord as Writer/Director/Himself
- Christopher Miller as Writer/Director/Himself

== Release ==
The film had its premiere at the 2014 Tribeca Film Festival on April 20, and was released in theaters on July 31, 2015.

== Reception ==
=== Commercial performance ===
The film grossed $101,531 in theaters against a production budget of $1 million, in addition to $427,757 in domestic DVD sales.

=== Critical reception ===
The film received mixed reviews from critics. Review aggregator website Rotten Tomatoes reports a 55% rating based on 49 reviews, with an average score of 5.41/10. The website's critics consensus reads: "A LEGO Brickumentary offers a cheerful overview of the popular toy that should satisfy diehard enthusiasts, but its aggressively promotional tone may turn off LEGO agnostics." On Metacritic, the film has a 51 out of 100 rating based on 19 critics, indicating "mixed or average" reviews.

Peter Sobczynski of RogerEbert.com gave the film two-and-a-half stars out of five. Peter Debruge of Variety writes that the film feels like a "glorified DVD extra" for The Lego Movie. Spectrum Culture wrote that "Brickumentary is both interesting and informative as well as being fun. There may be no “other side” to this documentary, but it does, indeed, give great depth to the toy, its inception and evolution. It also manages, quite successfully, to never, ever be boring." Jordan Hoffman of the New York Daily News gave the film one out of five stars, noting "As a movie, it can be as annoying as stepping on a stray LEGO brick with your socks off."
