= Minerita =

- Directed by: Raúl de la Fuente
- Written by: Raúl de la Fuente
- Produced by: Amaia Remirez
- Music by: Mikel Salas
- Production company: Kanaki Films
- Release date: April 17, 2013 (Tribeca Film Festival)
- Running time: 28 minutes
- Countries: Spain; Bolivia
- Language: Spanish

Minerita is a 2013 Spanish short-documentary film about three women working the Potosi mines in Bolivia. The documentary was well received by critics and earned widespread critical acclaim. Minerita was shortlisted with nine other documentaries from 74 entries submitted to the 88th Academy Awards in the Documentary Short Subject category, but was not nominated as a finalist.

== Synopsis ==
Minerita is the story of three women—Lucía (40), Ivone (16) and Abigail (17), who work as night watch women in the Cerro Rico mining district in Potosi, Bolivia.

== Awards ==
- Social Impact Media Awards - Best Short Documentary Director.
- 28th Goya Awards - Best Documentary Short Film.

== See also ==
- The Devil's Miner, a documentary film about child miners of the Cerro Rico.
