= Glenrothan =

2025 film by Brian Cox

- Theatrical release poster
- Directed by: Brian Cox
- Written by: David Ashton; Jeff Murphy
- Produced by: Brian Cox; Neil Zeiger; Crystine Zhang; Phin Glynn; Nic Crum; James Cabourne; Vladimir Zemtsov
- Starring: Alan Cumming; Brian Cox; Shirley Henderson; Alexandra Shipp; Siobhan Redmond
- Cinematography: Jaime Ackroyd
- Production companies: Nevision; Blazing Griffin Pictures
- Distributed by: Lionsgate
- Release dates: 11 September 2025 (TIFF); 17 April 2026 (United Kingdom)
- Running time: 99 minutes
- Country: United Kingdom
- Language: English

Glenrothan is a 2025 British comedy-drama film directed by Brian Cox in his feature directorial debut. Described as a "love letter to Scotland", it stars Cox and Alan Cumming.

Glenrothan premiered at the 50th Toronto International Film Festival on 11 September 2025, and was released in the United Kingdom by Lionsgate on 17 April 2026.

== Premise ==
After 40 years abroad, Donal returns to Scotland to make amends with his brother, Sandy.

== Cast ==
- Alan Cumming as Donal
- Brian Cox as Sandy
- Shirley Henderson as Jess
- Alexandra Shipp as Amy
- Siobhan Redmond as Gus

== Production ==
The film was announced in September 2021. Director Brian Cox had previous worked on the radio drama series McLevy, written by David Ashton, who also co-wrote the screenplay for Glenrothan. Producer Neil Zeiger later urged Cox to direct Glenrothan himself, and he accepted.

Principal photography began in Scotland in August 2024. Filming locations included Glasgow and the village of Gartmore. Production wrapped in October 2024.

== Release ==
Protagonist Pictures owns the international sales rights to the film. It premiered at the 50th Toronto International Film Festival on 11 September 2025. It was also screened in the Grand Public section of the 20th Rome Film Festival in October 2025.

Glenrothan closed the 37th Palm Springs International Film Festival on January 12, 2026.

The film was released cinematically in the United Kingdom on 17 April 2026.

== Reception ==
On review aggregator website Rotten Tomatoes, the film holds an approval rating of 19% based on 26 reviews, with an average rating of 4.0/10.

== Accolades ==
Award	Date of ceremony	Category	Recipient	Result	Ref.
National Film Awards UK	July 1, 2026	Best Drama	Glenrothan	Nominated	
National Film Awards UK	July 1, 2026	Best Feature Film	Glenrothan	Won	
National Film Awards UK	July 1, 2026	Best Actor	Brian Cox	Nominated	
National Film Awards UK	July 1, 2026	Best Actor	Alan Cumming	Nominated	
National Film Awards UK	July 1, 2026	Best Director	Brian Cox	Nominated	
National Film Awards UK	July 1, 2026	Best Comedy	Glenrothan	Nominated	
