= Kief Davidson =

American filmmaker

Kief Davidson is an American filmmaker.

== Biography ==
Davidson was nominated for an Academy Award for Best Documentary Short at the 2013 Academy Awards for his work on Open Heart with Cori Shepherd Stern.

Academy Award^{®} nominated director, Emmy^{®} winner and DGA nominee, Kief Davidson is renowned for his unique cinematic style and known for crafting films that both inspire and entertain. His work has premiered in film festivals from Sundance to Telluride, Toronto and AFI and has launched in cinemas across the country, streaming platforms and network television. Working across many genre’s titles include, BAD INFLUENCE, MELTDOWN: THREE MILE ISLAND, THE IVORY GAME, WHO SHOT THE SHERIFF, OPEN HEART, BENDING THE ARC, A LEGO BRICKUMENTARY, KASSIM THE DREAM AND THE DEVIL’S MINER.

Davidson founded Decoy Productions, a Los Angeles based film and television production company devoted to creating elevated premium non-fiction and scripted content.

== Filmography ==
- 1994: Blood Ties: The Life and Work of Sally Mann (Documentary short, editor)
- 1998: Minor Details (Director and screenwriter)
- 2000: South Park (TV series, actor, credited as Keef Davidson)
- 2002: Exotic Islands (TV series, director, editor, writer and producer)
- 2003: Richard Pryor: I Ain't Dead Yet, #*%$#@!! (Documentary TV special, additional editor)
- 2005: The Devil's Miner (Documentary, director, editor, writer and producer)
- 2005: Robert Klein: The Amorous Busboy of Decatur Avenue (TV movie, editor)
- 2005: Happy Days: 30th Anniversary Reunion (TV documentary, additional editor)
- 2006: Independent Lens (TV documentary series, director, editor, screenwriter and producer)
- 2008: Kassim the Dream (Documentary film, director, editor, screenwriter and producer)
- 2011: Comic-Con Episode IV: A Fan's Hope (Documentary, producer)
- 2012: Emergency (Documentary short film, director, producer)
- 2012: Open Heart (Documentary, director, editor and producer)
- 2014: A Lego Brickumentary (Documentary, director and screenwriter)
- 2015: Saving Sight (Short film, director)
- 2016: The Ivory Game: (Documentary, director, Producer)
- 2017: Bending the Arc (Documentary, director)
- 2018: Remastered: Who Shot the Sheriff (Director, Producer)
- 2020: The Most Dangerous Animal of All (Director, creator)
- 2022: Meltdown: Three Mile Island (Director, Executive Producer)
- 2023: Heroes For the Planet (Director, Producer)
- 2025: The Royal Stunt (Director, Producer)
- 2025: Bad Influence (Director, Executive Producer)
