= ShopKeep =

ShopKeep by Lightspeed
- Type: Subsidiary
- Industry: Point of sale
- Founded: 2008; 18 years ago
- Founders: Jason Richelson; David Olk
- Headquarters: New York City, U.S.
- Area served: United States; Canada
- Key people: Michael DeSimone (CEO)
- Number of employees: 200+
- Parent: Lightspeed
- Website: shopkeep.com

ShopKeep by Lightspeed is a cloud-based iPad point of sale (POS) system headquartered in New York, NY. Founded in 2008, its POS system is used by more than 23,000 small businesses in the United States and Canada, most of which are retail shops, coffee shops, restaurants, and bars. The system allows merchants to ring up sales, print or email receipts, pop a cash drawer, accept credit cards and print remotely to the kitchen right from an iPad or Android tablet. The web-based BackOffice allows inventory, employee, and customer management, and analytics and reporting. The smartphone dashboard app allows merchants to view real-time store sales remotely.

== History ==
ShopKeep was co-founded by Jason Richelson, co-founder of several retail stores in Brooklyn and New York City, and Amy Bennett out of their wine store in Brooklyn in the fall of 2008 after their point of sale software crashed for the last time. David Olk, former Director of M&A at IAC, joined as the third co-founder and COO in July 2011 to help Jason and Amy execute on their vision and raise outside capital, eventually closing the company's first external raise 6 months later in December 2011. When Jason's point of sale system in his stores broke down, he decided that there had to be a simpler, smarter solution for small businesses. He developed ShopKeep POS as a cloud-based point of sale system to allow a merchants to access data even when they are not in the store. He also developed it from the eyes of a retailer and used his expertise to create a user interface that is intuitive to the merchants and the cashiers that stand behind the counter. Jason hired Bill Walton as the original system architect and engineer to build the ShopKeep Platform in October 2008.

In August 2011, the first iPad version of ShopKeep was released in the App Store. As of July 2015, ShopKeep has raised over $97 million in funding.

On 5 November 2020, Lightspeed announced it has entered into a definitive agreement to acquire ShopKeep Inc for $440 million. On 25 November 2020, Lightspeed announced closing the acquisition of ShopKeep.

== See also ==
- Point of sale display
- Tech companies in the New York metropolitan area
- EMV
- Cyber security standards
- List of cyber attack threat trends
- Malware
