= Yanuni =

2025 documentary film

- Promotional poster
- Directed by: Richard Ladkani
- Written by: Richard Ladkani
- Produced by: Juma Xipaia; Leonardo DiCaprio; Anita Ladkani; Richard Ladkani; Jennifer Davisson; Phillip Watson
- Starring: Juma Xipaia; Hugo Loss; Tuppak Tawary Xipaia; Yanuni Xipaia Loss
- Cinematography: Richard Ladkani
- Edited by: Georg M. Fischer
- Music by: Score: H. Scott Salinas; Original Title Song: Katú Mirim
- Production companies: Malaika Pictures; Tellux Film; Nia Tero; Appian Way Productions
- Distributed by: Submarine Entertainment
- Release date: June 14, 2025 (Tribeca)
- Running time: 112 minutes
- Countries: Austria; Brazil; United States; Canada; Germany
- Languages: Brazilian Portuguese; English

Yanuni is a 2025 documentary film written, directed and co-produced by Richard Ladkani. Leonardo DiCaprio is also one of the co-producer of the film which is about Indigenous chief Juma Xipaia of Xipaya people, who fights to protect tribal lands despite assassination attempts.

The film had its world premiere at the Tribeca Film Festival on 14 June 2025. It was part of the Closing Night Gala at the festival.

It was shortlisted for the Best Documentary Feature Film at the 98th Academy Awards.

== Summary ==
The film follows the life and activism of Juma Xipaia, an Indigenous leader from the Brazilian Amazon. The film traces her journey from her community in Xipaya territory to national politics, where she became Brazil's first Secretary of Articulation and Promotion of Indigenous Rights under President Luiz Inácio Lula da Silva. It highlights Juma's role in defending her people and the rainforest against illegal mining, land-grabbing, and corporate exploitation, despite surviving multiple assassination attempts. It also portrays her partnership with Hugo Loss, her husband and head of Special Operations at Brazilian Institute of Environment and Renewable Natural Resources, Brazil's environmental protection agency, who conducts high-risk missions to dismantle illegal mining camps.

Balancing political responsibilities, personal sacrifice, and impending motherhood, Juma's story is presented as both a personal narrative and a broader reflection on Indigenous sovereignty, environmental justice, and the struggle to protect the Amazon. The film combines intimate storytelling with urgent political themes, framing Yanuni as both a portrait of resilience and a call to action for future generations.

== Cast ==
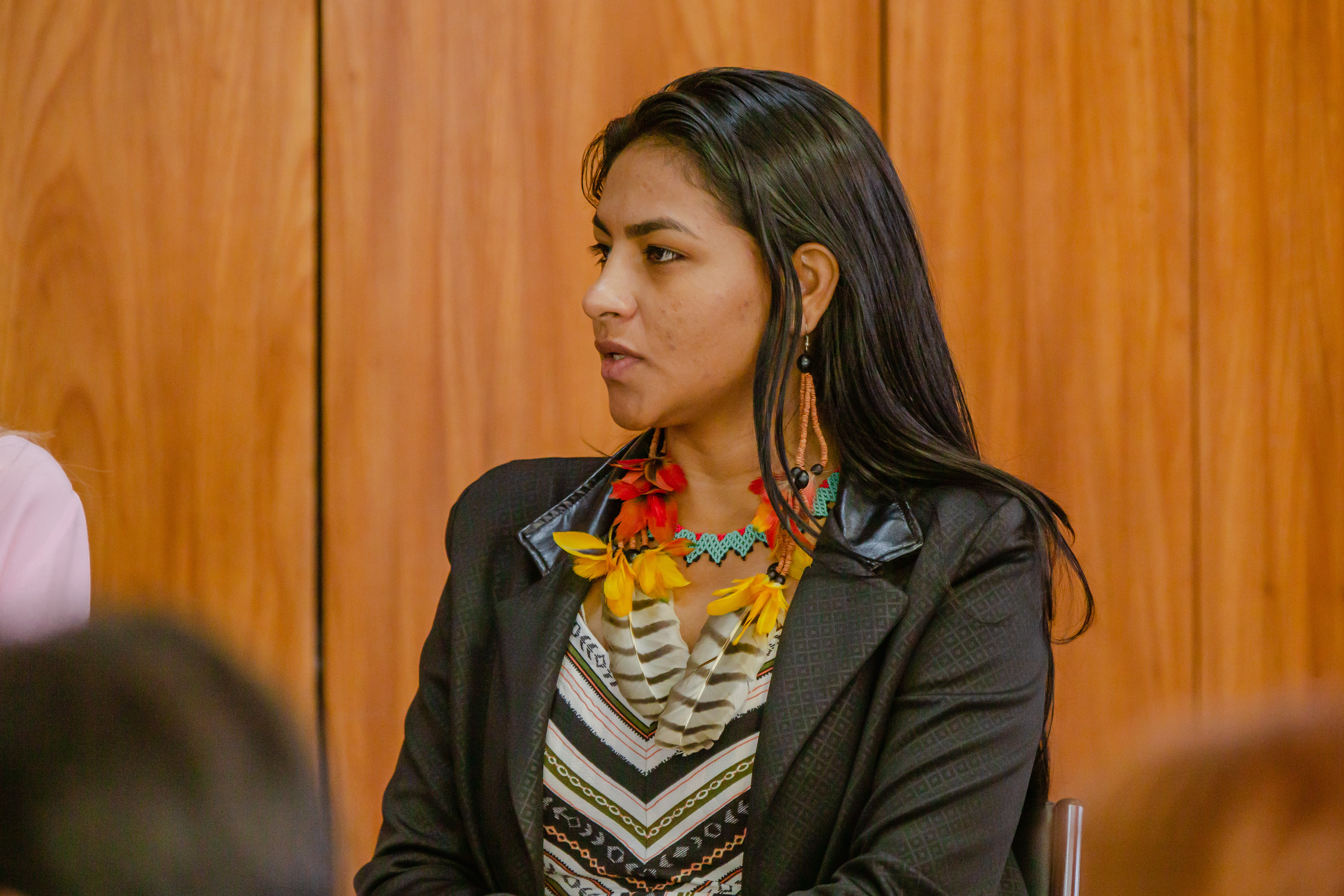
Juma Xipaia in 2023

- Juma Xipaia
- Hugo Loss
- Tuppak Tawary Xipaia
- Yanuni Xipaia Loss

== Production ==
The name "Yanuni" refers to Xipaia's unborn daughter, representing the emergence of new life amid a turbulent and challenging environment. Her anticipated arrival also introduces an element of optimism, highlighting the broader significance of the struggle and the individuals who stand to benefit from its outcome.

The film was produced with the production funding of €895.793 from the Austrian Film Institute.

Richard Ladkani, the director used drone footage and news clips to present the happenings in the Amazon.

=== Music ===
The score of the film is composed by H. Scott Salinas, with the support of Argentine composer Tomás Videla, in collaboration with Indigenous leader and musician Eric Terena, who also served as an executive producer of the film. The score features Indigenous vocalist Djuena Tikuna, a Ticuna Brazilian singer, as well as Terena and the Vienna Synchronstage Orchestra. The soundtrack also includes "No Front" ("on the frontline"), a song written and performed by Indigenous rapper and singer Katú Mirim about the illegal extraction of oil and gold from Indigenous territories in the Amazon. The music for Yanuni was recorded across multiple locations, including Santa Monica, Vienna, São Paulo, and Manaus.

== Release ==
Yanuni had its world premiere at the Tribeca Film Festival on 14 June 2025 as the closing film of the festival. It had its International premiere at the Sheffield DocFest on 20 June 2025.

It opened Los Angeles Brazilian Film Festival on 13 October 2025.

It competed at the Savannah Film Festival in Documentary Features on 26 October 2025.

The film competed at the Red Nation Film Festival for Red Nation Awards on 14 November 2025.

The film was presented in the True Stories section of the 37th Palm Springs International Film Festival on 2 January 2026, where it won Best Documentary Award Special Mention in Documentary competition.

== Accolades ==
| Award | Date of ceremony | Category | Recipient(s) | Result | Ref. |
|---|---|---|---|---|---|
| Montrose LandxSea Environmental Film Festival | September 14, 2025 | Audience Award | Yanuni | Won | |
| Jackson Wild Media Awards | October 2, 2025 | Best Feature Documentary | Yanuni | Won | |
| Jackson Wild Media Awards | October 2, 2025 | Grand Teton Award | Yanuni | Won | |
| Savannah Film Festival | 3 November 2025 | Best Documentary Feature | Yanuni | Won | |
| Savannah Film Festival | 3 November 2025 | Best Director | Richard Ladkani | Won | |
| Environmental Media Association | November 10, 2025 | EMA Award Documentary Film | Yanuni | Won | |
| Red Nation Film Festival | 16 November 2025 | Best Documentary Feature | Yanuni | Won | |
| Films from the South | 16 November 2025 | Doc:South Best Documentary | Yanuni | Won | |
| Los Angeles Brazilian Film Festival | October 16, 2025 | Best Feature Documentary | Yanuni | Won | |
| Planet in Focus Environmental Film Festival | October 31, 2025 | Best International Feature Documentary | Yanuni | Won | |
| Planet in Focus Environmental Film Festival | October 31, 2025 | International Eco Hero Award | Juma Xipaia | Won | |
| São Paulo International Film Festival | October 30, 2025 | Audience Award: Best International Documentary | Yanuni | Won | |
| International Documentary Association | 6 December 2025 | Best Cinematography | Richard Ladkani | Nominated | |
| International Documentary Association | 6 December 2025 | Best Feature Documentary | Yanuni | Special Mention | |
| Academy of Motion Picture Arts and Sciences | December 16, 2025 | Best Documentary Feature Film (Shortlisted) | Yanuni | Shortlisted | |
| Suncine International Environmental Film Festival | November 23, 2025 | Best Documentary Golden Sun Award | Yanuni | Won | |
| Palm Springs International Film Festival | 12 January 2026 | Best Documentary Award Special Mention | Yanuni | Won | |
| DC Environmental Film Festival | February 12, 2026 | Shared Earth Foundation Award for Advocacy | Yanuni | Won | |
| Cinema for Peace | February 16, 2026 | International Green Film Award | Yanuni | Won | |

== See also ==
- Academy Award for Best Documentary Feature Film
- Submissions for the Academy Award for Best Documentary Feature
