= Xipaya people =

Indigenous people of the Brazilian Amazon

Xipaya
Xipaya, Xipai, Shipaya

Total population
- 241 (as of 2020)

Regions with significant populations
- Brazil (Pará, specifically Iriri and Curuá river basins, Xingu region)

Languages
- Xipaya (Tupi language family), Portuguese

Religion
- Traditional animism, Catholicism

Related ethnic groups
- Kuruaya, Juruna, Mebengokre (Kayapó), Arara

The Xipaya (also Xipai or Shipaya) are an Indigenous people of the Brazilian Amazon, whose traditional territory lies in the Iriri and Curuá river basins in the state of Pará. Historically skilled navigators and canoe builders, the Xipaya have endured centuries of displacement, violence, and forced labor, yet have maintained a distinct cultural identity and continue to reclaim and defend their ancestral lands.

== History ==
The Xipaya are first mentioned in 17th-century accounts, living on the headwaters of the Xingu River. Their expertise in building and navigating flat-bottomed canoes (ubás) allowed them to travel extensively across the region. Colonial incursions by the Dutch, Irish, British, and later Portuguese led to the foundation of trading posts and plantations along the Xingu, resulting in violent conflicts and forced relocations. In 1750, Jesuit priest Roque Hunderfund established the Tavaquara Mission near present-day Altamira, forcibly resettling Xipaya and neighboring groups such as the Kuruaya, Juruna, and Arara.

Throughout the 19th and early 20th centuries, the Xipaya were further displaced by the rubber boom, incursions by the Mebengokre (Kayapó), Munduruku, and Carajá, and the arrival of rubber tappers who exploited Indigenous labor. Disease, violence, and assimilation policies reduced their numbers drastically. By 1920, only about 30 Xipaya individuals remained, scattered and intermarried with other groups.

Despite these challenges, the Xipaya began a process of reunification in the 1970s, rebuilding villages on the Iriri River and reclaiming territory under the leadership of families such as that of Tereza Xipaya de Carvalho.

== Territory and society ==
Today, the Xipaya inhabit recognized Indigenous territories in the Xingu region, particularly along the Iriri River. Their villages, such as Tukamã and Kaarimã, are centers of cultural revival and community life.

Xipaya society is organized around extended families, with a strong emphasis on collective decision-making, traditional leadership, and the role of women in cultural transmission and resistance. The Xipaya language, part of the Jê family, is spoken by elders, though Portuguese is now widely used.

== Culture and livelihood ==
The Xipaya practice swidden (slash-and-burn) agriculture, cultivating cassava, yams, and fruit trees such as cupuaçu, mango, and papaya. They raise chickens and ducks, fish year-round in the Iriri River, and hunt game such as deer, peccary, and river turtles. Craftwork, including basketry and pottery, remains important for subsistence and cultural identity.

Traditional festivals, such as the December hunting festival and the Saint Sebastian Festival, bring together Xipaya and neighboring riverine peoples (beiradeiros) for communal celebration, food, and football matches.

== Contemporary issues ==
The Xipaya have faced ongoing threats from land grabbers, illegal logging, mining, and large infrastructure projects such as the Belo Monte Dam. In recent years, Xipaya leaders - most notably Juma Xipaia, the first female chief of the Middle Xingu - have gained international recognition for their defense of Indigenous rights and the Amazon rainforest.

Despite assimilation pressures and historical trauma, the Xipaya continue to revitalize their language, traditions, and governance, asserting their autonomy and stewardship of their territory.

== See also ==
- Yanuni, 2025 documentary film
