= 2013 Academy Awards =

2013 Academy Awards may refer to:

- 85th Academy Awards, the Academy Awards ceremony which took place in 2013
- 86th Academy Awards, the Academy Awards ceremony which took place in 2014 honoring the best in film for 2013
