= Natchez (film) =

2025 American documentary film

- Film poster
- Directed by: Suzannah Herbert
- Produced by: Suzannah Herbert; Darcy McKinnon
- Cinematography: Noah Collier
- Edited by: Pablo Proenza
- Music by: James Newberry
- Production companies: ITVS; Gusto Moving Pictures
- Distributed by: Oscilloscope
- Release dates: June 9, 2025 (Tribeca); January 30, 2026
- Running time: 86 minutes
- Country: United States
- Language: English
- Box office: $204,945

Natchez is a 2025 American documentary film, directed and produced by Suzannah Herbert. It explores Natchez, Mississippi, which relies on antebellum tourism to survive, reckoning with the past, an uncertain future, and what it owes to descendants of slavery.

It had its world premiere at Tribeca Festival on June 9, 2025, where it won Best Documentary Feature. It was released on January 30, 2026, by Oscilloscope.

== Premise ==
Explores Natchez, Mississippi, which relies on antebellum tourism to survive, reckoning with the past, an uncertain future, and what it owes to descendants of slavery.

== Production ==
The film received support from ITVS, Catapult Film Fund, Rooftop Films, JustFilms/Ford Foundation, Film Independent, and deNovo Initiative, Sam Pollard and Jacqueline Glover are among the executive producers.

== Release ==
It had its world premiere at Tribeca Festival on June 9, 2025, where it won Best Documentary Feature. It also screened at DC/DOX Film Festival on June 13, 2025, In August 2025, Oscilloscope acquired distribution rights to the film. It was released on January 30, 2026. It was broadcast on PBS as part of Independent Lens on May 11, 2026.

== Reception ==
On Rotten Tomatoes, it has a 97% approval rating based on reviews from 35 critics.
