= H. Scott Salinas =

American musician

H. Scott Salinas is an American film score composer and musician.

== Work and credits ==
=== Feature films ===
- Elevation (2024)

Original Score

- The Banker (2020)

Original Score

- Zipper (2015)

Original Score

- No Ordinary Hero: The SuperDeafy Movie (2013)

Original Score

- Strictly Sexual (2008, DKZ Films)

Original Score

- Just Friends (2006, New Line Cinema)

Original Song, “Jamie Smiles”

- Edison (2005, Millennium Films)

Original Score (Co-Composer)
Toronto Film Festival Selection 2005

- Pool Hall Prophets (2005, Seven Arts Pictures)

Original Song, “Venus”
Toronto Film Festival Selection 2005

- 51 Birch Street (2005, Copacetic Pictures / HBO Documentary)

Original Score
Toronto Film Festival Selection 2005

- The Conventioneers (2005, Hyphenate Films / Cinema Libre Studio)

Original Score (Co-Composer)
Tribeca Film Festival Selection 2005

- Yesterday's Dreams (2005, Living the Dream Productions / Pisces Productions)

Original Score

- The Red Lily (1924)

Original Modern Score for Turner Classic Movies, 2005

- Dark Warrior (2005, Film Shack / Universal Home Video)

Additional Music

- Raise Your Voice (2004, FilmEngine / New Line Cinema)

Additional Score

- The Squaw Man (1913)

Original Modern Score for Turner Classic Movies, 2004

- Latin Dragon (2004, Pacific Entertainment Group / Universal Home Video)

Original Score

- Duplex (2003, Miramax Films)

Source Cues

- The Divine Emerald (2003, Nubian Productions Corporation)

Original Score
New York Independent Film Festival Selection 2004

- Laugh, Clown, Laugh (1928)

Original Modern Score For Turner Classic Movies, 2002
Commissioned as Grand Prize Winner of 2002 TCM Young Film Composers Competition

=== Documentary films ===
- Yanuni (2025)

=== Television ===
- I Hate My Job

2004, RDF Media / Spike TV
Main Title Song

- Johnson County War

2001, Larry Levinson Productions / Hallmark Entertainment
Assistant to Composer

- Evolution

2001, Clear Blue Sky Productions / PBS
Additional Orchestration

=== Video games ===
- The Matrix: Path of Neo

2005, Atari / Shiny Entertainment
Additional Music

=== Advertisements ===
Cisco • Linksys • Toyota • Hyundai • Mattel • Coca-Cola • Kool Aid • History Channel • New York • Olympics 2012 • Nationwide • Special Olympics • Clorox • ID Channel, "Murder in the Heartland" Theme

=== Honors and awards ===
- Winner, AICP Award Best Commercial Music Arrangement “Buglers Dream” (2005)
- Composer Select, Exclusive Summer Program, ASCAP Film Scoring Workshop (2003)
- Grand Prize Winner, Turner Classic Movies (TCM) Young Film Composers Competition (2002)
- Recipient, Georges Delerue Scholarship, Berklee College of Music (2000)
- Composer Select, Atelier with Toni Morrison and Yo-Yo Ma, Princeton University (1996)
