= Richard Ladkani =

Austrian director and cinematographer

- Born: July 21, 1973 (age 53); Austria
- Occupations: Director; Cinematographer
- Organization: Malaika Pictures
- Notable work: The Devil's Miner; The Ivory Game; Sea of Shadows
- Spouse: Anita Ladkani
- Children: Liah Felicia; Maya Malaika

Richard Ladkani (born July 21, 1973) is an independent Austrian director and cinematographer known for documentary films such as The Ivory Game and Sea of Shadows. Ladkani has received the Audience Award at the Sundance Film Festival, the Cinema for Peace Award (Berlin), the FIPRESCI Award and was nominated for the DGA Awards, Cinema Eye Honors, an Emmy, and the IDA Awards. The Ivory Game, Jane's Journey and Yanuni were all shortlisted for an Academy Award. Since 2020, he's been a member of the Academy of Motion Picture Arts and Sciences (Oscars) Documentary Branch.

In 2015, Richard Ladkani and his wife Anita founded the film production company Malaika Pictures.

== Early life ==
Richard Ladkani was born in Beirut, Lebanon in July 1973 and grew up in Baden near Vienna. At the age of 18, Ladkani completed an apprenticeship as a photographer in Paris. Subsequently, he spent several years travelling through South America and Asia as a freelance photojournalist. He presented his travels as multivision slide shows. In 1996, he attended film school at the Maine Media Workshops in Rockport, Maine, United States and soon after moved to New York City to start a career in film.

== Career ==
Ladkani film Escape over the Himalayas (in German: Flucht über den Himalaya), which he shot as cinematographer and co-directed with Maria Blumencron, was produced by Tellux Film on behalf of ZDF, one of Germany’s major public television broadcasters. The film was nominated for Best Documentary at the German TV Awards and won the Axel-Springer-Preis for young journalists. Since then, Ladkani has worked as both director and cinematographer on numerous documentaries including My Vietnam, The Devil's Miner, Vatican – The Hidden World, Gas Monopoly and Killerflu amongst others.

As cinematographer on Jane's Journey, he accompanied the world's foremost expert on chimpanzees, Jane Goodall, on her travels around the globe. During the year-long production, Goodall encouraged Ladkani to focus his future films on environmental and social issues. Ladkani later created eco-thrillers such as The Ivory Game, Sea of Shadows and the Disney+ series Arctic Ascent with Alex Honnold. All films related to the extinction of species, the destruction of ecosystems or climate change.

Jane Goodall supported both The Ivory Game and Sea of Shadows as an honorary ambassador, lending her voice to the promotion of the documentaries.

in 2015, Ladkani and his wife Anita founded Malaika Pictures, named after their firstborn daughter, Maya Malaika Ladkani. In 2017, the company optioned the screen rights to the bestselling book City of Thorns by Ben Rawlence. The Ivory Game, Sea of Shadows and Arctic Ascent with Alex Honnold were all produced in association with Malaika Pictures.

In 2020, Richard Ladkani became a member of the Academy of Motion Picture Arts and Sciences Documentary Branch, which awards the Oscars every year.

=== Escape over the Himalayas (2001) ===
Escape over the Himalayas, co-directed by Richard Ladkani and Maria Blumencron, documents the escape of six Tibetan children over the snow passes of the Himalayas to Dharamsala in northern India, where the four girls and two boys find shelter in a Tibetian SOS Children's Village and are welcomed by the Dalai Lama. The documentary was broadcast on ZDF and won fifteen international awards, such as the Axel Springer Award for young journalists for best documentary 2001.

=== The Devil's Miner (2005) ===
The Devil's Miner is a 2005 documentary directed by Richard Ladkani and Kief Davidson. The film focuses on Basilio Vargas, a fourteen-year-old Bolivian boy who works in the silver mines near the city of Potosí with his twelve-year-old brother Bernardino. The film illustrates the daily life of the miners, their community, beliefs and superstitions, as well as the inhumane working conditions in the mines.

The Devil's Miner was awarded the International Film Critics Prize FIPRESCI at the Hot Docs Festival in Toronto, was nominated for the European Film Award and received and honorable mention at the German Camera Award.

=== A Powerful Noise (2007) ===
This documentary directed by Tom Cappello and shot by Richard Ladkani and Nick Higgins follows three women from Bosnia and Herzegovina, Mali and Vietnam who fight against ignorance, poverty, oppression, and ethnic strife. Hanh from Vietnam founded a support group for people living with HIV; Madame Urbain from Mali advocates for the education of young women in her rural hometown; and Ms Markovic from Bosnia and Herzegovina presents her plan for an agricultural cooperative to create economic opportunities for Bosnian and Serbian women. The documentary was shown at the Tribeca Film Festival in 2008.

=== Killerflu 2008 ===
The film Killerflu 2008, written and co-directed by Bärbel Jacks and Richard Ladkani, was shot as a fictional documentary flashback from 2010 on the course of an influenza pandemic. The H5N1 avian flu virus mutates into a dangerous pathogen as it spreads around the globe. The film is less concerned with the victims than the side effects of the catastrophe. There are demonstrations in front of hospitals, hostage-taking in medicine depots and looting of pharmacies. Politicians enrich themselves by selling drugs that reduce the risk of infection until a vaccine is developed. Some scenes were filmed with mobile phone cameras, others with helmet, surveillance, and thermal imaging cameras.

=== The Most Secret Place on Earth (2008) ===
The Most Secret Place on Earth is a 2007 documentary directed by Marc Eberle and shot by Richard Ladkani. The film focuses on the Secret War in Laos, which took place at the same time as the Vietnam War, and is considered the biggest war crime of the Vietnam War era by critics. With partially previously unpublished CIA archive material, Marc Eberle tells the story of this war, which in many ways became the precursor for today's American warfare. Contemporary witnesses such as former officers and pilots of the CIA and the Hmong army, intelligence experts and journalists tell of the consequences of this war. For this film, Eberle and Ladkani were the first Western journalists since 1975 to be able to visit Long Tieng, where the CIA built its headquarters in 1962.

The documentary was shown at several Film Festivals, such as the Dok Leipzig, Nordic Film Days and One World Film Festival and premiered in German movie theaters in May 2009.

=== Vatican – The Hidden World (2010) ===
Vatican – The Hidden world is a documentary written and directed by Richard Ladkani. The film educates about the Vatican through its employees, including the Pope's personal photographer Francesco Sforza, his bodyguard, the journalist Gudrun Seiler and the altar boy Valentino Dumitrana. Dumitrana realized after two years that he did not want to become a priest, but instead has been granted the wish to be allowed to serve the Pope himself one day. Ladkani received a permit to film the Necropolis underneath St. Peter's Basilica. He was able to fly across the Vatican for aerial photography and fly a drone inside the Sistine Chapel.

The film was broadcast on January 6, 2011 on the German channel ARD and soon after on National Geographic and France 2.

=== Jane's Journey (2010) ===
Jane's Journey is a biographical documentary directed by Lorenz Knauer. Knauer decided on Ladkani as a cinematographer after seeing his work on the documentary The Devil's Miner. Ladkani initially declined because he was due to become a father and the filming was spread over one year and included 100 days of travel, but his wife Anita Ladkani persuaded him to undertake the project. The documentary follows the primatologist Jane Goodall, who conducted ground-breaking research on chimpanzees in Africa and is still active as a conservationist in 2023. The film chronicles Goodall's field research and explores the challenges she faces as a woman in the scientific world, documenting her ongoing efforts in environmental protection around the globe.

The film was awarded with the Cinema for Peace Award in Berlin and was shortlisted for the 2012 Academy Awards.

=== Gas Monopoly (2011) ===
Gas Monopoly, a reference to the board game Monopoly, is a documentary directed by Richard Ladkani. Following the 2009 Russian-Ukrainian gas crisis, the film follows journalist Martin Leidenfrost exploring critical questions such as how to source the urgently needed natural gas and identifying possible suppliers. Top managers, ministers, and lobbyists in this billion-dollar business are introduced, as well as the development and construction of fields, terminals, and pipelines. The stories told in the documentary take place in Azerbaijan, Turkey, Qatar, Russia, and in Brussels.

The film was produced in Austria in 2011.

=== The Ivory Game (2016) ===
The Ivory Game is a feature documentary exposing the criminal networks behind the poaching of African elephants, related to the ivory trade in China and Hong Kong. The film was co-produced by Terra Mater Film Studios and Vulcan Productions, in association with Malaika Pictures and Leonardo DiCaprio's production company Appian Way.

Directors Richard Ladkani, Kief Davidson and their team filmed for 16 months to uncover the global network of the ivory trade. In the process, the team was exposed to mortal danger multiple times while researching and filming on location. Filming took place in several African and Asian countries.

The Ivory Game won three awards at the International Nature Film Festival Green Screen, as well as the Golden Panda and the Theatrical Award at the 2016 Wildscreen festival. Furthermore, the film was honored as Best International Feature Documentary at the Beijing International Film Festival. The film helped push the Chinese government to ban the legal trade of ivory as of January 1, 2018.

The Ivory Game premiered at Telluride Film Festival and Toronto Film Festival and launched on Netflix on November 4, 2016.

=== Sea of Shadows (2019) ===
Sea of Shadows is a 2019 documentary film that depicts the destructive impact of humans on the marine ecosystem of the Sea of Cortez in the Gulf of California, highlighting the links between wildlife crime, global security and economic instability.

Directed by Richard Ladkani and executive-produced by Leonardo DiCaprio, Sea of Shadows is a Terra Mater production in association with Malaika Pictures and Appian Way. Co-directors and associate producers are Sean Bogle and Matthew Podolsky. Shot over several months in 2018, the film is set in the Gulf of California on the Mexican coast, where illegal fishermen use giant gillnets and criminal methods to hunt the rare totoaba fish, whose swim bladder has a huge market value in China. Gillnet fishing also threatens the critically endangered and similarly sized vaquita marina, the smallest cetacean on earth. In August 2023, the World Whaling Commission issued the first ever extinction alert on the vaquita.

Ladkani follows investigative journalists, environmental activists, undercover intelligence agents and marine biologists in their fight to save a species whose disappearance is a metaphor for man's overexploitation of nature.

The film won the Audience Award for world cinema documentary at the Sundance Film Festival in 2019 and was released by National Geographic Documentary Films on July 12, 2019.

== Filmography ==
Year	Title	Director	Cinematographer	Notes
2000	Escape over the Himalayas	Yes	Yes	Documentary short
2002	Monasteries of the Danube Rivers	No	Yes	Television series
2004	My Vietnam	Yes	Yes	Documentary film
2004	Die heilige Lanze – Schicksalsspeer der Mächtigen	No	Yes	Documentary film
2005	The Devil's Miner	Yes	Yes	Documentary film
2005	Under Foreign Command	No	Yes	Documentary short
2005	Beyond Samarkand	No	Yes	Documentary short
2006	Kallawaya – The Andean Healer	Yes	Yes	Documentary short
2007	Killerflu 2008	Yes	Yes	Docu-Drama
2008	A Powerful Noise	No	Yes	Documentary film
2009	Under the Spell of Horses	No	Yes	Television series
2009	The Most Secret Place on Earth	No	Yes	Documentary film
2010	Jane's Journey	No	Yes	Biographical film
2011	Gas Monopoly	Yes	Yes	Documentary film
2011	Race to the South Pole	No	Yes	Documentary film
2011	Vatican – The Hidden World	Yes	Yes	Documentary film
2013	Bavaria!	Yes	Yes	Television series
2016	The Ivory Game	Yes	Yes	Documentary film
2019	Sea of Shadows	Yes	Yes	Documentary film
2022	Arctic Ascent with Alex Honnold	Yes	Yes	Television series
2025	Yanuni − The Amazon is a Woman	Yes	Yes	Documentary film
