= Lightspeed Commerce =

Point-of-sale and e-commerce software provider

Lightspeed Commerce Inc.
- Type: Public
- Traded as: TSX: LSPD; NYSE: LSPD
- Industry: Point of sale; E-commerce
- Founded: 2005; 21 years ago
- Founder: Dax Dasilva
- Headquarters: Montreal, Quebec, Canada
- Products: Lightspeed Retail; Lightspeed eCommerce; Lightspeed OnSite; Lightspeed Restaurant
- Revenue: ▲US$1.227 billion (2026)
- Operating income: ▲US$−144.4 million (2026)
- Net income: ▲US$61.9 million (2026)
- Total assets: ▼US$453.9 million (2026)
- Total equity: ▼US$1.663 billion (2025)
- Number of employees: c. 3,000 (2025)
- Website: www.lightspeedhq.com

Lightspeed Commerce is a point-of-sale and e-commerce software provider based in Montreal, Quebec, Canada. It was founded in 2005 by Dax da Silva, who was its CEO until February 2022. It has offices in Montreal, New York, Ottawa, Toronto, London, Belfast, Amsterdam, Berlin, Geneva, Ghent, Melbourne, Ulyanovsk, Yerevan and Tbilisi. It offers its services to retail, restaurant, and hospitality businesses.

== History ==
Lightspeed was founded by Dax da Silva in 2005, with its headquarters in Montreal, to provide point-of-sale and e-commerce software for retail businesses. In 2014, it expanded its customer base to include the hospitality industry. It has its offices in Montreal, New York, Ottawa, Toronto, London, Paris, Belfast, Amsterdam, Berlin, Geneva, Ghent and Melbourne. The company is backed by iNovia Capital and Accel Partners. Profit has ranked Lightspeed 24th in 2011 and 61st in 2012 on its list of "Canada's 200 fastest growing companies".

Accel Partners led a $30 million investment round in 2012 and from 2012 to 2013, the company observed a 120% growth in annual transactions. It acquired MerchantOS, a point-of-sale software developer in 2013. Lightspeed's customers processed $7.5 billion in 2013. At the time, the company served more than 15,000 store locations.

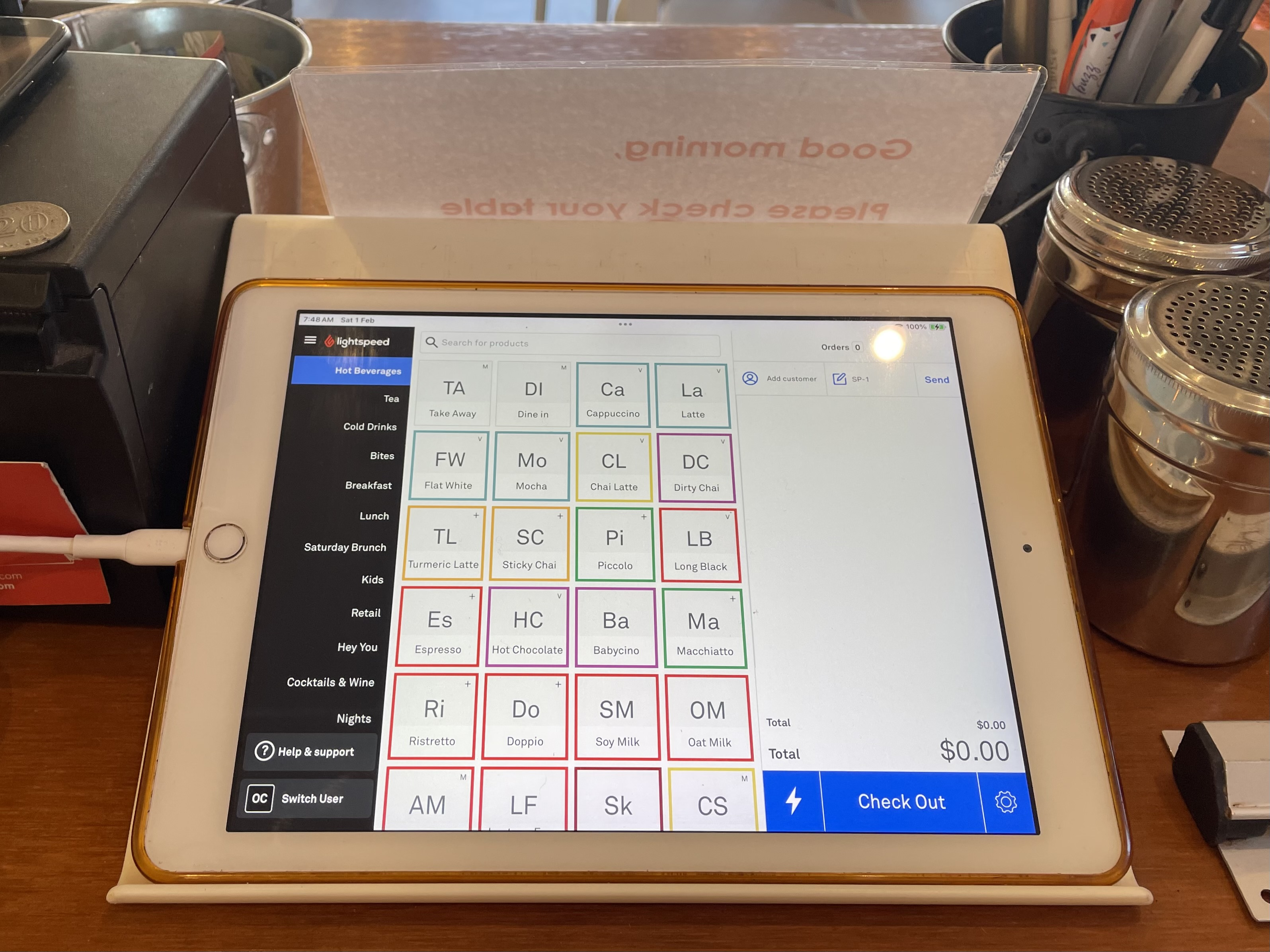
Lightspeed O-Series POS set up on an iPad

On June 18, 2014, the company added Advanced Analytics to Lightspeed Retail's feature roster. In September, Lightspeed closed a $35 million investment round led by iNovia Capital. The same year, it expanded its reach into the restaurant and hospitality industry in 2014 by the Belgian startup POSIOS. Lightspeed was serving 21,000 businesses and its per year transactions increased from $6 billion to $8.2 billion.

The next year, its client base increased to 23,000 businesses in more than 30 countries. In September 2015, Lightspeed closed a $61 million Series C round of funding led by Caisse de dépôt et placement du Québec and Investissement Québec, with participation from earlier investors Accel Partners and iNovia. The next month Lightspeed acquired Amsterdam-based eCommerce software developer SEOShop and announced that it would be expanding its product offering to serve both brick-and-mortar and online retailers. SEOShop's eCommerce platform was rebranded as Lightspeed eCom and further refined to offer complete integration with the company's retail POS software.

In August 2016, Lightspeed suffered a data breach resulting in the exposure of sensitive data worth $12 billion.

In October 2017, Lightspeed POS Inc. raised about C$200 million ($160 million) in a new round of venture-capital funding.

In April 2018, Lightspeed added Patrick Pichette, the former chief financial officer at Google, Paul McFeeters, the former chief financial officer of OpenText to its board of Directors. Lightspeed POS, Inc. Lightspeed unveiled Retail Success Index Tool in October. Later that year, the company announced Lightspeed Loyalty, a platform for customer engagement. The technology was a result of the company's acquisition of Toronto-based ReUp, a digital platform that allows business owners to build a branded loyalty program.

On January 30, 2019, Lightspeed Payments rolled out. In March, the company went public on the Toronto Stock Exchange under the symbol LSPD.

In November 2020, Lightspeed acquired ShopKeep for US$440 million.

On March 12, 2021, New Zealand cloud-based retail software company Vend was bought by Lightspeed for US$350 million.

In fiscal 2022, the company generated revenue of US$548 million with US$3.62 billion in total assets and had about 3,000 employees.

In January 2023, the company laid off close to 300 employees.

In April 2024, the company laid off roughly 10% of its workforce.

In October 2026, the company laid off 250 employees, citing a need to reinvest in customer growth and product innovation.

== Criticism ==
On September 29 2021, short seller Spruce Point Capital Management publicly accused Lightspeed of exaggerating its finances to investors. The stock fell 11% following the firm's report, closing at $126 a share on the Toronto Stock Exchange. The firm alleged that Lightspeed has covered up "massive inflation" of how many customers it has, how much money it makes from them and how much growth potential it has. Spruce Point argued that the company is massively overvalued and is poised to plummet to as low as $22 a share.

Following Spruce Point's report, Lightspeed released a statement saying, "The report contains numerous important inaccuracies and mischaracterizations which Lightspeed believes are misleading and clearly intended to benefit Spruce Point, which itself has disclosed that it stands to profit in the event that the stock price of Lightspeed declines."

Lightspeed Stock proceeded to decline to $22 per share on July 15 2022, and shares trade between $14-18 as of January 2026.
