= Eps1.4 3xpl0its.wmv =

"eps1.4_3xpl0its.wmv"
- Mr. Robot episode
- Episode no.: Season 1 Episode 5
- Directed by: Jim McKay
- Written by: David Iserson
- Cinematography by: Tod Campbell
- Editing by: Franklin Peterson
- Original release date: July 22, 2015
- Running time: 45 minutes

Guest appearances
- Michael Drayer as Francis "Cisco" Shaw; Rick Gonzalez as Isaac Vera; Michele Hicks as Sharon Knowles; Brian Stokes Mitchell as Scott Knowles; Ben Rappaport as Ollie Parker; Frankie Shaw as Shayla Nico; Elliot Villar as Fernando Vera; Ron Cephas Jones as Leslie Romero; Stephanie Corneliussen as Joanna Wellick; Tom Riis Farrell as Bill Harper; Azhar Khan as Sunil "Mobley" Markesh; Sunita Mani as Shama "Trenton" Biswas; Don Sparks as Don Moss

Episode chronology
← Previous "eps1.3 da3m0ns.mp4"	Next → "eps1.5 br4ve-trave1er.asf"

"eps1.4_3xpl0its.wmv" is the fifth episode of the American drama thriller television series Mr. Robot. The episode was written by supervising producer David Iserson and directed by Jim McKay. It originally aired on USA Network on July 22, 2015.

The series follows Elliot Alderson, a cybersecurity engineer and hacker with social anxiety disorder, who is recruited by an insurrectionary anarchist known as "Mr. Robot" to join a group of hacktivists called "fsociety". In the episode, Elliot infiltrates Steel Mountain, where he runs into Tyrell.

According to Nielsen Media Research, the episode was seen by an estimated 1.38 million household viewers and gained a 0.5 ratings share among adults aged 18–49. The episode received mostly positive reviews from critics, who praised the performances and subplots.

== Plot ==
In prison, Fernando Vera (Elliot Villar) is visited by his attorney and brother, with both informing him that there is enough evidence to incarcerate him for years. Vera is not worried about the threat, stating that he knows what to do.

With fsociety working from outside, Elliot (Rami Malek) enters Steel Mountain. He takes on a fake identity, which is verified when Mobley (Azhar Khan) creates a fake Wikipedia article on him. Using "human exploits", he makes his way through the facility by manipulating the staff. However, the plan is put in jeopardy when he runs into Tyrell (Martin Wallström), so Elliot claims that he is visiting to check on Allsafe's behalf. He invites him to eat at a dining hall, where he reveals he knows Elliot framed Colby. To his surprise, Tyrell is not going to disclose it, telling him to take care of himself. With Tyrell out of the picture, Elliot connects the Raspberry Pi and leaves.

Angela (Portia Doubleday) moves out and breaks up with Ollie (Ben Rappaport), informing him that she placed the CD in his Allsafe cubicle. She moves in with her father, Don (Don Sparks), who allows her to stay until she can finds a new home. She later finds that he is indebted to E Corp due to her mother's medical bills. Darlene (Carly Chaikin) meets with Cisco (Michael Drayer), angry that the Dark Army pulled out from their plan. Cisco states that it is not possible to change their mind, also informing her they prevented her from contacting them. That night, Tyrell and Joanna (Stephanie Corneliussen) dine with Scott Knowles (Brian Stokes Mitchell) and his wife Sharon (Michele Hicks). While Sharon is at the bathroom, Tyrell enters. She allows him to see her lower part of her body, and Tyrell thanks her as he leaves.

Elliot, Mr. Robot, Mobley and Romero (Ron Cephas Jones) return to the hideout, where they are informed by Darlene about the Dark Army pulling out. She wants to do the commands by herself, but Mr. Robot feels the process won't be complete if the Dark Army cannot provide them help with the back-ups. Elliot comforts Darlene and invites her to stay at his apartment. They arrive at the building, but Shayla (Frankie Shaw) is nowhere to be found and her phone at the ground. The phone rings and Elliot answers, with Vera calling from the other end, revealing he is involved in her disappearance.

== Production ==
=== Development ===
In July 2015, USA Network announced that the fifth episode of the season would be titled "eps1.4_3xpl0its.wmv". The episode was written by supervising producer David Iserson and directed by Jim McKay. This was Iserson's first writing credit, and McKay's second directing credit.

== Reception ==
=== Viewers ===
In its original American broadcast, "eps1.4_3xpl0its.wmv" was seen by an estimated 1.38 million household viewers with a 0.5 in the 18-49 demographics. This means that 0.5 percent of all households with televisions watched the episode. This was a 8% increase in viewership from the previous episode, which was watched by an estimated 1.27 million household viewers with a 0.4 in the 18-49 demographics.

=== Critical reviews ===
"eps1.4_3xpl0its.wmv" received mostly positive reviews from critics. The review aggregator website Rotten Tomatoes reported an 100% approval rating for the episode, based on 7 reviews.

Amy Ratcliffe of IGN gave the episode a "good" 7.8 out of 10 and wrote in her verdict, "In the episode, Elliot references how meaningful change takes place slowly over time, and the plot seems to be taking that to heart. There were tense moments while Elliot dealt with the hurdles he encountered at Steel Mountain, but overall, FSociety's biggest move yet was borderline dull. We took a step forward and a step back simultaneously."

Alex McLevy of The A.V. Club gave the episode a "B+" grade and wrote, "The question of how we view ourselves vis-a-vis other people drives 'eps1.43xpl0its.wmv,' as our characters all try, in one way or another, to articulate what separates them from everybody else."

Matthew Giles of Vulture gave the episode a perfect 5 star rating out of 5 and wrote, "Even though episode five is titled 'Exploits,' a nod to the caper Elliot and FSociety hope to pull off at Steel Mountain, the title's secondary meaning revolves around exploiting those weaknesses to break down a person, akin to a hacker accessing a system or network and then exerting total dominance." Samantha Sofka of Nerdist wrote, "It's hard to believe, but we've already reached the mid-point of Mr. Robot's first season, and to be honest, we're still not sure what’s actually going on (in a good way)."

Frances Roberts of Den of Geek wrote, "It's satisfying to see a series with this strong a handle on building tension, perspective-play, cliff-hangers and other thriller staples also engage with complicated thematic ideas." Caralynn Lippo of TV Fanatic a 4.65 star rating out of 5 and wrote, "The episode, while not exactly as thrilling as last week's hallucinationpalooza, had some fantastic character moments and great exchanges of dialogue."
