= Eps1.1 ones-and-zer0es.mpeg =

"eps1.1_ones-and-zer0es.mpeg"
- Mr. Robot episode
- Elliot talks to Mr. Robot about his father's death.
- Episode no.: Season 1 Episode 2
- Directed by: Sam Esmail
- Written by: Sam Esmail
- Cinematography by: Tod Campbell
- Editing by: Franklin Peterson
- Original release date: July 1, 2015
- Running time: 48 minutes

Guest appearances
- Gloria Reuben as Dr. Krista Gordon; Michel Gill as Gideon Goddard; Ben Rappaport as Ollie Parker; Frankie Shaw as Shayla Nico; Elliot Villar as Fernando Vera; Michael Drayer as Francis "Cisco" Shaw; Jeremy Holm as Donald "Mr. Sutherland" Hoffman; Ron Cephas Jones as Leslie Romero; Azhar Khan as Sunil "Mobley" Markesh; Sunita Mani as Shama "Trenton" Biswas; Aaron Takahashi as Lloyd Chong

Episode chronology
← Previous "eps1.0_hellofriend.mov"	Next → "eps1.2 d3bug.mkv"

"eps1.1_ones-and-zer0es.mpeg" is the second episode of the American drama thriller television series Mr. Robot. The episode was written and directed by series creator Sam Esmail. It originally aired on USA Network on July 1, 2015.

The series follows Elliot Alderson, a cybersecurity engineer and hacker with social anxiety disorder, who is recruited by an insurrectionary anarchist known as "Mr. Robot" to join a group of hacktivists called "fsociety". In the episode, Elliot receives an offer from Tyrell, while he is asked by Mr. Robot to be part of his next plan.

According to Nielsen Media Research, the episode was seen by an estimated 1.73 million household viewers and gained a 0.6 ratings share among adults aged 18–49. The episode received positive reviews from critics, who praised the performances and character development, although some criticized the pacing.

== Plot ==
Due to Colby's arrest, Tyrell (Martin Wallström) is now E Corp's interim CTO. He offers Elliot (Rami Malek) a position as the company's head of cyber security. Despite the promise of becoming a millionaire within five years, Elliot declines the offer.

Elliot becomes paranoid, so he asks Shayla (Frankie Shaw) for more morphine. Feeling that Tyrell might be following his moves, he smashes his computer's components. At Allsafe, he is given a pay raise by Gideon (Michel Gill), although he is taken aback when Gideon mentions fsociety. Gideon reveals that fsociety released a video to the public, in which they threaten to release incriminating evidence against E Corp unless Colby, described as their leader, is released.

Elliot then returns to his apartment, discovering Darlene (Carly Chaikin), who was waiting for him. She takes him to fsociety, where Mr. Robot (Christian Slater) states that they will destroy an E Corp offline backup facility called Steel Mountain. He wants Elliot to command a hacking, in which he will activate an adjacent gas plant and cause an explosion. Elliot fears putting innocent people in danger and refuses to get involved, and Mr. Robot tells him to never come back. He then visits Shayla, only to meet her drug supplier, Fernando Vera (Elliot Villar). While Elliot has enough evidence to get him to authorities for trafficking, he cannot bring himself to do so as he supplies Shayla with his drugs. However, he changes his mind after finding that he raped Shayla, and sends the evidence to the police, which leads to Vera's arrest.

While walking on the street, Angela (Portia Doubleday) and her boyfriend Ollie (Ben Rappaport) buy a CD from a bystander. At home, the CD does not work on Ollie's laptop, and Ollie also agrees to a sexual encounter with another girl. Unaware to both Ollie and Angela, the laptop's webcam has been activated. The bystander, Cisco (Michael Drayer), is revealed to be behind the hacking, and reports it to a Chinese website. At the fair, Elliot encounters Mr. Robot once again. Elliot offers to perform the hacking without risking lives, but Mr. Robot demands to know more about his father. Elliot opens up about his father getting fired from E Corp and eventually dying from leukemia. Despite his father asking Elliot not to tell his mother about the diagnosis, he still did it, causing his father to ignore him until his death. Suddenly, Mr. Robot pushes Elliot off a railing onto the rock-strewn beach below, reprimanding him for not keeping the secret.

== Production ==
=== Development ===
In June 2015, USA Network announced that the second episode of the season would be titled "eps1.1_one-and-zer0es.mpeg". The episode was written and directed by series creator Sam Esmail. This was Esmail's second writing credit, and first directing credit.

== Reception ==
=== Viewers ===
In its original American broadcast, "eps1.1_ones-and-zer0es.mpeg" was seen by an estimated 1.73 million household viewers with a 0.6 in the 18-49 demographics. This means that 0.6 percent of all households with televisions watched the episode. This was a slight decrease in viewership from the previous episode, which was watched by an estimated 1.75 million household viewers with a 0.5 in the 18-49 demographics.

With DVR factored in, the episode was seen by an estimated 3.54 million household viewers with a 1.2 in the 18-49 demographics.

=== Critical reviews ===
"eps1.1_ones-and-zer0es.mpeg" received positive reviews from critics. The review aggregator website Rotten Tomatoes reported an 100% approval rating for the episode, based on 6 reviews.

Amy Ratcliffe of IGN gave the episode a "great" 8.3 out of 10 and wrote in her verdict, "The second episode of Mr. Robot lost some of the steam and tension it built up in the pilot and had some uneven pacing, but overall, Elliot's world is still a fascinating place to explore. The human moments like Elliot talking about his father and protecting Shayla especially stood out and showed this series is about more than conspiracies and vigilantism."

Alex McLevy of The A.V. Club gave the episode a "B+" grade and wrote, "If there's a lesson beyond vindictiveness here, it's awfully hard to see at the moment. But 'ones-and-zer0es.mpeg' is full of such impulsive acts. The need to make a choice of one kind or another suffuses this episode, much as Elliot feels the need to make decisions which are pressing hard on his conscience, in every aspect of his life." Vikram Murthi of Vulture gave the episode a 2 star rating out of 5 and wrote, "Mr. Robot follows up its compelling pilot with a disappointingly inert second episode, revealing more flaws within the framework of a promising series. Shapeless, unfocused, and shrill, 'eps1.1_ones-and-zer0es.mpeg' is a wheel-spinner that stalls the action just when it needs revving up. Instead of moving forward, Mr. Robot paces in circles: Though it introduces new characters and narrative strands that will certainly come into play later, it clumsily retreads thematic material from the pilot. For all of showrunner Sam Esmail's cinematic aspirations, this episode feels like clichéd cable TV storytelling at its dullest."

Samantha Sofka of Nerdist wrote, "Sure, it doesn't have the the [sic] wow factor the pilot episode had, but it continues to keep me on my toes, and intrigued about the world Rami Malek's Elliot and Christian Slater's Mr. Robot both inhabit." Caralynn Lippo of TV Fanatic a 4.4 star rating out of 5 and wrote, "Elliot had a lot of tough choices to deal with this week - and was even forced to revisit a particularly upsetting episode from his own devastating past. There were two major themes prominently weaved throughout the episode: serendipity and choices."
