= Eps1.3 da3m0ns.mp4 =

"eps1.3_da3m0ns.mp4"
- Mr. Robot episode
- Episode no.: Season 1 Episode 4
- Directed by: Nisha Ganatra
- Written by: Adam Penn
- Cinematography by: Tod Campbell
- Editing by: Philip Harrison
- Original release date: July 15, 2015
- Running time: 46 minutes

Guest appearances
- Michael Drayer as Francis "Cisco" Shaw; Ben Rappaport as Ollie Parker; Frankie Shaw as Shayla Nico; Ron Cephas Jones as Leslie Romero; Azhar Khan as Sunil "Mobley" Markesh; Sunita Mani as Shama "Trenton" Biswas

Episode chronology
| ← Previous "eps1.2 d3bug.mkv" | Next → "eps1.4 3xpl0its.wmv" |

"eps1.3_da3m0ns.mp4" is the fourth episode of the American drama thriller television series Mr. Robot. The episode was written by Adam Penn and directed by Nisha Ganatra. It originally aired on USA Network on July 15, 2015.

The series follows Elliot Alderson, a cybersecurity engineer and hacker with social anxiety disorder, who is recruited by an insurrectionary anarchist known as "Mr. Robot" to join a group of hacktivists called "fsociety". In the episode, Elliot experiences drug withdrawal, which could jeopardize fsociety's plan.

According to Nielsen Media Research, the episode was seen by an estimated 1.27 million household viewers and gained a 0.4 ratings share among adults aged 18–49. The episode received positive reviews from critics, who praised the performances, character development and hallucination sequences.

== Plot ==
Elliot (Rami Malek) discloses his plan to fsociety. The plan involves hacking into the climate control system by connecting a Raspberry Pi to slowly raise the temperature (bypassing the climate control system) to a point where it will destroy the magnetic tape back-ups. However, the plan requires entering the data center, which is heavily guarded.

Due to the lack of suboxone, Elliot starts experiencing drug withdrawal. This causes hallucination and paranoia. At fsociety, Elliot's plan is questioned by member Romero (Ron Cephas Jones), who feels skeptical about the plan. While fsociety will get involved in the hacking, Darlene (Carly Chaikin) must contact the Chinese hacker Dark Army for help, and Elliot must enter Steel Mountain by himself to properly activate the hardware. Despite the withdrawal worsening, Elliot is still intent in taking part in the plan.

Mr. Robot (Christian Slater), Romero and Mobley (Azhar Khan) take care of Elliot, while Darlene and Trenton (Sunita Mani) stay at the group's hideout and wait for the Dark Army to reply back. When Elliot's condition does not improve, Mr. Robot is forced to take him to a local drug dealer, who injects him with morphine. This causes Elliot to fall into severe hallucinations in many scenarios, questioning his reality. While Ollie (Ben Rappaport) sleeps, Angela (Portia Doubleday) takes the CD and steals his Allsafe ID badge. On her way out, she meets Shayla (Frankie Shaw), who convinces her in taking ecstasy to help her stress. They spend the night at a club, where they share a kiss.

Darlene and Trenton meet with Cisco, representing the Dark Army. It is revealed that Cisco and Darlene are romantically involved. Cisco claims the Dark Army is not interested in helping fsociety, but promises in trying to make them change their mind. At Allsafe, Angela uses Ollie's ID to enter while it is closed. She inserts the CD in Ollie's computer and flees before an employee notices her. Elliot's condition improves and he leaves with Romero, Mobley and Mr. Robot for Steel Mountain.

== Production ==
=== Development ===
In July 2015, USA Network announced that the fourth episode of the season would be titled "eps1.3_da3m0ns.mp4". The episode was written by Adam Penn and directed by Nisha Ganatra. This was Penn's first writing credit, and Ganatra's first directing credit.

== Reception ==
=== Viewers ===
In its original American broadcast, "eps1.3_da3m0ns.mp4" was seen by an estimated 1.27 million household viewers with a 0.4 in the 18-49 demographics. This means that 0.4 percent of all households with televisions watched the episode. This was a 21% decrease in viewership from the previous episode, which was watched by an estimated 1.60 million household viewers with a 0.6 in the 18-49 demographics.

=== Critical reviews ===
"eps1.3_da3m0ns.mp4" received positive reviews from critics. The review aggregator website Rotten Tomatoes reported a 100% approval rating for the episode, based on 7 reviews.

Amy Ratcliffe of IGN gave the episode a "great" 8.1 out of 10 and wrote in her verdict, "Mr. Robot continues to deliver stories that aren't quite like anything else on television. Elliot's addiction has been a constant point of the plot, but this episode explored it in a different way by diving into the very important question of what's real and what's not and how much we can actually trust Elliot's perspective."

Alex McLevy of The A.V. Club gave the episode a "B+" grade and wrote, "we have to gamble that it's something more, as Elliot does. We have to play the odds, and hope there are a few familiar faces when we get to the other side. Because no one can settle for that 'ERROR 404' sign; the people around us, and the hope they offer, is all we have to hold on to."

Matthew Giles of Vulture gave the episode a 4 star rating out of 5 and wrote, "With each passing episode, Elliot seems closer to reaching his emotional and psychological core." Samantha Sofka of Nerdist wrote, "As we travel further and further down the rabbit hole that is USA's Mr. Robot, the line between what's real and what isn't has become increasingly blurry, which isn't altogether a bad thing."

Frances Roberts of Den of Geek wrote, "That got weird, fast. After a playfully misleading opening that promised a generic heist episode, the fourth instalment of Mr Robot morphed into a Lynchian experiment. You think you know what this show is by now? Think again, it said." Caralynn Lippo of TV Fanatic a 4.7 star rating out of 5 and wrote, "Overall, this highly stylized and experimental hour was another fantastic episode in a string of great ones."
