= Eps1.2 d3bug.mkv =

"eps1.2_d3bug.mkv"
- Mr. Robot episode
- Episode no.: Season 1 Episode 3
- Directed by: Jim McKay
- Written by: Sam Esmail
- Cinematography by: Tod Campbell
- Editing by: Sharidan Williams-Sotelo
- Original release date: July 8, 2015
- Running time: 46 minutes

Guest appearances
- Gloria Reuben as Dr. Krista Gordon; Michel Gill as Gideon Goddard; Ben Rappaport as Ollie Parker; Frankie Shaw as Shayla Nico; Michael Drayer as Francis "Cisco" Shaw; Randy Harrison as Harry Davis; Michele Hicks as Sharon Knowles; Michael Cristofer as Phillip Price; Stephanie Corneliussen as Joanna Wellick; Jeremy Holm as Donald "Mr. Sutherland" Hoffman; Vaishnavi Sharma as Magda Alderson; Ron Cephas Jones as Leslie Romero; Azhar Khan as Sunil "Mobley" Markesh; Sunita Mani as Shama "Trenton" Biswas; Aaron Takahashi as Lloyd Chong; Mitchell Winter as Anwar Raziz; Annika Pergament as Herself

Episode chronology
← Previous "eps1.1 ones-and-zer0es.mpeg"	Next → "eps1.3 da3m0ns.mp4"

"eps1.2_d3bug.mkv" is the third episode of the American drama thriller television series Mr. Robot. The episode was written by series creator Sam Esmail and directed by Jim McKay. It originally aired on USA Network on July 8, 2015.

The series follows Elliot Alderson, a cybersecurity engineer and hacker with social anxiety disorder, who is recruited by an insurrectionary anarchist known as "Mr. Robot" to join a group of hacktivists called "fsociety". In the episode, Elliot decides to pursue a more normal life, while Tyrell gets upset when another person is chosen for the CTO position.

According to Nielsen Media Research, the episode was seen by an estimated 1.60 million household viewers and gained a 0.6 ratings share among adults aged 18–49. The episode received positive reviews from critics, who praised the performances, character development and pacing.

== Plot ==
Tyrell (Martin Wallström) prepares for a meeting at E Corp, fully expecting to get the position of CTO. However, E Corp's CEO, Phillip Price (Michael Cristofer), informs him that they have decided to hire another person for the position. An upset Tyrell goes to a street corner, where he pays $300 to a homeless man to brutally beat him and vent his frustration.

After his fall, Elliot (Rami Malek) is at the hospital, where he is visited by Shayla (Frankie Shaw) and Krista (Gloria Reuben). He lies that he was pushed off the ledge by kids, and then hacks the hospital's database to change his drug test and be released. He returns to work at Allsafe, where he is invited by Gideon (Michel Gill) to a dinner party, but he declines. However, Elliot is shocked to find Mr. Robot (Christian Slater) at his cubicle, who takes him to a bar to talk. Mr. Robot apologizes for pushing him off, and surprises Elliot by declaring that as their plan required Elliot's involvement, fsociety will now abandon their plan.

Feeling "free", Elliot decides to lead a more normal life by asking Shayla to be his girlfriend and taking her to Gideon's dinner party. As Elliot displays more social skills, the dinner is interrupted for a news report, in which fsociety has leaked documents linking Colby to covering up the Washington Township toxic waste scandal from 1993. This event is responsible for Elliot's father's death, as well as the death of Angela's mother. At a nightclub, Tyrell seduces Anwar (Mitchell Winter), the new CTO's secretary, by kissing him. They proceed to have sex, and afterwards while Anwar takes a shower, Tyrell secretly installs spyware on his phone. He returns home, where his pregnant wife Joanna (Stephanie Corneliussen) wants him to have BDSM sex with her. She suggests meeting with the new CTO, Scott Knowles, to learn more information.

Ollie (Ben Rappaport) is contacted by Cisco (Michael Drayer), who claims he has evidence of his affairs and will disclose it to Angela (Portia Doubleday) unless he infects Allsafe with the same CD virus. Unwilling to do it, Ollie confesses the blackmail and infidelity to Angela. As the hackers have access to her bank records and information, she initially tells him to infect Allsafe to comply with their demands, but then decides to wait, as they could face losing their jobs if caught. Elliot returns to fsociety, where he starts to tell the other members about his plan.

== Production ==
=== Development ===
In June 2015, USA Network announced that the third episode of the season would be titled "eps1.2_d3bug.mkv". The episode was written by series creator Sam Esmail and directed by Jim McKay. This was Esmail's third writing credit, and McKay's first directing credit.

== Reception ==
=== Viewers ===
In its original American broadcast, "eps1.2_d3bug.mkv" was seen by an estimated 1.60 million household viewers with a 0.6 in the 18-49 demographics. This means that 0.6 percent of all households with televisions watched the episode. This was a 8% decrease in viewership from the previous episode, which was watched by an estimated 1.73 million household viewers with a 0.6 in the 18-49 demographics.

With DVR factored in, the episode was seen by an estimated 3.05 million household viewers with a 1.2 in the 18-49 demographics.

=== Critical reviews ===
"eps1.2_d3bug.mkv" received positive reviews from critics. The review aggregator website Rotten Tomatoes reported a 100% approval rating for the episode, based on 7 reviews.

Amy Ratcliffe of IGN gave the episode a "great" 8.2 out of 10 and wrote in her verdict, "Mr. Robot is a slow burn. After an energetic start, the pieces are falling together more slowly. And it's mostly fine. The story would benefit from a quicker pace, but overall, it's a cerebral series and events and decisions take a minute or two to sink in. We've been on the fence with Elliot and now that he's back with F Society, the drama should rise."

Alex McLevy of The A.V. Club gave the episode a "B" grade and wrote, "Even though it didn't end with an amazing and unexpected twist of the sort that closed out last episode, it feels like Mr. Robot is moving forward. This was definitely a 'setting the table' episode, working through Elliot's emotions and getting us more invested in his life so that, when the time comes for shit to go down, we'll care."

Matthew Giles of Vulture gave the episode a 4 star rating out of 5 and wrote, "The third episode of Mr. Robot, USA Network’s hacker drama with surging ratings, is all about the weaknesses we hide from others. Elliot Alderson, played brilliantly by Rami Malek, calls them 'bugs.'" Samantha Sofka of Nerdist wrote, "Using the information Elliot gave him about his father, Mr. Robot forced the hacker's hand, leading him once again back to FSociety's headquarters at the end of the episode."

Frances Roberts of Den of Geek wrote, "Episode three certainly held the line after Mr Robot's first two strong outings. This one was all about Tyrell, the kind of character who only exists in darkly satirical thrillers, a Swedish Patrick Bateman prepared to connive, seduce and maim his way to the top." Caralynn Lippo of TV Fanatic a 4.75 star rating out of 5 and wrote, "Well, that was unexpected! 'd3bug.mkv' threw more than a few curve-balls our way, revealing much more than we might have expected about certain supporting characters and weaving a few more threads into this already very tangled web."
