= Eps1.0 hellofriend.mov =

"eps1.0_hellofriend.mov"
- Mr. Robot episode
- Elliot meets Mr. Robot on the train, who recruits him to join the hacker group fsociety.
- Episode no.: Season 1 Episode 1
- Directed by: Niels Arden Oplev
- Written by: Sam Esmail
- Cinematography by: Tim Ives
- Editing by: Joe Bini
- Original air date: June 24, 2015
- Running time: 65 minutes

Guest appearances
- Michel Gill as Gideon Goddard; Gloria Reuben as Krista Gordon; Frankie Shaw as Shayla Nico; Bruce Altman as Terry Colby; Ben Rappaport as Ollie Parker; Aaron Takahashi as Lloyd Chong; Ron Cephas Jones as Leslie Romero; Azhar Khan as Sunil "Mobley" Markesh; Sunita Mani as Shama "Trenton" Biswas; Samrat Chakrabarti as Rohit "Ron" Mehta

Episode chronology
← Previous —	Next → "eps1.1 ones-and-zer0es.mpeg"

"eps1.0_hellofriend.mov" is the pilot episode of the American drama-thriller television series Mr. Robot. The pilot was directed by Niels Arden Oplev and written by series creator and showrunner Sam Esmail. The episode aired on June 24, 2015, on the USA Network and was watched by approximately 1.75 million people in the U.S., the highest rating the series has ever received.

The episode was praised for its writing, music, cinematography, and performances, particularly that of Rami Malek, as well as comparisons to David Fincher's Fight Club, a film which Esmail has stated he took inspiration from.

== Plot ==
Elliot Alderson is a socially anxious cybersecurity engineer who works at Allsafe Security in New York City while moonlighting as a computer hacker. Elliot narrates directly to the audience, speaking to an imaginary character in his mind. He believes that he is being followed by men in suits, possibly over his actions the night before. In a flashback, Elliot engineers a child pornographer's arrest by hacking the man's computer and sending its illegal content to the police. On the train ride home, he again sees the men in suits along with a man in glasses who attempts to talk to him. The next day, Elliot reports to work at Allsafe, where he provides computer security for the very corporations he despises. At a therapy session, Elliot narrates how he has hacked his therapist, Krista, and has unsuccessfully attempted to hack her boyfriend, Michael Hansen. Allsafe executive Gideon is preparing to host their largest client, the multi-national conglomerate E Corp (which Elliot refers to as "Evil Corp"). During their tour of the office, Elliot has a strange interaction with E Corp's Senior VP of Technology, Tyrell Wellick.

After work, Elliot snorts morphine to help him cope with his depression and loneliness and afterward takes suboxone in case he goes through withdrawal. His next door neighbor and drug dealer, Shayla, offers him molly, and they then have sex. Later that night, he gets a notification on his phone that Krista has checked in at a local restaurant with Michael. Using a ruse, Elliot manages to get Michael's telephone number. While walking home, Elliot receives a panicked phone call from Angela, his childhood friend, begging him to come back to work. At Allsafe, Elliot finds Angela and his coworker Lloyd attempting to stop a DDoS attack on E Corp's servers. Elliot realizes that they cannot stop the hack locally because of the rootkit that the hackers wrote and placed in the root directory of the server, and together with Gideon he flies to E Corp's server farm to stop the hack in person. While examining the hacked server, Elliot finds a file with a message in it for him. The message simply says, "Leave me here," and after a quick debate with himself, he leaves it on the server, but changes the file so that only he can access it.

On his train ride home from Allsafe, Elliot is once again confronted by the man in glasses, whom he refers to as Mr. Robot due to the logo on his shirt. Mr. Robot tells Elliot to follow him off the train, but only if he didn't delete the file from E Corp's server. They head to an abandoned arcade in Coney Island, where Mr. Robot explains that he and a small group of hackers are the ones who attacked E Corp's server. Saving their file instead of deleting it was a test, which Elliot has passed. Mr. Robot welcomes Elliot into the hackers’ group: "fsociety". Elliot returns home and compiles all the evidence needed to turn fsociety into the FBI. Elliot visits Mr. Robot again to tell him that he will be turning him in. On the Wonder Wheel, Mr. Robot asks Elliot to modify the file to show that E Corp's CTO Terry Colby was behind the hack instead of fsociety. Mr. Robot offers Elliot the chance to take E Corp down completely, and Elliot returns home where he modifies the data file as asked. In a meeting with E Corp, the FBI, and Allsafe the next day, Elliot prepares to give the FBI the evidence against fsociety. However, after Terry Colby insults Angela and has her removed from the meeting, he gives the FBI the falsified info that incriminates Colby.

Nineteen days later, Elliot is anxious for something to happen to Terry Colby or E Corp. To occupy his mind, Elliot turns back to hacking Michael. He discovers that “Michael” is using a fake name and profile, and is actually married to someone else. He confronts and threatens the man, telling him that he must reveal his deception to Krista, or Elliot will dump all his collected evidence on the man's wife. Elliot also demands that the man gives him his dog, which he had been abusing. In his next therapy session, Elliot sees Krista is obviously emotionally distracted and knows that the man broke up with her. Elliot returns to work and attempts to patch his relationship with Angela, who hasn't spoken to him since the meeting with the FBI. They make up, and as they hug, everyone in the office begins to stare. They realize that everyone is staring at the TV monitor behind them, which is showing the news that Terry Colby has been arrested by the FBI. Elliot goes to Times Square to watch the news, but he is confronted by the men in suits. They escort him to E Corp's headquarters and lead him into a room to be confronted by Tyrell Wellick.

== Production ==
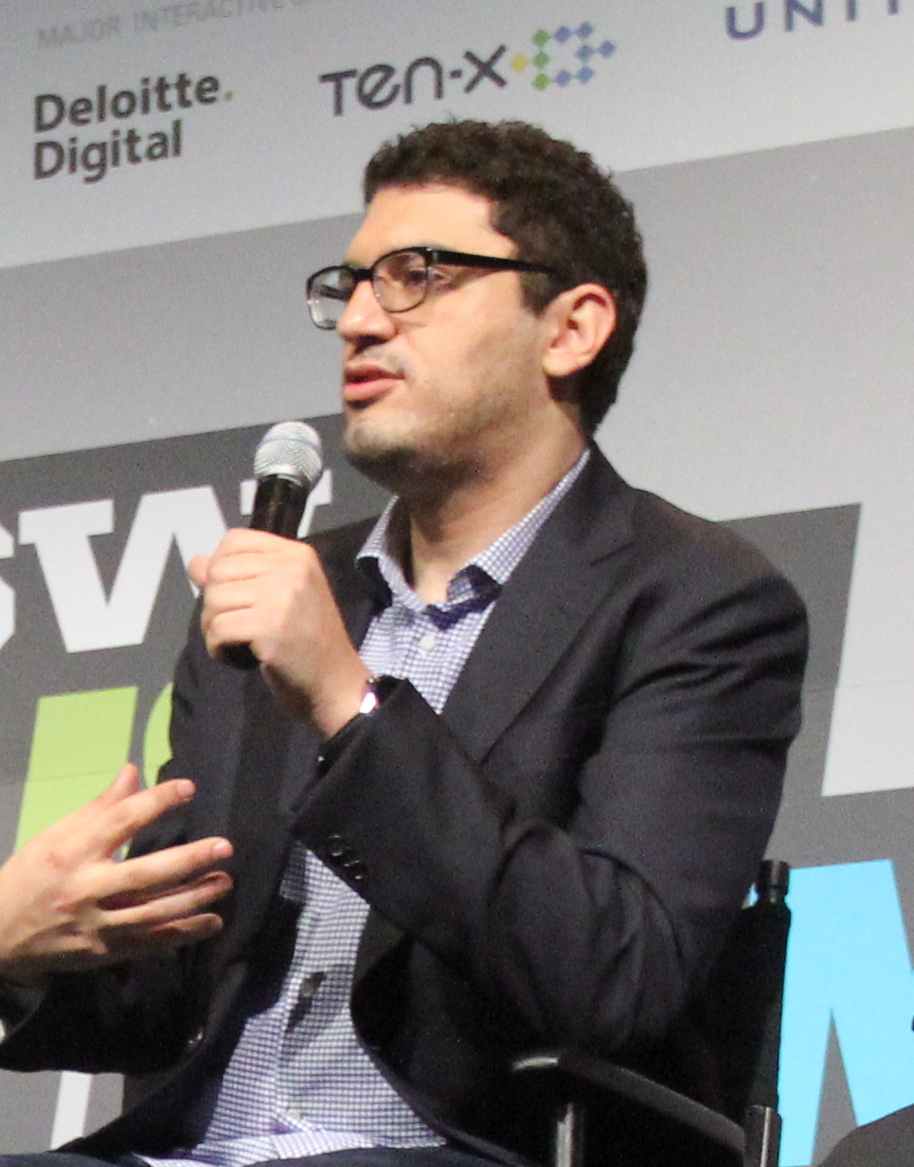
Creator and showrunner Sam Esmail wrote the episode.

=== Writing ===
Sam Esmail originally intended Mr. Robot to be a feature film. However, midway through writing the first act, he found that script had expanded considerably, and that it became a script more suited for a television show. He removed 20 of around 89 pages of the script, and used it as the pilot for the series. Esmail took the script to film and television production company Anonymous Content to see if it could be developed into a television series, which was then picked up by USA Network. The network gave a pilot order to Mr. Robot in July 2014.

=== Casting ===
Casting of the series was an arduous task, as no actor was acclimated to the tone of the series. Casting director Susie Farris (a role she shares with Beth Bowling and Kim Miscia) was surprised by some requirements; she recounted that, "Some of the things [Sam] would say on the phone, I remember just being like, 'Are you kidding? What?' And I think that's what makes the show so good, is because he did have such a vision, and that's not necessarily what happens in episodic television always." According to Esmail, he contemplated rewriting the script before Malek had his audition, saying; "I was auditioning people, and a lot of great actors came in, [but] they were starting to sound very cold to me and so I started second-guessing the script. I felt like I was being lectured by this guy. I felt like the character was being too obnoxious. And then Rami came in and just auditioned with this vulnerability and this warmth that instead of me feeling cold and disconnected from the character, it made me want to reach out to him and hug him. It's something that, once he did the audition, we all knew this was our guy."

=== Filming ===
The pilot was filmed on location in New York. Filming locations included Silvercup Studios and Coney Island, which served as the base of operations for the hacking group fsociety.

== Reception ==
The episode received universal acclaim from critics and audiences. The episode has an approval rating of 100% on Rotten Tomatoes, with an average score of 8.3/10. The episode got a rating of 8.7/10 from Amy Ratcliffe of IGN, who praised Malek, saying "Mr. Robot made a fantastic first impression with its pilot. It's obviously impossible to judge a series based on a single episode, but they've played a strong first hand. Rami Malek is positively brilliant as Elliot, and the character's Robin Hood-esque nature has appeal. The stakes are high and the conspiracies and mysteries are riveting – it's a world I can't wait to see more of."

This episode was nominated for three Primetime Emmy Awards – Outstanding Lead Actor in a Drama Series for Rami Malek, Outstanding Writing for a Drama Series for Sam Esmail, and Outstanding Music Composition for a Series for Mac Quayle, winning for Malek's performance and Quayle's music composition.

In its initial broadcast on USA Network on June 24, 2015, the episode received 1.75 million viewers. The episode also had 2.6 million views prior to its broadcast, as the episode was made available online beginning May 27.
