= 407 Proxy Authentication Required (Mr. Robot) =

- Mr. Robot episode
- In a therapy session with Krista staged by Vera, Elliot remembers that his father sexually molested him.
- Episode no.: Season 4 Episode 7
- Directed by: Sam Esmail
- Written by: Sam Esmail
- Original air date: November 17, 2019
- Running time: 56 minutes

Guest appearances
- Gloria Reuben as Krista Gordon; Young M.A as Peanuts; Jahneer E. Williams as Javi

Episode chronology
← Previous "406 Not Acceptable"	Next → "408 Request Timeout"

"407 Proxy Authentication Required" is the seventh episode of the fourth season of the American thriller drama television series Mr. Robot, and the 39th episode overall. Written and directed by series creator Sam Esmail, it aired on November 17, 2019, on USA Network.

In the episode, Elliot Alderson (Rami Malek) and his therapist Krista Gordon (Gloria Reuben) are held hostage by Fernando Vera (Elliot Villar), who attempts to coerce Elliot into working alongside him by understanding Mr. Robot. This leads to an exploration of the roots of Elliot's dissociative identity disorder.

The episode received universal acclaim, with some critics calling it one of the best episodes of the series. Particular praise was directed at Malek and Villar's performances, as well as Esmail's direction and writing. For the episode, Esmail received a nomination for Best Episodic Drama at the 72nd Writers Guild of America Awards.

== Plot ==
Following the events of the previous episode, Elliot is kidnapped by Fernando Vera and his associates Peanuts and Javi. He is removed from the trunk of a car and then tied to a chair in a room adjacent to Krista, who is also being held hostage.

Vera recounts his life after the events of "eps1.5 br4ve-trave1er.asf", having returned to the Dominican Republic. He describes his journey from street hustling to taking control of the country as well as Haiti in 87 days. On day 88 however, his inscrutable feelings of emptiness are vindicated by a shaman who tells him he must return home. Realizing his desire to return to New York to reconcile with Elliot, he states his plan to take over New York with Elliot as his business partner. Elliot, remembering Shayla's death at Vera's hands, refuses to cooperate unless Krista's safety is guaranteed.

Elliot is brought to Krista and shown that she is safe. Vera reveals his knowledge of Mr. Robot, having extracted it from Krista, and declares his desire to meet him. Mr. Robot takes control after Krista is threatened. He points out flaws in Vera's plan, but offers to help if Krista is let go. Vera protests the suggestion, stating that Krista's captivity guarantees Elliot's cooperation. Elliot offers Vera the money from the Cyprus Bank hack he is planning.

Vera and his crew view the hack's details on a laptop. Seeing they are distracted, Elliot grabs for a gun in his bag. He attempts to shoot Vera and his henchmen, but discovers that the gun had already been unloaded. Angered, Vera threatens to shoot Krista, until Elliot admits that he needs her. Vera, comparing her to the shaman who helped him, decides to change his approach.

Vera forces Krista and Elliot into an impromptu therapy session to discover more about Mr. Robot. Krista protests, saying it will not work without a controlled and private environment, so Vera orders his associates to leave. Krista, still not satisfied, acquiesces after convincing from Elliot. Growing impatient with the discussion of Elliot's mother, Vera demands they discuss the origins of Mr. Robot's existence. Elliot begins to feel that a secret is being kept from him. Frustrated by Mr. Robot and Krista's attempts at diverting the subject matter, he encourages Vera to read from Krista's files. The window event from his childhood is brought up as a moment of significance. Elliot's version of events, that his father accidentally pushed him out the window, is revealed to be incorrect. Discovering instead that he had directed his sister to hide in the closet from their father, as he armed himself with a baseball bat, he learns that he jumped from the window intentionally out of fear. Krista compares his poor memory of the day to his inability to remember moments where Mr. Robot takes control. This makes Elliot realize Mr. Robot took control that day, having existed for longer than he had thought. Krista questions Mr. Robot's purpose and works out that Elliot needed protecting from his father. Upon Krista asking Elliot why he would be afraid of his father and jump from his bedroom window, he breaks down as he remembers that he was sexually abused by his father as a child.

Unable to come to terms with his abuse, Elliot is consoled by Vera. Elliot blames Vera for the revelation, but Vera reveals his own past with sexual abuse, from friends of his mother. Vera says people with their trauma should not struggle alone, and confides his philosophy that people like them become unstoppable. Vera assures Elliot that he isn't alone anymore, but Krista sneaks up behind Vera and stabs him in the back, killing him.

== Production ==
The episode is presented in a five-act structure which critics compared to resembling the structure of a play, emphasized by its reliance on dramatic audio cues and usage of two adjacent sets. It was also broadcast on USA Network commercial-free, and featured crisis resource information for viewers.

The episode title "407 Proxy Authentication Required" comes from the HTTP error code which means that the client or user, must first authenticate or login in with a proxy, before they are allowed to go further and access the requested page.

During rehearsals, actors who were not in the episode were asked to leave the room for the table read of the script.

== Reception ==
The episode received universal acclaim. On Rotten Tomatoes, the episode has a 100% rating based on reviews from 8 critics, with an average score of 9.3/10, On IMDB, the episode received a rating of 9.9/10. Special attention was given to Malek's and Villar's performances, Esmail's direction, and Tod Campbell's cinematography. The New York Times praised the show's courage and "high risk, high reward" storytelling of asking the audience to wrestle with something horrific right at the root of the show. The A.V. Club declared the episode among the series' finest episodes and a potent statement of purpose from Esmail. TVLine named Malek their "Performer of the Week" for his performance in the episode, stating "It's the heaviest moment we've seen so far on the series, a true game-changer, and Malek played every difficult note of it with astounding precision" and that "Malek has added another layer to a truly unforgettable performance." Entertainment Weekly gave it an A− grade, and praised the finale season: "It just keeps packing the punches, both in terms of storytelling and stylistic choices."

Sam Esmail was nominated at the 72nd Writers Guild of America Awards in the category Best Episodic Drama for the episode.

In its initial broadcast on USA Network on November 17, 2019, the episode received 361,000 viewers, which was slightly less than the season average of 376,000 viewers.
