= Eps1.5 br4ve-trave1er.asf =

"eps1.5_br4ve-trave1er.asf"
- Mr. Robot episode
- Elliot opens the trunk of Isacc's car, finding Shayla's dead body.
- Episode no.: Season 1 Episode 6
- Directed by: Deborah Chow
- Written by: Kyle Bradstreet
- Cinematography by: Tod Campbell
- Editing by: Sam Seig; Sharidan Williams-Sotello
- Original release date: July 29, 2015
- Running time: 45 minutes

Guest appearances
- Rick Gonzalez as Isaac Vera; Michele Hicks as Sharon Knowles; Brian Stokes Mitchell as Scott Knowles; Sakina Jaffrey as Antara Nayar; Bruce Altman as Terry Colby; Frankie Shaw as Shayla Nico; Elliot Villar as Fernando Vera; Stephanie Corneliussen as Joanna Wellick; Jas Anderson as DJ

Episode chronology
← Previous "eps1.4 3xpl0its.wmv"	Next → "eps1.6 v1ew-s0urce.flv"

"eps1.5_br4ve-trave1er.asf" is the sixth episode of the American drama thriller television series Mr. Robot. The episode was written by supervising producer Kyle Bradstreet and directed by Deborah Chow. It originally aired on USA Network on July 29, 2015.

The series follows Elliot Alderson, a cybersecurity engineer and hacker with social anxiety disorder, who is recruited by an insurrectionary anarchist known as "Mr. Robot" to join a group of hacktivists called "fsociety". In the episode, Elliot is forced to help Vera escape from prison when Shayla is kidnapped.

According to Nielsen Media Research, the episode was seen by an estimated 1.25 million household viewers and gained a 0.4 ratings share among adults aged 18–49. The episode received critical acclaim, with particular praise for the episode's ending.

== Plot ==
Elliot (Rami Malek) converses with Shayla (Frankie Shaw) at a diner, revealed to be only a partial meeting set up by Vera (Elliot Villar). As Shayla is taken away by Vera's henchmen, he promises to help her get out of it. He is then called by Vera, who demands that Elliot use his resources to get him out of prison that night as he is targeted by inmates, or Shayla dies. Elliot is taken to his apartment by Vera's brother, Isaac (Rick Gonzalez), and DJ (Jas Anderson).

Angela (Portia Doubleday) contacts a lawyer, Antara Nayar (Sakina Jaffrey), who represented her mother in the lawsuit against Washington Township. Angela wants her to re-open the case with new evidence, but Antara explains their only proof would be a witness to the decision taking. She tries to get Colby (Bruce Altman) to help, but he refuses to talk to her.

To help Elliot, Darlene (Carly Chaikin) creates a malware, dropping it on a USB near the prison. The USB is picked up by a security guard, who connects it to the main computer. The computer gets hacked, but the officer plugs it off, preventing Elliot from hacking the system. To access the network, Elliot goes to prison accompanied by Isaac, DJ and Darlene. Elliot talks with Vera, informing him that he will open all cells at the same time to avoid detection, and that Vera will have to run to escape. He also explains that he found enough evidence of his drug operations, and threatens to expose him and his gang to the authorities if they ever target Elliot and Shayla again.

Scott (Brian Stokes Mitchell) tells Tyrell (Martin Wallström) that he is aware that Tyrell wanted the CTO position and is trying to manipulate him, also revealing that Sharon (Michele Hicks) told him about the bathroom incident. He humiliates Tyrell by telling him he will never be CTO, and mocks Tyrell by sarcastically offering to urinate in front of him. At home, a furious Tyrell laments the situation by smashing the kitchen. Joanna (Stephanie Corneliussen) tells him that they need to use Sharon at their advantage, as she clearly desires to be wanted.

Elliot prepares to set off the hack but is stopped short by Isaac. He discovers that Isaac is the person who ordered the hit on Vera's life, which is why Vera wanted to be released that very day. Elliot gives him the option to allow the release, as Isaac won't be able to kill Vera due to his new protection. Isaac reluctantly allows him, and Elliot hacks the system through a guard's police cruiser. That night, Elliot deactivates the cells, and Vera escapes with the rest of the inmates. On Vera's orders, DJ kills Isaac, telling Elliot that he can do whatever he wants with his criminal empire as he is leaving the country. As Vera and DJ leave in a car, Elliot asks about Shayla. Vera hands him Isaac's car keys, saying "Told you you'd get her back, bro. You just didn't realize she was with you the whole time." He opens the car's trunk, and finds Shayla's corpse with her throat slit. Devastated, Elliot cries and flees the scene as police sirens are heard.

== Production ==
=== Development ===
In July 2015, USA Network announced that the sixth episode of the season would be titled "eps1.5_br4ve-trave1er.asf". The episode was written by supervising producer Kyle Bradstreet and directed by Deborah Chow. This was Bradstreet's first writing credit, and Chow's first directing credit.

== Reception ==
=== Viewers ===
In its original American broadcast, "eps1.5_br4ve-trave1er.asf" was seen by an estimated 1.25 million household viewers with a 0.4 in the 18-49 demographics. This means that 0.4 percent of all households with televisions watched the episode. This was a 10% decrease in viewership from the previous episode, which was watched by an estimated 1.38 million household viewers with a 0.5 in the 18-49 demographics.

=== Critical reviews ===
"eps1.5_br4ve-trave1er.asf" received critical acclaim. The review aggregator website Rotten Tomatoes reported an 100% approval rating for the episode, based on 8 reviews.

Amy Ratcliffe of IGN gave the episode a "great" 8.7 out of 10 and wrote in her verdict, "Elliot's focus this week shifted off taking down Evil Corp, but as he let go, Angela picked up the gloves. And as it should be, she's taking a more direct approach. There's definitely the possibility for her to get to Elliot and FSociety's level though. Elliot's world has been turned upside down, and it's a fascinating place to put a character at this point in the season."

Alex McLevy of The A.V. Club gave the episode an "A–" grade and wrote, "The most impressive moment in this episode of Mr. Robot doesn't arrive until the very end. And no, it's not the reveal of Shayla, her lifeless body having been in the trunk of the car this entire time. That's the gut punch, but it's not what makes this episode arguably the best yet. No, it's what comes after that reveal that counts. The part where the camera slowly moves from one side of Elliot to the other, and back again, and the entire time, it just holds. No cuts, no edits, it just... holds. This is what elevates the series from merely a good show into a very good show. It doesn't force the moment, but it also doesn't shy away from it." Samantha Sofka of Nerdist wrote, "The final moments of the episode were gut-wrenching and a complete shock. Elliot has come a long way since the beginning of the season, and I'm curious to see how he copes with losing Shayla."

Kevin P. Sullivan of Entertainment Weekly wrote, "While the writers and directors on Mr. Robot have provided a ton of well-stage suspense this season, I think the series' best contribution to the medium has been providing Malek with a long-overdue platform to show off just how good he is." Matthew Giles of Vulture gave the episode a 4 star rating out of 5 and wrote, "For the initial 50 or so minutes of Mr. Robot's episode six, I thought the show had suffered its first misstep. Shayla's kidnapping plot felt so forced — a way to bring back Vera, one of the show's most compelling characters, into the fold. I didn't understand how creator Sam Esmail would resolve the situation. It's not like Vera was going to apologize and then let Elliot and Shayla resume cordialities on the Lower East Side. [...] So that is why the episode's final minutes felt so shocking. From the moment Vera tosses Elliot the keys to the car's trunk, saying, 'You just didn't realize she was with you the whole time,' to the realizations of both the audience and Elliot that Shayla is dead, the scene is gut-wrenching."

Frances Roberts of Den of Geek wrote, "To take stock past the mid-point of Mr Robot's first season, this stylish show has had many more wins than failures. It can handle tension and surprise with the best of them, but better than that, it's created characters whose actions are hard to predict and put them in situations we didn't see coming. It's a perfect formula for making the viewer lean in and pay attention. Episode seven can't come quickly enough." Caralynn Lippo of TV Fanatic a 4.5 star rating out of 5 and wrote, "There is nothing quite like the feeling of believing your hero to have triumphed over great odds only to find out that it was all for absolutely nothing. That's what happened tonight on the episode – we spent the whole hour following Elliot as he hacked the unhackable, busting Vera out of prison to save Shayla's life. But Shayla was dead anyway the entire time."
