= HQ2 =

HQ2 may refer to:

- HQ^{2}, a musical duo comprising producers/remixers Hex Hector and Mac Quayle
- The Amazon HQ2, a second headquarters for the American company, Amazon
