= Jim McKay (director) =

American film director

- Born: United States
- Occupations: Television director, film producer, screenwriter, film director, television producer
- Years active: 1996–present

Jim McKay is an American film and television director, producer and writer.

He has directed episodes of The Wire, Treme, Better Call Saul, Big Love, Criminal Intent and Mr. Robot as well as writing and directing Everyday People and Angel Rodriguez.

== Career ==
For The Wire McKay directed the fourth episode of the fourth season, "Refugees". Show runner David Simon had seen McKay's HBO films and describes them as "masterful, ordinary-life movies" and thought that McKay would be perfect for the series based on their shared characteristics of accumulating drama in small moments. McKay has worked with several cast members of the show on other projects including Reg E. Cathey and Jamie Hector on Everyday People and Wendell Pierce on Life Support.

== Filmography ==
Film

Year	Title	Director	Writer	Producer
2018	En el séptimo día	Yes	Yes	Yes
2000	Our Song	Yes	Yes	Yes
1996	Girls Town	Yes	Yes	No

TV movies

Year	Title	Director	Writer	Producer
2007	Life Support	No	Yes	No
2005	Angel Rodriguez	Yes	Yes	Yes
2004	Everyday People	Yes	Yes	No

TV series

Year	Title	Episode
2025	Smoke	"Mercy"
2025	Smoke	"Manhood"
2025	Smoke	"Size Matters"
2024	American Rust	"Confessions"
2024	American Rust	"Faster Horses, Younger Women and More Money"
2024	American Rust	"The Golden Goose"
2024	American Rust	"Homecoming"
2022	Black Bird	"WhatsHerName"
2022	Law & Order: Organized Crime	"Nemesis"
2020	Better Call Saul	"Dedicado a Max"
2020	Home Before Dark	"Search Party"
2020	Home Before Dark	"The Future Is Female"
2020-2021	FBI: Most Wanted	"Dysfunction"
2020-2021	FBI: Most Wanted	"Execute"
2020-2021	FBI: Most Wanted	"Rampage"
2020-2021	FBI: Most Wanted	"Hairtrigger"
2019	Evil	"Vatican III"
2019	For The People	"The Boxer"
2019	The Good Fight	"The One Where a Nazi Gets Punched"
2018	Quantico	"Deep Cover"
2018	Better Call Saul	"Coushatta"
2018	Instinct	"Bad Actors"
2018	The Good Fight	"Day 436"
2018	The Good Fight	"Day 415"
2017	Quantico	"Resistance"
2017	The Good Fight	"Self Condemned"
2017	The Good Fight	"Social Media and Its Discontents"
2017	Shades of Blue	"Chaos Is Come Again"
2017	Shades of Blue	"Unpaid Debts"
2016	Power	"Trust Me"
2016	BrainDead	"Goring Oxes: How You Can Survive the War on Government Through Five Easy Steps"
2016	BrainDead	"Playing Politics: Living Life in the Shadow of the Budget Showdown - A Critique"
2015	Power	"Time's Up"
2015	Mr. Robot	"eps1.4_3xpl0its.wmv"
2015	Mr. Robot	"eps1.2_d3bug.mkv"
2015	The Good Wife	"KSR"
2015	The Good Wife	"Taxed"
2015	The Good Wife	"Innocents"
2015	The Good Wife	"Dark Money"
2014	Bosch	"Chapter One: 'Tis the Season"
2014	Rectify	"Mazel Tov"
2014	The Good Wife	"Trust Issues"
2014	The Good Wife	"The Last Call"
2013	The Good Wife	"Red Team, Blue Team"
2013	Rectify	"Plato's Cave"
2013	Betrayal	" ...That Is Not What Ships Are Built For"
2013	Zero Hour	"Sync"
2013	The Americans	"Safe House"
2013	Law & Order: Special Victims Unit	"Deadly Ambition"
2012	Law & Order: Special Victims Unit	"Friending Emily"
2012	Law & Order: Special Victims Unit	"Home Invasions"
2012	Treme	"Saints"
2012	Boss	"Louder Than Words"
2012	Blue Bloods	"Reagan V. Reagan"
2011	Boss	"Slip"
2011	Boss	"Reflex"
2011	The Good Wife	"The Death Zone"
2011	The Good Wife	"Silver Bullet"
2010	Treme	"Meet De Boys on the Battlefront"
2010	Law & Order	"Immortal"
2010	Law & Order	"Four Cops Shot"
2010	The Good Wife	"Bad Girls"
2010	In Treatment	"Jesse: Week Seven"
2010	In Treatment	"Jesse: Week Six"
2010	In Treatment	"Frances: Week Five"
2010	In Treatment	"Jesse: Week Four"
2010	In Treatment	"Adele: Week Three"
2010	In Treatment	"Jesse: Week Two"
2010	In Treatment	"Frances: Week Two"
2009	The Good Wife	"Unprepared"
2009	Law & Order	"Dignity"
2009	Law & Order	"Take-Out"
2009	Law & Order	"Chattel"
2009	Hung	"The Rita Flower or the Indelible Stench"
2009	In Treatment	"April: Week Seven"
2009	In Treatment	"April: Week Five"
2009	In Treatment	"April: Week Four"
2009	Big Love	"Empire"
2008	Law & Order	"Excalibur"
2008	Law & Order	"Quit Claim"
2008	Gossip Girl	"The Ex Files"
2008	New Amsterdam	"Keep the Change"
2008	Breaking Bad	"Cancer Man"
2007	Big Love	"Take Me As I Am"
2007	Big Love	"Dating Game"
2007	Law & Order Criminal Intent	"Flipped"
2006	Law & Order Criminal Intent	"Maltese Cross"
2006	The Wire	"Refugees"
