= Ones and Zeros =

Ones and Zeros may refer to:

- Ones and Zeros (Immaculate Machine album)
- Ones and Zeros (Young Guns album)
- eps1.1_ones-and-zer0es.mpeg, a 2015 episode of Mr. Robot

== See also ==
- Zeros and Ones, a 2021 film
- "Zeroes and Ones", a song by Jesus Jones
- Binary number
