= SMILF =

American comedy television series

- Genre: Comedy drama
- Created by: Frankie Shaw
- Starring: Frankie Shaw; Miguel Gomez; Samara Weaving; Rosie O'Donnell; Raven Goodwin
- Composer: Daniel Hart
- Country of origin: United States
- Original language: English
- No. of seasons: 2
- No. of episodes: 18

Production
- Executive producers: Lee Eisenberg; Gene Stupnitsky; Frankie Shaw; Michael London; Scott King
- Camera setup: Single-camera
- Running time: 30 minutes
- Production companies: Supahsmaht Productions; Quantity Entertainment; Groundswell Productions; ABC Signature; Showtime Networks

Original release
- Network: Showtime
- Release: November 5, 2017 – March 31, 2019

SMILF is an American comedy drama starring, created, written, and directed by Frankie Shaw. It was based on her short film of the same title. The series premiered on Showtime on November 5, 2017. The series' name, SMILF, is a play on the term "MILF", with the "S" standing for "single", or "Southie" (a nickname for South Boston), or both. On November 29, 2017, Showtime renewed the series for a second season.

Rosie O'Donnell co-stars as Tutu, the mother of Shaw's character Bridgette. Roseanne Barr was supposed to take on the role of Tutu, but due to a knee injury and subsequent surgery, she could not do so. Connie Britton has a recurring role as Ally, Bridgette's boss. Miguel Gomez and Samara Weaving are also in the cast, as well as Raven Goodwin, who first appeared in a recurring role but was promoted to a starring role in the second season.

On December 17, 2018, The Hollywood Reporter published an exclusive report that cast and crew members were alleging misconduct on the set, including "inappropriately handled sex scenes", and that co-star Weaving had left the production over breach of contract in the filming of a sex scene. On March 8, 2019, a few days after the fourth episode of season two was broadcast, the series was canceled by ABC Signature, who also suspended a future production deal with Shaw. Showtime played out the full run of season two, with the final episode airing on March 31, 2019.

== Cast ==
=== Main ===
- Frankie Shaw as Bridgette
- Miguel Gomez as Rafi
- Samara Weaving as Nelson Rose
- Rosie O'Donnell as Tutu
- Raven Goodwin as Eliza
- Anna and Alexandra Reimer as Larry

=== Recurring ===
- Connie Britton as Ally
- Blake Clark as Joe
- Mark Webber as Father Eddie
- Bodega Bamz as Carlos

== Episodes ==
Season	Episodes	Originally released	
Season	Episodes	First released	Last released
1	8	November 5, 2017	December 31, 2017
2	10	January 20, 2019	March 31, 2019

=== Season 1 (2017) ===
No. overall	No. in season	Title	Directed by	Written by	Original release date	U.S. viewers (millions)
1	1	"A Box of Dunkies & Two Squirts of Maple Syrup"	Frankie Shaw	Frankie Shaw	October 20, 2017 (online); November 5, 2017 (Showtime)	0.768
Single mother Bridgette Bird finds an old hookup for an opinion on her post-birth vagina. They intend to have sex, but he stops and leaves after discovering her son on the bed. Her baby daddy Rafi starts dating someone hot.
2	2	"1,800 Filet-O-Fishes & One Small Diet Coke"	Leslye Headland	Frankie Shaw & Emily Goldwyn	November 12, 2017	0.547
Left in charge of Ally's house for the day, Bridgette fantasizes about living the life of a wealthy stay-at-home mother; Larry develops a suspicious rash which prompts Nelson to get Larry vaccinated without anti-vaxxer Rafi's knowledge or consent
3	3	"Half a Sheet Cake & a Blue-Raspberry Slushie"	Leslye Headland	Jess Dweck & Frankie Shaw	November 19, 2017	0.476
Bridgette searches for additional income, and runs into multiple unusual situations while doing so.
4	4	"Deep-Dish Pizza & a Shot of Holy Water"	Leslye Headland	Karey Dornetto	November 26, 2017	0.516
Bridgette, Eliza, and Nelson participate in an extreme mud run; Rafi and Tutu baptize Larry without Bridgette's consent.
5	5	"Run, Bridgette, Run or Forty-Eight Burnt Cupcakes & Graveyard Rum"	Amy York Rubin	Zach Strauss	December 3, 2017	0.529
Bridgette feels conflicted on Father's Day as she chooses different paths to forgive Rafi for baptizing Larry. This episode refers to Run Lola Run.
6	6	"Chocolate Pudding & a Cooler of Gatorade"	Amy York Rubin	Sarah L. Jones & Mel Shimkovitz	December 10, 2017	0.575
Having realized her passion for basketball, Bridgette tries out for the WNBA; Rafi comes to a crossroads after a visit with Father Eddie; Tutu reconnects with someone from her past.
7	7	"Family-Sized Popcorn & a Can of Wine"	Frankie Shaw	Scott King	December 17, 2017	0.567
Bridge, Eliza, and Larry spend a day together searching for Bridge's towed car; Tutu has a manic episode.
8	8	"Mark's Lunch & Two Cups of Coffee"	Frankie Shaw	Frankie Shaw	December 31, 2017	0.407
Bridgette matches with a man on Tinder who she believes to be her estranged father; Tutu prepares to go on a cruise; Rafi moves in with Nelson.

=== Season 2 (2019) ===
No. overall	No. in season	Title	Directed by	Written by	Original release date	U.S. viewers (millions)
9	1	"Shit Man, I've Literally Failed"	Frankie Shaw	Scott King	January 4, 2019 (online); January 20, 2019 (Showtime)	0.242
Bridgette's search for her father in Philadelphia leads her to a dead end. After losing her wallet on the plane, Bridgette is stuck at the airport until they find it. Meanwhile, Tutu leaves Larry in the care of a suicidal Joe while she goes shopping. When Brigitte comes to pick Larry up, she discovers Joe drowned in his soup while overdosing on sleeping pills. During the funeral, Brigitte discovers her father's obituary. Brigitte returns to the funeral and says a few words about Joe.
10	2	"Sorry Mary, I'm Losing Faith"	Frankie Shaw	Frankie Shaw & Rachel Leavitt	January 27, 2019	0.203
While getting her tattoo removed, Bridgette makes plans with a tattoo artist. When Bridgette tries to find someone to watch Larry, she finds an unstable Ally who manipulates Bridgette into having dinner with her. During Ally's birthday dinner, Bridgette and Ally talk about her husband's affair. Ally breaks down and fires Bridgette. Meanwhile, Tutu and Jackie clash with Joe's son while moving Joe's things. After he leaves, the two get high and reminisce about Joe. Which culminates in Tutu smashing his car with a golf club. Bridgette blows off her date to go to church. She talks to a statue of the Virgin Mary and steals it.
11	3	"Surrogate Mothers Inspire Loving Families"	Frankie Shaw	Emily Goldwyn & Jess Lamour	February 10, 2019	0.206
The episode deals with the ripple effects of Ally's birthday dinner date with Bridgette and the impact it has on the people around Ally and Bridgette, told in several short segments. Ally's daughter Chloe has a very close bond with Ida, Ally's housekeeper. Chloe comes home from a date feeling rejected, but Ida consoles her when Ally isn't there. Elsie is excited to go to a concert with her sister Mindy later in the evening after Ally gives her old refrigerator to her. With her newly freed-up money, Elsie is able to get her hair done. Unfortunately, Elsie misses out on going when she gets a call from Ally to babysit Larry while Ally and Bridgette go out for Ally's birthday. She ultimately spends the evening with Larry and Mindy, missing the concert. Ally gets a call from her son and has to pick him up from school because he is not feeling well. While trying to bond with him, Ally wants to go into a store, desperately trying to obtain a rare and expensive Birkin bag. Despite Ally not being very kind to her, a very helpful Mindy decides to help Ally get the bag, as they share the same birthday.
12	4	"So Maybe I Look Feminine"	Frankie Shaw	Heather V. Regnier	February 17, 2019	0.196
Larry spends the weekend with Rafi and Nelson invites Bridgette to go to a salon with her. Bridgette procrastinates at home but decides to go. While having her hair done, she meets a bride-to-be and they strike up a friendship. The bride invites Bridgette and Nelson to go to a charity polo match with her and her friends. They go along and Bridgette meets Kevin Bacon, who fingers her in a barn and asks her to go out for a meal with him after the event has finished. Bridgette returns to her friends but the bride is struck in the face by a polo ball. Bridgette pictures herself alone in the field and then finds herself in her apartment, the whole thing having been a daydream.
13	5	"Single Mom in Love Forever"	Cate Shortland	Frankie Shaw	February 24, 2019	0.142
Set in 2014, Bridgette is pregnant and engaged to Rafi. They go for an ultrasound as Bridgette's contractions have started and argue about Rafi having kissed another woman recently and Bridgette's desire for a home birth. Bridgette tries to have sex with Rafi in the car before they go home but he doesn't want to and they talk about their plans to move to New York after the baby is born. They go to the park and see Tutu and Joe there; Bridgette and Tutu argue about a home birth and Bridgette walks home, attempting to steal a signed Larry Bird jersey on the way. Bridgette's contractions intensify throughout the evening and she tells Rafi that she can't marry him just before she gives birth.
14	6	"Should Mothers Incur Loss Financially?"	Cate Shortland	Frankie Shaw & Jessica Moore	March 3, 2019	0.215
Bridgette has a job interview which goes well until they find out she has a child and tell her the job wouldn't suit her. She registers for food stamps but is embarrassed at a supermarket when she can't use them to buy non-food items and shouts at Tutu when she refuses to pay for them for her. Joe's son tells Tutu that he plans to sell Joe's house, which Tutu lives in. Rafi and Nelson get into an argument over their respective jobs but they make up and agree to get married. Bridgette and Tutu make up and agree that in one year, Bridgette will have a good job and Tutu will own a house.
15	7	"Smile More If Lying Fails"	Kerry Washington	Frankie Shaw & Thembi L. Banks & Rochée Jeffrey	March 10, 2019	0.250
Bridgette and Larry get matching cornrows. Rafi and Nelson tell Bridgette that they plan to get married and that she will not be invited to the wedding. Bridgette goes to a party with Eliza and ends up going to see a man she was supposed to go on a date with. They have sex and Bridgette accidentally sends him a text saying how bad it is. She leaves and meets up with Eliza, who helps Bridgette take out her cornrows.
16	8	"Sex Makes It Less Formal"	Cate Shortland	Emily Goldwyn	March 17, 2019	0.185
Rafi and Nelson have sex and he is frustrated that she does not orgasm. He leaves to attend a surprise bachelor party that Bridgette has organised and Nelson is joined by her mother and sister, who have flown in from Australia. Nelson tries on her wedding dress but appears to be getting cold feet, has a panic attack and cuts herself out with scissors. Bridgette and Rafi have fun at the party until she finds a $4,000 engagement ring in his bag and shouts at him for valuing Nelson more than Larry. He storms out but they make up and he invites her to his wedding. Meanwhile, Tutu finds a letter from Joe explaining that he had long planned to kill himself and that he only delayed because he was "selfish" and wanted to spend more time with her. He tells her to live the rest of her life for herself.
17	9	"Single Mom Is Losing Faith"	Zach Strauss	Frankie Shaw & Zach Strauss	March 24, 2019	0.175
Bridgette fantasises that she is a cowgirl in the Old West.
18	10	"Single Mom Is Looking (for) Family"	Cate Shortland	Zach Strauss & Halley Feiffer	March 31, 2019	0.149
Bridgette and Rafi celebrate Larry's birthday and kiss. Nelson tells Bridgette that she is pregnant and that she fears Rafi has relapsed. At Larry's birthday party, Rafi is high on Oxycodone and Bridgette confronts him; he promises to stay clean. Tutu reveals to Bridgette that she has another daughter, who she was forced to give up for adoption by her parents.

== Reception ==
=== Critical response ===
On the review aggregation website Rotten Tomatoes, the first season has an approval rating of 82% based on 38 reviews, with an average rating of 6.42/10. The website's critical consensus reads, "A questionable name and superficially familiar tropes mask SMILF's raw, tender core and surprisingly fresh perspective." Metacritic, assigned a weighted average score of 64 out of 100 based on 20 critics, indicating "generally favorable reviews". The show was included in a list on Refinery 29 of 'The 17 Best TV Shows For Women Of 2017', which said, "If there's one new fall 2017 show you're going to watch, let it be Showtime's SMILF [...] Sadly, television rarely allows women to be so layered."

The second season has a 100% approval rating on Rotten Tomatoes, based on 9 reviews. On Metacritic, it has a score of 73 out of 100, based on 5 critics.

=== Awards and nominations ===
Year	Award	Category	Recipient(s)	Result
2018	75th Golden Globe Awards	Best Actress – Television Series Musical or Comedy	Frankie Shaw	Nominated
2018	75th Golden Globe Awards	Best Television Series – Musical or Comedy	SMILF	Nominated
