= Mac Quayle =

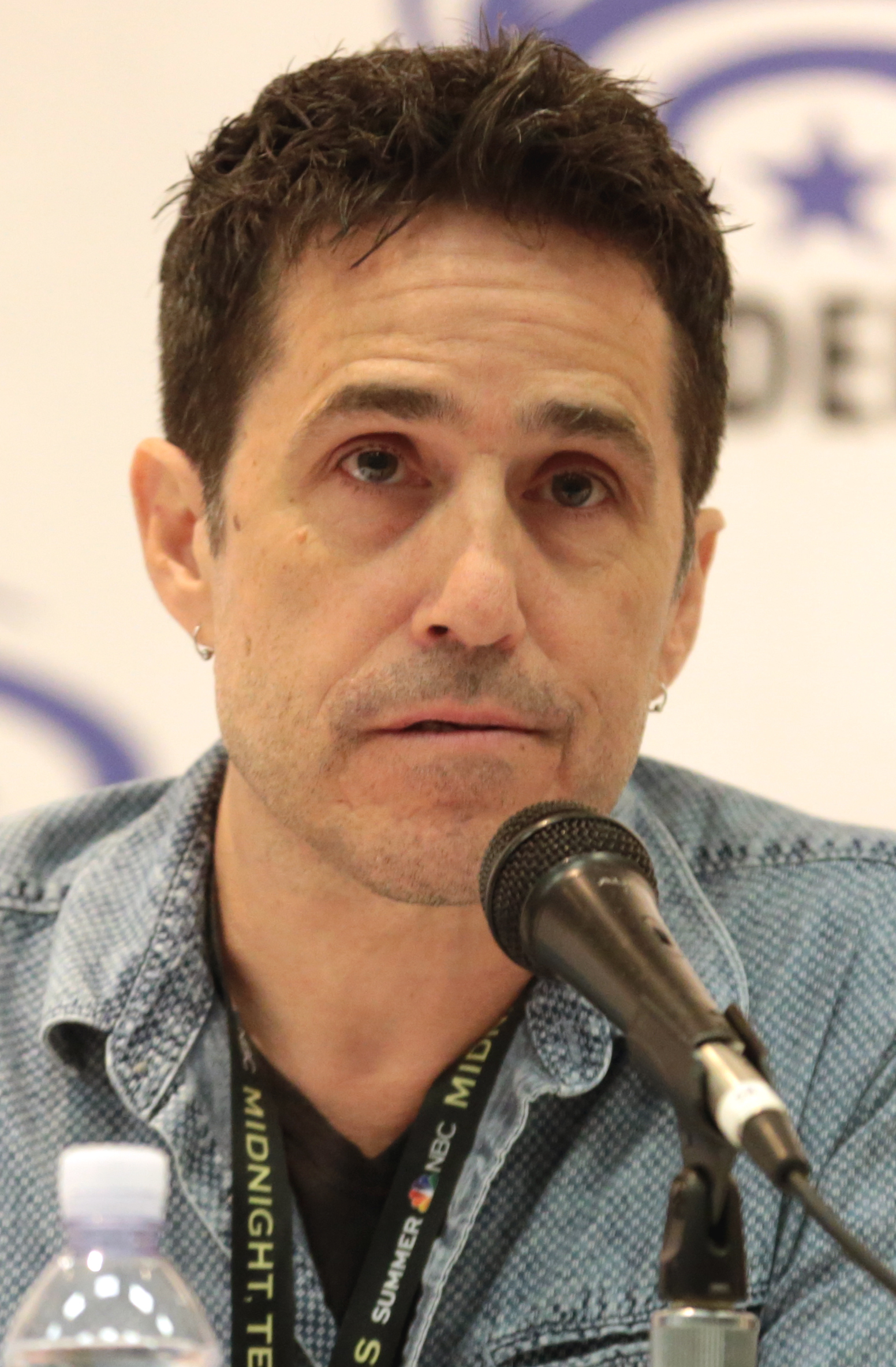
- Quayle in 2017

Background information
- Born: Frederick MacDonald Quayle, Jr. Suffolk, Virginia, U.S.
- Genres: Film and television scores; video game scores; ambient; experimental; electronic; synthwave; EDM
- Occupations: Composer; arranger; musician; music producer
- Instruments: Piano; keyboards; synthesizer
- Years active: 1987–present
- Formerly of: HQ2; Rise Robots Rise
- Website: macquayle.com

Frederick MacDonald "Mac" Quayle, Jr. is an American composer for film, television, and video games. He has worked as the score composer for several TV series, including Sam Esmail productions Mr. Robot and Gaslit; numerous Ryan Murphy productions, such as American Horror Story and its spin-offs American Horror Stories and American Crime Story, 9-1-1 and its spin-offs 9-1-1: Lone Star and 9-1-1: Nashville, Scream Queens, Feud, Pose, The Politician, Ratched, Monster, and The Beauty; as well as the series The Pact and His & Hers. Quayle has also scored additional music for films and video games, and has mixed and produced scores led by other composers. He composed the music for the film Leave the World Behind directed by Esmail.

Quayle began his career in the late 1980s, working with producer Hex Hector as HQ2 and briefly performing in hip-hop band Rise Robots Rise. He worked with Cliff Martinez as an additional composer for several films, including Drive, Contagion (both 2011), and Spring Breakers (2013). He won the Primetime Creative Arts Emmy Award for Outstanding Music Composition for a Series for Mr. Robot, and has also been nominated for three other Creative Arts Emmy Awards.

== Early life and education ==
Frederick MacDonald Quayle, Jr. was born in Suffolk, Virginia to Fred Quayle, a lawyer and politician, and Brenda Smith. He spent his early childhood in Richmond before his family moved to Norfolk. He first discovered a passion for music at age six when he sang in the choir of the Christ and St. Luke's Church, later taking piano and percussion lessons.

He attended Matthew Fontaine Maury High School for three years, but in Quayle's final year of high school, his family moved again to Chesapeake, where he ultimately graduated from Western Branch High School. During school, he served as a band member for two different bands: The Naros and The X-Raves.

== Career ==
Quayle moved to New York City to attend New York University, but departed when his internship at a studio allowed him to make a living working as a keyboard player and programmer.

In 2004, he moved to Los Angeles, where he worked as an additional composer for the CBS crime drama Cold Case. He was introduced to film composer Cliff Martinez, and would work under him on films such as The Lincoln Lawyer, Drive, and Contagion (all 2011). His work was noticed by Ryan Murphy when Quayle and Martinez worked on his television film The Normal Heart (2014), and invited him to audition to be the composer for the fourth season of American Horror Story. He was hired the day after his audition. Quayle went on to compose the score for Murphy's programs Scream Queens, American Crime Story, Feud, 9-1-1, Pose, The Politician, 9-1-1: Lone Star, and Ratched. He scored both seasons of the British thriller series The Pact.

Beginning in October 2018, Quayle collaborated with Gustavo Santaolalla to provide additional music for the 2020 video game The Last of Us Part II. At the 17th British Academy Games Awards, Quayle, Santaolalla, and Scott Hanau were nominated for the British Academy Games Award for Music.

For his work on the pilot episode of Mr. Robot, Quayle was awarded the Primetime Emmy Award for Outstanding Music Composition for a Series. He was also nominated for his work on American Horror Story and Feud.

== Personal life ==
Quayle is married to Cat Deakins, with whom he has two children.

== Filmography ==
=== Television ===
Year	Title	Role	Notes
2006	Close to Home	Additional music composer	3 episodes
2006–2010	Cold Case	Additional music composer	87 episodes
2013	Bad Samaritans	Composer	5 episodes
2014–present	American Horror Story	Composer	93 episodes
2014	The Knick	End title music arrangement	1 episode
2015–2019	Mr. Robot	Composer	45 episodes
2015–2016	Scream Queens	Composer	23 episodes
2016–2021	American Crime Story	Composer	29 episodes
2017	Feud	Composer	8 episodes
2018–present	9-1-1	Composer	With Todd Haberman, 133 episodes
2018–2021	Pose	Composer	26 episodes
2019–2020	The Politician	Composer	15 episodes
2020–2025	9-1-1: Lone Star	Composer	With Todd Haberman and Justin Burnett, 68 episodes
2020	Ratched	Composer	8 episodes
2021–2022	The Pact	Composer	12 episodes
2021–2023	American Horror Stories	Composer	5 episodes
2022	Gaslit	Composer	8 episodes
2025	Monster: The Ed Gein Story	Composer	7 episodes
2025–present	9-1-1: Nashville	Composer	7 episodes
2026	His & Hers	Composer	6 episodes
2026	The Beauty	Composer	11 episodes
2026	Dark Matter	Composer	5 episodes

=== Film ===
Year	Title	Role	Notes
2011	The Lincoln Lawyer	Music programmer	Composer: Cliff Martinez
2011	Drive	Music programmer	Composer: Cliff Martinez
2011	Contagion	Additional composer	Composer: Cliff Martinez
2012	Arbitrage	Additional composer	Composer: Cliff Martinez
2012	Savages	Additional music programmer	Composer: Adam Peters
2012	The Company You Keep	Additional composer	Composer: Cliff Martinez
2012	Stolen	Additional composer	Composer: Mark Isham
2012	Spring Breakers	Additional composer	Composer: Cliff Martinez
2013	Only God Forgives	Additional composer	Composer: Cliff Martinez
2014	The Normal Heart	Additional composer	Television film
2023	Leave the World Behind	Composer	

=== Video games ===
Year	Title	Role	Notes
2014	Far Cry 4	Additional composer	Composer: Cliff Martinez
2020	The Last of Us Part II	Additional composer	Composer: Gustavo Santaolalla

== Awards and nominations ==
Year	Award	Category	Work	Episode	Result	Ref(s)
2015	Creative Arts Emmy Awards	Outstanding Music Composition for a Limited Series, Movie, or Special	American Horror Story: Freak Show	"Orphans"	Nominated	
2016	Creative Arts Emmy Awards	Outstanding Music Composition for a Series	Mr. Robot	"eps1.0_hellofriend.mov"	Won	
2017	Creative Arts Emmy Awards	Outstanding Music Composition for a Limited Series, Movie, or Special	Feud: Bette and Joan	"Pilot"	Nominated	
2017	Creative Arts Emmy Awards	Outstanding Main Title Theme	Feud: Bette and Joan	—N/a	Nominated	
2021	British Academy Games Awards	Best Music	The Last of Us Part II	—N/a	Nominated (Note: Shared with Gustavo Santaolalla and Scott Hanau)	
