= Elliot Villar =

American theater and screen actor (born 1980)

- Born: June 6, 1980 (age 46); New York City, New York, U.S.
- Education: Vassar College (BA); Yale University (MFA)
- Spouse: Emily Dorsch

Elliot Villar (born June 6, 1980) is an American theater and screen actor. He made his Broadway debut in 2011 as part of the original cast of War Horse. He is perhaps best known for his role as Fernando Vera in the USA Network show Mr. Robot.

== Early life and education ==
Villar was born on June 6, 1980, in the Bronx, New York. He attended the Villa Maria Academy in the northeastern Bronx for grammar school and received a scholarship to attend the Fieldston School, from which he graduated in 1998. Villar studied drama at Vassar College and received a Bachelor of Arts degree there in 2002. After graduating, Villar was selected for a year-long fellowship with the Shakespeare Theater Company of Washington, D.C. He then returned to New York City for a year before being accepted into the Yale School of Drama. He graduated in 2007 with a Master of Fine Arts in Acting. Villar also trained at the British American Drama Academy and the National Theatre Institute.

== Career ==
Villar began his professional acting career in 2003 as a fellow of the Shakespeare Theater Company in Washington, D.C. He acted in multiple regional theater productions during this period and made his screen acting debut in the 2004 independent comedy Knots. He then went on to receive an MFA in acting, after which he began a successful New York theater career. In 2007, he starred as Demetrius in the Public Theater's production of A Midsummer Night Dream for their Shakespeare in the Park program. That Fall, he starred in the off-Broadway production The Brothers Size opposite Brian Tyree Henry. In the following three years, he was part of the acclaimed casts of the regional production Boleros for the Disenchanted, the musical Coraline at the Lucille Lortel Theatre, the Shakespeare-adaptation The Age of Iron with the Classic Stage Company, and After the Revolution with Playwrights Horizon. He also had small roles in films and television shows, including The Rebound and Law & Order.

Villar made his Broadway debut in 2011 as part of the cast of the American production of War Horse. As part of the original cast, he played the roles of Allan and Sodat Klausen. The production was critically acclaimed and received five Tony Awards that year. Villar stayed with the production until it closed in January 2013.

In 2013, Villar was in the limited-run production of Collapse at the New York City Center. He also guest acted on episodes of the shows Blue Bloods and Elementary. From 2014 onwards, Villar began acting more for television. He guest starred on many different network TV shows. His first recurring role was in 2015 as Thomas Schmidt in a two-episode arc in FOX's Gotham. In the same year, he had a recurring role in The Affair.

In July 2015, Villar debuted his character Fernando Vera, an eccentric Dominican gangster, in the series premiere of USA's Mr. Robot. He appeared in three episodes in the first season and next appeared in the post-credit scene of the third season's finale episode. Villar was promoted to a main character in the show's fourth and final season.

In the four years following 2015, Villar guest starred on seven television shows and held recurring roles on four other shows; these include AMC's The Son, a seven-episode arc on the science fiction drama Time After Time, as an FBI agent in Sneaky Pete, and as Detective Herrera in the CBS anthology thriller show Tell Me a Story. He returned to the stage in 2018 for the off-Broadway production of Mary Page Marlowe at the Second Stage Theatre.

== Personal life ==
Villar is married to actress Emily Dorsch.

== Filmography ==
=== Television ===
Year	Title	Role	Notes
2008	The Return of Jezebel James	Francis	Episode: "Return of the Crazy Jackal Shillelagh Lady"
2009	The Beautiful Life: TBL	DJ	Episode: "Pilot"
2010	Law & Order	Oscar Silva	Episode: "Brazil"
2010	Mercy	Dale's Officer	Episode: "We All Saw This Coming"
2013	Blue Bloods	James Montero	Episode: "Drawing Dead"
2013	Elementary	Christian Suarez	Episode: "Blood is Thicker"
2014	The Good Wife	Dr. Ian Vail	Episode: "Dramatics, Your Honor"
2014	Black Box	Bomb Squad Tech	Episode: "Kodachrome"
2015	Gotham	Thomas Schmidt	2 episodes
2015	The Blacklist	Loyd Munroe	Episode: "The Longevity Initiative (No. 97)"
2015	American Odyssey	Aide	Episode: "Kmag Yoyo"
2015–19	Mr. Robot	Fernando Vera	9 episodes
2015	The Affair	Andrew Nunez	2 episodes
2016	The Mysteries of Laura	Yasiel Leon	Episode: "The Mystery of the Political Operation"
2017	The Son	Cesar Sanchez	2 episodes
2017	Time After Time	Doug Lawson	7 episodes
2018	Sneaky Pete	Agent Kent / Adam	3 episodes
2018	Deception	Feliz Ruiz	Episode: "Pilot"
2018	Shades of Blue	Officer Stone	Episode: "The Reckoning"
2018	Tell Me a Story	Detective Herrera	2 episodes
2019	The Enemy Within	Steven Haibach	Episode: "An Offer"
2019	The Code	Captain Tevez	Episode: "P.O.G."
2019	The Chi	Robert Moreno	Episode: "Blind Eye"
2019–20	God Friended Me	Miguel	2 episodes
2020	Manifest	Ward Attwood	Episode: "Call Sign"
2020	Law & Order: Special Victims Unit	Marc Vargas	Episode: "Ballad of Dwight and Irena"
2021	Prodigal Son	Clayton Fielder	Episode: "Exit Strategy"
2021–22	Law & Order: Organized Crime	Teddy Garcia	4 episodes
2023	Succession	Daniel Jiménez	5 episodes
2024	The Equalizer	Charles Benson	Episode: "All Bets Are Off"
2024	FBI	Mario Becerra	Episode: "Pledges"

=== Film ===
Year	Title	Role	Notes
2004	Knots	Oblivious mover	
2008	Two Lovers	Bystander	
2009	The Rebound	Yael	
2012	Jagoo	Jagoo	Short film
2015	The Intern	Escalade Driver	
2018	Loser Leaves Town	Francisco	Short film
2021	A Certain Kind of Person	Oscar	Short film
2026	Disclosure Day	Agent Diaz	

== Theater ==
Year	Title	Role	Venue
2002	The Winter's Tale	Ensemble	Michael R. Klein Theatre: August 27 – October 20, 2002
2004	I'm with Mauricio	Alex	INTAR Theater: June 25–27, 2004
2004	El amor de Don Perlimplín con Belisa en su jardín	Perlimpín	Repertorio Español: 2004
2005	The Winter's Tale	Florizel	Mary Rippon Outdoor Theatre: June 30 – August 13, 2005
2006	All's Well That Ends Well	Lord Dumaine	Yale Repertory Theater: April 27 – May 20, 2006
2007	A Midsummer Night's Dream	Demetrius	Delacorte Theater: August 8 – September 9, 2007
2007	The Brothers Size	Elegba	The Public Theater: January 16 – March 16, 2008
2008	Boleros for the Disenchanted	Eusebo/Oskar	Huntington Theatre: October 10 – November 15, 2008
2009	Coraline	Mr. Bobo/Others	Lucille Lortel Theatre: May 8 – July 5, 2009
2009	The Age of Iron	Hector	Classic Stage: November 4 – December 6, 2009
2010	After the Revolution	Miguel	Playwrights Horizon: October 21 – December 12, 2010
2011–13	War Horse	Allan/Soldat	Vivian Beaumont Theatre: March 15, 2011 – January 6, 2013
2013	Collapse	David	New York City Center: August 10 – September 10, 2013
2018	Mary Page Marlowe	Ben	Second Stage Theatre: April 7 – August 19, 2018
