= Michael Drayer =

American actor

- Born: March 19, 1986 (age 40); Staten Island, New York, U.S
- Occupation: Actor
- Years active: 2004–present

Michael Drayer (born March 19, 1986) is an American actor. He is best known for his recurring role as Cisco on the television drama–thriller series Mr. Robot, Gabe on the television drama series Deception, and for his supporting role as Eddie in Sneaky Pete. Drayer also acted in Vinyl, The Sopranos, The Following, Aquarius, Timeless, and Louie. In addition to television work, he also appeared in The Wrestler, August Rush, and Before I Disappear. He also stars in season 3 of Hightown, playing drug dealer Owen Frawley.

== Filmography ==
=== Film ===
| Year | Title | Role | Notes |
|---|---|---|---|
| 2007 | August Rush | Mannix | |
| 2008 | The Wrestler | Strip Club Bachelor | |
| 2009 | Camp Victory | Pete the Pistol | Short |
| 2010 | Treasure of the Black Jaguar | Shlomo | |
| 2010 | White Irish Drinkers | Dennis | |
| 2013 | Sharkproof | Freddy Krebs | |
| 2013 | All Is Bright | Bobby | |
| 2013 | Grandma's Not a Toaster | Eddie | Short |
| 2014 | God's Pocket | Danny | |
| 2014 | Before I Disappear | Jordan | |
| 2014 | The Gift | Bud | Short |
| 2015 | Condemned | Officer Thomas | |
| 2016 | Nerve | Officer McMillan | |
| 2017 | The Vanishing of Sidney Hall | Max | |
| 2021 | Catch the Fair One | Danny | |
| 2021 | Flinch | Connor | |
| 2021 | Baby Money | Gil | |

=== Television ===
| Year | Title | Role | Notes |
|---|---|---|---|
| 2004 | Third Watch | Tony Terror | Episode: "Rat Bastard" |
| 2005 | Jonny Zero | White Kid | Episode: "No Good Deed" |
| 2005–2006 | Law & Order: Special Victims Unit | Nicky Sims; Shawn | 2 episodes |
| 2007 | The Sopranos | Jason Parisi | 4 episodes |
| 2008 | Law & Order: Criminal Intent | Jamie Stephens | Episode: "Neighborhood Watch" |
| 2009 | Law & Order | Kyle Chase | Episode: "Promote This!" |
| 2009 | The Unusuals | Ralph Chapelle | Episode: "The Apology Line" |
| 2009 | Mercy | Dale | Episode: "We All Saw This Coming" |
| 2010 | Royal Pains | Policeman | Episode "Keeping the Faith" |
| 2010 | Louie | Sean | Episode: "Bully" |
| 2011 | Person of Interest | Anton O'Mara | Episode: "Pilot" |
| 2012 | NYC 22 | Jerry Williams | 2 episodes |
| 2012 | Made in Jersey | Albert Garretti | 6 episodes |
| 2013 | The Following | Rick Kester | 3 episodes |
| 2013 | Deception | Gabe | 9 episodes |
| 2014 | Believe | Pat 'Patty' Farnsworth | Episode: "Sinking" |
| 2015 | Aquarius | Jimmy Too Butano | 3 episodes |
| 2015–2017 | Mr. Robot | Francis "Cisco" Shaw | 12 episodes |
| 2015–2017 | Sneaky Pete | Eddie | 10 episodes |
| 2016 | Blue Bloods | Marcus Beale | Episode: "Friends in Need" |
| 2016 | Shades of Blue | Joaquin Foster | 4 episodes |
| 2016 | Vinyl | Detective Renk | 5 episodes |
| 2016 | Difficult People | James | Episode: "Hashtag Cats" |
| 2017 | Timeless | Harry Houdini | Episode: "The World's Columbian Exposition" |
| 2017 | NCIS | Carlo Hackett | Episode: "A Bowl of Cherries" |
| 2017 | Wisdom of the Crowd | Ryan Booth | Episode: "Machine Learning" |
| 2018 | Blindspot | Michael Ganzman | Episode: "Galaxy of Minds" |
| 2018 | Claws | Clint | 3 episodes |
| 2018 | Manifest | Ronnie Wilcox | Episode: "S.N.A.F.U." |
| 2018 | Bull | Chris Coleman | Episode: "But for the Grace" |
| 2019 | NCIS: Los Angeles | Nick Moore | Episode: "Concours D'Elegance" |
| 2020 | A Million Little Things | Derek | 2 episodes |
| 2021 | Chicago P.D. | Tommy | Episode: "Instinct" |
| 2021 | FBI: Most Wanted | Evan Greeter | Episode: "Chattaboogie" |
| 2022 | Law & Order: Organized Crime | Kenny Kyle | 3 episodes |
| 2024 | Hightown | Owen Farley | 6 Episodes |
