= Ben Rappaport =

American actor (born 1986)

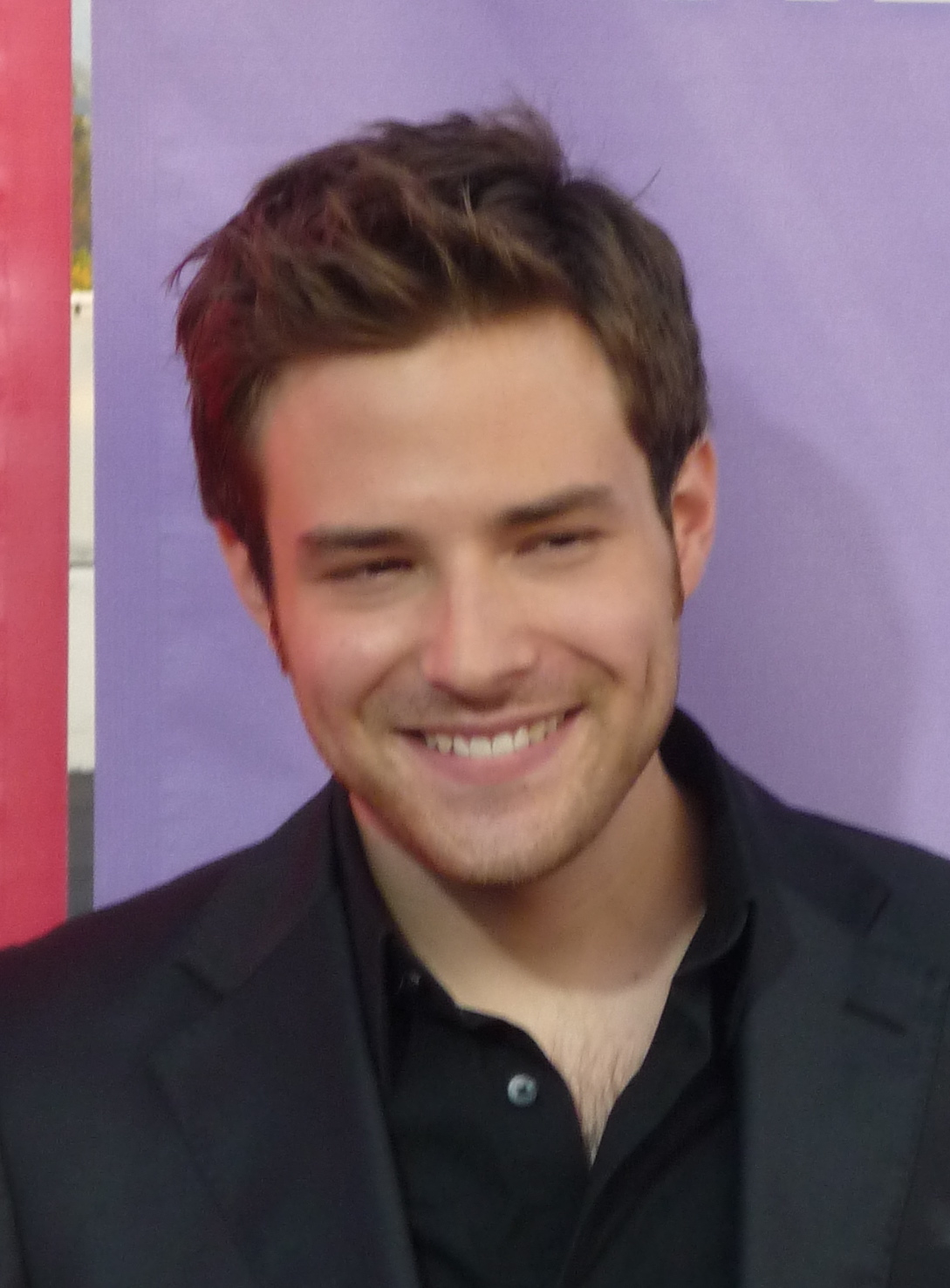
- Rappaport in July 2010
- Born: March 23, 1986 (age 40); Arlington, Texas, U.S.
- Education: Juilliard School (BFA)
- Occupation: Actor
- Years active: 2010–present
- Spouse: Megan Kane (m. 2017)

Ben Rappaport (born March 23, 1986) is an American actor. He made his acting debut on the NBC sitcom Outsourced (2010–2011), in which he portrayed the lead role of Todd Dempsy. He is also known for his roles as Carey Zepps on The Good Wife (2013–2016), Ollie Parker on Mr. Robot (2015–2019), Max Horowitz on Younger (2016–2021), Josh Silverberg on Ozark (2017–2022), and Seth Oliver on For the People (2018–2019).

== Life and career ==
Rappaport was born in Arlington, Texas, and was active in the arts (painting and playing guitar) during his childhood. He was raised in the Jewish religion, and his Jewish identity is important to him. He attended Klein High School near Houston. Rappaport developed an interest in acting at the age of fifteen, and subsequently graduated from the Juilliard School in New York City where he studied acting. He was the recipient of the Michel and Suria Saint-Denis Prize as a Juilliard student, which is the Drama Department's highest honor.

Rappaport was featured in a Kay Jeweler's holiday commercial. The ad was well known because it prominently featured sign language and a deaf character. In 2010, Rappaport was cast in the lead role as Todd Dempsy in the NBC sitcom Outsourced. The role marked Rappaport's first on-screen acting job. Rappaport had previously performed in theater and stage productions. He resides in Studio City, Los Angeles.

He has had recurring roles on The Good Wife as Carey Zepps (2013–2016), Mr. Robot as Ollie Parker (2015–2019), Younger as Max Horowitz (2016–2021), and Ozark as Josh Silverberg (2017–2022).

He was a series regular on the Shondaland drama For the People, playing the role of Seth Oliver (2018–2019).

Rappaport appeared as Perchik in the 2015 broadway revival of Fiddler on the Roof.

In April 2023, he starred on Broadway playing Jack Paar in the Tony Award-winning play Good Night, Oscar, opposite Tony Award winner Sean Hayes.

== Filmography ==
Film
Year	Title	Role	Notes
2012	Hope Springs	Brad	
2012	The Brass Teapot	Ricky	
2016	Better Off Single	Nathan	
2018	Landing Up	David	
2018	Ask for Jane	Bill	
2024	Albany Road	Craig	

Television
Year	Title	Role	Notes
2010–2011	Outsourced	Todd Dempsy	Main role
2012	Elementary	Dr. Cahill	Episode: "Lesser Evils"
2013–2016	The Good Wife	Carey Zepps	14 episodes
2015–2019	Mr. Robot	Ollie Parker	9 episodes
2016–2021	Younger	Max Horowitz	10 episodes
2017	The Vietnam War	Denton ("Mogie") Crocker	Voice; 2 episodes
2017–2022	Ozark	Josh Silverberg	Recurring role
2018–2019	For the People	Seth Oliver	Main role
2020	Blindspot	Gregory Burke	Episode: "Awl In"
2021	Modern Love	Nick	Episode: "In the Waiting Room of Estranged Spouses"
2021	Evil	Brian Castle	Episode: "F Is for Fire"
2021	Law & Order: Special Victims Unit	George Howard	2 episodes
2022	Inventing Anna	Billy McFarland	Episode: "A Wolf in Chic Clothing"
2025	Grosse Pointe Garden Society	Brett	Lead role

=== Theatre ===
Year	Title	Role
2015	Fiddler on the Roof	Perchik
2023	Good Night, Oscar	Jack Paar
