= Mr. Robot =

American television series (2015–2019)

- Genre: Drama; Techno-thriller; Psychological thriller; Crime thriller
- Created by: Sam Esmail
- Showrunner: Sam Esmail
- Directed by: Sam Esmail; Various (season 1)
- Starring: Rami Malek; Carly Chaikin; Portia Doubleday; Martin Wallström; Christian Slater; Michael Cristofer; Stephanie Corneliussen; Grace Gummer; BD Wong; Bobby Cannavale; Elliot Villar; Ashlie Atkinson
- Composer: Mac Quayle
- Country of origin: United States
- Original language: English
- No. of seasons: 4
- No. of episodes: 45 (list of episodes)

Production
- Executive producers: Sam Esmail; Steve Golin; Chad Hamilton; Joseph E. Iberti; Kyle Bradstreet
- Producers: Igor Srubshchik; Christian Slater; Rami Malek
- Production location: New York City
- Cinematography: Tod Campbell; Tim Ives (pilot)
- Camera setup: Single-camera
- Running time: 40–65 minutes
- Production companies: Esmail Corp (seasons 2–4); Anonymous Content; Universal Content Productions

Original release
- Network: USA Network
- Release: June 24, 2015 – December 22, 2019

Mr. Robot is an American psychological techno-thriller television series created by Sam Esmail for USA Network. It stars Rami Malek as Elliot Alderson, a cybersecurity engineer and hacker with social anxiety disorder, clinical depression, and dissociative identity disorder. Elliot is recruited by an insurrectionary anarchist known as "Mr. Robot", played by Christian Slater, to join a group of hacktivists called "fsociety". The group aims to destroy all debt records by encrypting the financial data of E Corp, the largest conglomerate in the world.

The pilot premiered online and via video on demand services on May 27, 2015. In addition to Malek and Slater, the series stars an ensemble cast featuring Carly Chaikin, Portia Doubleday, Martin Wallström, Michael Cristofer, Stephanie Corneliussen, Grace Gummer, BD Wong, Bobby Cannavale, Elliot Villar, and Ashlie Atkinson. The first season debuted on USA Network on June 24, 2015; the second season premiered on July 13, 2016; and the third season premiered on October 11, 2017. The fourth and final season premiered on October 6, 2019, and concluded on December 22, 2019.

Mr. Robot received critical acclaim, particularly for the performances of Malek and Slater, its story and visual presentation and Mac Quayle's musical score. The series has gained a cult following. Esmail has received praise for his direction of the series, having directed three episodes in the first season before serving as the sole director for the remainder of the show. The show received numerous accolades, including two Golden Globe Awards, three Primetime Emmy Awards, and a Peabody Award.

== Premise ==
The series follows Elliot Alderson, a young man living in New York City, who works at the cybersecurity company Allsafe as a cybersecurity engineer. Constantly struggling with social anxiety, dissociative identity disorder, clinical depression and drug abuse, Elliot's thought process seems heavily influenced by paranoia and delusion. He connects with people by hacking them, which often leads him to act as a cyber-vigilante. He is recruited by a mysterious insurrectionary anarchist known as Mr. Robot and joins his team of hacktivists known as fsociety. One of their primary missions is to cancel all consumer debt by encrypting all the data of one of the largest corporations in the world, E Corp (which Elliot perceives as Evil Corp), which also happens to be Allsafe's biggest client.

The series is described as a techno-thriller and psychological thriller.

== Episodes ==
Season	Episodes	Originally released	
Season	Episodes	First released	Last released
1	10	June 24, 2015	September 2, 2015
2	12	July 13, 2016	September 21, 2016
3	10	October 11, 2017	December 13, 2017
4	13	October 6, 2019	December 22, 2019

== Cast and characters ==
=== Main ===
- Rami Malek as Elliot Alderson, a senior cybersecurity engineer at Allsafe Cybersecurity and a vigilante hacker. He has dissociative identity disorder and deals with other mental illnesses such as clinical depression and severe anxiety, which are partly responsible for his antisocial behavior and drug use. Elliot's hacker nickname is "Sam Sepiol" or "samsepi0l". Elliot as a child is portrayed by Aidan Liebman (seasons 1–2), Alex Bento (season 3), and Evan Whitten (season 4).
- Carly Chaikin as Darlene Alderson, Elliot's younger sister, a malware coder and one of the fsociety hackers.
- Portia Doubleday as Angela Moss, Elliot's childhood friend and a fellow employee at Allsafe and later a PR Manager for E Corp. Mabel Tyler portrays a young Angela.
- Martin Wallström as Tyrell Wellick, originally the ambitious Senior Vice President of Technology at E Corp and later part of fsociety.
- Christian Slater as Mr. Robot, an insurrectionary anarchist who recruits Elliot into an underground hacker group called fsociety and Edward Alderson, Elliot's father.
- Michael Cristofer as Phillip Price, the CEO of E Corp (seasons 2–4; recurring season 1).
- Stephanie Corneliussen as Joanna Wellick, Tyrell's wife (seasons 2–3; (Note: Credited as a regular up to the second episode of the third season.) recurring season 1).
- Grace Gummer as Dominique "Dom" DiPierro, an FBI field agent investigating the E Corp hack (seasons 2–4).
- BD Wong as Whiterose, a trans woman, cyber-terrorist and leader of the Dark Army who is also China's Minister of State Security under her birth name, Zhi Zhang (seasons 3–4; recurring seasons 1–2). A younger version of Whiterose was portrayed by Ross Kurt Le (season 4).
- Bobby Cannavale as Irving, a car salesman who is a Dark Army fixer (season 3; guest season 4).
- Elliot Villar as Fernando Vera, Shayla's drug supplier and Elliot's only supply of suboxone who has a unique dangerous philosophy and is obsessed with Shayla and later Elliot (season 4; recurring season 1; guest season 3).
- Ashlie Atkinson as Janice, a chatty taxidermist and a Dark Army fixer with a peculiar sense of humor (season 4).

=== Recurring ===
- Gloria Reuben as Dr. Krista Gordon, Elliot's therapist.
- Michel Gill as Gideon Goddard, the CEO of Allsafe Security (seasons 1–2; guest season 3).
- Ben Rappaport as Ollie Parker, Angela's ex-boyfriend and an employee at Allsafe (season 1; guest seasons 2, 4).
- Aaron Takahashi as Lloyd Chong, Elliot's coworker at Allsafe (season 1; guest seasons 2, 4).
- Frankie Shaw as Shayla Nico, Elliot's drug dealer, next door neighbor and former lover (season 1).
- Ron Cephas Jones as Leslie Romero, a member of fsociety (season 1; guest season 2).
- Sunita Mani as Shama "Trenton" Biswas, a member of fsociety (seasons 1–2; guest season 3).
- Azhar Khan as Sunil "Mobley" Markesh, a member of fsociety and Bank of E employee (seasons 1–2; guest season 3).
- Bruce Altman as Terry Colby, a former CTO of E Corp who is framed by fsociety for a hack attack (season 1; guest seasons 2–3).
- Armand Schultz as Lenny Shannon, Krista's ex-boyfriend and one of Elliot's early hacking targets (season 1; guest seasons 2–3).
- Michael Drayer as Francis "Cisco" Shaw, Darlene's ex-boyfriend who was the U.S. liaison to the Chinese hacker group Dark Army (seasons 1–2; guest season 3).
- Brian Stokes Mitchell as Scott Knowles, the CTO of E Corp following Colby's arrest (seasons 1–2).
- Jeremy Holm as Donald "Mr. Sutherland" Hoffman, a fixer under Tyrell and Joanna Wellick (seasons 1–2; guest season 3).
- Sakina Jaffrey as Antara Nayar, Angela's lawyer (seasons 1–2; guest season 3).
- Don Sparks as Donald Moss, Angela's adopted father (season 1; guest season 2).
- Michele Hicks as Sharon Knowles, Scott's wife (season 1; guest season 2).
- Vaishnavi Sharma as Magda Alderson, Elliot's abusive mother (seasons 1–2, 4).
- Rick Gonzalez as Isaac Vera, Fernando Vera's younger brother (season 1).
- Nadia Gan as Elizabeth, Tyrell's assistant (season 1; guest season 4).
- Stephen Lin as The Hamburger Man, Elliot's contact with the Dark Army (season 3; guest seasons 1–2, 4).
- Joey Badass as Leon, a close friend of Elliot and an inmate who is obsessed with sitcoms, as well as an agent for the Dark Army, he is responsible for Elliot's safety (seasons 2–4).
- Bernadette Quigley as the chaplain who hosts a prayer group attended by Elliot (season 2).
- Sandrine Holt as Susan Jacobs, an E Corp General Counsel known as Madame Executioner (season 2).
- Anthony Jennings as Vincent, a fsociety member who was given orders by Darlene (season 2).
- Erik Jensen as Frank Cody, a conspiracy theorist and a talk show host (seasons 2–3).
- Chris Conroy as Derek, Joanna's secret lover who works as a bartender and a DJ (season 2; guest season 3).
- Craig Robinson as Ray Heyworth, a prison warden who secretly runs a Tor routed website involving human trafficking, drugs and weapons (season 2).
- Michael Maize as "Lone Star" Lockwood, a Texas native and an off-balanced prison guard and associate of Ray (season 2).
- Omar Metwally as Ernesto Santiago, Dom's superior at the FBI who also works for the Dark Army to protect Tyrell Wellick (seasons 2–3).
- Grant Chang as Grant, Whiterose's assistant and lover (seasons 2–3).
- Luke Robertson as RT, Ray's former system admin (season 2).
- Rizwan Manji as Norm Gill, Dom's new partner working with her to investigate the 5/9 hack (season 3).
- Ramy Youssef as Samar Swailem, Elliot's coworker at E Corp (season 3).
- Christine M. Campbell as Janet Robinson, a high-level manager at E Corp (season 3).
- Kathryn Danielle as Bobbi, the HR manager at E Corp (season 3).
- Josh Mostel as Bo, Elliot's landlord (season 3).
- Jing Xu as Wang Shu, Whiterose's assistant (season 4).
- Jake Busey as Freddy Lomax, a lawyer who had ties with the Dark Army (season 4).
- Dominik García as Olivia Cortez, an employee for Cyprus National Bank (season 4).
- Alex Morf as Deegan Maguire, an Irish criminal (season 4).
- Young M.A as Peanuts, Fernando Vera's loyal henchman (season 4).
- Jahneer E. Williams as Javi, Fernando Vera's second loyal henchman (season 4).

== Production ==
=== Conception and development ===
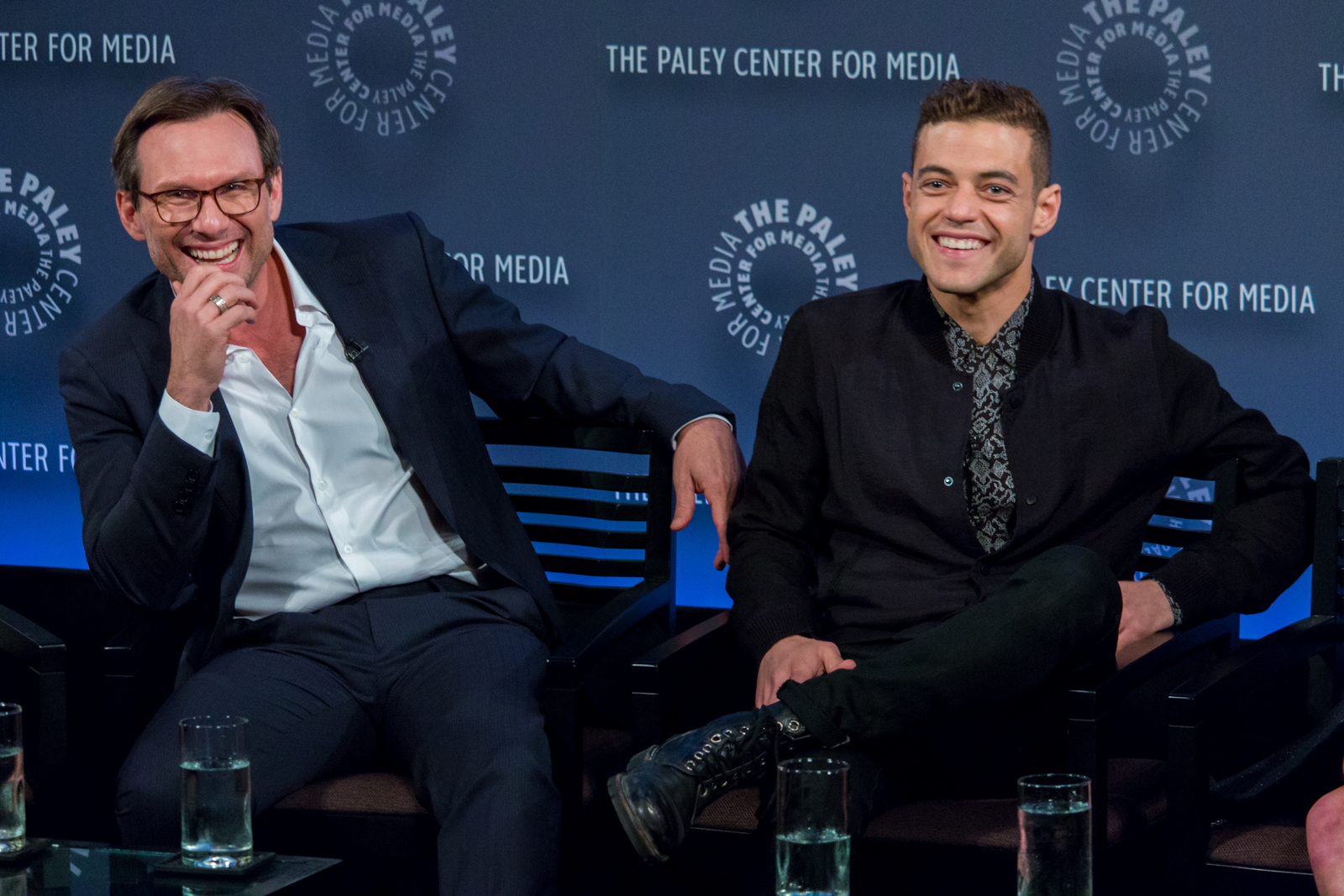
Series stars Christian Slater (left) and Rami Malek (right) speaking as part of the Mr. Robot panel during the 2015 PaleyFest. Slater has also served as a producer since the first season, while Malek began producing in season 3.

Sam Esmail, the show's creator and showrunner, is the credited writer on the vast majority of the episodes. In an interview, Esmail shared that he is fascinated by hacker culture and wanted to make a film about it for around 15 years. In the production, Esmail consulted experts to give a realistic picture of hacking activities. Another inspiration for Esmail, who is of Egyptian descent, was the 2011 Arab Spring, mainly the Egyptian Revolution, where young people who were angry at society used social media to bring about a change. He has said that Elliot is a "thinly-veiled version" of himself.

Esmail had originally intended Mr. Robot to be a feature film, with the end of the first act being someone finding out that he had a mental disorder while enacting a greater scheme. However, midway through writing the first act, he found that the script had expanded considerably, and that it had become better-suited for a television show. He removed 20 of around 89 pages of the script then written, and used it as the pilot for the series, and what was to have been the end of the first act became the finale of the first season. Esmail took the script to film and television production company Anonymous Content to see if it could be developed into a television series, which was then picked up by USA Network. USA gave a pilot order to Mr. Robot in July 2014. After an exhaustive search to cast the lead role, it was announced in September 2014 that Rami Malek had been cast as Elliot; the remainder of the roles in the pilot were cast later in September and October.

USA picked it up to series with a 10-episode order in December 2014. Production began in New York on April 13, 2015. The pilot premiered on multiple online and video on demand services on May 27, 2015, and the series was renewed for a second season before the first season premiered on USA on June 24, 2015. In December 2015, it was announced that Esmail would direct all episodes in the second season. In June 2016, it was announced that the second season's episode order was increased from 10 to 12 episodes. The 12-episode second season premiered on July 13, 2016. On August 16, 2016, USA renewed Mr. Robot for a third season to air in 2017. The third season debuted in October 2017 and consisted of 10 episodes. All episodes were directed by Esmail, just as in the second season. On December 13, 2017, USA renewed Mr. Robot for a fourth season. In August 2018, it was confirmed that the fourth season would be the final season.

Originally, the show planned to dress Elliot in a worn sweatshirt and colorful backpack; however, Malek suggested a black backpack and wore his own B:Scott black hoodie to set. The outfit became the signature look for the character, and the costume designer ordered 20 more of them, despite the item having been discontinued years earlier. To portray the unusual, often confused worldview of lead character Elliot Alderson, Franklin Peterson, who edited three Mr. Robot episodes in the first season and six in the second season, used creative editing styles that included jump cuts, varied lengths of takes and shuffling scenes around within an episode and sometimes even between episodes. Esmail encouraged the experimentation as Peterson and his team explored the personality of each character in the editing suite, finding creative ways to tell their stories and maintain their humanity.

=== Cinematography ===
The show's cinematographer Tod Campbell is known for helping craft "a distinct moody and disruptive" feel to the scenes' atmosphere through stylistic lighting and camera choices. The unorthodox approach taken involves characters "placed at the very bottom of the frame" which in turn "leaves massive amounts of headroom that suggests a great weight hanging over their heads, and echoes their isolation." The intended effect for audiences is to feel a sense of "mounting paranoia and dissociation" of the protagonist.

=== Visual effects and soundtrack ===
FuseFX was hired to provide the visual effects for episode "eps3.4_runtime-error.r00" of season 3, in which they took 40 shots and stitched them together to appear as one seamless shot for the entire episode.

Composer Mac Quayle created the soundtrack.

=== Technical accuracy ===
Mr. Robot has been widely praised for its technical accuracy by numerous cybersecurity firms and services such as Avast, Panda Security, Avira, Kaspersky, Proton Mail, and bloggers who analyzed and dissected the technical aspects of the show after episodes portraying hacking scenes aired. Aside from the pilot episode, Esmail hired Kor Adana (former network security analyst and forensics manager for Toyota Motor Sales), Michael Bazzell (security consultant and former FBI Cyber Crimes Task Force agent and investigator) and James Plouffe (lead solutions architect at MobileIron) as his advisors to oversee the technical accuracy of the show. By the second season, Adana assembled a team of hackers and cybersecurity experts including Jeff Moss (founder and director of Black Hat and DEF CON computer security conferences), Marc Rogers (principal security researcher for Cloudflare and head of security for DEF CON), Ryan Kazanciyan (who was then chief security architect for Tanium and is now the CISO at Wiz) and Andre McGregor (former FBI Cyber Special agent who was then director of security for Tanium and now CEO of ForceMetrics) to assist him with the authenticity of the hacks and the technology being used. Hacking scenes were performed by members of the technical team in real life, recorded and rebuilt using Flash animation. Animation process is carried out by animator Adam Brustein under the direct supervision of Adana himself. Kali Linux and its tools were used in multiple episodes.

The show has also attempted to accurately represent Elliot's mental health issues. In an interview with Terry Gross for the radio show Fresh Air, Malek recounted contacting a psychologist to learn about schizophrenia, dissociative identity disorder, and social anxiety. When in meetings with Esmail, Malek's knowledge on the topics led Esmail to bring the psychologist on as a consultant for the show. Subsequently, the show has been widely praised by critics, viewers and psychiatrists as being one of the most accurate representations of mental health issues ever portrayed on TV or film, especially for its depictions of dissociative identity disorder, social anxiety, panic disorders and chronic depression. Malek and Chaikin's performances have been further singled out for their "raw and authentic depictions of mental illness [which] makes it more relatable to those who haven't experienced it firsthand" while also representing a "kindred spirit" to viewers who do have mental health issues. Inverse described Mr. Robot as "setting a new standard for depictions of mental illness [in media] ... without ending up exploitative."

=== Influences ===
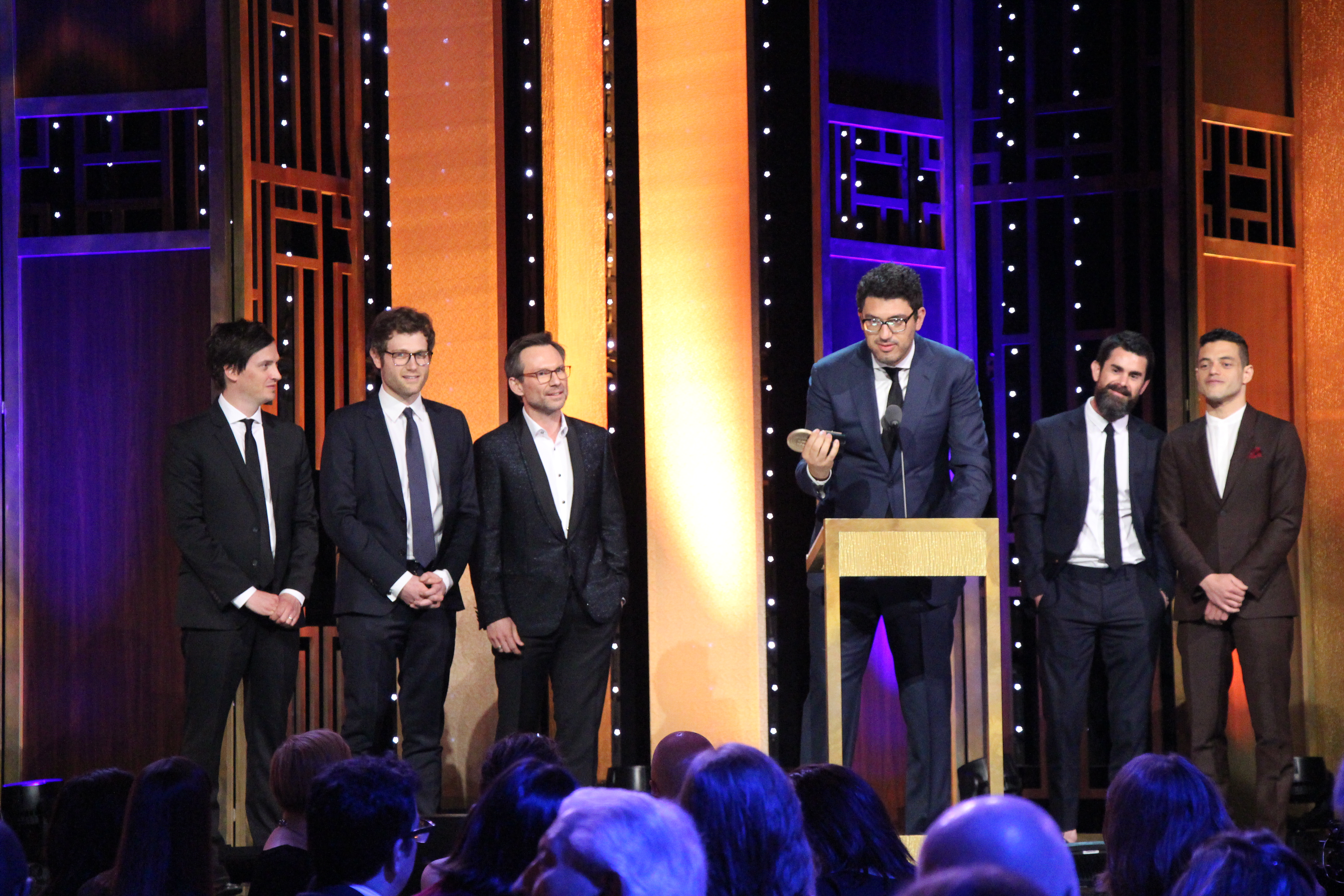
Sam Esmail, Rami Malek, and others accepting the 2016 Peabody Award for Mr. Robot

Sam Esmail has acknowledged several major influences on the show, such as American Psycho, Taxi Driver, A Clockwork Orange, and The Matrix. In particular, Esmail credited Fight Club as the inspiration for a main character who has dissociative identity disorder creating a new manifestation of his deceased father in the form of a hacker, as well as for the anti-consumerist, anti-establishment, and anti-capitalist spirit of its characters. Commentators have also noted the parallel in its plot on the erasing of consumer debt records to the film. Even so, Lauren Lawson for GQ remarked, "Mr. Robot elevates the Fight Club formula: the show's mindfuckery lubes us up to think about society (Elliot's and ours) in a discerning way, but it's not the main event. You can see Fight Club once and pretty much get the picture, but it will take years of scholarly binge-watching to answer the questions Mr. Robot raises." In an interview, Esmail explains how playing the song that David Fincher used to underscore the climax of Fight Club ("Where Is My Mind?") when Elliot initiates the hack in episode nine is intended as a message to the audience that he is aware of the inspiration they took from the film. The narration by the protagonist was influenced by Taxi Driver, and other influences mentioned included Risky Business for its music score, Blade Runner for the character development, and the television series Breaking Bad for the story arc.

=== Filming locations ===
The series was filmed in New York. Filming locations include Silvercup Studios, Queens College and Coney Island, which serves as the exterior of the base of operations for the hacking group fsociety. As the production crew was unable to shut down Times Square for filming, the scenes at Times Square in the first-season finale were shot late at night just before the July 4 holiday weekend to catch the area at its emptiest while other shots were done on sets. Production on the second season began on March 7, 2016, resuming filming in New York City.

=== Aftershows ===
In June 2016, USA Network announced Hacking Robot, a live aftershow hosted by Andy Greenwald to air during the second season. Hacking Robot debuted after the second-season premiere and aired again following the tenth episode. In addition, a weekly web-only aftershow titled Mr. Robot Digital After Show premiered on The Verge and USA Network's websites after the third episode, and continued through the third season.

== Reception ==
=== Critical response ===
Critical response of Mr. Robot
Season	Rotten Tomatoes	Metacritic
1	98% (146 reviews)	79 (24 reviews)
2	90% (241 reviews)	81 (28 reviews)
3	92% (143 reviews)	82 (9 reviews)
4	96% (115 reviews)	81 (5 reviews)

==== Season 1 ====
The first season of Mr. Robot received critical acclaim. On Rotten Tomatoes, it has a rating of 98%, based on 146 reviews, with an average rating of 8.35/10. The site's consensus reads, "Mr. Robot is a suspenseful cyber-thriller with timely stories and an intriguing, provocative premise." It set a record on Rotten Tomatoes as the only show to earn perfect episode scores for an entire season since the site began tracking television episodes. On Metacritic, the first season scored 79 out of 100, based on 24 critics, indicating "generally favorable reviews".

Merrill Barr of Forbes gave it a very positive review, writing, "Mr. Robot has one of the best kick-offs to any series in a while" and that it "could be the series that finally, after years of ignorance, puts a deserving network among the likes of HBO, AMC and FX in terms of acclaim."

In The New York Times, Alessandra Stanley noted that "Occupy Wall Street, the protest movement that erupted in 2011, didn't do much to curb the financial industry. It didn't die out, though. It went Hollywood", before finding Mr. Robot to be, "an intriguing new series ... a cyber-age thriller infused with a dark, almost nihilistic pessimism about the Internet, capitalism and income inequality. And that makes it kind of fun". The UK The Daily Telegraph reviewer Michael Hogan gave the show five stars, finding it to be "The Matrix meets Fight Club meets Robin Hood", noting that, "bafflingly, it took months for a UK broadcaster to snap up the rights". Although Hogan found too much attention was devoted to Elliot's social anxiety, he eventually decided that "this alienated anti-hero was a brilliant, boldly complex character." Overall, Hogan concluded that the show deserved to find an audience in the UK.

Mr. Robot made several critics' list for the best TV shows of 2015. Three critics, Jeff Jensen of Entertainment Weekly, Rob Sheffield of Rolling Stone, and the staff of TV Guide, named it the best show of the year. The series was also placed second on the list from three other critics, and was named among the best of the year from four other critics.

==== Season 2 ====
The second season also received critical acclaim. On Rotten Tomatoes, it has a score of 90%, based on 241 reviews, with an average rating of 7.85/10. The site's consensus reads, "Unique storytelling, a darker tone, and challenging opportunities for its tight cast push Mr. Robot even further into uncharted television territory." On Metacritic, it has a score of 81 out of 100, based on 28 critics, indicating "universal acclaim".

Sonia Saraiya of Variety praised Rami Malek's performance and wrote, "It's Malek's soulful eyes and silent pathos that give Mr. Robot its unexpected warmth, as the viewer is lured into Elliot's chaos and confusion." Tim Goodman of The Hollywood Reporter lauded Sam Esmail's direction, writing "Esmail's camerawork—characters tucked into corners of the frame, among other nontraditional compositions—continues to give the sense of disorientation and never feels tired" and "there are some flourishes in the first two hours that are brilliantly conceived and [...] contribute to what is one of the most visually remarkable hours on television."

==== Season 3 ====
The third season also received critical acclaim. On Rotten Tomatoes, it has a score of 92%, based on 143 reviews, with an average rating of 8.25/10. The site's critical consensus reads, "Mr. Robot's striking visuals and bold narrative fuel its seductive blend of reality and fantasy." On Metacritic, it has a score of 82 out of 100, based on 9 critics, indicating "universal acclaim".

Based on six episodes for review, Darren Franich of Entertainment Weekly gave it an "A" grade, calling it a "noir masterpiece", and overall, wrote that "Season 3 of Mr. Robot is a masterpiece, ballasting the global ambitions of season 2 while sharpening back to the meticulous build of season 1."

==== Season 4 ====
As with previous seasons, the fourth and final season was met with critical acclaim. On Rotten Tomatoes, it has a score of 96% with an average rating of 8.95/10, based on 115 reviews. The site's critical consensus reads, "Mr. Robot returns with a thrilling final season that is sure to surprise and satisfy its audience." On Metacritic, it has a score of 81 out of 100, based on 5 critics, indicating "universal acclaim".

The episode "407 Proxy Authentication Required" specifically gained exceptional acclaim by Decider, who called it "among the best individual TV episodes of 2019, and possibly one of the best of all time." Variety listed it as the 22nd best show of the 2010s, and Emily St. James of Vox named it among "shows that help explain the decade". Emma Garland of Vice described the show as defining the 2010s and post-Occupy world as one of vast inequality: "Even if you don't buy into its earnestness, you can't argue with its bittersweet irony."

=== Audience ===
The series has gained a cult following.

==== Ratings ====
Viewership and ratings per season of Mr. Robot
Season	Timeslot (ET)	Episodes	First aired		Last aired		Avg. viewers (millions)	Avg. 18–49 rating
Season	Timeslot (ET)	Episodes	Date	Viewers (millions)	Date	Viewers (millions)	Avg. viewers (millions)	Avg. 18–49 rating
1	Wednesday 10:00 pm	10	June 24, 2015	1.75	September 2, 2015	1.21	1.39	0.48
2	Wednesday 10:00 pm	12	July 13, 2016	1.04	September 21, 2016	0.85	0.74	0.30
3	Wednesday 10:00 pm	10	October 11, 2017	0.68	December 13, 2017	0.45	0.53	0.22
4	Sunday 10:00 pm	13	October 6, 2019	0.44	December 22, 2019	0.32	0.38	0.12

== Awards and nominations ==
Year	Award	Category	Nominee(s)	Result	Ref.
2015	2015 SXSW Film Audience Award	Audience Award for Best Episodic	Mr. Robot	Won	
2015	25th Gotham Independent Film Awards	Breakthrough Series – Long Form	Mr. Robot	Won	
2015	2015 American Film Institute Awards	Television Programs of the Year	Mr. Robot	Won	
2016	42nd People's Choice Awards	Favorite Cable TV Actor	Christian Slater	Nominated	
2016	20th Satellite Awards	Best Drama Series	Mr. Robot	Nominated	
2016	20th Satellite Awards	Best Actor in a Drama Series	Rami Malek	Nominated	
2016	20th Satellite Awards	Best Supporting Actor in a Series, Miniseries or TV Film	Christian Slater	Won	
2016	68th Writers Guild of America Awards	Best Drama Series	Kyle Bradstreet, Kate Erickson, Sam Esmail, David Iserson, Randolph Leon, Adam Penn, Matt Pyken	Nominated	
2016	68th Writers Guild of America Awards	Best New Series	Kyle Bradstreet, Kate Erickson, Sam Esmail, David Iserson, Randolph Leon, Adam Penn, Matt Pyken	Won	
2016	22nd Screen Actors Guild Awards	Outstanding Performance by a Male Actor in a Drama Series	Rami Malek	Nominated	
2016	73rd Golden Globe Awards	Best Television Series – Drama	Mr. Robot	Won	
2016	73rd Golden Globe Awards	Best Actor – Television Series Drama	Rami Malek	Nominated	
2016	73rd Golden Globe Awards	Best Supporting Actor – Series, Miniseries or Television Film	Christian Slater	Won	
2016	6th Critics' Choice Television Awards	Best Drama Series	Mr. Robot	Won	
2016	6th Critics' Choice Television Awards	Best Actor in a Drama Series	Rami Malek	Won	
2016	6th Critics' Choice Television Awards	Best Supporting Actor in a Drama Series	Christian Slater	Won	
2016	6th Critics' Choice Television Awards	Best Guest Performer in a Drama Series	BD Wong	Nominated	
2016	Dorian Awards	TV Drama of the Year	Mr. Robot	Nominated	
2016	Dorian Awards	TV Performance of the Year – Actor	Rami Malek	Nominated	
2016	42nd Saturn Awards	Best Action-Thriller Television Series	Mr. Robot	Nominated	
2016	75th Peabody Awards	Peabody Award	Mr. Robot	Won	
2016	32nd TCA Awards	Program of the Year	Mr. Robot	Nominated	
2016	32nd TCA Awards	Outstanding Achievement in Drama	Mr. Robot	Nominated	
2016	32nd TCA Awards	Outstanding New Program	Mr. Robot	Won	
2016	32nd TCA Awards	Individual Achievement in Drama	Rami Malek	Nominated	
2016	68th Primetime Emmy Awards	Outstanding Drama Series	Mr. Robot	Nominated	
2016	68th Primetime Emmy Awards	Outstanding Lead Actor in a Drama Series	Rami Malek	Won	
2016	68th Primetime Emmy Awards	Outstanding Writing for a Drama Series	Sam Esmail for "eps1.0 hellofriend.mov"	Nominated	
2016	68th Primetime Emmy Awards	Outstanding Music Composition for a Series	Mac Quayle for "eps1.0 hellofriend.mov"	Won	
2016	68th Primetime Emmy Awards	Outstanding Casting for a Drama Series	Susie Farris, Beth Bowling, Kim Miscia	Nominated	
2016	68th Primetime Emmy Awards	Outstanding Sound Mixing for a Comedy or Drama Series (One-Hour)	John W. Cook II, Bill Freesh, Timothia Sellers, Andrew Morgado for "eps1.5 br4ve-trave1er.asf"	Nominated	
2016	7th Critics' Choice Television Awards	Best Drama Series	Mr. Robot	Nominated	
2016	7th Critics' Choice Television Awards	Best Actor in a Drama Series	Rami Malek	Nominated	
2016	7th Critics' Choice Television Awards	Best Supporting Actor in a Drama Series	Christian Slater	Nominated	
2017	74th Golden Globe Awards	Best Actor – Television Series Drama	Rami Malek	Nominated	
2017	74th Golden Globe Awards	Best Supporting Actor – Series, Miniseries or Television Film	Christian Slater	Nominated	
2017	23rd Screen Actors Guild Awards	Outstanding Performance by a Male Actor in a Drama Series	Rami Malek	Nominated	
2017	53rd Cinema Audio Society Awards	Outstanding Achievement in Sound Mixing for Television Series – One Hour	William Sarokin, John W. Cook II, Bill Freesh, Beaux Nyguard and Mike Marino for "eps2.8_h1dden-pr0cess.axx"	Nominated	
2017	67th ACE Eddie Awards	Best Edited One Hour Series for Commercial Television	Philip Harrison for "eps2.4m4ster-s1ave.aes"	Nominated	
2017	21st Satellite Awards	Best Drama Series	Mr. Robot	Nominated	
2017	21st Satellite Awards	Best Actor in a Drama Series	Rami Malek	Nominated	
2017	Society of Camera Operators Awards	Camera Operator of the Year – Television	Aaron Medick	Nominated	
2017	43rd Saturn Awards	Best Action/Thriller Television Series	Mr. Robot	Nominated	
2017	2017 MTV Movie & TV Awards	Best Fight Against the System	Mr. Robot	Nominated	
2017	69th Primetime Emmy Awards	Outstanding Guest Actor in a Drama Series	BD Wong	Nominated	
2017	69th Primetime Emmy Awards	Outstanding Cinematography for a Single-Camera Series (One Hour)	Tod Campbell for "eps2.0_unm4sk-pt1.tc"/"eps2.0_unm4sk-pt2.tc"	Nominated	
2017	69th Primetime Emmy Awards	Original Creative Achievement in Interactive Media within a Scripted Program	The Mr. Robot Virtual Reality Experience	Nominated	
2017	69th Primetime Emmy Awards	Outstanding Sound Mixing for a Comedy or Drama Series (One Hour)	John W. Cook II, Bill Freesh, William Sarokin, Paul Drenning for "eps2.8_h1dden-pr0cess.axx"	Nominated	
2018	75th Golden Globe Awards	Best Supporting Actor – Series, Miniseries or Television Film	Christian Slater	Nominated	
2018	8th Critics' Choice Television Awards	Best Supporting Actor in a Drama Series	Bobby Cannavale	Nominated	
2018	16th Visual Effects Society Awards	Outstanding Supporting Visual Effects in a Photoreal Episode	Ariel Altman, Lauren Montuori, John Miller, Luciano DiGeronimo for "eps3.4 runtime-error.r00"	Nominated	
2018	70th Primetime Emmy Awards	Original Creative Achievement in Interactive Media within a Scripted Program	Mr. Robot: Ecoin	Nominated	
2018	70th Primetime Emmy Awards	Outstanding Sound Mixing for a Comedy or Drama Series (One Hour)	John W. Cook II, Bill Freesh, Joe White, Paul Drenning for "eps3.4 runtime-error.r00"	Nominated	
2018	70th Primetime Emmy Awards	Outstanding Special Visual Effects in a Supporting Role	Ariel Altman, Lauren Montuori, Joe Gunn, John Miller, Brian Kubovcik, Luciano DiGeronimo, Lindsay Seguin, Greg Anderson, John-Michael Buban for "eps3.4 runtime-error.r00"	Nominated	
2020	77th Golden Globe Awards	Best Actor – Television Series Drama	Rami Malek	Nominated	
2020	70th ACE Eddie Awards	Best Edited Drama Series for Commercial Television	Rosanne Tan	Nominated	
2020	72nd Writers Guild of America Awards	Best Episodic Drama	Sam Esmail for "407 Proxy Authentication Required"	Nominated	
2020	72nd Primetime Emmy Awards	Outstanding Interactive Extension of a Linear Program	Season_4.0 ARG	Won	
2021	71st ACE Eddie Awards	Best Edited One Hour Series for Commercial Television	Rosanne Tan for "405 Method Not Allowed"	Nominated	

=== Critics' top ten lists ===
2015
- No. 1 Entertainment Weekly
- No. 1 Complex
- No. 1 Rolling Stone
- No. 1 TV Fanatic
- No. 1 TV Guide
- No. 1 NPR
- No. 2 IGN
- No. 2 TV Insider
- No. 5 Time
- No. 5 TV.com
- No. 6 Business Insider
- No. 6 The Hollywood Reporter
- No. 6 New York Post
- No. 7 Adweek
- No. 7 Uproxx
- No. 8 TheWrap
- No. 10 USA Today
- — The Atlantic
- — Associated Press
- — Maxim
- — Variety
- — Vanity Fair
- — Vogue
- — Wired

2016
- No. 3 Hidden Remote
- No. 5 Complex
- No. 6 Tulsa World
- No. 10 IndieWire
- — Newsweek

2017
- No. 3 Complex
- No. 10 Entertainment Weekly
- No. 10 PopCulture.com
- — Vox

2019
- No. 3 Complex
- No. 6 Gothamist
- No. 7 The New York Times
- No. 9 Vox
- No. 10 Little White Lies
- — The A.V. Club

== Other media ==
Mr. Robot has spawned a variety of video games. Its mobile game, titled: Mr. Robot:1.51exfiltrati0n.apk (for Android) and Mr. Robot:1.51exfiltrati0n.ipa (for iOS) are set during the first season of the series and was published by Telltale Games. Users play as a fictional character who has stumbled upon the phone of an important member of fsociety and takes it upon themselves to assist them in bringing down E Corp. The Mr. Robot Virtual Reality Experience, written and directed by Sam Esmail, is a 13-minute video viewable using virtual reality headsets that explores Elliot's past. Mr. Robot also features several Easter eggs, including websites related to the show or IP addresses used within the series that redirect to real websites.

A book tie-in, Mr. Robot: Red Wheelbarrow (eps1.91_redwheelbarr0w.txt) written by Esmail and Courtney Looney, was released on November 1, 2016.

== Release ==
=== Broadcast ===
Mr. Robot premiered in the United States on USA Network on June 24, 2015, and in Canada on Showcase on September 4, 2015. Before USA Network's broadcast release, the pilot had a "pre-release" with a live stream on Twitch on May 27, 2015. USA Network's partnership with Twitch continued with a live stream starting on June 16, 2015, where the in-universe group "fsociety" broadcast them "hacking" Mr. Robot's Twitch account and sending cash prizes through PayPal to viewers under the guise of "cancelling $100k in consumer debt". The broadcast continued until June 24, during which viewers could watch the pilot on various streaming services before the official broadcast. Amazon.com secured international broadcasting rights in the United Kingdom, with the first season added on Amazon Prime on October 16, 2015, and second-season episodes to be released immediately after initial broadcast in the United States. In Australia, the series premiered on Presto on August 14, 2015. After Presto shut down, the series moved to Fox Showcase for its third season and to Foxtel On Demand for the fourth season. The show aired in the Republic of Ireland on TG4.

=== Home media ===
Universal Pictures Home Entertainment released all four seasons on DVD and Blu-ray. The first season was released on January 12, 2016. It contains all 10 episodes, plus deleted scenes, gag reel, making-of featurette, and UltraViolet digital copies of the episodes. The second season was released on January 10, 2017. The third season was released on March 27, 2018, in the United States. The fourth season as well as a complete series collection was released on March 31, 2020.

In September 2015, Amazon.com acquired exclusive streaming VOD rights to Mr. Robot in several countries. The first season became available to stream in June 2016 for U.S. Amazon Prime subscribers. The series left Amazon in October 2024. It became available on Netflix in July 2025.
