= Azhar Khan (actor) =

Indian American actor and comedian

Azhar Khan (born January 7, 1984) is an Indian-American actor, writer, guitarist, and multimedia artist, best known for playing Mobley in Mr. Robot, as well as numerous character roles in television and film. Vox culture writer Caroline Framke called his work on Mr. Robot "wonderful and understated." The reclusive Khan, who lives in New York City with his wife, has also performed extensively in Off-Broadway theatre as well as stand-up, sketch, and improv comedy. He plays guitar and electronics in the bands Flea Circus, Meryl Shriek, The Dead Romeos, and Khanflesh.
