= Frankie Shaw =

American actress, writer and director (born 1981 or 1982)

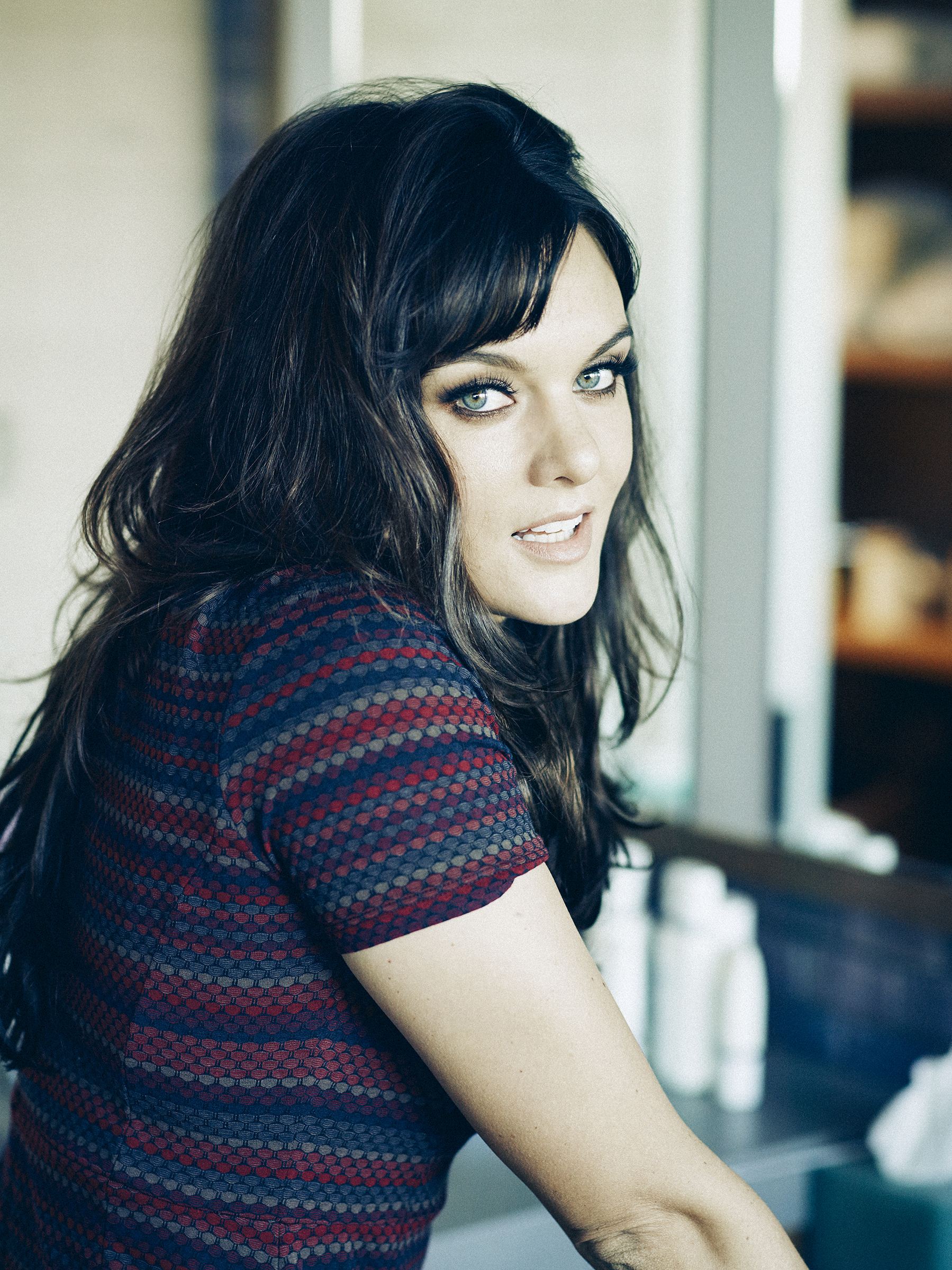
- Shaw in 2015
- Born: Rachel Frances Shaw; 1981 or 1982 (age 43–44); Boston, Massachusetts, U.S.
- Education: Barnard College
- Occupations: Actress; screenwriter; director
- Years active: 2005–present
- Spouse: Zach Strauss (m. 2016)
- Children: 1

Rachel Frances Shaw (born 1981 or 1982) is an American actress, writer and director. She is best known for playing Bridgette Bird on the Showtime series SMILF, based on the 2015 short film of the same title, which she wrote, directed and starred in. Shaw is also known for playing Mary Jo Cacciatore on the 2010–2011 Spike TV series Blue Mountain State, and her recurring role as Shayla Nico in the first season of the USA Network television series Mr. Robot.

== Early life and education ==
Shaw was born in South Boston, and also grew up in Brookline, Massachusetts. Her mother was from South Boston. Shaw's parents divorced when she was four years old. She grew up in a single-mother home with an older half-brother, who owns a bar in Boston.

Shaw attended Michael Driscoll School and Brookline High School. At Michael Driscoll, Shaw played full court streetball at a nearby neighborhood park. Shaw said that basketball was a constant of her childhood, and she incorporated it into the pilot and third episode of SMILF. After receiving a scholarship in her junior year, Shaw transferred to the private school Milton Academy in Milton, Massachusetts, where she graduated in 2000. In 2007, she graduated from Barnard College with a degree in literature.

== Career ==
After college, Shaw decided to move to Los Angeles, but discovered she was pregnant. Much of her struggles to work as an actor while being a single mother are the loose inspiration for SMILF. A role in the 2014 ABC ensemble series Mixology was a breakout role, providing Shaw with her first sense of financial stability since giving birth to her son.

In 2009, Shaw first received recognition in the completely improvised Katie Aselton-directed film The Freebie and then as the oddball drunken cheerleader Mary Jo Cacciatore in the 2010 sitcom Blue Mountain State.

In 2013, Shaw appeared in the HBO's TV series starring Stephen Merchant called Hello Ladies. She had roles in the 2013 independent film The Pretty One, which starred Zoe Kazan and Jake Johnson, and the 2014 romantic comedy film Someone Marry Barry. Also in 2014, Shaw appeared in another independent feature, the drama Lullaby, which starred Garrett Hedlund and Amy Adams.

In 2015, Shaw had a recurring role on the first season of the television series Mr. Robot as Shayla Nico, the drug dealing love interest of Elliot Alderson, for seven episodes.

In 2015, she appeared in the ABC Family pilot Tough Cookie as well as on the 2015 Fox TV series Mulaney. In 2016, Shaw reprised her role of Mary Jo Cacciatore from the 2010 series in the movie Blue Mountain State: The Rise of Thadland. Also in 2016, Shaw appeared in the Netflix series Flaked. She was a series regular on the 2016 TV series Good Girls Revolt.

Shaw's 2014 short film SMILF, which she wrote, directed and starred in opposite Thomas Middleditch, won the 2015 Short Film Jury Award for U.S. Fiction at Sundance. In 2015, SMILF was picked up by Showtime as a half-hour comedy television show with Shaw as showrunner, writing, directing, starring in, and producing the series. The first season, which was shot on location in South Boston as well as Los Angeles, received generally positive reviews, with her portrayal of single mother Bridgette Bird notable for its realism, insight, and biting humor. "Frankie Shaw, it [SMILF] marks the arrival of an important and original voice." SMILF co-stars Connie Britton and Rosie O'Donnell, and tackles subjects like eating disorders and sexual abuse. Shaw said that the show was a way to discuss and portray the role of women on screen. In November 2017, Showtime renewed SMILF for a second season. In December 2018, it was reported that Shaw and the series had been accused of workplace misconduct. In March 2019, the series was cancelled after two seasons.

In 2016, Shaw returned to the Sundance Film Festival with another short film she wrote and directed, a dark comedy titled Too Legit, which stars Zoë Kravitz, Teresa Palmer, Nate Corddry and Clark Gregg. Too Legit is inspired by a satire of Congressman Todd Akin's controversial 2012 remarks about rape and pregnancy: "It seems to be, first of all, from what I understand from doctors, [rape resulting in pregnancy is] really rare. If it's a legitimate rape, the female body has ways to try to shut the whole thing down."

In 2017, Shaw had a supporting role as Gail Hurley in the feature film Stronger, which was directed by David Gordon Green, and starred Jake Gyllenhaal as 2013 Boston Marathon bombing survivor Jeff Bauman.

=== Prospective projects ===
In 2019, Shaw was attached to direct an adaption of the Katherine Faw Morris novel Ultraluminous, produced by Steven Soderbergh. In 2020, numerous announcements were made regarding projects Shaw is attached to: she is reported to be writer and executive producer of an HBO series adapting the 1978 Judy Blume novel Wifey, and will direct the first episode; she is reportedly to star in Kill Switch, a film to be directed by Soderbergh; and she is attached to direct an adaption of T Kira Madden's memoir Long Live the Tribe of Fatherless Girls. She is also set to direct a film adaptation of the comic 4 Kids Walk Into a Bank.

== Personal life ==
In August 2016, Shaw married writer–producer Zach Strauss.

Shaw has a son, Isaac Love, from a prior relationship with director and actor Mark Webber. Shaw and Webber share joint custody of Isaac.

== Filmography ==
=== Film ===
Year	Title	Role	Notes
2005	Night Swimming	Amber	
2006	Just Like the Son	Brenda	
2007	One Night	Clarice	
2008	Explicit Ills	Michelle	
2008	Altamont Now	Karen Kennedy	
2009	The Northern Kingdom	Shauna	
2009	Falling Up	Gretchen	
2009	Red Hook	Deena	
2010	The Freebie	Coffee Girl	
2011	Coffee Snobs	Customer	Short film
2011	The End of Love	Evelyn	
2012	Spoonful	Mac	Short film
2012	Knife Fight	Samantha	
2013	The Pretty One	Claudia	
2013	This Is Where We Live	Lainey	
2014	Lullaby	Janice	
2014	Someone Marry Barry	Camille	
2014	SMILF	Bridgette Bird	Short film; also writer and director
2016	Too Legit	Jess	Short film; also writer and director
2016	Joshy	Crystal	
2016	Blue Mountain State: The Rise of Thadland	Mary Jo Cacciatore	
2016	Dreamland	Lizzie	
2016	Tough Cookie	Heidi	Short film
2017	Stronger	Gail Hurley	
2017	Bad Peter	Rachel	Short film
2018	Fluidic	Emlyn	
2019	Jay and Silent Bob Reboot	Prosecutor	
2021	No Sudden Move	Paula Cole	
2024	Absolution	Daisy	
2027	4 Kids Walk Into a Bank	—N/a	Director, writer, and producer

=== Television ===
Year	Title	Role	Notes
2005	Law & Order: Criminal Intent	Marrissa	Episode: "Unchained" (season 5, episode 4)
2006	The Bedford Diaries	Simone	Episode: "I'm Gonna Love College" (season 1, episode 1)
2010–2011	Blue Mountain State	Mary Jo Cacciatore	Main role (seasons 2–3), 15 episodes
2011	Glory Daze	Gina	Episode: "Hit Me with Your Test Shot" (season 1, episode 9)
2011	CSI: NY	Kelly Rose	Episode: "Brooklyn Til I Die" (season 8, episode 12)
2011	2 Broke Girls	Keefer	Episode: "And the High Holidays" (season 2, episode 12)
2013	Hello Ladies	Nikki	Episode: "The Limo" (season 1, episode 2)
2014	Mixology	Fabienne	Main role
2015	Mulaney	Julia	Episode: "Ruby" (season 1, episode 12)
2015	Tough Cookie	Heidi	Episode: "Pilot" (season 1, episode 1)
2015	Mr. Robot	Shayla Nico	Recurring role (season 1), 7 episodes
2016	Flaked	Natasha	2 episodes
2016	Good Girls Revolt	Naomi	8 episodes
2017–2019	SMILF	Bridgette Bird	Lead role; also creator, director, producer, and writer
2018	Homecoming	Dara	4 episodes
2018	Hollyweed	Brookline Mass / Janet	Online pilot
2019	Drunk History	Hedy Lamarr	Episode: "Fame" (season 6, episode 11)
2019	Robot Chicken	Dorothy Gale / Oopsie Starlight	Voice role; episode: "Molly Lucero in: Your Friend's Boob"

== Awards and nominations ==
Year	Association	Category	Nominated work	Result
2015	Sundance Film Festival	Short Film Grand Jury Prize	SMILF (short film)	Nominated
2015	Sundance Film Festival	Short Film Jury Award for U.S. Fiction	SMILF (short film)	Won
2016	Sundance Film Festival	Short Film Grand Jury Prize	Too Legit (short film)	Nominated
2016	South by Southwest Film Festival	SXSW Grand Jury Award for Narrative Short	Too Legit (short film)	—
2016	American Film Institute	Conservatory Directing Workshop for Women	—	—
2017	Writers Guild of America	Showrunner Training Program	—	—
2017	Golden Globe Awards	Golden Globe Award for Best Actress – Television Series Musical or Comedy	SMILF	Nominated
