= Eps2.0 unm4sk-pt2.tc =

"eps2.0_unm4sk-pt2.tc"
- Mr. Robot episode
- Episode no.: Season 2 Episode 2
- Directed by: Sam Esmail
- Written by: Sam Esmail
- Cinematography by: Tod Campbell
- Editing by: Franklin Peterson
- Original release date: July 13, 2016
- Running time: 42 minutes

Guest appearances
- Michel Gill as Gideon Goddard; Sakina Jaffrey as Antara Nayar; Brian Stokes Mitchell as Scott Knowles; Joey Badass as Leon; Jeremy Holm as Donald "Mr. Sutherland" Hoffman; Chris Conroy as Derek; Olivia Washington as FBI Agent; Craig Robinson as Ray Heyworth

Episode chronology
← Previous "eps2.0 unm4sk-pt1.tc"	Next → "eps2.1 k3rnel-pan1c.ksd"

"eps2.0_unm4sk-pt2.tc" is the second episode of the second season of the American drama thriller television series Mr. Robot. It is the twelfth overall episode of the series and was written and directed by series creator Sam Esmail. It originally aired on USA Network on July 13, 2016, airing back-to-back with the previous episode, "eps2.0 unm4sk-pt1.tc".

The series follows Elliot Alderson, a cybersecurity engineer and hacker with social anxiety disorder, who is recruited by an insurrectionary anarchist known as "Mr. Robot" to join a group of hacktivists called "fsociety". In the episode, Elliot is approached by a neighbor, while E Corp faces severe repercussions.

According to Nielsen Media Research, the episode was seen by an estimated 1.04 million household viewers and gained a 0.4 ratings share among adults aged 18–49. The episode received extremely positive reviews from critics, who praised the performances, intrigue and surprises.

== Plot ==
At a park, Scott (Brian Stokes Mitchell) arrives with the money, while a security intel is nearby. A biker approaches him to deliver a backpack before driving off. The backpack contains a lighter and an fsociety masks that reads "Wear me. And then burn the money." His phone rings, and he is warned that he has ten seconds to do the instructions or the clients' records will be deleted. He quickly goes forward and lights the money on fire, shocked. Darlene (Carly Chaikin) is revealed to be in the crowd, and leaves.

In Washington, D.C., Price (Michael Cristofer) tries to get a bailout from the National Economic Council. His request is denied, and the congressmen suggest he should resign from his position. He refuses, as it will alarm the public that things are worsening. Gideon (Michel Gill) meets with Federal Bureau of Investigation Agent Dominique DiPierro (Grace Gummer) and expresses concern over the attack. Angela (Portia Doubleday) now works as a PR manager for E Corp, helping them to keep incriminating events from the headlines.

As they watch a basketball game, Leon (Joey Badass) almost gets into a fight with a player, until they are separated by a man, Ray (Craig Robinson). Leon leaves, and Ray converses with Elliot (Rami Malek). While Ray wants to establish a friendship, Elliot makes it clear he is not interested.

Joanna (Stephanie Corneliussen) is seeing a man, Derek (Chris Conroy), to continue having sex even though she does not want to be seen in public with him. While returning home, she finds a gift on her doorstep, a music box with a phone hidden underneath. While tending her baby, the phone rings but she is unable to answer.

At a bar, Gideon is approached by a man named Brock. Brock tries to seduce him, only to insult him. He then pulls out a gun and kills Gideon in front of the patrons. During another encounter, Ray talks with Elliot about a conversation they had the previous night. This confuses Elliot, as he didn't leave the house during the night. Checking his journal, he finds that Mr. Robot (Christian Slater) could influence his actions while sleeping. He attends a church group meeting, only to wake up back at home holding a phone. When he asks to whom he is talking about, the person is revealed to be Tyrell (Martin Wallström).

== Production ==
=== Development ===
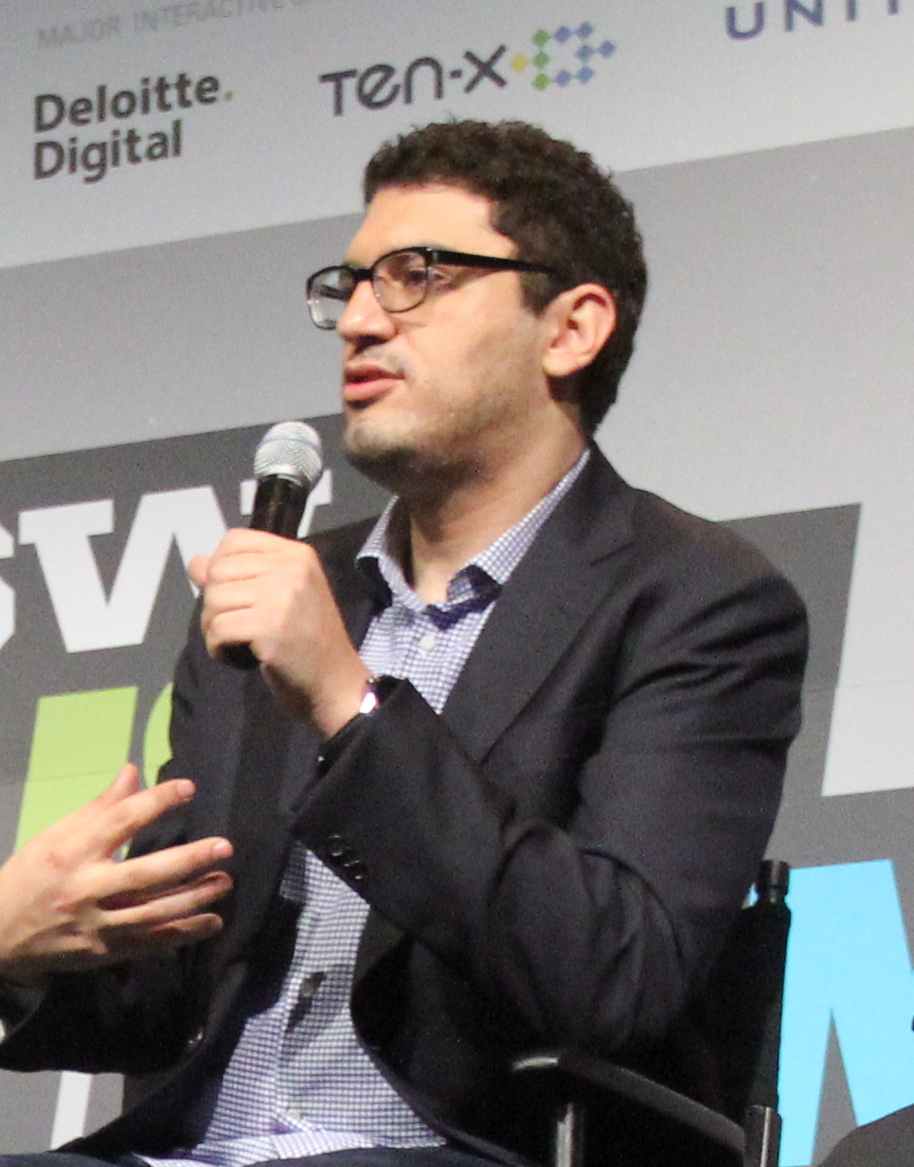
Sam Esmail

In July 2016, USA Network announced that the second episode of the season would be titled "eps2.0_unm4sk-pt2.tc". The episode was written and directed by series creator Sam Esmail. This was Esmail's seventh writing credit, and fifth directing credit.

== Reception ==
=== Viewers ===
In its original American broadcast, "eps2.0_unm4sk-pt2.tc" was seen by an estimated 1.04 million household viewers with a 0.4 in the 18-49 demographics. This means that 0.4 percent of all households with televisions watched the episode. This was even in viewership from the previous episode, which was watched by an estimated 1.04 million household viewers with a 0.4 in the 18-49 demographics.

=== Critical reviews ===
"eps2.0_unm4sk-pt2.tc" received extremely positive reviews from critics. Matt Fowler of IGN gave the episode a "great" 8 out of 10 and wrote in his verdict, "Mr. Robot's two-episode premiere focused heavily on Elliot's attempt to hide from his damaged psyche while also introducing new characters and showing us some of the true fallout from the E Corp hack. The series snuggles up to Fight Club even more with the reveal that the aggressive side of Elliot's mind has now gone into business for itself but this season has to be careful as conversations between a hero and an imaginary character can easily grow tiresome and/or devolve into cliche."

Alex McLevy of The A.V. Club gave the episode a "B+" grade and wrote, "Elliot may not have pulled the trigger, but he watched Gideon die. And then Gideon died. That's what we saw. And as season one made clear, we're inextricably tied to Elliot's point of view. Yet we still know things that Elliot doesn't, none more pressing than that mysterious meeting with Grace Gummer's character and Gideon. Are we seeing the narrative that Elliot has planned? Or have we not earned that trust yet? Neither Elliot, nor we, can say for sure."

Alan Sepinwall of HitFix wrote, "There are two wars being waged in the series right now: Elliot vs. Mr. Robot, and fsociety vs. Evil Corp. 'Unmask' suggests both are only just getting started." Jeff Jensen of Entertainment Weekly wrote, "The Mr. Robot premiere was compelling when it dealt with Elliot, slightly less so when it dealt with other characters and subplots. I'm not sure I like the idea of keeping Elliot and Darlene and Elliot and Angela separated from each other for too long. Without them in relationship, the show loses emotional resonance and requisite grounding."

Genevieve Koski of Vulture gave the episode a 4 star rating out of 5 and wrote, "No one would accuse Mr. Robot of being subtle, but biblical recitation in the closing moments is super-mega-ultra-unsubtle. The alpha and the omega? The beginning and the end? God and son? Yeah, this all checks out." Alec Bojalad of Den of Geek wrote, "On the whole, we still don’t know where Tyrell Wellick is and we still don't know who was knocking on Elliot's door at the end of season one. And that's fine for now. Mr. Robot is focused on getting everything in place for a season that will hopefully stand on its own. It just can't forget to keep bringing the style as it works its way through the substance."
