= Eps1.6 v1ew-s0urce.flv =

"eps1.6_v1ew-s0urce.flv"
- Mr. Robot episode
- Episode no.: Season 1 Episode 7
- Directed by: Sam Esmail
- Written by: Kate Erickson
- Cinematography by: Tod Campbell
- Editing by: Philip Harrison
- Original release date: August 5, 2015
- Running time: 45 minutes

Guest appearances
- Gloria Reuben as Dr. Krista Gordon; Michel Gill as Gideon Goddard; Michele Hicks as Sharon Knowles; Brian Stokes Mitchell as Scott Knowles; Sakina Jaffrey as Antara Nayar; Bruce Altman as Terry Colby; Frankie Shaw as Shayla Nico; Ben Rappaport as Ollie Parker; Michael Drayer as Francis "Cisco" Shaw; Michael Cristofer as Phillip Price; Ron Cephas Jones as Leslie Romero; Stephanie Corneliussen as Joanna Wellick; Sunita Mani as Shama "Trenton" Biswas

Episode chronology
| ← Previous "eps1.5 br4ve-trave1er.asf" | Next → "eps1.7 wh1ter0se.m4v" |

"eps1.6_v1ew-s0urce.flv" is the seventh episode of the American drama thriller television series Mr. Robot. The episode was written by Kate Erickson and directed by series creator Sam Esmail. It originally aired on USA Network on August 5, 2015.

The series follows Elliot Alderson, a cybersecurity engineer and hacker with social anxiety disorder, who is recruited by an insurrectionary anarchist known as "Mr. Robot" to join a group of hacktivists called "fsociety". In the episode, Elliot abandons therapy, while Mr. Robot tries to get fsociety once again involved.

According to Nielsen Media Research, the episode was seen by an estimated 1.15 million household viewers and gained a 0.5 ratings share among adults aged 18–49. The episode received mostly positive reviews from critics, who praised the focus on characters and ending scene.

== Plot ==
In a flashback, Elliot (Rami Malek) arrives at his apartment, where he meets his new neighbor, Shayla (Frankie Shaw). He helps her in arranging her apartment, and she also provides him with suboxone when she notices his addiction. Wanting to be his friend, Shayla allows him to keep her pet fish.

In the present, one month has passed since Shayla's murder. While Elliot’s court-mandated therapy sessions are over, Krista (Gloria Reuben) still wants him to attend, but he declines. Gideon (Michel Gill) also offers Elliot some days off from work, but Elliot declines the offer. Antara (Sakina Jaffrey) tells Angela (Portia Doubleday) that Colby (Bruce Altman) will accept a meeting now that he was granted a witness immunity, but he wants the meeting to be at his house and only wants Angela to attend. Colby does not want to testify as a witness, but is persuaded by Angela when he realizes that not getting involved will make him lose support among the public, and Angela promises to lie about breaking the chain of custody with the file.

When Darlene (Carly Chaikin) informs him that the Dark Army won't help, Mr. Robot (Christian Slater) decides to visit Romero (Ron Cephas Jones) to get him back to fsociety, which he achieves by threatening him with a gun. After finally getting a meeting with the Dark Army's leader, Whiterose, Darlene convinces Trenton (Sunita Mani) to return. Cisco (Michael Drayer) corners Ollie (Ben Rappaport), telling him he is on the Dark Army's payroll now that they have evidence that his computer installed malware.

Tyrell (Martin Wallström) and Joanna (Stephanie Corneliussen) attend a party where Scott (Brian Stokes Mitchell) is named CTO by Phillip Price (Michael Cristofer). Tyrell seduces Sharon (Michele Hicks), and they kiss on the building’s rooftop. However, Tyrell strangles her until she loses consciousness. He is shaken to discover that she died, and leaves the rooftop.

Although having decided to abandon therapy earlier, Elliot once again visits Krista. He confesses that he lied about everything, and states that he is involved in hacking everyone around him, including Krista herself, and views this as a way to get out of loneliness.

== Production ==
=== Development ===
In July 2015, USA Network announced that the seventh episode of the season would be titled "eps1.6_v1ew-s0urce.flv". The episode was written by Kate Erickson and directed by series creator Sam Esmail. This was Erickson's first writing credit, and Esmail's second directing credit.

== Reception ==
=== Viewers ===
In its original American broadcast, "eps1.6_v1ew-s0urce.flv" was seen by an estimated 1.15 million household viewers with a 0.5 in the 18-49 demographics. This means that 0.5 percent of all households with televisions watched the episode. This was a 8% decrease in viewership from the previous episode, which was watched by an estimated 1.25 million household viewers with a 0.4 in the 18-49 demographics.

=== Critical reviews ===
"eps1.6_v1ew-s0urce.flv" received mostly positive reviews from critics. The review aggregator website Rotten Tomatoes reported a 100% approval rating for the episode, based on 7 reviews.

Amy Ratcliffe of IGN gave the episode a "great" 8.3 out of 10 and wrote in her verdict, "Mr. Robot continues to be an emotional ride. At times I've considered the pace slow, but now, I'd call it more thoughtful. The net of the story is spreading wider, and I look forward to seeing how paths converge."

Alex McLevy of The A.V. Club gave the episode a "B–" grade and wrote, "You don't want to live with the blame of hurting those who meant the most to you — to co-opt Angela's most honest line, it's a shitty feeling. And until Elliot acknowledges that grief, it will tear away at his life. It will tear away at those around him. He'll tear into the social fabric, like he does with his therapist, and unless he sees it for what it is, it will get worse. Given the already ambiguous state of Elliot Alderson's mind, I'm not sure anyone can handle that." Samantha Sofka of Nerdist wrote, "Having an unreliable, drug-reliant, and mentally ill protagonist as the narrator tends to do that to you. Things might have become a bit clearer, though, in the wake of Shayla's death. This week's episode, while not as suspenseful, was shocking in its own way."

Kevin P. Sullivan of Entertainment Weekly wrote, "Coming down from the shock of last week's ending, the latest episode of Mr. Robot managed to be just as powerful — and possibly more so — in a much quieter way, beginning with a bitter sweet cold open." Matthew Giles of Vulture gave the episode a perfect 5 star rating out of 5 and wrote, "Elliot and Angela were asked what they wanted during this week's episode, and while one character turned that question into something to act upon, the other is stuck in the wilderness, groping his way to the answer."

Frances Roberts of Den of Geek wrote, "It's testament to the strength of its supporting characters' storylines that things didn't fall apart without our lead. Mr Robot needs to have more than just style and one great performance if it's going to flourish beyond its impressive freshman year. View Source was a strong indicator that it'll be capable of doing just that." Caralynn Lippo of TV Fanatic a 4.4 star rating out of 5 and wrote, "It consistently amazes me how well Mr. Robot manages to keep up its fantastic momentum without each episode seeming overstuffed. This episode was no exception. In the wake of Shayla's upsetting death, I had erroneously assumed that there would be a slower, more introspective hour of the show to follow that high-tension in the previous episode. And it certainly was relatively slower. Until, you know, that whole murder thing in the last third."
