= Eps1.9 zer0-day.avi =

"eps1.9_zer0-day.avi"
- Mr. Robot episode
- In the wake of the hack on E Corp, protestors rally in the streets in support of fsociety.
- Episode no.: Season 1 Episode 10
- Directed by: Sam Esmail
- Written by: Sam Esmail
- Cinematography by: Tod Campbell
- Editing by: Philip Harrison
- Original release date: September 2, 2015
- Running time: 54 minutes

Guest appearances
- Gloria Reuben as Dr. Krista Gordon; Michel Gill as Gideon Goddard; Michael Cristofer as Phillip Price; Ron Cephas Jones as Leslie Romero; Susan Pourfar as Penelope; Armand Schultz as Lenny Shannon; BD Wong as Whiterose; Stephanie Corneliussen as Joanna Wellick; Richard Bekins as James Plouffe; Azhar Khan as Sunil "Mobley" Markesh; Sunita Mani as Shama "Trenton" Biswas

Episode chronology
← Previous "eps1.8 m1rr0r1ng.qt"	Next → "eps2.0 unm4sk-pt1.tc"

"eps1.9_zer0-day.avi" is the tenth episode and first-season finale of the American drama thriller television series Mr. Robot. The episode was written and directed by series creator Sam Esmail. It originally aired on USA Network on September 2, 2015. The episode was originally scheduled to air on August 26, 2015, but was delayed one week due to the murders of Alison Parker and Adam Ward, which took the place on the original planned date, as the episode contained a scene with similarities to the event.

The series follows Elliot Alderson, a cybersecurity engineer and hacker with social anxiety disorder, who is recruited by an insurrectionary anarchist known as "Mr. Robot" to join a group of hacktivists called "fsociety". In the episode, Elliot finds himself with amnesia, after the fsociety hack succeeded.

According to Nielsen Media Research, the episode was seen by an estimated 1.21 million household viewers and gained a 0.5 ratings share among adults aged 18–49. The episode received critical acclaim, with critics praising the episode's set-up for the second season and performances.

== Plot ==
At a restaurant, Krista (Gloria Reuben) dines with Lenny (Armand Schultz). (Note: Krista's ex-boyfriend whom Elliot hacked and blackmailed in "eps1.0 hellofriend.mov".) He lied about being diagnosed with cancer just so he could meet her again. He reveals that Elliot hacked him and already reported it to the police, as Elliot took his dog, which was microchipped. He wants her to reveal anything about him from his sessions, but she refuses to help him. Lenny returns to his apartment, where he watches a news report about riots across the world as the economy is collapsing.

Elliot (Rami Malek) wakes up in a SUV, which he recognizes as belonging to Tyrell. He returns to fsociety's hideout, where Darlene (Carly Chaikin) tells him he was missing for three days and the hack succeeded, even though he has no memory of the past days. As they are now targeted by the media, they are destroying any evidence of their tracks. fsociety broadcasts a message where they take credit for the attack, claiming that they have freed the world, causing crowds across New York City to cheer.

Elliot visits Tyrell's house, only to find Joanna (Stephanie Corneliussen) and her child. He introduces himself as "Ollie", discovering that Tyrell has not been home ever since his talk with Joanna at the hospital. James Plouffe (Richard Bekins), E Corp's executive vice president for Tech, participates in an interview to ease down on questions regarding the attack. However, he is shocked when the interviewer reveals that fsociety's attack was so massive to the point that E Corp's data is all gone, with no chance of recovering it and E Corp's stocks are dropping. Plouffe finally admits that everyone should be worried and that there is no chance of fixing it. He then pulls out a gun, and kills himself on live television. This traumatizes Angela (Portia Doubleday), as she witnessed it in close proximity, but Price (Michael Cristofer) sees it as an opportunity to move forward.

Checking Tyrell's SUV, Elliot discovers a USB flash drive containing footage of an encounter with Mr. Robot (Christian Slater), highlighting that Elliot was always alone. He then decides to call the police to surrender, prompting Mr. Robot to appear. He fights with Mr. Robot, who states he does not know anything that Elliot does not know. Mr. Robot then drags Elliot through the street, which is filled with protestors wearing fsociety masks. When Elliot demands to be left alone, Mr. Robot tells him they are together by this and tells him to go back home. At his apartment, Elliot hears someone knocking and opens the door.

In a post-credits scene, Whiterose (BD Wong), dressed as a man, visits Price at a club. As they discuss about the latter's recent problems, Price states that he knows who is responsible and will handle it.

== Production ==
=== Development ===
In August 2015, USA Network announced that the tenth episode of the season would be titled "eps1.9_zer0-day.avi". The episode was written and directed by series creator Sam Esmail. This was Esmail's fifth writing credit, and third directing credit.

== Reception ==
=== Viewers ===
In its original American broadcast, "eps1.9_zer0-day.avi" was seen by an estimated 1.21 million household viewers with a 0.5 in the 18-49 demographics. This means that 0.5 percent of all households with televisions watched the episode. This was a 9% decrease in viewership from the previous episode, which was watched by an estimated 1.32 million household viewers with a 0.5 in the 18-49 demographics.

=== Critical reviews ===
"eps1.9_zer0-day.avi" received critical acclaim. The review aggregator website Rotten Tomatoes reported an 100% approval rating for the episode, based on 17 reviews. The site's consensus states: "Having answered many of season one's questions in the penultimate episode, Mr. Robot raises the stakes for season two with 'eps1.9_zer0-day.avi,' a disorienting finale that eerily bleeds into real-life events."

Amy Ratcliffe of IGN gave the episode a "great" 8.7 out of 10 and wrote in her verdict, "Mr. Robot wrapped its first season by completing the mission introduced in the pilot. Hacking Evil Corp became secondary to getting to know the characters though - especially Elliot. The finale showed both how much we know and how much we're in the dark, and Mr. Robot excels at leaning into that balance."

Alex McLevy of The A.V. Club gave the episode a "B+" grade and wrote, "It's the end product of a thousand external influences, all changing us in immeasurable ways. By trying to save the world, we're only ever trying to save ourselves. And when we no longer know who we are, it's impossible to know if we're on the side of good."

Alan Sepinwall of HitFix wrote, "What a fascinating, off-kilter, 100% Mr. Robot way to end this season." Samantha Sofka of Nerdist wrote, "As season finales typically do, episode 10 'zer0-day.avi' tied up several loose ends while simultaneously leaving some open or splitting others we thought we'd seen the end of, in advance of season two."

Kevin P. Sullivan of Entertainment Weekly wrote, "So with the truth about Mr. Robot and Elliot's mental state out in the open, 'eps1.9_zer0-day.avi' was able to look forward to what's next, and as a preview of season 2, the hour suggests that the hack on Evil Corp was only the beginning." Matthew Giles of Vulture gave the episode a 4 star rating out of 5 and wrote, "Elliot's final scene in the season-one finale of Mr. Robot is the most logical conclusion to an episode largely focused on setting the stage for season two."

Frances Roberts of Den of Geek wrote, "Zero Day may not have given many decisive answers, but it did provide a satisfying sense that everything on this show is done for a reason. The finale revealed the deeper significance of past events that seemed throwaway at first, all of which points towards the sure and capable hand guiding Mr Robot, which is really all TV audiences ask for from mystery storytelling." Caralynn Lippo of TV Fanatic a 4.85 star rating out of 5 and wrote, "'Zero Day', the tenth episode and season finale, capped off an incredible freshman run for the summer hit Mr. Robot. The writers managed to pull off expected plot developments in interesting, unexpected ways, and leave the door open for a plethora of exciting possibilities for season two storylines."
