= Eps2.2 init 1.asec =

"eps2.2_init_1.asec"
- Mr. Robot episode
- Episode no.: Season 2 Episode 4
- Directed by: Sam Esmail
- Written by: Sam Esmail
- Cinematography by: Tod Campbell
- Editing by: John Petaja
- Original release date: July 27, 2016
- Running time: 65 minutes

Guest appearances
- Gloria Reuben as Dr. Krista Gordon; Azhar Khan as Sunil "Mobley" Markesh; Sunita Mani as Shama "Trenton" Biswas; Joey Badass as Leon; Michael Drayer as Francis "Cisco" Shaw; Jordan Gelber as FBI Agent; Omar Metwally as Ernesto Santiago; Brian Stokes Mitchell as Scott Knowles; Sakina Jaffrey as Antara Nayar; BD Wong as Whiterose; Vaishnavi Sharma as Magda Alderson; Michael Maize as "Lone Star" Lockwood; Tom Riis Farrell as Bill Harper; Chris Conroy as Derek; Olivia Washington as FBI Agent; Aaron Takahashi as Lloyd Chong; Jeremy Holm as Donald "Mr. Sutherland" Hoffman; Craig Robinson as Ray Heyworth

Episode chronology
← Previous "eps2.1 k3rnel-pan1c.ksd"	Next → "eps2.3 logic-b0mb.hc"

"eps2.2_init_1.asec" is the fourth episode of the second season of the American drama thriller television series Mr. Robot. It is the fourteenth overall episode of the series and was written and directed by series creator Sam Esmail. It originally aired on USA Network on July 27, 2016.

The series follows Elliot Alderson, a cybersecurity engineer and hacker with social anxiety disorder, who is recruited by an insurrectionary anarchist known as "Mr. Robot" to join a group of hacktivists called "fsociety". In the episode, Darlene asks Elliot for his help, while the FBI investigates the arcade.

According to Nielsen Media Research, the episode was seen by an estimated 0.637 million household viewers and gained a 0.3 ratings share among adults aged 18–49. The episode received extremely positive reviews from critics, praising the performances and tension, but criticizing its runtime and pacing.

== Plot ==
On Halloween of the previous year, Darlene (Carly Chaikin) visits Elliot (Rami Malek). They catch up during movie night, with Elliot saying he got fired a few months ago after a violent fight and he is now forced to go to therapy. Inspired by a mask she brought, he wears their father's jacket and opens up about hacking E Corp, intriguing Darlene.

In present day, Elliot is visited by Darlene, who asks for his help with fsociety. When he refuses, she asks to see Mr. Robot (Christian Slater) instead. Later, Elliot visits Ray (Craig Robinson), who gives him a chessboard. Mr. Robot then offers a deal; they will play chess and if Elliot wins, Mr. Robot goes away. Elliot is conflicted on what to do, with Krista (Gloria Reuben) telling him not to accept it, while Leon (Joey Badass) tells him to fight for what he wants.

The FBI is investigating the arcade, with the agents finding that the "End of the World Party" was on social media. Dominique (Grace Gummer) then discovers a piece of evidence: a bullet casing retrieved in the arcade. Cisco (Michael Drayer) informs Darlene about their discovery. He urges her in getting Elliot back, but she refuses to get him involved. After having sex, Cisco states that the Dark Army couldn't have been involved in Romero's death, as he was investigating an illegal FBI surveillance program called Project Berenstain.

Joanna (Stephanie Corneliussen) is informed that her funds are running low and that Tyrell's severance package has been withheld, as he had to pay the parking attendant who found Tyrell's SUV during the hack to stay quiet. Desperate, she meets with Scott (Brian Stokes Mitchell). She offers to frame Tyrell for his wife's murder if Scott gives her his severance package, but he refuses. With the information that Price (Michael Cristofer) provided, Angela (Portia Doubleday) decides to submit the evidence, leading to the arrest of the two E Corp executives. Nevertheless, she assumes Price wants her to help settle the class action lawsuit over the toxic leak, but he rebuffs her theory. Whiterose (BD Wong) pressures Price to stay on schedule and receives information about the FBI's investigation into the arcade.

Elliot decides to play chess with Mr. Robot. However, the game ends in three stalemates, and Mr. Robot declares he cannot continue avoiding any of this. Elliot accepts Darlene's plea for help, despite Mr. Robot's protests. He also accepts Ray's offer in helping him with his problem, gaining access to his computer. He contacts Darlene through the computer, who informs him that the FBI found the arcade and that Romero died. Elliot then tells Mr. Robot that he will hack the FBI.

== Production ==
=== Development ===
In July 2016, USA Network announced that the fourth episode of the season would be titled "eps2.2_init_1.asec". The episode was written and directed by series creator Sam Esmail. This was Esmail's ninth writing credit, and seventh directing credit.

== Reception ==
=== Viewers ===
In its original American broadcast, "eps2.2_init_1.asec" was seen by an estimated 0.637 million household viewers with a 0.3 in the 18-49 demographics. This means that 0.3 percent of all households with televisions watched the episode. This was a 21% decrease in viewership from the previous episode, which was watched by an estimated 0.799 million household viewers with a 0.3 in the 18-49 demographics.

=== Critical reviews ===
"eps2.2_init_1.asec" received extremely positive reviews from critics. The review aggregator website Rotten Tomatoes reported an 89% approval rating for the episode, based on 19 reviews. The site's consensus states: "From the riveting opening scene to its electrifying final moments, 'init1.asec' is packed with consequential moments that set the stage for Elliot's future."

Matt Fowler of IGN gave the episode a "great" 8.3 out of 10 and wrote, "The Tyrell mystery took a backseat this week (though we did see Joanna grow low on funds while paying off the parking lot attendant) as intrigue ramped up regarding the possible undoing of fsociety. Flashbacks, dream sequences, and chess battles for supremacy of the mind filled this episode with layers and mystery, making for a great chapter."

Alex McLevy of The A.V. Club gave the episode a "B+" grade and wrote, "Elliot's going to help him with this mysterious online business, that apparently requires using TOR. But Ray can't let it go; hearing voices can be divine, he says. If you let them. But it's not clear Elliot wants to let anything happen to him. He wants to take control, and make his dream a reality. He would very much like to fight for it."

Alan Sepinwall of HitFix wrote, "I'm glad to hear next week's will be shorter, and I hope that either continues to be the case, or that Elliot's decision to use Ray's computer to contact Darlene and hack the FBI means the show is moving past this phase of things and can more comfortably spread itself out." Jeff Jensen of Entertainment Weekly wrote, "Anyway, it's another piece of metafictional business that gets us questioning the nature of the reality we're seeing. It's also a bit of subversive gamesmanship in an episode with a lot of it. Who's in control? What's real? Who's zooming whom? Who's dreaming whom?"

Jay Bushman of IndieWire gave the episode a "B" grade and wrote, "'init1' also denotes 'Single User Mode' in Linux, setting a system to only allow access to the primary user. This is a literal description of the main conflict, as Elliot and Mr. Robot fight for who is going to have control of Elliot's existence." Genevieve Koski of Vulture gave the episode a 4 star rating out of 5 and wrote, "Contrary to its signature visual style, Mr. Robot delights in narrative symmetry, and tonight's episode is no exception. 'eps2.2init1.asec' begins in the past and ends pointing toward the future, but the central image on both sides are the same: Elliot's face lit by the glow of a computer screen."

Alec Bojalad of Den of Geek gave the episode a 3.5 star rating out of 5 and wrote, "Do Android Dream of Electric Sheep? Sure they do, but when they wake up they won't know how to get them." Paul Dailly of TV Fanatic gave the episode a 4 star rating out of 5 and wrote, "'eps2.2_init_1.asec' was another thrilling episode of this USA Network drama."
