= Eps2.0 unm4sk-pt1.tc =

"eps2.0_unm4sk-pt1.tc"
- Mr. Robot episode
- Episode no.: Season 2 Episode 1
- Directed by: Sam Esmail
- Written by: Sam Esmail
- Cinematography by: Tod Campbell
- Editing by: Franklin Peterson
- Original release date: July 13, 2016
- Running time: 41 minutes

Guest appearances
- Gloria Reuben as Dr. Krista Gordon; Michel Gill as Gideon Goddard; Azhar Khan as Sunil "Mobley" Markesh; Brian Stokes Mitchell as Scott Knowles; Joey Badass as Leon; Sandrine Holt as Susan Jacobs; Erik Jensen as Frank Cody; Vaishnavi Sharma as Magda Alderson

Episode chronology
← Previous "eps1.9 zer0-day.avi"	Next → "eps2.0 unm4sk-pt2.tc"

"eps2.0_unm4sk-pt1.tc" is the first episode of the second season of the American drama thriller television series Mr. Robot. It is the eleventh overall episode of the series and was written and directed by series creator Sam Esmail. It originally aired on USA Network on July 13, 2016, airing back-to-back with the follow-up episode, "eps2.0 unm4sk-pt2.tc".

The series follows Elliot Alderson, a cybersecurity engineer and hacker with social anxiety disorder, who is recruited by an insurrectionary anarchist known as "Mr. Robot" to join a group of hacktivists called "fsociety". In the episode, Elliot has moved in with his mother, in order to escape Mr. Robot's influence.

According to Nielsen Media Research, the episode was seen by an estimated 1.04 million household viewers and gained a 0.4 ratings share among adults aged 18–49. The episode received extremely positive reviews from critics, who praised the new setting, writing and directing.

== Plot ==
In a flashback, Elliot, played by Rami Malek, and Tyrell, played by Martin Wallström, meet at the arcade to discuss their plan. (Note: As depicted in "eps1.8 m1rr0r1ng.qt".) Tyrell receives a call regarding the honeypot, intending to keep it shut down. While Elliot talks with the Dark Army to execute the attack, Tyrell records a video wearing the fsociety mask. Elliot then goes to the popcorn machine to pick up the gun.

One month after the attack, Elliot has moved in to live with his mother, Magda (Vaishnavi Sharma). The attack was condemned by Barack Obama, who named Tyrell and fsociety as responsible. Elliot follows the same routine each day, which includes hanging out with his friend Leon (Joey Badass) and abstaining from using technology. Mr. Robot (Christian Slater) continues seeing him, although Elliot tries to ignore him. Gideon (Michel Gill) visits him, asking for his help as the FBI is questioning Gideon after Allsafe was shut down. When Elliot declines, Gideon threatens to talk about Elliot to the agents.

E Corp general counsel Susan Jacobs (Sandrine Holt) arrives at her smart house. However, the house malfunctions and she decides to temporarily move out. In her absence, Darlene (Carly Chaikin) and Mobley (Azhar Khan) take over the house as their new base of operations. Later, she assigns Mobley to hack on a bank of E Corp. Susan informs Price (Michael Cristofer) and Scott (Brian Stokes Mitchell) that the hackers demand $5.9 million for the clients' records, which Scott refuses to do. Susan convinces them that their losses will be massive and they agree to meet with the hackers, with Scott accepting to deliver the money.

== Production ==
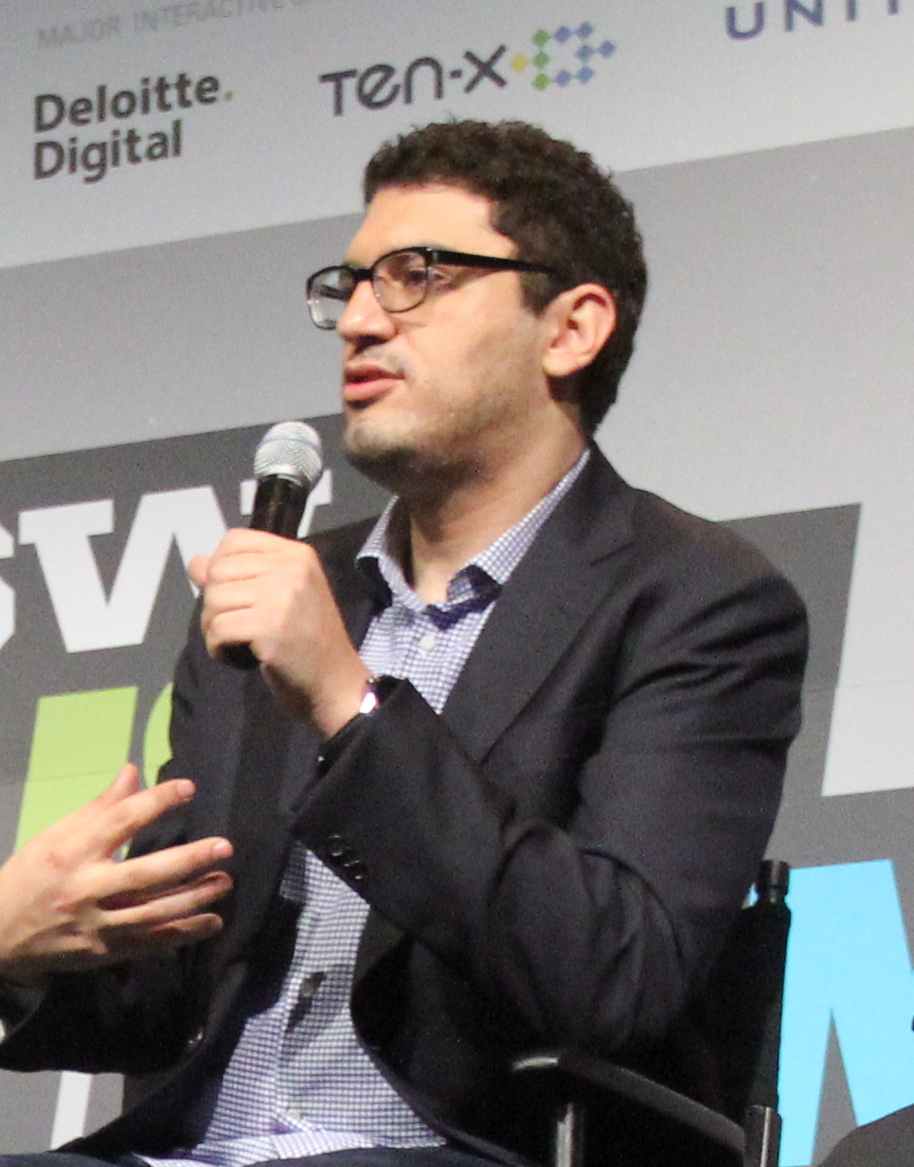
Sam Esmail

=== Development ===
In July 2016, USA Network announced that the first episode of the season would be titled "eps2.0_unm4sk-pt1.tc". The episode was written and directed by series creator Sam Esmail. This was Esmail's sixth writing credit, and fourth directing credit.

== Reception ==
=== Viewers ===
In its original American broadcast, "eps2.0_unm4sk-pt1.tc" was seen by an estimated 1.04 million household viewers with a 0.4 in the 18-49 demographics. This means that 0.4 percent of all households with televisions watched the episode. This was a 15% decrease in viewership from the previous episode, which was watched by an estimated 1.21 million household viewers with a 0.5 in the 18-49 demographics.

=== Critical reviews ===
"eps2.0_unm4sk-pt1.tc" received extremely positive reviews from critics. The review aggregator website Rotten Tomatoes reported an 100% approval rating for the episode, based on 27 reviews. The site's consensus states: "Sam Esmail's impeccably directed premiere returns Mr. Robot in dizzyingly terrific form, weaving Eliot's unraveling along with the country's in a compelling, high-stakes look at psyche and society."

Matt Fowler of IGN gave the episode a "great" 8 out of 10 and wrote, "This double-sized premiere really felt like a slow burn entry into this new summer run. Not that Mr. Robot was ever a fact-paced show, but there was a more methodical approach here. Perhaps the feeling comes from everyone now being scattered in the wake of the hack, coupled with the fact that we now have the Mr. Robot secret confirmed so all conversations between him and Elliot now don't really go anywhere necessarily. It's one guy yelling (or shooting!) and the other guy resisting, or trying to ignore. One thinking he's in control and the other insisting control is an illusion."

Alex McLevy of The A.V. Club gave the episode a "B+" grade and wrote, "The episode was dedicated to depicting how what comes after a major transformation is never what you expected it to be. Elliot's new life hasn't freed him from Mr. Robot; if anything, it's increased the intensity of his visits." Jeff Jensen of Entertainment Weekly wrote, "The premiere is "The Summer Man" episode of Mad Men, Mr. Robot-syle. (Seriously, in Elliot, we do see reflected religious anxieties about the influence of culture and the proper philosophy of engaging it. This episode models the old school practice of separation and isolation.)"

Genevieve Koski of Vulture gave the episode a 4 star rating out of 5 and wrote, "As always, whatever the hell is going on inside Elliot's head is the most confounding aspect of Mr. Robot. Showrunner Sam Esmail is pushing the unreliable-narrator conceit as far as he can here, even getting a little meta with it when Elliot shifts the narrative focus from his session with Krista to us." Alec Bojalad of Den of Geek wrote, "The banks were screwed and the people were liberated. Now in season two here we find out that the banking system in the United States doesn't just view the absence of debt as proof that people are no longer in debt to them. Instead, it's a sign that everyone is in debt to them until they can prove otherwise. On one hand, that's pretty frustrating narratively. It promptly cuts the legs out from a lot of momentum Mr. Robot had going into season two. Sure, there are signs of financial catastrophe. President Obama regularly appears on television warning of grave financial consequences, people pay for almost everything in cash and the Wall Street bull gets fixed. On the other hand though, how much has really changed?"
