= Eps2.1 k3rnel-pan1c.ksd =

"eps2.1_k3rnel-pan1c.ksd"
- Mr. Robot episode
- Episode no.: Season 2 Episode 3
- Directed by: Sam Esmail
- Written by: Sam Esmail
- Cinematography by: Tod Campbell
- Editing by: Philip Harrison
- Original release date: July 20, 2016
- Running time: 63 minutes

Guest appearances
- Azhar Khan as Sunil "Mobley" Markesh; Sunita Mani as Shama "Trenton" Biswas; Joey Badass as Leon; Ron Cephas Jones as Leslie Romero; Vaishnavi Sharma as Magda Alderson; Michael Maize as "Lone Star" Lockwood; Dorothi Fox as Nell Romero; Luke Robertson as RT; Craig Robinson as Ray Heyworth

Episode chronology
← Previous "eps2.0 unm4sk-pt2.tc"	Next → "eps2.2 init 1.asec"

"eps2.1_k3rnel-pan1c.ksd" is the third episode of the second season of the American drama thriller television series Mr. Robot. It is the thirteenth overall episode of the series and was written and directed by series creator Sam Esmail. It originally aired on USA Network on July 20, 2016.

The series follows Elliot Alderson, a cybersecurity engineer and hacker with social anxiety disorder, who is recruited by an insurrectionary anarchist known as "Mr. Robot" to join a group of hacktivists called "fsociety". In the episode, Elliot starts consuming Adderall pills to get rid of Mr. Robot, while Mobley stumbles upon an horrific discovery.

According to Nielsen Media Research, the episode was seen by an estimated 0.799 million household viewers and gained a 0.3 ratings share among adults aged 18–49. The episode received extremely positive reviews from critics, who praised the performances, directing and intrigue.

== Plot ==
In a flashback, Romero (Ron Cephas Jones) has recently been released from prison. He rents the arcade, Fun Society, to Mobley (Azhar Khan), while also revealing some of the dark history of the arcade. Seeing potential in him, Mobley decides to recruit him into fsociety, convincing him that he can retaliate against the prison responsible for his arrest.

In present day, Elliot (Rami Malek) talks with Tyrell (Martin Wallström) over the phone, who won't disclose his location. Mr. Robot (Christian Slater) hangs up the phone, and angrily claims that Elliot is not respecting their deal. Elliot is confused, and also discovers Gideon's murder through the TV. Disturbed, he starts consuming Adderall pills that Leon (Joey Badass) provides him, despite Mr. Robot's protests. However, while walking on the street, Elliot is kidnapped by men in a black van. The kidnappers take him to a warehouse, where they force him to ingest cement, causing him to later vomit the Adderall pills in his bedroom. As Mr. Robot mocks him, Elliot consumes the pills he vomited.

Mobley visits Romero's house, only to discover him murdered in the backyard. Darlene (Carly Chaikin) blames it on Romero's drug deals, but Mobley is saddened over the loss of his friend. Mobley and Trenton (Sunita Mani) suspect the Dark Army was involved, but Darlene is skeptical as they did not know about Romero. She tells them to stay off the grid, although Mobley is scared of her and Elliot. Dominique (Grace Gummer) is called to investigate the crime scene, finding a printed list on the computer table denoting FBI agents and their information, of which she takes a snapshot. Angela (Portia Doubleday) dines with Price (Michael Cristofer) and two E Corp executives. Price reveals that the men were involved in the Washington Township event, providing her with evidence and letting her decide on what to do.

Elliot's behavior changes, as the pills cause him to lose sleep for days. During a church group meeting, he lashes out his frustrations with everything before storming off. At the diner, he is approached by Ray (Craig Robinson), who found his journal. Ray relates how his wife's death altered his life, and wants Elliot's help through Mr. Robot. Dominique decides to visit Romero's mother, convincing her to let her enter. During the visit, she finds a poster for the "End of the World Party". Following the address, she finds the arcade.

== Production ==
=== Development ===
In July 2016, USA Network announced that the third episode of the season would be titled "eps2.1_k3rnel-pan1c.ksd". The episode was written and directed by series creator Sam Esmail. This was Esmail's eighth writing credit, and sixth directing credit.

== Reception ==
=== Viewers ===
In its original American broadcast, "eps2.1_k3rnel-pan1c.ksd" was seen by an estimated 0.799 million household viewers with a 0.3 in the 18-49 demographics. This means that 0.3 percent of all households with televisions watched the episode. This was a 24% decrease in viewership from the previous episode, which was watched by an estimated 1.04 million household viewers with a 0.4 in the 18-49 demographics.

=== Critical reviews ===
"eps2.1_k3rnel-pan1c.ksd" received extremely positive reviews from critics. The review aggregator website Rotten Tomatoes reported an 100% approval rating for the episode, based on 22 reviews. The site's consensus states: "The dense, beautifully crafted 'k3rnel-pan1c.ksd' highlights new characters, new alliances, and a huge final reveal while maintaining a haunting, visceral account of Elliot's mental collapse."

Matt Fowler of IGN gave the episode a "great" 8.5 out of 10 and wrote, "We certainly learned a lot this week - about new characters, new alliances, and old arcades - and Elliot's mental collapse due to Adderall abuse made for some killer, stylized TV."

Alex McLevy of The A.V. Club gave the episode a "B+" grade and wrote, "It's the lack of Mr. Robot that shapes his whole existence, until Ray finally gives him a way of understanding his imperfect role in this imperfect world. Any time we think we have a handle on things, that's when the real illusion begins, the show argues. And be honest, because it's Elliot asking: You're not buying any of this either. Are you?"

Alan Sepinwall of HitFix wrote, "The episode as a whole represents Mr. Robot as a series that's at once both wildly out of control and under complete control. At slightly over an hour without commercials, it feels much too long for the amount of story it contains, and there are certain sequences that feel like they go on forever, just because they can. But a lot of the show's self-indulgence goes to sequences so remarkable that I just have to smile, go with it, and accept that all the different excesses come from the same basic place: Sam Esmail saying to himself, 'How can I present each moment in a way that looks, sounds, and feels like nothing that's ever been on television before?'" Kyle Fowle of Entertainment Weekly wrote, "The world outside of Elliot doesn't stop so he can play games though. Dominique, thanks to some expertly placed moving materials, finds the old Fun Society, the classic arcade that was the headquarters for fsociety. So long to the 'U' and the 'N.' There's violence in those walls, and maybe in the popcorn machine."

Jay Bushman of IndieWire gave the episode an "A–" grade and wrote, "The season's tag line is 'Control Is An Illusion,' but Ray makes it much more colorful: 'Control is about as real as a one-legged unicorn taking a leak at the end of a double rainbow.'" Genevieve Koski of Vulture gave the episode a 3 star rating out of 5 and wrote, "The closing moment where the camera pans up as Dom looks at the arcade's F__ SOCIETY sign is a thing of beauty, bringing full circle the cold-open sequence with Romero and Mobely discussing the arcade’s bloody history. It's a sign that Mr. Robot has some good story left ahead of it — a story that Elliot will hopefully rejoin soon."

Alec Bojalad of Den of Geek gave the episode a 4 star rating out of 5 and wrote, "This is an incredibly competitive TV environment with too many good shows and too many good performances for everyone deserving of recognition receiving it. So one could have been forgiven for reacting to last week's Emmy nominations with 'Really? The weird dude from the USA Network show for Best Actor?' In 'Kernel Panic,' however, Rami Malek shows just how crucial he is to the functional operation of Mr. Robot and that he more than belongs on the shortlist of current great TV actors." Caralynn Lippo of TV Fanatic gave the episode a 4.6 star rating out of 5 and wrote, "'Kernel Panic' was, as usual, a brilliant installment of an always-brilliant series. Particularly impressive was the way the show managed to weave in time to significantly develop new characters Dom DiPierro (the FBI agent investigation the 5/9 Hack) and Ray, Elliot's new, very questionable, friend."
