= Eps1.7 wh1ter0se.m4v =

"eps1.7_wh1ter0se.m4v"
- Mr. Robot episode
- Elliot checks his family photo, remembering that Mr. Robot is his father and Darlene is his sister.
- Episode no.: Season 1 Episode 8
- Directed by: Christoph Schrewe
- Written by: Randolph Leon
- Cinematography by: Tod Campbell
- Editing by: Franklin Peterson
- Original release date: August 12, 2015
- Running time: 45 minutes

Guest appearances
- Ben Rappaport as Ollie Parker; Michel Gill as Gideon Goddard; Ron Cephas Jones as Leslie Romero; BD Wong as Whiterose; Stephanie Corneliussen as Joanna Wellick; Aaron Takahashi as Lloyd Chong; Jeremy Holm as Donald "Mr. Sutherland" Hoffman; Azhar Khan as Sunil "Mobley" Markesh; Sunita Mani as Shama "Trenton" Biswas; Nick Mills as Xander Jones; Stephen Lin as the Hamburger Man; Edward James Highland as Quattlander; Mark Lotito as Jones

Episode chronology
← Previous "eps1.6 v1ew-s0urce.flv"	Next → "eps1.8 m1rr0r1ng.qt"

"eps1.7_wh1ter0se.m4v" is the eighth episode of the American drama thriller television series Mr. Robot. The episode was written by Randolph Leon and directed by Christoph Schrewe. It originally aired on USA Network on August 12, 2015.

The series follows Elliot Alderson, a cybersecurity engineer and hacker with social anxiety disorder, who is recruited by an insurrectionary anarchist known as "Mr. Robot" to join a group of hacktivists called "fsociety". In the episode, Elliot gets involved with the Dark Army, while Tyrell gets questioned over Sharon's death.

According to Nielsen Media Research, the episode was seen by an estimated 1.24 million household viewers and gained a 0.4 ratings share among adults aged 18–49. The episode received critical acclaim, with the twist ending receiving praise from critics.

== Plot ==
After spending the night with a man, Darlene (Carly Chaikin) steals a gun from his safe and leaves for ballet lessons. There, she meets with Angela (Portia Doubleday) and their conversation reveals that they have known each other for a time.

Elliot (Rami Malek) tells Mr. Robot (Christian Slater), Romero (Ron Cephas Jones), Mobley (Azhar Khan), and Trenton (Sunita Mani) about their plan, in which they will use new control systems at Steel Mountain. Darlene informs Elliot that the Dark Army is following them and gives him the stolen gun, but he refuses to take it, so she hides it inside a popcorn machine. Elliot returns to Allsafe, where it is reported to have been hacked. There, he is asked by Ollie (Ben Rappaport) to take some hard drives to be repaired, a job not usually done by the engineers. Hacking his e-mail, he questions Angela over why she did not ask for his help in the blackmail.

Tyrell (Martin Wallström) is visited by Gideon (Michel Gill), who reports about Colby's release. He also mentions that during the Allsafe hacking, he turned E Corp's hacked server into a honeypot. This attracts Tyrell's interest, prompting him to look for the .dat file. However, he leaves the office when the police arrive to question him about Sharon's death. He meets with Mr. Robot, demanding to know more about his plan. Mr. Robot refuses to disclose it, even when Tyrell claims to know his "dirty little secret." As Tyrell begins drinking at home, he is approached by police officers over Sharon's death. To get rid of the officers, Joanna (Stephanie Corneliussen) breaks her own water with a fork, and Tyrell is allowed to go with her to the hospital.

At a building, Elliot is led by the Dark Army to a Faraday cage room, where he meets Whiterose (BD Wong), a transgender woman obsessed with time. Whiterose explains that the Dark Army backed out due to Gideon's plan for the honeypot. Whiterose gives Elliot two days to shut down the honeypot, during which the Dark Army will collaborate on the hack. To do so, Elliot has Darlene broadcast a fsociety message to Allsafe. While everyone is distracted in the room, Elliot gains access to Gideon's phone to remove the honeypot service order. However, he is reprimanded by Gideon for not joining the other staff in the room, making clear his suspicion of Elliot.

At Coney Island, Elliot meets with Darlene, with both ecstatic over the incoming attack. When Darlene says "I love you so much", Elliot kisses her. Darlene revolts, saying "Did you forget who I am?", confusing him. He concludes that she is his sister, causing him to leave in a panic as his memory of the fact begins to reemerge. At his apartment, Elliot starts searching about his past, eventually finding an unlabeled CD. This includes family photos of a young Elliot, Darlene and their mother with a man resembling Mr. Robot, revealing that it is his father. Mr. Robot then shows up at his door, telling him they need to talk.

== Production ==
=== Development ===
In August 2015, USA Network announced that the eighth episode of the season would be titled "eps1.7_wh1ter0se.m4v". The episode was written by Randolph Leon and directed by Christoph Schrewe. This was Leon's first writing credit, and Schrewe's first directing credit.

== Reception ==
=== Viewers ===
In its original American broadcast, "eps1.7_wh1ter0se.m4v" was seen by an estimated 1.24 million household viewers with a 0.4 in the 18-49 demographics. This means that 0.4 percent of all households with televisions watched the episode. This was a 7% increase in viewership from the previous episode, which was watched by an estimated 1.15 million household viewers with a 0.5 in the 18-49 demographics.

=== Critical reviews ===
"eps1.7_wh1ter0se.m4v" received critical acclaim. The review aggregator website Rotten Tomatoes reported an 100% approval rating for the episode, based on 10 reviews.

Amy Ratcliffe of IGN gave the episode an "amazing" 9.2 out of 10 and wrote in her verdict, "Mr. Robot continues to prove itself to be the best show of the summer. Malek delivers gripping and ranged performances over and over and does an excellent job of bringing the viewer into Elliot's world. This series doesn't shy away from the unknown, and they've basically wiped the board and made viewers question everything - again - with only two more episodes left in the season."

Alex McLevy of The A.V. Club gave the episode an "A–" grade and wrote, "Rather than some generic bemoaning of the idea that our fathers and grandfathers once had some idea of how to be a man, and we've lost that in today's society, Mr. Robot flipped the script: Contemporary men learned all too well from those who came before how they are supposed to be men, and now, as progress moves inexorably forward, we are choking on that retrograde lesson."

Alan Sepinwall of HitFix wrote, "Mr. Robot has been a show with secrets all along – chief among them the question of whether the title character is real or just Elliot's alter ego – but this week's episode revealed that there were far more secrets than even we might have realized going in." Samantha Sofka of Nerdist wrote, "This chilling moment is not only the best scene in the entire season, but one of the most visceral interpretations of paranoia I've ever seen. The director's dedication to viewer immersion is an impressive way to keep fans guessing about what's coming next and a fascinating way to tackle the 'unreliable narrator' trope."

Kyle Fowle of Entertainment Weekly wrote, "A recurring theme of the first season of Mr. Robot is paranoia. It's palpable in every episode, from the paranoia Elliot feels in his everyday life to the paranoia Wellick feels in regards to his position within Evil Corp. It was only a matter of time before the show started to reveal if the paranoia was justified or not, and tonight's episode does just that." Matthew Giles of Vulture gave the episode a perfect 5 star rating out of 5 and wrote, "As Esmail has demonstrated throughout this first season, reality isn't always accurate. This is abundantly clear in the 21st century: There is a distinction between online reality and IRL, and what appears real in both spheres might also be untrue. Think of catfishing, online scams, Ponzi schemes, and all the other machinations that exist in our dual worlds. This theme has been central to Mr. Robot, and this episode in particular was evidence that even when the truth is plainly presented and without bias, it's still difficult to know the truth."

Frances Roberts of Den of Geek wrote, "Whammo. Talk about a distraction-hack. We've spent all this time debating the mystery of Mr Robot's true identity, we never questioned who Darlene really is. It took Elliot pulling a Skywalker and planting one on her for the revelation to come: she's Elliot’s sister, and Mr Robot is (was?) their dad." Caralynn Lippo of TV Fanatic a 4.75 star rating out of 5 and wrote, "We all knew that there was some sort of twist coming down the pipeline on Mr. Robot. Many predicted a Fight Club-esque twist revealing that Mr. Robot and Elliot were two parts of the same man. But I challenge anyone to truthfully tell me that they predicted both parts of that double-whammy of a reveal in the final few minutes of [the episode]. If you did, you should probably go play the lotto, like, yesterday."
