= Eps1.8 m1rr0r1ng.qt =

"eps1.8_m1rr0r1ng.qt"
- Mr. Robot episode
- Mr. Robot takes Elliot to Elward Alderson's grave, where Elliot remembers that his father is long dead and Mr. Robot is nothing more than his own split personality.
- Episode no.: Season 1 Episode 9
- Directed by: Tricia Brock
- Written by: Sam Esmail
- Cinematography by: Tod Campbell
- Editing by: Sam Seig; Andrew Thompson
- Original release date: August 19, 2015
- Running time: 49 minutes

Guest appearances
- Michel Gill as Gideon Goddard; Randy Harrison as Harry Davis; Bruce Altman as Terry Colby; Aidan Liebman as Young Elliot; Sakina Jaffrey as Antara Nayar; Michael Cristofer as Phillip Price; Stephanie Corneliussen as Joanna Wellick; Aaron Takahashi as Lloyd Chong; Don Sparks as Donald Moss; Edward James Highland as Quattlander; Mark Lotito as Jones; Nadia Gan as Elizabeth Chen

Episode chronology
← Previous "eps1.7 wh1ter0se.m4v"	Next → "eps1.9 zer0-day.avi"

"eps1.8_m1rr0r1ng.qt" is the ninth episode of the American drama thriller television series Mr. Robot. The episode was written by series creator Sam Esmail and directed by Tricia Brock. It originally aired on USA Network on August 19, 2015.

The series follows Elliot Alderson, a cybersecurity engineer and hacker with social anxiety disorder, who is recruited by an insurrectionary anarchist known as "Mr. Robot" to join a group of hacktivists called "fsociety". In the episode, Elliot goes on a road trip with Mr. Robot to his childhood home, looking for answers.

According to Nielsen Media Research, the episode was seen by an estimated 1.32 million household viewers and gained a 0.5 ratings share among adults aged 18–49. The episode received critical acclaim, with critics praising the revelations, performances and writing.

== Plot ==
In 1994, Elliot's father, Edward (Christian Slater), works at the computer repair shop "Mr. Robot". One day, Edward is reprimanded by a customer after claiming that Elliot stole $20 from him. While Elliot confesses to doing so, Edward decides to take him to the movie theater, reiterating that he is still a good kid.

In present day, Elliot (Rami Malek) angrily confronts Mr. Robot for not saying anything earlier. He demands answers from his past, so Mr. Robot takes him on a trip. They head to a train station and leave for New Jersey. Angela (Portia Doubleday) starts working for Antara (Sakina Jaffrey) after losing her job at Allsafe, and contacts Darlene (Carly Chaikin) over Elliot's whereabouts.

At the hospital, Tyrell (Martin Wallström) and Joanna (Stephanie Corneliussen) welcome their child, a boy. However, Joanna is disgusted with Tyrell's recent behavior and tells him he will have to fix everything if he wants to be part of the family, as she does not want to continue being married to him. He returns to his office, where Price (Michael Cristofer) states that the police has deemed Tyrell a person of interest in Sharon's death. Coupled with the animosity between Tyrell and Scott, Price decides to fire him, angering Tyrell.

In New Jersey, Elliot and Mr. Robot visit his old childhood home. While Mr. Robot is distracted, Elliot pushes him out of a window, with the former reiterating he should not feel guilty for revealing his secret to his mother. He then takes him to a graveyard, while Darlene and Angela are heard in the distance. Before they arrive, Mr. Robot asks Elliot not to let them get rid of him, stating he will always love him. Darlene and Angela finally find Elliot, who is now alone on Edward's grave. Realizing that Mr. Robot's injuries are now on him, Elliot concludes that he is Mr. Robot by having adopted his persona. They return to New York City.

Angela returns home, finding Colby (Bruce Altman) talking with her adoptive father, Don (Don Sparks). Colby offers her an opportunity to work at E Corp, but she doesn't want to get involved with them. Darlene takes Elliot to his apartment and leaves to find his medication. After she leaves, Elliot is visited by Tyrell, who reveals that he knows Elliot's involvement with fsociety. He confesses about killing Sharon and feeling powerful about it, and wants to get involved in Elliot's plan. Elliot and Tyrell go to fsociety's hideout, with Elliot stating they will work together in encrypting E Corp's files. As they talk, Elliot stares at the popcorn machine where Darlene hid the gun.

== Production ==
=== Development ===
In August 2015, USA Network announced that the ninth episode of the season would be titled "eps1.8_m1rr0r1ng.qt". The episode was written by series creator Sam Esmail and directed by Tricia Brock. This was Esmail's fourth writing credit, and Brock's first directing credit.

== Reception ==
=== Viewers ===
In its original American broadcast, "eps1.8_m1rr0r1ng.qt" was seen by an estimated 1.32 million household viewers with a 0.5 in the 18-49 demographics. This means that 0.5 percent of all households with televisions watched the episode. This was a 6% increase in viewership from the previous episode, which was watched by an estimated 1.24 million household viewers with a 0.4 in the 18-49 demographics.

=== Critical reviews ===
"eps1.8_m1rr0r1ng.qt" received critical acclaim. The review aggregator website Rotten Tomatoes reported a 100% approval rating for the episode, based on 10 reviews.

Amy Ratcliffe of IGN gave the episode a "great" 8.8 out of 10 and wrote in her verdict, "Mr. Robot never shows its full hand and remains wildly unpredictable. It manages to balance the big turns with small human moments that make the ensemble vibe stronger. Elliot's still the focus because much depends on his actions and interpretation of reality, but the supporting cast has rounded out in wonderfully unexpected ways since the beginning of the season."

Alex McLevy of The A.V. Club gave the episode an "A" grade and wrote, "Most crucial of all, we still don't know our part in all of this. Usually, the moment in a puzzle where the pieces come together, and the mysteries begin to be revealed, is a letdown. But Mr. Robot has elegantly flipped the script. Here, these discoveries aren't narrowing the story into one recognizable outcome, be it some traditional resolution or digestible television trope. No, all this is doing is foregrounding the audience's lack of access to anything we might normally be able to cling to for reassurance."

Alan Sepinwall of HitFix wrote, "Many shows built around mysteries struggle when it's time to explain themselves. So far, Mr. Robot is doing a great job of turning over its cards without making it feel like the game has ended." Samantha Sofka of Nerdist wrote, "As last week's episode already established, Mr. Robot is indeed Elliot's father, but of course, it's not quite what you think. This week's episode 'm1rr0r1ng.qt' picks back up with the father-son confrontation we've been waiting for. Elliot is equal parts mad, confused, and incredulous that his father decided to conceal his identity. It's hard to top the rest of the season, but Rami Malek's acting in this scene is particularly gripping. As the volume of his voice went up, so did the hairs on the back of my neck."

Kevin P. Sullivan of Entertainment Weekly wrote, "That's a hell of a way to set the stakes incredibly high for the end of the first season and imbue the final episode with mystery just minutes after revealing the season's supposed biggest twist." Matthew Giles of Vulture gave the episode a perfect 5 star rating out of 5 and wrote, "His moral compass is directed by the axiom taught long ago that a large wrong outweighs a smaller one, and even though he is stealing from Evil Corp, his actions will benefit humanity."

Frances Roberts of Den of Geek wrote, "Contrary to expectation, having predicted the twist didn't dilute its dramatic impact. That was largely thanks to Rami Malek, whose performance sold Elliot's desperate disorientation with utter conviction. Props have to go to Christian Slater too, and moreover to whomever cast him in this part. I can't think of a better choice to play a middle-aged malcontent lunatic hacker projected from the mind of his malcontent lunatic hacker son. Kudos." Caralynn Lippo of TV Fanatic a 4.75 star rating out of 5 and wrote, "[The episode] was a refreshingly clear hour with a ton of interesting plot developments and clarifications after the last 'Wait, what?' installment. It set up several new movements nicely as we careen into the season finale."
