= Stephanie Corneliussen =

Danish actress

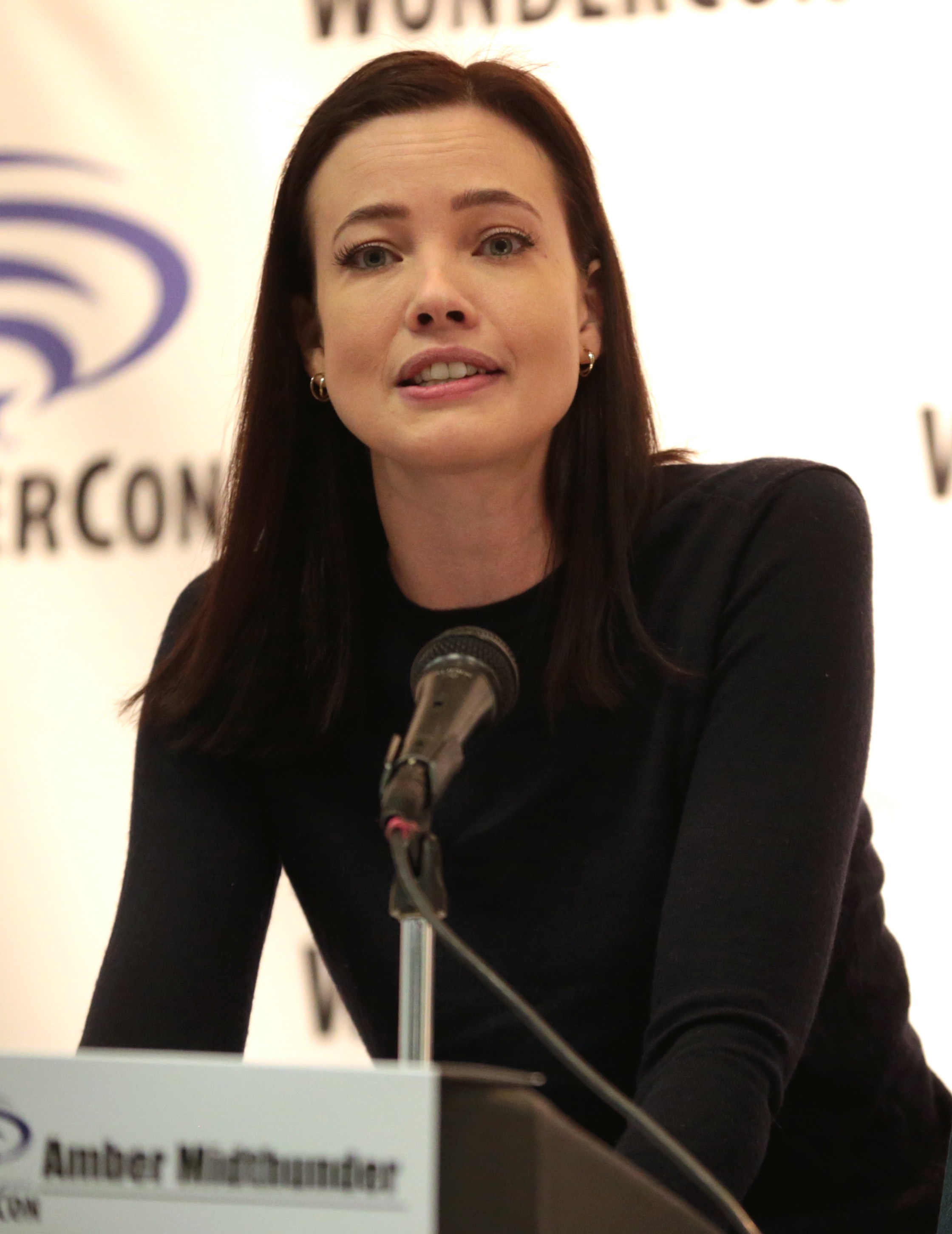
- Corneliussen at WonderCon in 2017
- Born: 28 April 1987 (age 39); Copenhagen, Denmark
- Occupations: Actress; model
- Years active: 2000–present

Stephanie Corneliussen (Danish: [kʰɒˈne̝ˀliusn̩]; born 28 April 1987) is a Danish actress and model. She is best known for her role as Joanna Wellick in Mr. Robot.

== Early life and education ==
Corneliussen was born on 28 April 1987 in Copenhagen, Denmark. She attended Johannesskolen in Frederiksberg and studied ballet in Copenhagen. She has a degree in graphic design.

She was discovered at age 13 and encouraged to enter the Supermodel of Scandinavia contest, which was orchestrated by Jacqueline Friis Mikkelsen, the CEO of Unique Models, an international modeling agency based in Copenhagen. She won the contest and subsequently began her international modeling career.

While still expanding her modeling career, she began studying in the United Kingdom in 2007, and in 2011 she relocated to Los Angeles.

== Career ==
=== Modeling ===
Corneliussen has been on the cover of and featured in many magazines, including GQ, Vanity Fair, treats!, Vs., Playboy, and Vogue. She has also appeared in several ad campaigns and commercials for brands like Bebe, Armani, Dasani, Lexus and Nikon. As of 2016, Corneliussen is represented by PCM International.

=== Acting ===
Corneliussen has had guest appearances on the USA Network medical drama series Royal Pains, the NBC sitcom Bad Judge and the TV Land sitcom The Exes. On July 30, 2012, Corneliussen appeared in Matchbox Twenty's official video for "She's So Mean" as the mayhem wielding girl.

For the American anthology horror television series American Horror Story, Corneliussen portrayed the "White Nun", the face representing the second season, subtitled Asylum. In 2013, she appeared in the film Hansel and Gretel: Witch Hunters, and the following year she portrayed Tatiana in HBO's Emmy Award nominated TV film Hello Ladies.

In 2015, Corneliussen was cast in a recurring role in the USA Network drama–thriller television series Mr. Robot, playing the character of Joanna Wellick. The pilot premiered on May 27, 2015. The show has received critical acclaim and has been nominated for multiple awards, winning the 2015 Golden Globe Award for Best Television Series – Drama. Mr. Robot was picked up for a second season. In September 2015, it was announced that Corneliussen had been cast as Valentina Vostok in the CW series DC's Legends of Tomorrow, a spin-off of Arrow and The Flash.

In March 2016, Corneliussen was promoted to series regular and added to the main cast of Mr. Robot.

In 2018, she was cast as the mysterious antagonist in the television series Deception. In 2019, she appeared as Gabrielle Haller in Noah Hawley's Legion.

== Personal life ==
Corneliussen is bisexual. She is an animal-rights advocate and has been a vegan since 2013.

== Filmography ==
=== Film ===
| Year | Title | Role | Notes |
|---|---|---|---|
| 2013 | Hansel & Gretel: Witch Hunters | Desert Witch | |
| 2014 | Hello Ladies: The Movie | Tatiana | TV movie of Hello Ladies |
| 2022 | The Invitation | Viktoria | |

=== Television ===
| Year | Title | Role | Notes |
|---|---|---|---|
| 2014 | The Rebels | Gorgeous Intern Ashley | Episode: "Pilot" |
| 2014 | Royal Pains | Sloane Lerner | Episode: "Hankmed on the Half Shell" |
| 2015 | Bad Judge | Appolonia | Episode: "Case Closed" |
| 2015 | The Exes | Nadia | Episode: "Him" |
| 2015–17 | Mr. Robot | Joanna Wellick | Main role |
| 2016 | Legends of Tomorrow | Valentina Vostok | 2 episodes |
| 2018 | Deception | Mystery Woman | Recurring role |
| 2019 | Legion | Gabrielle Xavier | Recurring role |

=== Music videos ===
| Year | Artist | Title |
|---|---|---|
| 2010 | Private | "My Secret Lover" |
| 2012 | Matchbox Twenty | "She's So Mean" |
