= Michael Cristofer =

American actor and director

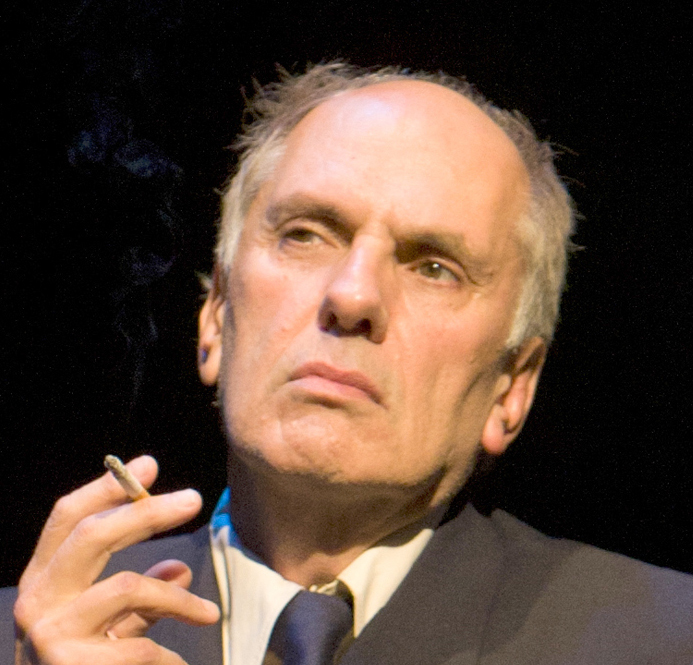
- Cristofer as Adolf Eichmann in Captors at the Boston University Theatre (2011)
- Born: Michael Procaccino; January 22, 1945 (age 81); Trenton, New Jersey, U.S.
- Occupations: Actor; playwright; director; screenwriter
- Writing career
- Genre: Drama
- Notable work: The Shadow Box
- Notable awards: Pulitzer Prize; Tony Award

Michael Cristofer (born January 22, 1945) is an American actor, playwright, and filmmaker. He received the Pulitzer Prize for Drama and the Tony Award for Best Play for The Shadow Box in 1977. From 2015 to 2019, he played the role of Phillip Price in the television series Mr. Robot.

== Life and career ==
Cristofer was born Michael Procaccino in Trenton, New Jersey, the son of Mary and Joseph Procaccino. Raised in Hamilton Township, Mercer County, New Jersey, he started acting as a student at Notre Dame High School.

He started his theatrical career as an actor, primarily on stage. He also started writing plays. He has also written numerous screenplays for film.

Cristofer was awarded a Pulitzer Prize for Drama and a Tony Award for the Broadway production of his play The Shadow Box (1977). Other plays include Breaking Up at Primary Stages; Ice at Manhattan Theatre Club; Black Angel at Circle Repertory Company; The Lady and the Clarinet (starring Stockard Channing), produced by the Mark Taper Forum, Long Wharf Theater, Off-Broadway and on the London Fringe; and Amazing Grace (1996; starring Marsha Mason), which received the American Theater Critics Award as the best play produced in the United States during the 1996–1997 season.

Cristofer's film work includes the screenplays for The Shadow Box, directed by Paul Newman (Golden Globe Award, Emmy nomination); Falling in Love; The Witches of Eastwick, adapted from the novel by John Updike; The Bonfire of the Vanities, adapted from the novel by Tom Wolfe and directed by Brian De Palma; Breaking Up, and Casanova.

His directing credits include Gia, starring Angelina Jolie, Mercedes Ruehl and Faye Dunaway, which was nominated for five Emmy Awards and for which he won a Directors Guild Award. He next directed Body Shots and Original Sin, released in 2001.

For eight years, he worked as artistic advisor and finally co-artistic director of River Arts Repertory in Woodstock, New York, a company which produced plays by writers such as Richard Nelson, Mac Wellman, and Eric Overmeyer, including the American premiere of Edward Albee's Three Tall Women, a production that later moved to Off-Broadway.

Also at River Arts, he wrote stage adaptations of the films Love Me or Leave Me and Casablanca. He directed Joanne Woodward in his adaptation of Henrik Ibsen's Ghosts. His most recent work for the theater, The Whore and Mr. Moore, premiered at Dorset Theatre Festival's 2012 summer season. He collaborated with trumpeter Terence Blanchard, writing the libretto for Champion, a boxing opera in jazz music based on the life of prize fighter Emile Griffith. It premiered in June 2013 at Opera Theater of St. Louis. His work Execution of the Caregiver is based on the true story of a woman in South Carolina who killed her mother, fiancé and several people for whom she purportedly was caring.

After a 15-year hiatus, Cristofer returned to his acting career, appearing in Romeo and Juliet (New York Shakespeare Festival), Trumpery by Peter Parnell, Three Sisters (Williamstown Theater), Body of Water (with Christine Lahti), and the Broadway revival of A View from the Bridge (starring Liev Schreiber and Scarlett Johansson). He recently appeared in The Other Woman (with Natalie Portman), and created the role of Gus in Tony Kushner's The Intelligent Homosexual's Guide to Capitalism and Socialism with a Key to the Scriptures at the Public Theater.

In 2010, Cristofer was a cast member on Rubicon, in which he played Truxton Spangler. In 2012, he played Jerry Rand on Smash.

In 2013–2014, he played millionaire witch-hunter Harrison Renard in American Horror Story: Coven. In 2015, Cristofer made guest appearances in four episodes of season one of Mr. Robot as Phillip Price, the shadowy CEO of the sinister E Corp, and he became a cast member in season two, three, and four.

== Works ==
=== Plays ===
- The Shadow Box (1975)
- Ice (1976)
- Black Angel (1978)
- The Lady and the Clarinet (1980)
- Breaking Up (1990)
- The Blues Are Running (1996)
- Man in the Ring (2016)

=== Films ===
Year	Title	Director	Writer
1984	Falling in Love	No	Yes
1987	The Witches of Eastwick	No	Yes
1990	The Bonfire of the Vanities	No	Yes
1993	Mr. Jones	No	Yes
1997	Breaking Up	No	Yes
1999	Body Shots	Yes	No
2001	Original Sin	Yes	Yes
2005	Casanova	No	Story
2016	Chuck	No	Yes
2020	The Night Clerk	Yes	Yes

Acting roles

Year	Title	Role	Notes
1973	The Exorcist	Voice	Uncredited
1974	The Crazy World of Julius Vrooder	Alessini	
1978	An Enemy of the People	Hovstad	
1984	The Little Drummer Girl	Tayeh	
1995	Die Hard with a Vengeance	CIA Agent Bill Jarvis	
2009	The Other Woman	Sheldon	
2014	Emoticon ;)	Walter Nevins	
2015	The Adderall Diaries	Paul Hora	
2015	Chronic	John	
2015	The Girl in the Book	Dad	
2016	Year by the Sea	Robin	

=== Television ===
Year	Title	Director	Writer	Notes
1980	The Shadow Box	No	Yes	TV movie
1983	Candida	Yes	No	TV movie
1998	Gia	Yes	Yes	TV movie
2009	Georgia O'Keeffe	No	Yes	TV movie
2009	Eastwick	No	Yes	Episode: "Pilot"
2024	The Great Lillian Hall	Yes	No	TV movie

Acting roles

Year	Title	Role	Notes
1974	The Magician	David Webster	Episode: "The Illusion of Black Gold"
1974	Gunsmoke	Ben	2 episodes
1974–1976	Carl Sandburg's Lincoln	John Nicolay	5 episodes
1975	The Rookies	Charlie Phillips	Episode: "Someone Who Cares"
1975	Kojak	Michael Viggers Jr.	Episode: "Over the Water"
1975	Crime Club	Frank Swoboda	TV movie
1975	Knuckle	Curly	TV movie
1976	The Entertainer	Frank	TV movie
1976	The Last of Mrs. Lincoln	Robert Lincoln	TV movie
1977	The Andros Targets	Ron Comack	Episode: "The Surrender"
2010	Rubicon	Truxton Spangler	11 episodes
2012	Suits	Paul Porter	Episode: "The Choice"
2012–2013	Smash	Jerry Rand	15 episodes
2013–2014	American Horror Story: Coven	Harrison Renard	3 episodes
2013–2016	Ray Donovan	Father Daniel O'Connor	5 episodes
2014	Elementary	Isaac Pyke	Episode: "Bella"
2015–2019	Mr. Robot	Phillip Price	Main role
2024–present	Fallout	Elder Cleric Quintus	5 episodes
