= Carly Chaikin =

American actress

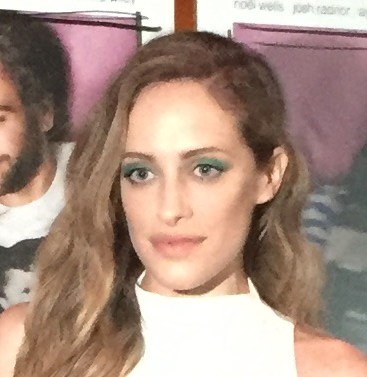
- Carly Chaikin at the premiere for Social Animals
- Born: Santa Monica, California, U.S.
- Occupation: Actress
- Years active: 2009–present
- Spouse: Ryan Bunnell (m. 2021; sep. 2023)

Carly Chaikin is an American actress. Her acting career began in 2009 and she received her breakout role two years later, co-starring as Dalia Royce in the ABC sitcom Suburgatory. She played the role until the series' cancellation in 2014, and one year later began playing the role of Darlene in the USA Network thriller drama series Mr. Robot.

== Early life ==
Chaikin was born in Santa Monica, California, to a cardiologist father and a psychotherapist mother. She was raised Jewish and has a sister. She attended The Archer School for Girls and the New Roads School. During this time she played a variety of sports, including volleyball, softball, basketball, and soccer.

== Career ==
=== 2009–2011: Early career ===
Chaikin knew she wanted to be an actress since she was 11. During high school, she decided to forgo college and dedicate herself to acting.

In 2009, Chaikin landed the role of Veronica in the film The Consultants, released December 4, 2010 in the US. The same year, Chaikin starred alongside Miley Cyrus in the film adaptation of Nicholas Sparks' The Last Song, initially released in the US on March 31, 2010. She played the role of Blaze, the antagonist of the film, a rebel that stirs up trouble for Ronnie, played by Cyrus.

=== 2011–2014: Early television work and Suburgatory ===
In 2011, Chaikin was cast as Dalia Oprah Royce in the ABC sitcom Suburgatory alongside Jeremy Sisto and Cheryl Hines. Chaikin's character, Dalia, was the mean girl to Jane Levy's Tessa, Her performance received universal acclaim; she quickly became a fan favorite and her performance a popular highlight of the show. Chaikin originally auditioned for the role of Tessa. Chaikin wrote a series of articles as her character, Dalia, for the magazine, Parade. As her character, Dalia, she shot a music video called "You Missed A Spot." In 2013, Chaikin was nominated for the Critics' Choice Television Award for Best Supporting Actress in a Comedy Series for her role in Suburgatory and was discussed as a potential Emmy nomination. The series ended its run on May 14, 2014.

Chaikin appeared in the 2012 independent film My Uncle Rafael starring John Michael Higgins.

In addition to acting, Chaikin is a writer and producer of short films, including Happy Fucking Birthday, and Nowhere to Go, which was honored at the First Glance Film Festival in 2013.

=== 2014–2019: Mr. Robot ===
In September 2014, Chaikin was cast in the USA Network TV series, Mr. Robot, starring Rami Malek ("Elliot") and Christian Slater ("Mr. Robot"). She plays the programmer Darlene, one of the show's central characters, who is a member of the fsociety group and writes malicious rootkit code. Chaikin auditioned for the roles of both Angela and Darlene. She said that it was a great pilot and that the bad-ass nature of the character really appealed to her. Mr. Robot has received widespread critical acclaim. At the 2015 SXSW film festival, the show won the Audience Award for Episodic TV shows. Chaikin was a series regular for all four seasons of Mr. Robot.

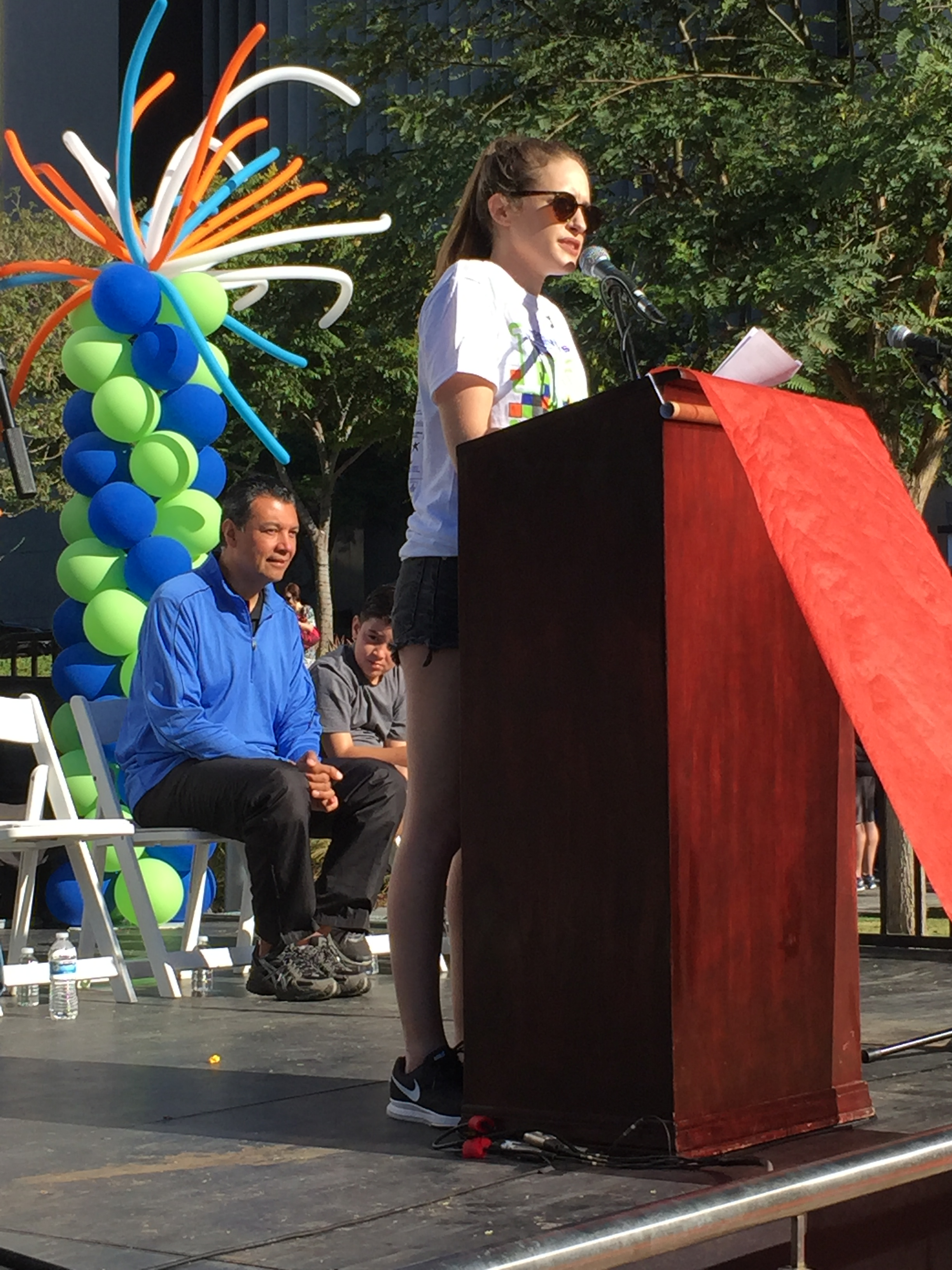
Chaikin, emceeing the 2016 NAMIWalks Los Angeles, and introducing Secretary of State Alex Padilla

During the five years Chaikin was involved with Mr. Robot, she also appeared in three independent films, the 2015 thriller Bad Blood, the 2017 comedy People You May Know, and the 2018 rom-com Social Animals, as well as filmed the currently unreleased film Last Moment of Clarity. In 2015, Chaikin guest-starred on Marc Maron's TV show, Maron, as Tina, a college teaching assistant whom Marc's friend (played by Adam Goldberg) has slept with. In 2019, she was featured in the New Years episode of Hulu's horror anthology Into the Dark. Additionally, Chaikin has been a guest judge on Project Runway two times; in season 15 (2016) and season 16 (2017).

=== 2020s ===
In February 2021, it was announced that Chaikin was developing her television series Messy with Miramax TV, with Chaikin writing, starring, and also showrunning with producer Liz Brixius.

== Personal life ==
Chaikin is also a painter, focusing on acrylics and oil, with some mixed media collage. Although she took painting classes growing up, Chaikin says that she is mostly self-taught.

In 2012 she had 11 tattoos, one of which features song lyrics by Bob Dylan.

Chaikin has been involved with the charitable organization National Alliance on Mental Illness, which conducts research and support for people and their families impacted by mental illness. She served as emcee of NAMIWalks in both 2016 and 2017, as well as raising money for the organization and matching incoming donations. She has recorded public service announcements for the group.

On September 3, 2018, Chaikin announced that she was engaged to her longtime boyfriend, television director Ryan Bunnell. The two wed in November 2021 and lived in Los Angeles together. In February 2023 Bunnell filed for divorce from Chaikin, citing irreconcilable differences.

== Filmography ==
=== Film ===
Year	Title	Role	Notes
2009	The Consultants	Veronica	
2010	The Last Song	Blaze	
2011	Escapee	Lynne Petersen	
2012	My Uncle Rafael	Kim	
2013	In a World...	Excruciating	
2015	Bad Blood	Frances	
2017	People You May Know	Oakley	
2018	Social Animals	Claire	
2020	Last Moment of Clarity	Kat	
2022	Daniel's Gotta Die	Jessica Powell	

=== Television ===
Year	Title	Role	Notes
2011–2014	Suburgatory	Dalia Royce	Main cast; 50 episodes
2012	Harder Than It Looks	Katie	2 episodes: "Sisters" and "The Tutors"
2012	NTSF:SD:SUV::	Brittany	Episode: "16 Hop Street"
2015	Maron	Tina	Episode: "Professor of Desire"
2015–2019	Mr. Robot	Darlene Alderson	Main cast; 44 episodes
2019	Into the Dark	Danielle Williams	Episode: "New Year, New You"

=== Shorts and web series ===
Year	Title	Role	Notes
2012	Harder Than It Looks	Katie	Web series; 2 episodes
2012	Nowhere to Go	Austyn	short film; also writer and executive producer
2013	Happy Fucking Birthday	Maddy McDowell	short film
2014	Dissonance	Julia	short film; also producer
2014	Literally		Hello Giggles shorts
2016	Into Me		short film; also writer, executive producer and editor

== Awards and nominations ==
Year	Award	Category	Nominated work	Result
2013	13th FirstGlance Film Fest Hollywood	Best Shorts Too (shared with Robert May)	Nowhere to Go	Won
2013	3rd Critics' Choice Television Awards	Best Supporting Actress in a Comedy Series	Suburgatory	Nominated
2013	15th Teen Choice Awards	Choice TV: Villain	Suburgatory	Nominated
