= 403 Forbidden (Mr. Robot) =

- Mr. Robot episode
- Episode no.: Season 4 Episode 3
- Directed by: Sam Esmail
- Written by: Courtney Looney
- Cinematography by: Tod Campbell
- Editing by: Melissa Lawson Cheung
- Original release date: October 20, 2019
- Running time: 47 minutes

Guest appearances
- Dominik García as Olivia Cortez; Jing Xu as Wang Shu; Eugene Shaw as Chen; Ross Kurt Le as Zhi Zhang; Jas Anderson as DJ; Gloria Reuben as Dr. Krista Gordon

Episode chronology
← Previous "402 Payment Required"	Next → "404 Not Found"

"403 Forbidden" is the third episode of the fourth season of the American drama thriller television series Mr. Robot. It is the 35th overall episode of the series and was written by co-producer Courtney Looney and directed by series creator Sam Esmail. It originally aired on USA Network on October 20, 2019.

The series follows Elliot Alderson, a cybersecurity engineer and hacker with social anxiety disorder, who is recruited by an insurrectionary anarchist known as "Mr. Robot" to join a group of hacktivists called "fsociety". As the series progresses, Elliot finds himself at odds with his real persona and with Mr. Robot's plans. In the episode, Elliot gets involved with one of Susan Jacobs' contacts, while Zhang's past is explored.

According to Nielsen Media Research, the episode was seen by an estimated 0.297 million household viewers and gained a 0.1 ratings share among adults aged 18–49. The episode received generally positive reviews from critics, with critics praising the performances and ending, but many criticized Elliot's subplot with Olivia, finding it tonally unfocused.

The title comes from the HTTP 403 status code meaning access to the requested resource is forbidden.

== Plot ==
In 1982, Zhang (Ross Kurt Le) and his partner, Chen, close a deal with an IBM executive to open facilities in Asia. Zhang and Chen are in a relationship, and both hope they can get to America to start a new life. However, Chen is forced to marry a woman he doesn't love against his will, but Zhang promises they'll eventually get together. Chen does not believe him and commits suicide in front of a horrified Zhang.

In the present, Zhang (BD Wong) accepts Price's resignation, as he plans to have Tyrell (Martin Wallström) promoted to CEO. He also tells his assistant to schedule a meeting with the Deus group the following day, Christmas Day, despite her protests. Elliot (Rami Malek) runs into Krista (Gloria Reuben) in the street, but she refuses to have anything to do with him despite his claims he is improving. At his hideout, Elliot is told by Darlene (Carly Chaikin) that Susan Jacobs had a contact called Olivia Cortez (Dominik García) at the Cyprus National Bank and decides to get into her apartment to hack her laptop.

Elliot finds out that Olivia is a recovering drug addict who is forced to share custody of her child with her ex-husband. Seeing that she is at a bar waiting for a date, Elliot decides to approach her, as she is carrying an important USB flash drive. Elliot opens up about his recent troubles and drug addiction, which moves Olivia. When her date finally arrives, Olivia gets ready to leave. Elliot decides to kiss her, and they end up having sex at her apartment.

Fernando Vera (Elliot Villar) now runs a drug smuggling operation at a butcher shop. He is approached by his henchman D.J. who has taken a photo of Elliot's meeting with Krista. When D.J. fails to show respect and proper information, Vera shoots him dead.

While Olivia is sleeping, Elliot gets a passcode he needs and sends it to Darlene. Olivia interrupts him, but does not catch him in the act. She opens up about her drug addiction ruining her life and that she has felt self-hatred for considering going back to drugs. Elliot relates to her feelings, also confessing that he planned to commit suicide a few months ago. While he goes back to Allsafe, Elliot notices a white van following him and decides to go home instead. Inside his apartment, he finds Tyrell, who says that Whiterose promoted him to CEO and that they can use this to their advantage. Elliot fails to warn Tyrell in time that the Dark Army are listening. They then look through the window, finding that the van is parked across the street.

== Production ==
=== Development ===
The episode was written by co-producer Courtney Looney and directed by series creator Sam Esmail. This was Looney's third writing credit, and Esmail's 28th directing credit.

== Reception ==
=== Viewers ===
In its original American broadcast, "403 Forbidden" was seen by an estimated 0.297 million household viewers with a 0.1 in the 18-49 demographics. This means that 0.1 percent of all households with televisions watched the episode. This was a 14% decrease in viewership from the previous episode, which was watched by an estimated 0.342 million household viewers with a 0.1 in the 18-49 demographics.

=== Critical reviews ===
"403 Forbidden" received generally positive reviews from critics. The review aggregator website Rotten Tomatoes reported an 100% approval rating for the episode, based on 8 reviews.

Alex McLevy of The A.V. Club gave the episode a "B–" grade and wrote, "'Forbidden' struggles to find the proper tone for its self-contained narrative, but that might be because the whole thing feels a bit rushed. After the gut punch opening story, the shift to Elliot and Robot's mission initially seems as though it's going to continue the adrenaline-laced rush to complete their objective before time runs out. The transition to a sweetly open-hearted story about two lonely souls finding each other, however briefly, on Christmas Eve doesn't quite land. It's awfully pat for a show that normally refuses such simplistic devices, and while simplicity can be a hallmark of honest emotional beats, here it's not given enough time to register as plausible."

Kyle Fowle of Entertainment Weekly wrote, "Whiterose is an enigma, a carefully curated persona, a power player, and a threat to humanity. But who is Whiterose really? '403 Forbidden' tries to fill in some of the details in a more than welcome flashback to her time before the Deus Group, and before world domination/destruction was her goal." Alicia Gilstorf of Telltale TV gave the episode a 3 star rating out of 5 and wrote, "Mr. Robot uses the reunion of this unusual duo to crafted another strong ending. But attempting to stand beside two incredibly ambitious episodes by selling us on young love doesn't completely work out in this show's favour."

Sean T. Collins of The New York Times wrote, "Titled '403 Forbidden', this installment of Mr. Robot has both the series's protagonist and antagonist putting themselves at risk in romance's name. In one case, it leads to disaster. In another... well, the season isn't over yet." Vikram Murthi of Vulture gave the episode a 4 star rating out of 5 and wrote, "It's rare that the series can pause and effectively tell a grounded story not beholden to outlandish rigmarole that frequently beggars belief. Thankfully, 'Forbidden,' written by Courtney Looney, features a simple premise and a compelling guest turn, and showcases a few different shades from our bug-eyed protagonist."

Lacy Braugher of Den of Geek gave the episode a 3.5 star rating out of 5 and wrote, "'Forbidden' doesn't exactly move the needle on many of Mr. Robot season 4's plotlines. We're inching towards a meeting of the shadowy Deus group, but we still have no idea what's going on with the (assumed) third alternate personality in Elliot's head, and there's been little progression on Dom's Dark Army mission, the details of Whiterose's ultimate plan, or even exactly what Fernando Vera is up to. Yet, this is also the sort of story Mr. Robot excels at, which focuses on the why of things, much more so than the specifics behind them." Paul Dailly of TV Fanatic gave the episode a 4.5 star rating out of 5 and wrote, "A full hour about the origins of Whiterose would have been worthwhile. At the top of 'Forbidden', it seemed like that's what we were getting, but this show loves to play with expectations."
