= 402 Payment Required (Mr. Robot) =

- Mr. Robot episode
- Episode no.: Season 4 Episode 2
- Directed by: Sam Esmail
- Written by: Kyle Bradstreet
- Cinematography by: Tod Campbell
- Editing by: Joel T. Pashby
- Original release date: October 13, 2019
- Running time: 47 minutes

Guest appearances
- Evan Whitten as Young Elliot; Vaishnavi Sharma as Magda Alderson; Jing Xu as Wang Shu; Alex Morf as Deegan McGuire; Garth Kravits as Agent Horton

Episode chronology
← Previous "401 Unauthorized"	Next → "403 Forbidden"

"402 Payment Required" is the second episode of the fourth season of the American drama thriller television series Mr. Robot. It is the 34th overall episode of the series and was written by executive producer Kyle Bradstreet and directed by series creator Sam Esmail. It originally aired on USA Network on October 13, 2019. The title refers to the HTTP response status code "HTTP 402 Payment Required".

The series follows Elliot Alderson, a cybersecurity engineer and hacker with social anxiety disorder, who is recruited by an insurrectionary anarchist known as "Mr. Robot" to join a group of hacktivists called "fsociety". As the series progresses, Elliot finds himself at odds with his real persona and with Mr. Robot's plans. In the episode, Elliot learns about a powerful worldwide group, with Price's help.

According to Nielsen Media Research, the episode was seen by an estimated 0.342 million household viewers and gained a 0.1 ratings share among adults aged 18–49. The episode received extremely positive reviews from critics, who praised the character development and ending reveal.

== Plot ==
At his hideout, Price (Michael Cristofer) explains to Elliot (Rami Malek) that after the fall of the Berlin Wall, Zhang (BD Wong) decided to unite the wealthiest people in the world to form an investment group called Deus. Their power increased thanks to the rise of Internet, but Whiterose was actually using the funds to form the Dark Army and build a machine at the power plant. Elliot wants Price's help in overthrowing Whiterose, aware that Price needed him because he revived him. Price is skeptical of their chances of success, but reveals that Susan Jacobs had ties with the Deus group's funds before her disappearance. Elliot sets out to find her, unaware that Darlene (Carly Chaikin) killed her. He is called by Darlene, who tells him that their mother has just died.

Elliot and Darlene pack their mother's belongings, not grieving over her death because of her mistreatment of them. Darlene discovers a safety deposit box, which their mother never told them about. While arranging her coffin, Darlene pressures Elliot in accompanying her to the bank. The bank reveals that her deposit was thrown out when she stopped sending payments, which annoys Darlene. She then confronts Elliot over not grieving for Angela's death, which Elliot refutes. Elliot shows her a walkman he retrieved from their mother's apartment, which contains a voice message they left for Angela's mother as kids.

While being questioned over Santiago's death, Dominique (Grace Gummer) states that Santiago was a double agent, but lies by claiming that he worked for a cartel. She reports this to Janice (Ashlie Atkinson), who declares it to be "99.9%" successful. Later, Dominique finds a news report saying that her questioner committed suicide. Janice informs her that she is responsible, as she should've been more careful and get a "100%".

Price visits Zhang to announce that he will retire as CEO, which angers Zhang as Deus needs to find a successor for him within seven days. Price does not care about the repercussions, as he does not want to be involved with the Dark Army anymore. Price calls Elliot to inform him, as the search for a successor will require a meeting with the Deus group. Darlene confesses to Elliot that she killed Susan Jacobs, enraging him. When he tells her that he will go after Whiterose, Darlene agrees to help him despite the risky situation. However, she tells Elliot that she assumed that the way he had been acting had something to do with Fernando Vera (Elliot Villar), whom Darlene ran into outside Elliot’s apartment several months prior. This confuses Elliot, as he cannot recall any conversation about Vera ever since he fled New York and vanished some time ago. Darlene asks Elliot if she needs to be worried about Vera, but Elliot assures her it’s nothing. He angrily confronts Mr. Robot (Christian Slater) over keeping the information about Vera from him, but the latter says he does not know about it either. In a flashback at E Corp, (Note: It is later made apparent in "409 Conflict" that the sequence takes place within Elliot's mind.) Elliot's mother tells a younger version of himself to wait for "the other one."

== Production ==
The episode was written by executive producer Kyle Bradstreet and directed by series creator Sam Esmail. This was Bradstreet's seventh writing credit, and Esmail's 27th directing credit.

== Reception ==
=== Viewers ===
In its original American broadcast, "402 Payment Required" was seen by an estimated 0.342 million household viewers with a 0.1 in the 18-49 demographics. This means that 0.1 percent of all households with televisions watched the episode. This was a 23% decrease in viewership from the previous episode, which was watched by an estimated 0.444 million household viewers with a 0.1 in the 18-49 demographics.

=== Critical reviews ===
"402 Payment Required" received extremely positive reviews from critics. The review aggregator website Rotten Tomatoes reported an 100% approval rating for the episode, based on 8 reviews.

Alex McLevy of The A.V. Club gave the episode a "B+" grade and wrote, "A solid episode of Mr. Robot ended with the biggest rug-pull the show has done since its freshman year, and it wasn't even a single tug. It yanked the rug out from under us, knocked us against the wall, stood us back up, and then yanked it again."

Kyle Fowle of Entertainment Weekly wrote, "'402 Payment Required' does a masterful job of fluctuating between dread and optimism, between shades of the paranoid thriller and more emotional family drama." Alicia Gilstorf of Telltale TV gave the episode a 4 star rating out of 5 and wrote, "4 years of thinking we know what's going on and we still don't. This latest reveal confirms what we've always suspected — Mr. Robot is by far the smartest series on television."

Sean T. Collins of The New York Times wrote, "So there's another personality buried in Elliot somewhere — an echo of the Deus Group, a true power behind it all. Adding additional layers to an already complicated plot is tricky business, of course. But the mysteries are so intriguing, and Esmail's command of his craft so sure, that the investment seems sound as a pound." Vikram Murthi of Vulture gave the episode a 4 star rating out of 5 and wrote, "As Elliot re-enters the deep end of hacker terrorists and global crises, he suddenly has another person on his hands, and no one to squeeze his hand to tell him that everything's going to be okay."

Alec Bojalad of Den of Geek gave the episode a 3.5 star rating out of 5 and wrote, "Sometimes the anticipation before the action is what really delights dopamine receptors. That's what 'Payment Required' seems to be going for. It mostly succeeds in its artistic stall tactics but then again: Elliot Alderson has eight days to live." Paul Dailly of TV Fanatic gave the episode a perfect 5 star rating out of 5 and wrote, "There are so many unanswered questions right now, but Mr. Robot Season 4 is firing from all cylinders. Any episode that has Whiterose tearing down the Christmas tree he just decorated in a fit of rage is a success in my book."
