= 406 Not Acceptable (Mr. Robot) =

- Mr. Robot episode
- Episode no.: Season 4 Episode 6
- Directed by: Sam Esmail
- Written by: Amelia Gray
- Cinematography by: Tod Campbell
- Editing by: Joel T. Pashby
- Original release date: November 10, 2019
- Running time: 46 minutes

Guest appearances
- Joey Badass as Leon; Dominik García as Olivia Cortez; Young M.A as Peanuts; Jing Xu as Wang Shu; Gloria Reuben as Dr. Krista Gordon

Episode chronology
← Previous "405 Method Not Allowed"	Next → "407 Proxy Authentication Required"

"406 Not Acceptable" is the sixth episode of the fourth season of the American drama thriller television series Mr. Robot. It is the 38th overall episode of the series and was written by Amelia Gray and directed by series creator Sam Esmail. It originally aired on USA Network on November 10, 2019.

The series follows Elliot Alderson, a cybersecurity engineer and hacker with social anxiety disorder, who is recruited by an insurrectionary anarchist known as "Mr. Robot" to join a group of hacktivists called "fsociety". As the series progresses, Elliot finds himself at odds with his real persona and with Mr. Robot's plans. In the episode, Elliot is forced to blackmail Olivia, while Vera kidnaps Krista.

According to Nielsen Media Research, the episode was seen by an estimated 0.366 million household viewers and gained a 0.1 ratings share among adults aged 18–49. The episode received extremely positive reviews from critics, praising the themes and performance, but many criticizing Vera's subplot.

== Plot ==
Fernando Vera (Elliot Villar) has tied Krista (Gloria Reuben) to a chair, keeping her hostage at her apartment. He narrates a story of his childhood, relating that Krista needs to supply him with information about Elliot (Rami Malek) in order to "own" him. After Vera threatens her boyfriend's life, Krista gives him a folder with Elliot's information, which mentions Mr. Robot (Christian Slater).

Elliot meets Leon (Joey Badass) at a coffee shop, where the latter supplies him with drugs. He then meets with Olivia (Dominik García), giving her a coffee which she drinks. He suddenly reveals that her clients are involved with the Deus group and that he hacked her, asking for her help in stopping Deus. When she refuses, Elliot reveals that he dosed her coffee with drugs, forcing her to cooperate or she will lose custody of her son.

As Darlene (Carly Chaikin) prepares to meet with Elliot, she is captured by Dominique (Grace Gummer), who tracked her to Angela's apartment. She informs Janice (Ashlie Atkinson), who orders her to kill Darlene as their priority is Elliot, threatening to kill Dominique's family if she does not comply. Dominique takes Darlene to the bathtub, where Darlene pleads for her life and suggests teaming up to take down the Dark Army. Conflicted, Dominique only knocks her unconscious rather than kill her. Before Janice and her Dark Army agents arrive, Dominique wakes Darlene up and asks her to kill her so her family is spared, which Darlene refuses to do. Janice demands Darlene's phone, but she reveals she has wiped it.

Olivia calls her boss, who will report back in a few moments. She converses with Elliot, expressing her disdain over her actions as she could relapse into drug abuse even if he fixed her records. Elliot says she should have quit her job due to the suspected crimes happening off the record and that Deus uses people like her for its own purposes. Olivia leaves for the bathroom, where she slits her wrists. Elliot intervenes and stops the bleeding, and Olivia discovers that Deus was involved in her mother's death. She decides to talk with her boss, and Elliot hacks his password and access to the Cyprus National Bank. Olivia then kicks him out, calling him a monster who is not aware of his actions.

Elliot is called by Krista, warning him about Vera and asks for a meeting. Elliot knows Vera is setting him up, but goes to the location anyway, where he is abducted by Vera's henchmen.

== Production ==
=== Development ===
The episode was written by Amelia Gray and directed by series creator Sam Esmail. This was Gray's first writing credit, and Esmail's 31st directing credit.

== Reception ==
=== Viewers ===
In its original American broadcast, "406 Not Acceptable" was seen by an estimated 0.366 million household viewers with a 0.1 in the 18-49 demographics. This means that 0.1 percent of all households with televisions watched the episode. This was a 16% increase in viewership from the previous episode, which was watched by an estimated 0.314 million household viewers with a 0.1 in the 18-49 demographics.

=== Critical reviews ===
"406 Not Acceptable" received extremely positive reviews from critics. The review aggregator website Rotten Tomatoes reported an 100% approval rating for the episode, based on 8 reviews.

Alex McLevy of The A.V. Club gave the episode a "B+" grade and wrote, "What makes it gripping is the same thing that makes it frustrating: We are barreling towards the endgame of the show, but there's so much going on, it feels like a disservice to these characters and stories to rush through them so quickly, even if it quickens the pulse. Vera is the most obvious case: It's hard to see him as anything but a roadblock to the actual story, an obnoxious interlocutor (no mater [sic] how poetically he speaks) dragging us away from the eventual showdown with Whiterose and the Deus group."

Kyle Fowle of Entertainment Weekly wrote, "I'm really starting to think that Sam Esmail and company might follow through and deliver a truly bleak ending to this show. Everyone is hurtling towards oblivion, and it's hard to see a way out." Alicia Gilstorf of Telltale TV gave the episode a 4.5 star rating out of 5 and wrote, "This latest installment solidifies the degree of talent this cast has to offer and the lack of protagonists we have to root for. But with a cast of characters so good at being bad, it's hard to be upset by that fact."

Sean T. Collins of The New York Times wrote, "This week's episode of Mr. Robot was all about that ugly feeling. It divides its time between three situations in which characters are held against their will, desperate to find a way out, waiting to see what their captor will do next. Throw in the composer Mac Quayle's increasingly ominous score and the cinematographer Tod Campbell's confidently stark camera work and you have a recipe for a very black Christmas indeed." Vikram Murthi of Vulture gave the episode a 4 star rating out of 5 and wrote, "It's unfortunate that the Elliot/Olivia material so far outpaces the quality of the other two stories this week, but even taken as its own entity, the Vera/Krista face-off definitely drags 'Not Acceptable' down a bit."

Lacy Braugher of Den of Geek gave the episode a 3.5 star rating out of 5 and wrote, "with Vera now aware of Mr. Robot's existence, perhaps we'll finally get back to that mystery of whether or not there's a third personality in this saga that we haven't officially met yet. That would certainly be worth the narrative detour we're heading down – and maybe it's how everything comes back together in the end, too." Paul Dailly of TV Fanatic gave the episode a 3.5 star rating out of 5 and wrote, "'Not Acceptable' was the slowest episode of the season. It wasn't bad, but there were many plots that felt too convenient to take seriously."
