= 405 Method Not Allowed (Mr. Robot) =

- Mr. Robot episode
- Elliot and Darlene break into Virtual Realty to hack their server farm.
- Episode no.: Season 4 Episode 5
- Directed by: Sam Esmail
- Written by: Sam Esmail
- Original air date: November 3, 2019
- Running time: 49 minutes

Guest appearances
- Young M.A. as Peanuts; Liz Larsen as Trudy; Gloria Reuben as Krista Gordon

Episode chronology
← Previous "404 Not Found"	Next → "406 Not Acceptable"

"405 Method Not Allowed" is the fifth episode in the fourth season of the American thriller drama television series Mr. Robot. Written and directed by series creator Sam Esmail, it aired on November 3, 2019, on USA Network.

The series follows Elliot Alderson, a cybersecurity engineer and hacker with social anxiety disorder, who is recruited by an insurrectionary anarchist known as "Mr. Robot" to join a group of hacktivists called "fsociety". As the series progresses, Elliot finds himself at odds with his real persona and with Mr. Robot's plans. In the episode, which is set on Christmas Day, Elliot and his sister Darlene (Carly Chaikin) attempt a heist hack at a server farm.

"405 Method Not Allowed" is notably presented without dialogue for almost its entire length. Only three lines are spoken in total: "It's cool, dude. We don't have to talk" during the opening scene, and "It's time we talk" right before the credits. It received positive reviews from critics.

== Plot ==
On Christmas morning, Elliot burns the van and is picked up by Darlene. Posing as employees, they break into Virtual Realty, the company that keeps the servers for Cyprus National Bank. Elliot installs a firmware hack that gives them 40 minutes to get the information they need while temporarily disabling the security cameras. On nearly getting caught, Elliot triggers a power outage which aids their escape. The security team call the police when they realize the site has been infiltrated, but only spot Elliot, not Darlene. He leads the police on a foot chase through Central Park. Darlene is able to walk out, now posing as a gym attendee, and picks up Elliot after he is hit by a car and leaps over a guard rail.

Janice sends Dominique to the local police department to give the Dark Army control over the investigation into the burned-out van. While she meets up with her family, the Central Park incident is on the news. Janice sends her out again to capture Darlene and Elliot, seen on a traffic camera. Elliot texts Price that Tyrell won't be coming to the meeting. Price follows clues to the location of the Deus Group meeting that night, and replies that it will happen with or without Tyrell. Krista is then confronted by Vera and his henchmen outside her apartment.

The episode has almost no dialogue, apart from its opening and ending, beginning with "It's cool, dude. We don't have to talk" (Darlene to Elliot) and ending with "It's time we talk" (Vera to Krista).

== Production ==
Series creator Sam Esmail and the show had become known for its defiance of the television format, such as a one-take episode and another with an opening sitcom sequence. Instead of using dialogue, the show depends on text messages and action to tell its story. Esmail said that, in production, the story dictated the format. They knew the plot would center on hacking Virtual Realty and as they worked through the story, realized that Elliot and Darlene would have a coldness between each other, both for the need to be silent and because Darlene would still be mad at Elliot from a prior fight. That the pair would have a silent treatment seemed appropriate to Esmail. They then worked backwards to realize that the episode's other storylines were also silent on Christmas morning. The writers also wanted the silence to contribute to the tension. Each of the subordinate storylines was foreboding, with the viewer left in suspense while knowing what would become of Dom's red light hack and Vera's minions stalking Krista. While the episode lacked dialogue, it was not fully silent, as it remained soundtracked.

Esmail saw this ability to make a stylistic format choice as one of the perks of working in television over feature film, the originally intended format of the show, as the stylistic choice can last for an individual episodic chapter. The silent treatment conceit, Esmail added, additionally expressed isolation as a result of technology, a core theme of the show, with the characters texting rather than talking.

== Reception ==
The New York Times was "enthralled" by the episode's silence, which it described as functional for the purpose of the hack. Reviewers wrote that the lack of dialogue enhanced other aspects of the presentation, such as the viewer's perception of danger and the significance of the characters' actions, similar to the effect of Buffy the Vampire Slayer's "Hush", which was also without dialogue. The New York Times also praised the episode's cinematography in the absence of dialogue, especially in the dark server room lit by server equipment and in the shot descending the staircase. The stairwell shot was also The A.V. Club's favorite. Rolling Stone did not notice the absence of dialogue until after the episode, and cited the episode as an example where the "gimmickry" felt "seamless rather than self-indulgent".

With focus on the action and thrill, The A.V. Club thought the show delivered, balancing "apprehension and anxiety" as teased perils turn out to be planned and small errors lead to catastrophic escalation. The New York Times appreciated the running contrast between joyous Christmas music and the characters' stress levels. The New York Times also appreciated how Mr. Robot did not appear either for dialogue or to present Elliot with a way out, but Elliot's jumping from the cliff to meet Darlene did mirror how he thought Mr. Robot pushed him from the Coney Island boardwalk railing. This scene reinforced the show's balance of apprehension and anxiety while underscoring the familial understanding and forgiveness between the siblings, said The A.V. Club.

It was also a Christmas episode notably spent away from usual Christmas elements, such as the tree and shopping.
