= 404 Not Found (Mr. Robot) =

- Mr. Robot episode
- Elliot Alderson, Mr. Robot and Tyrell Wellick wander lost in the woods.
- Episode no.: Season 4 Episode 4
- Directed by: Sam Esmail
- Written by: Kyle Bradstreet
- Cinematography by: Tod Campbell
- Editing by: Justin Krohn
- Original release date: October 27, 2019
- Running time: 49 minutes

Guest appearances
- Jon Glaser as Tobias; Roberta Colindrez as Happyhardonhenry806

Episode chronology
← Previous "403 Forbidden"	Next → "405 Method Not Allowed"

"404 Not Found" is the fourth episode of the fourth season of the American drama thriller television series Mr. Robot. It is the 36th overall episode of the series and was written by executive producer Kyle Bradstreet and directed by series creator Sam Esmail. It originally aired on USA Network on October 27, 2019.

The series follows Elliot Alderson, a cybersecurity engineer and hacker with social anxiety disorder, who is recruited by an insurrectionary anarchist known as "Mr. Robot" to join a group of hacktivists called "fsociety". As the series progresses, Elliot finds himself at odds with his real persona and with Mr. Robot's plans. In the episode, Elliot and Tyrell get stranded in the woods while fleeing from the Dark Army.

According to Nielsen Media Research, the episode was seen by an estimated 0.348 million household viewers and gained a 0.1 ratings share among adults aged 18–49. The episode received critical acclaim, with critics praising the episode's atmosphere, directing, performances and character development.

== Plot ==
A Dark Army agent overhears the conversation between Elliot (Rami Malek) and Tyrell (Martin Wallström) from the white van. As he prepares to ambush them, Tyrell knocks him unconscious with a hammer. After the man dies, they decide to escape in his van. When Elliot fails to show up at Allsafe, Darlene (Carly Chaikin) goes to his apartment, discovering his note and decides to track his location.

Elliot and Tyrell go to a gas station, intending to burn the body. However, while they are inside the station, they discover that the van has disappeared. As there is no service in the area, they are forced to leave through the woods to a nearby town, but they end up getting lost. As Elliot and Tyrell clash over their lifestyles, they realize they have returned to the gas station. Darlene tries to hijack a car, but is confronted by the car's owner, a drunk man named Tobias (Jon Glaser) wearing a Santa Claus costume. Tobias agrees to let her take his car if she drives him home, since he is drunk. Alone on Christmas Eve, Dominique (Grace Gummer) gets into a sex chat group, where she decides to invite a female user to come over.

While driving, Darlene learns more about Tobias. He is a children's hospital volunteer, seemingly depressed from the nature of his volunteer work, and he alludes to an accident involving his wife. As he is carrying both liquor and Percocet, Darlene suspects he intends to commit suicide. As they arrive at his house, they see Tobias' car already parked in the driveway, and realize that Darlene has inadvertently stolen someone else's car. Not wanting to leave him alone, Darlene confronts him on his behavior. Tobias explains that his wife is alive and well, having merely hurt her back while decorating their house together, hence the Percocet; he does not want to commit suicide, Darlene having misinterpreted his statements. When Tobias surmises that Darlene may herself be in need of help, she shares that she is concerned about her brother Elliot's safety, as he is the only family she has left. He listens, and says that he hopes her brother is safe. As the drunken Tobias returns inside and is greeted by his wife, Darlene leaves to search for Elliot, but is forced to pull over on the side of the road when she has a panic attack.

Dominique welcomes the woman (Roberta Colindrez), but gets panicked when they kiss. When she goes to the bathroom, the woman enters wearing a Dark Army mask and starts to drown her. Dominique suddenly wakes up, revealing that the whole episode was a nightmare she had.

When Christmas officially arrives, Elliot and Tyrell have another argument, in which Tyrell accuses Elliot of not caring for him, which he concedes. Elliot prepares to leave Tyrell, feeling he doesn't need him. As Mr. Robot (Christian Slater) talks about loneliness, Elliot returns. He proclaims that he only cares for Darlene's safety, but does not want to abandon Tyrell. They continue walking, finding that the van killed a deer on the road. As they inspect the van, the Dark Army agent shoots at them from inside before killing himself. However, Tyrell has been shot. Refusing Elliot's attempt to take him to a hospital, Tyrell instructs him to set fire to the van and take care of Whiterose. Tyrell then walks off into the woods, until he comes across a shining blue light in the ground, and the screen fades to white as he dies.

== Production ==
=== Development ===
The episode was written by executive producer Kyle Bradstreet and directed by series creator Sam Esmail. This was Bradstreet's eighth writing credit, and Esmail's 29th directing credit.

== Reception ==
=== Viewers ===
In its original American broadcast, "404 Not Found" was seen by an estimated 0.348 million household viewers with a 0.1 in the 18-49 demographics. This means that 0.1 percent of all households with televisions watched the episode. This was a 17% increase in viewership from the previous episode, which was watched by an estimated 0.297 million household viewers with a 0.1 in the 18-49 demographics.

=== Critical reviews ===
"404 Not Found" received critical acclaim. The review aggregator website Rotten Tomatoes reported an 100% approval rating for the episode, based on 7 reviews.

Alex McLevy of The A.V. Club gave the episode an "A–" grade and wrote, "That realization of the hollowness at the heart of identity comes to Tyrell Wellick in a rush toward the end of 'Not Found,' as his frustrations and fears are peeled back to confront him with the fact that he's lost whatever gave his life meaning."

Kyle Fowle of Entertainment Weekly wrote, "Loss, death, The Great Void, emptiness: it all hangs over 'Not Found.' An appropriate title, as our heroes wander in the night, their Christmas Eves hardly a time for celebration, but rather a rumination on the meaninglessness of, well, everything." Alicia Gilstorf of Telltale TV gave the episode a 3 star rating out of 5 and wrote, "'Not Found' may not completely succeed in its mission, but it does send Elliot down an intriguing new path to explore before the new year. Here's to hoping this season works to regain some of that fiery passion it wowed us with during the earlier episodes."

Sean T. Collins of The New York Times wrote, "Arguably the strangest, most volatile character on Mr. Robot is given a moment of beauty and grace before dying, at the end of one of the show's strangest and most deeply empathetic episodes." Vikram Murthi of Vulture gave the episode a perfect 5 star rating out of 5 and wrote, "'Not Found,' the best episode of this final season so far, sends off Tyrell on the highest note possible. Credited writer Kyle Bradstreet crafts a 'Pine Barrens'–esque episode in which Tyrell kills a Dark Army soldier who has bugged Elliot's apartment, forcing him, Elliot, and Mr. Robot to drive the soldier's van upstate to dispose of the evidence." Lacy Braugher of Den of Geek gave the episode a 4 star rating out of 5 and wrote, "Happy holidays from Mr. Robot, which seems as unconcerned as ever with actually wrapping up any aspect of its final season's story. In place of the answers — or at the very least, minimal forward plot progression — we likely expected here, 'Not Found' instead offers us a bizarre holiday tale, in which Elliot, Darlene, Dom and Tyrell face down some demons of both the literal and figurative variety on Christmas Eve."
