= 401 Unauthorized (Mr. Robot) =

- Mr. Robot episode
- Episode no.: Season 4 Episode 1
- Directed by: Sam Esmail
- Written by: Sam Esmail
- Cinematography by: Tod Campbell
- Editing by: Rosanne Tan
- Original release date: October 6, 2019
- Running time: 60 minutes

Guest appearances
- Jake Busey as Freddy Lomax; Evan Whitten as Young Elliot; Nadia Gan as Elizabeth; Vaishnavi Sharma as Magda Alderson; Liz Larsen as Trudy; Jing Xu as Wang Shu

Episode chronology
← Previous "shutdown-r"	Next → "402 Payment Required"

"401 Unauthorized" is the first episode of the fourth season of the American drama thriller television series Mr. Robot. It is the 33rd overall episode of the series and was written and directed by series creator Sam Esmail. It originally aired on USA Network on October 6, 2019.

The series follows Elliot Alderson, a cybersecurity engineer and hacker with social anxiety disorder, who is recruited by an insurrectionary anarchist known as "Mr. Robot" to join a group of hacktivists called "fsociety". As the series progresses, Elliot finds himself at odds with his real persona and with Mr. Robot's plans. In the episode, Elliot works in taking down Whiterose, while Angela fails to persuade Price from joining her against Whiterose.

According to Nielsen Media Research, the episode was seen by an estimated 0.444 million household viewers and gained a 0.1 ratings share among adults aged 18–49. The episode received critical acclaim, with critics praising the episode's twists, performances and writing.

The title comes from the "HTTP 401 Unauthorized" status code.

== Plot ==
After discovering that Price (Michael Cristofer) is her father, Angela (Portia Doubleday) tries to get him to take revenge on Whiterose (BD Wong). Price refuses to get involved, telling Angela to move on. Angela states she will work to expose Whiterose's plan, which Price fails to persuade her from doing. Defeated, Price walks away. Angela is then approached by Dark Army agents, as Whiterose had Price wear a wire. They kill Angela with gunshots to the head. A grief-stricken Price blames Whiterose for recruiting her, with Whiterose saying that Elliot (Rami Malek) will be used for their plan until December, and then they will kill him.

At the Lomax & Looney Law firm Christmas party, a lawyer named Freddy Lomax (Jake Busey) receives an envelope containing an incriminating video of him contacting a minor for sexual favors. He is then called by Mr. Robot (Christian Slater), who threatens to send the video to the FBI and his family if he does not put his email inbox on a USB flash drive. He is then instructed to go to Grand Central Terminal, where he meets Elliot on a train. The contents of the USB drive reveals that Whiterose uses Cyprus National Bank and a man named John Garcin for her purposes. Realizing that Dark Army agents followed them, Elliot instructs Freddy to leave and meet later. However, Freddy realizes that he will not be able to escape from the Dark Army, and despite Elliot's protests, commits suicide.

In the aftermath of the 5/9 hack having been undone, the economy has recovered and Tyrell (Martin Wallström) is praised as a hero. However, he has become bored and sullen over his CTO position, as he is only a puppet. Dominique (Grace Gummer) now lives with her mother, Trudy (Liz Larsen) and has grown paranoid over the Dark Army's presence in her life. Elliot is working from the empty Allsafe offices, with his relationship with Darlene (Carly Chaikin) deteriorating following Angela's death. Due to her drug addiction, she believes that Angela might still be alive. Elliot is not willing to show Darlene a photo of Angela's murdered body that Whiterose sent him.

Trudy sets up Dominique with Janice (Ashlie Atkinson), a woman she met at church. Janice reveals she works for the Dark Army, threatening Trudy's life if Dominique does not start following instructions. She also suggests that there are more agents watching her. Elliot and Mr. Robot check Garcin's apartment, only to discover that Freddy set them up and that Garcin never existed. Elliot is then captured by Dark Army agents who inject him with a lethal drug dose, causing him to lose consciousness and experience flashbacks. Suddenly, Elliot is revived by the agents. Price appears, welcoming him back.

== Production ==
The episode was written and directed by series creator Sam Esmail. This was Esmail's 18th writing credit, and 26th directing credit.

== Reception ==
=== Viewers ===
In its original American broadcast, "401 Unauthorized" was seen by an estimated 0.444 million household viewers with a 0.1 in the 18-49 demographics. This means that 0.1 percent of all households with televisions watched the episode. This was a slight decrease in viewership from the previous episode, which was watched by an estimated 0.454 million household viewers with a 0.2 in the 18-49 demographics.

=== Critical reviews ===
"401 Unauthorized" received critical acclaim. The review aggregator website Rotten Tomatoes reported an 89% approval rating for the episode, based on 9 reviews.

Alex McLevy of The A.V. Club gave the episode a "B+" grade and wrote, "'Unauthorized' isn't just the first episode in the show's history to not have its title formatted in the form of a computer file or program; it's also a thrilling return to the espionage-thriller excitement that drove much of the first season."

Kyle Fowle of Entertainment Weekly wrote, "The entirety of '401 Unauthorized' is an extended heart attack. It's a perfect conspiracy thriller that sees Mr. Robot assuring us that this final season is going to reckon with everything that came before and that nothing will ever be the same. Everything, and everyone, is falling apart." Alicia Gilstorf of Telltale TV gave the episode a perfect 5 star rating out of 5 and wrote, "This premiere is a harsh reminder of Mr. Robot's brilliance and its incessant need to burn the world we love to the ground one episode at a time."

Sean T. Collins of The New York Times wrote, "It starts with the death of a main character. It seems, at first, to end with the death of the main character. In between, it plays out like an eerie paranoid thriller against a backdrop of international corruption and capitalism run amok. Written and directed by the series's creator, Sam Esmail, the fourth and final season premiere of Mr. Robot plays to all the show's strengths and none of its weaknesses." Vikram Murthi of Vulture gave the episode a 4 star rating out of 5 and wrote, "'401 Unauthorized' continues Esmail's commitment to simplify Mr. Robot's narrative. The episode primarily follows Elliot's pursuit of Whiterose, for whom he has ostensibly been searching since she sent Elliot a picture of Angela's corpse. Yet Esmail introduces Elliot's scheme in a compellingly indirect manner, mainly through a new character not long for this world."

Alec Bojalad of Den of Geek gave the episode a perfect 5 star rating out of 5 and wrote, "There have certainly been better episodes of Mr. Robot throughout the show's run. But it's hard to recall one with a mission so singular or a plot so gleefully propulsive. 'Unauthorized' seems as though it's Mr. Robot For Dummies. The battle lines are drawn, the stakes are clear, and all that's left for Sam Esmail is to slam down on the gas with both feet. There isn't much time for mummer's tricks. There's a world to be saved, damn it." Paul Dailly of TV Fanatic gave the episode a 4 star rating out of 5 and wrote, "Viewers have been expecting it since her rise up the ranks on Mr. Robot Season 2, and given how Mr. Robot Season 3 concluded, it certainly felt like a full-circle moment to end her storyline on 'Unauthorized.'"
