= Maciej Zieliński =

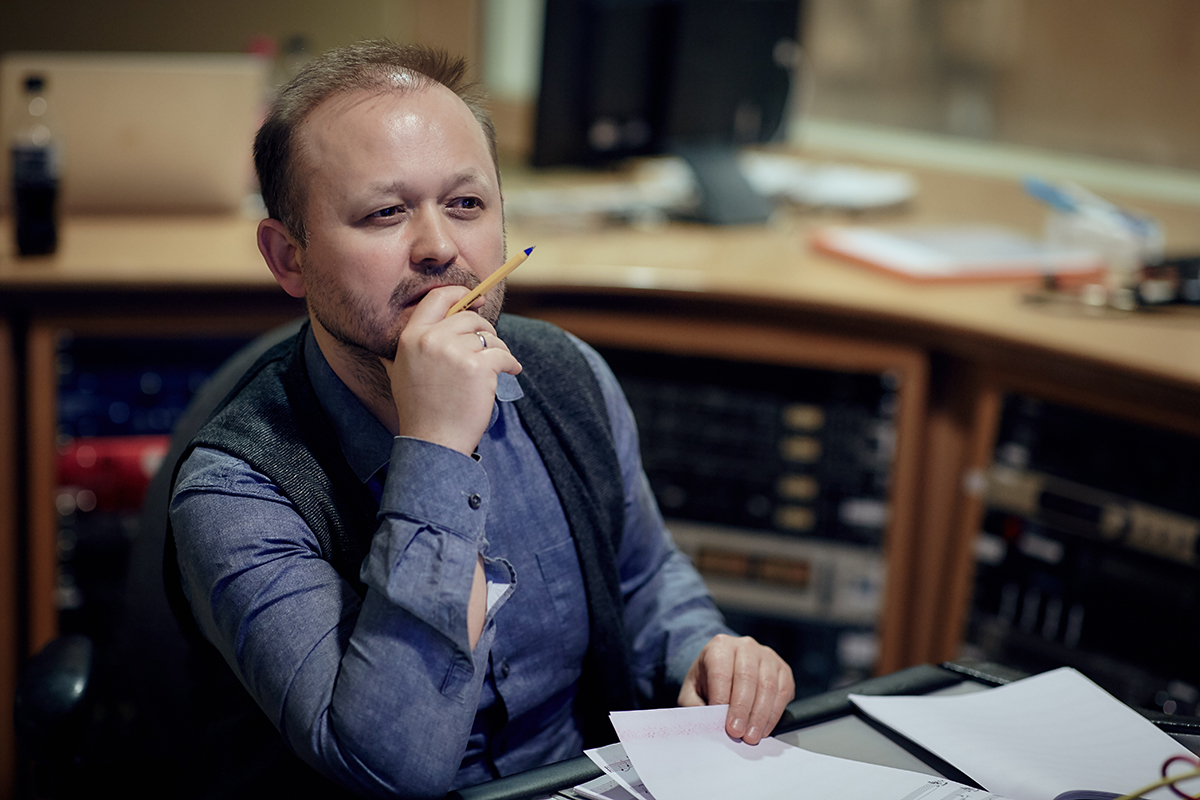
- Zieliński at a recording session
- Born: Maciej Tadeusz Zieliński; 29 March 1971 (age 55); Warsaw, Poland
- Education: Frederic Chopin Academy of Music, Warsaw; Royal Academy of Music, London
- Occupations: Composer; arranger; songwriter; music producer
- Years active: 1991-present
- Musical career
- Also known as: Greenski
- Genres: Contemporary Classical Music; Film score; Popular Music; Electronic; Jazz
- Instruments: piano; keyboards; clarinet
- Formerly of: Polish Radio Symphony Orchestra
- Website: polishcomposer.com

Maciej Zielinski (born March 29, 1971) is the award-winning Polish composer, arranger and music producer, known for his contemporary classical and film scores, songs and original television music. His contemporary classical music has been awarded at 8 composers’ contests, including two international competitions and it was performed at many international festivals, including the Warsaw Autumn Festival and ISCM World Music Days. He has written scores for popular Polish movies and for independent US productions. In 2019 he received "Best Score" award at the "New Filmmakers LA Awards" in Los Angeles and nomination for "Crystal Pine Award" at the International Sound and Film Music Festival in Croatia. In 2016, 2017, and 2020 he received nominations for the Polish Film Academy Award - "Eagle" (Polish: Polskie Nagrody Filmowe: Orły) in "Best Music" category. In 2012 he was nominated for "Fryderyk" – the Polish Society of the Phonographic Industry (Związek Producentów Audio-Video, ZPAV) in the category "Composer of the Year". His music has been released on nearly 30 albums.

== Contemporary classical music ==
Maciej Zielinski's contemporary classical music is frequently performed at major contemporary classical music festivals, including: the Warsaw Autumn (Warszawska Jesień) in Poland, the Warsaw Music Encounters (Warszawskie Spotkania Muzyczne) in Poland, the Poznan Spring Festival (Poznańska Wiosna) in Poland, the Musica Polonica Nova in Wrocław, Poland, the International Festival of Sacred Music "Gaude Mater" in Częstochowa, Poland, the 14th Synthesizer-Musik-Festival in Braunschweig, Germany, Musica del Novocento in Rome, Italy, the Park Lane Festival in London, UK, the ISCM World Music Days, Romania, and the Presteigne Festival, Wales.

His music has been released on albums published by EMI Music Poland, Universal Music Poland, PWM Edition, Dux Records, ZPR Records, Polskie Nagrania Muza, Acte Préalable and the Polish Radio. The album that contains "I String Quartet" performed by DAFO String Quartet, published by PWM/Dux, received the "Fryderyk 2000" Award. September 2011 saw the release of his classical monographic album "Across the Millenniums – Music from the Turn of the Millenniums". In 2013 his album "V Symphony" received nomination for the "Fryderyk 2014" award in the category "Best album of the Year". In April 2000 the Associated Board of Royal Schools of Music selected his composition "Lutoslawski in Memoriam" for oboe and piano for their syllabus in English Schools. His compositions have been awarded at many composers’ contests, including two international competitions (2nd Prize at the Sixth Synthesizer-Musik-Festival in Braunschweig, Germany and 3rd Prize at the International Composers' Contest Jihlava'96, Czech Republic). He was nominated for "Fryderyk 2012" Award in the category "Composer of the Year" (co-nominees: Krzysztof Penderecki and Wojciech Kilar).

== Film music ==
Maciej Zielinski's film music is ranging from contemporary classical scores to soundtracks influenced by popular, electronic and jazz music. He frequently combines contemporary electronic sounds with acoustic instruments. He has written scores for numerous popular Polish productions, including "Never Ever" (Polish: "Nigdy w życiu") and "Just Love Me" (Polish: "Tylko mnie kochaj") dir. by Ryszard Zatorski, "the Photographer" (Polish: "Fotograf") dir. by Waldemar Krzystek and "Crime Detectives" (Polish: "Kryminalni") dir. by Ryszard Zatorski and Piotr Wereśniak. He also worked on several independent US productions, including "Initials S.G." dir. by Rania Attieh and Daniel Garcia, premiered at Tribeca Film Festival in 2019. Films with his soundtracks boast an audience of over 10 million in Poland, while his released soundtrack albums have achieved golden and platinum status. In 2019 he received "Best Score" award at the "New Filmmakers LA Awards" in Los Angeles for his music to "Alaska is a Drag" dir. by Shaz Bennett. In the same year he received nomination for "Crystal Pine Award" at the International Sound and Film Music Festival in Croatia for the music to "What a country!" dir. by Vinko Brešan. In 2016, 2017, and 2020 he received nominations for the Polish Film Academy Award - "Eagle" (Polish: Polskie Nagrody Filmowe: Orły) in "Best Music" category for the scores to "the Photographer" dir. by Waldemar Krzystek, "Humble Servants" and "Servants of War" dir. by Mariusz Gawryś.

== Popular music, songs and arrangements ==
As an arranger and music producer, Maciej Zieliński works with the most popular artists of the music scene in Poland, including Ania Dąbrowska - album "Wear trousers or a skirt?" (Polish: W spodniach czy w sukience?) and Kayah - album Kayah & Royal String Quartet. His song "Who Knows" performed by De Su girls band, premiered in 2001 has reached radio top charts in two consecutive years (2000, 2001). The song was also released in Hungary in 2008, sang by Hungarian singer Barbee (Hungarian title „Hógömb"), however it did not earn the popularity of the original version in Poland. His songs from the film "The Stand-ins" performed by Kayah and "Tango de amor" from the movie "Never Ever" have also enjoyed significant popularity in Poland. Maciej Zieliński has composed hundreds of TV commercials’ soundtracks, which have won him awards for the best music in TV commercials. These include Tytan’93 at Crackfilm Festival in Cracow and Kreatura’2000 award in Warsaw.

== Scholarships, roles, positions ==
Maciej Zieliński received scholarships from the Minister of Culture and Art (1995) and the British Council (1998). In 1994–1996 he served as deputy chairman of the Youth Circle of the Polish Composers' Union (Polish: Związek Kompozytorów Polskich). He was a moderator at the 20th International Course for Young Composers in Radziejowice in 2000 and served as its director in 2003. He was a member of the National Jury of the ISCM World Music Days (2002, 2004), and of the Tadeusz Baird and "Musica Sacra" Composers’ Competitions. In 2002-2007 he served as a deputy president of the Polish Section of ISCM. In 2013 he was elected deputy president of the Polish Composers’ Union for 2013-2015 period. He is a member of ZAiKS - the Polish Society of Authors and Composers. In 2011-2012 he has been giving lectures as a visiting professor at the Grażyna and Kiejstut Bacewicz Academy of Music in Łódź (postgraduate studies). During the 2011 - 2012 art seasons Maciej Zielinski was appointed Composer-In-Residence at the Polish Radio Symphony Orchestra.

== Selected works ==
- 2020 - Three Dreams and a Lullaby for cello and piano
- 2020 - Impressioni Concertante for wind quintet
- 2018 - Time Capsule for symphonic orchestra
- 2016 - Accello Tanguero for cello, accordion, string orchestra and percussion
- 2016 - That time of year for six voices
- 2015 - Sonore for orchestra
- 2014 - Violincerto for violin and chamber orchestra
- 2013 - Between Yesterday and Tomorrow for flute, viola and harp
- 2013 - Concello for cello and string orchestra
- 2012 - "V" Symphony
- 2011 - Barocode I for violin, viola and string orchestra
- 2010 - Concerto Inquieto for clarinet and orchestra
- 2006 - Shining for string orchestra
- 2004 - Trio for M.B. for clarinet, violin and cello
- 2004 - Sololis for solo piano
- 2003 - Fallen Angel for percussion and tape
- 2000 - Oratio for solo organ
- 1999 - Brass Quintet
- 1999 - Lutosławski in memoriam for oboe and piano
- 1998 - Capriccio for chamber orchestra
- 1997 - Abruzzo – Imaginary Landscape for chamber orchestra
- 1996 - Symphony No. 1
- 1996 - A. for alto saxophone and piano
- 1996 - Shining for string orchestra
- 1996 - Tractus for unaccompanied mixed choir
- 1996 - Three Phrases for clarinet, trombone, cello and piano
- 1995 - Piano Concerto No. 1
- 1995 - Clouds for tape
- 1995 - Capriccio for solo violin
- 1995 - Domine, quis habitabit for unaccompanied mixed choir
- 1994 - Alone in a Crowd... for alto saxophone and tape
- 1994 - Vox Humana for percussion and amplified cello
- 1994 - String Quartet No. 1
- 1993 - Musica per archi A.D. 1993
- 1993 - Sonata for accordion
- 1993 - Capriccio for clarinet and piano
- 1993 - Perchoir for mixed choir and percussion
- 1992 - Miniatures for chamber orchestra
- 1991 - Variations for solo clarinet
- 1991 - Concertino for clarinet and piano
- 1989 - Miniature for string quartet

== Filmography ==
- 2019 – "Servants of War" dir. by Mariusz Gawryś
- 2019 – "Initials S.G." dir. by Rania Attieh and Daniel Garcia
- 2018 – "What a Country!" dir. by Vinko Bresan
- 2018 – "Desolation" dir. by David Moscow
- 2017 – "With rhythm of the heartbeat" dir. by Piotr Wereśniak
- 2017 – "Just Friendship" dir. by Filip Zylber
- 2016 – "Alaska is a drag" dir. by Shaz Bennett
- 2016 – "The Tale of Old Miller" dir. by Pavel Grytsak
- 2016 – "Humble servants" dir. by Mariusz Gawrys
- 2015 – "Natureland" dir. by Malcolm Murray
- 2015 – "Sucked in" dir. by Piotr Weresniak
- 2015 – "Put the siren on" dir. by Leszek Korusiewicz
- 2014 – "Photographer" dir. by Waldemar Krzystek
- 2011 – "Oh, Charles 2" dir. by Piotr Weresniak
- 2010 – "Baby Project" dir. by Adam Dobrzycki
- 2008 – "It is not as you think, Honey" dir. by Slawomir Krynski
- 2008 – "Agents" dir. by Piotr Weresniak (TV Series)
- 2008 – "Darling, don't lie" dir. by Piotr Weresniak
- 2008 – "Once again" dir. by Mariusz Malec
- 2007 – "Why not!" dir. by Ryszard Zatorski
- 2007 – "Shades of happiness" dir. by Natalia Koryncka(TV Series)
- 2006 – "Stuntmen" dir. by Marcin Ziebinski
- 2006 – "Just love me" dir. by Ryszard Zatorski
- 2004 – "Crime detectives" dir. by Ryszard Zatorski (TV Series)
- 2004 – "Never ever" dir. by Ryszard Zatorski
- 2000 – "A very Christmas story" dir. by Dariusz Zawislak
- 1997 – "Germans" dir. by Zbigniew Kaminski
- 1996 – "Street games" dir. by Krzysztof Krauze

== Bibliography ==
- Ewa Cichoń, Maciej Zieliński in Encyclopedia of Music PWM, vol .12.
