= Eps3.5 kill-process.inc =

"eps3.5_kill-process.inc"
- Mr. Robot episode
- After thinking that he successfully stopped Stage 2, Elliot watches news reports showing that 71 E Corp facilities have been bombed, killing thousands of people.
- Episode no.: Season 3 Episode 6
- Directed by: Sam Esmail
- Written by: Kyle Bradstreet
- Cinematography by: Tod Campbell
- Editing by: Justin Krohn
- Original release date: November 15, 2017
- Running time: 46 minutes

Guest appearances
- Sakina Jaffrey as Antara Nayar; Omar Metwally as Ernesto Santiago; Grant Chang as Grant; Julia Crockett as Emily Moss; Rizwan Manji as Norm Gill

Episode chronology
← Previous "eps3.4_runtime-error.r00"	Next → "eps3.6 fredrick+tanya.chk"

"eps3.5_kill-process.inc" is the sixth episode of the third season of the American drama thriller television series Mr. Robot. It is the 28th overall episode of the series and was written by executive producer Kyle Bradstreet and directed by series creator Sam Esmail. It originally aired on USA Network on November 15, 2017.

The series follows Elliot Alderson, a cybersecurity engineer and hacker with social anxiety disorder, who is recruited by an insurrectionary anarchist known as "Mr. Robot" to join a group of hacktivists called "fsociety". In the episode, Elliot makes a last attempt at stopping Stage 2.

According to Nielsen Media Research, the episode was seen by an estimated 0.598 million household viewers and gained a 0.3 ratings share among adults aged 18–49. The episode received critical acclaim, with critics praising the performances, writing, tension and ending.

== Plot ==
In a flashback, a young Angela attends a party thrown for her mother Emily (Julia Crockett), in the wake of Emily's leukemia diagnosis. Edward (Christian Slater) suggests to Angela that she should spend more time with her mother. After Emily talks with Antara (Sakina Jaffrey), she tells Angela about her approaching death and explains that this won't be the end for her, saying they will meet someday in another world.

In the present, Elliot (Rami Malek) confronts Angela (Portia Doubleday) over her association with Tyrell (Martin Wallström). Angela refuses to reveal anything about the Dark Army's plan, but Elliot realizes that Tyrell is at a Red Wheelbarrow restaurant. Believing he won't be able to gain access to E Corp's back-up facility, Elliot decides to alert the fire brigade about a bomb threat at the building. However, when firefighters can't find any bombs, everyone is allowed back inside. During this, Darlene (Carly Chaikin) meets with Dominique (Grace Gummer) and Norm (Rizwan Manji) to talk about her encounter with Elliot. The agents manage to trace Elliot's location to a Red Wheelbarrow, although Dominique suspects that Darlene is hiding something from them.

Elliot is forced to enter the back-up facility by stealing a guard's badge. He tries to override the planned attack, but finds himself glitching out, as Mr. Robot is trying to get him away. After failing multiple times to get into a computer, he decides to go to the battery room, hitting himself in order to prevent Mr. Robot from taking over. Zhang (BD Wong) is informed by Santiago (Omar Metwally) that Tyrell's location has been discovered and sends specific instructions to Irving (Bobby Cannavale). Irving informs Tyrell that his meeting with his family in Ukraine will not happen, frustrating Tyrell, who feels cheated. Irving hands him instructions, and tells him to burn the paper once he is finished, apologizing for everything.

Dominique enters the Red Wheelbarrow and notes a fire coming from a back door. She breaks in and descends into Tyrell's basement, where he has burned the instructions. She finds a secret door, but there is no trace of Tyrell. As she leaves, she sees Tyrell screaming in public about an incoming attack, and getting arrested. Darlene confronts Angela at her apartment, chastising her for their intended bombing attack and threatening her with informing the FBI.

As a last resource, Elliot writes a note for Mr. Robot, telling him the paper records are not in the building and that the attack is pointless. Mr. Robot gives in and helps in getting to the room and finish the attack. A relieved Elliot leaves the facility, confused by the Dark Army's decision to target the building despite knowing that the records were not stored there. However, as he walks through the streets, he joins a disturbed crowd to see a news report. It reveals that 71 E Corp facilities across the country have been bombed, killing thousands of people.

== Production ==
=== Development ===
The episode was written by executive producer Kyle Bradstreet and directed by series creator Sam Esmail. This was Bradstreet's fifth writing credit, and Esmail's 21st directing credit.

== Reception ==
=== Viewers ===
In its original American broadcast, "eps3.5_kill-process.inc" was seen by an estimated 0.598 million household viewers with a 0.3 in the 18-49 demographics. This means that 0.3 percent of all households with televisions watched the episode. This was a 14% increase in viewership from the previous episode, which was watched by an estimated 0.521 million household viewers with a 0.2 in the 18-49 demographics.

=== Critical reviews ===
"eps3.5_kill-process.inc" received critical acclaim. The review aggregator website Rotten Tomatoes reported an 100% approval rating for the episode, based on 12 reviews. The site's consensus states: "'Eps3.5_kill-process.inc' is another adrenaline rush, draped in Mr. Robot's unique visual stylings."

Alex McLevy of The A.V. Club gave the episode an "A–" grade and wrote, "'Kill-pr0cess.par2' is the thrilling adrenaline rush of an episode that last week's unbroken-take gimmick came close to achieving. It's the flip side of the same coin: Instead of a faux single take, here Sam Esmail keeps cutting... and cutting... and cutting. Lancing back and forth between Elliot, Angela, Darlene, Dom, Tyrell, and more, the tension builds, every smash cut to another location mirroring the smash cuts in Elliot's own mind. The episode strips away the bells and whistles that have so often been the laziest possible shorthand to explain Mr. Robot's brilliance, and the result is a classically structured example of superlative television."

Alan Sepinwall of Uproxx wrote, "That we spent one-fifth of the season on Elliot, Dom, Angela, and others going all out to stop or help a plot that ultimately didn't matter should feel frustrating, but the style of both episodes, what the fake-out says about just how far ahead of the game Whiterose is, and what we learned about Elliot's relationships with Mr. Robot, with Darlene, and with Angela more than justified these hours' existence. Well done. Eager to see what's next." Kyle Fowle of Entertainment Weekly wrote, "Last week's episode may have been the season's creative high point, a daring and immersive experience that put us inside the anxiety coursing through Elliot and Angela, but this week's episode, 'Eps3.5_kill-process.inc,' doesn't let up. In fact, it uses the uncomfortably intimate nature of 'Eps3.4_runtime-error.r00' to further enhance the paranoia sitting at the heart of this season. And then it all pays off in explosive fashion."

Jeremy Egner of The New York Times wrote, "We all beat ourselves up from time to time. But Elliot took that phenomenon to a brutal new level this week on Mr. Robot, throwing himself down stairs and into walls as he worked through the stages of grappling with your alter ego." Vikram Murthi of Vulture gave the episode a perfect 5 star rating out of 5 and wrote, "Throughout 'eps3.5_kill-pr0cess.inc,' Mr. Robot creates tension around a perceived threat that could seemingly take place at any time. The potential destruction of the New York storage facility informs every action and belief. Some think they’re doing the right thing; others know they aren't."

Alec Bojalad of Den of Geek gave the episode a 4.5 star rating out of 5 and wrote, "There is real, sustained and thrilling tension here. Mr. Robot may have taken quite a long time in laying down the stakes but now “Runtime Error” and “Kill Process” are collecting on them it’s legitimately riveting television." Caralynn Lippo of TV Fanatic gave the episode a 4.75 star rating out of 5 and wrote, "Whereas 'Runtime Error' narrowed the focus for an uncomfortably tense and intimate hour following only Elliot and Angela (in turn), 'Kill Process' went in the complete opposite direction."
