= Eps3.8 stage3.torrent =

"eps3.8_stage3.torrent"
- Mr. Robot episode
- Episode no.: Season 3 Episode 9
- Directed by: Sam Esmail
- Written by: Kyle Bradstreet; Courtney Looney
- Cinematography by: Tod Campbell
- Editing by: Rosanne Tan
- Original release date: December 6, 2017
- Running time: 48 minutes

Guest appearances
- Bruce Altman as Terry Colby; Grant Chang as Grant; Michel Gill as Gideon Goddard; Joey Badass as Leon; Omar Metwally as Ernesto Santiago

Episode chronology
← Previous "eps3.7 dont-delete-me.ko"	Next → "shutdown -r"

"eps3.8_stage3.torrent" is the ninth episode of the third season of the American drama thriller television series Mr. Robot. It is the 31st overall episode of the series and was written by executive producer Kyle Bradstreet and Courtney Looney, and directed by series creator Sam Esmail. It originally aired on USA Network on December 6, 2017.

The series follows Elliot Alderson, a cybersecurity engineer and hacker with social anxiety disorder, who is recruited by an insurrectionary anarchist known as "Mr. Robot" to join a group of hacktivists called "fsociety". In the episode, Elliot decides to set up a meeting with Whiterose, while Darlene seduces Dominique in order to get information.

According to Nielsen Media Research, the episode was seen by an estimated 0.437 million household viewers and gained a 0.2 ratings share among adults aged 18–49. The episode received mixed reviews from critics, who questioned the episode's narrative and logic.

== Plot ==
In a flashback, Gideon (Michel Gill) holds a meeting with Tyrell (Martin Wallström), Price (Michael Cristofer) and Terry Colby (Bruce Altman), after they hire Allsafe to provide computer security at E Corp. During the meeting, Angela (Portia Doubleday) enters to give a folder to Gideon, catching Price's interest. On the way out, Price and Tyrell debate the merits of hiring Allsafe.

In present day, Elliot (Rami Malek) discovers that Mr. Robot (Christian Slater) was out during the night and left a message on the bathroom mirror, which reads "They own the FBI." He tells Darlene (Carly Chaikin) that he will try to get Romero's encryption keys of Five/Nine within the FBI. Despite Elliot's claim that the Dark Army controls the FBI, Darlene leaves to get information from Dominique (Grace Gummer). Elliot forces Irving (Bobby Cannavale) to set up a meeting with Whiterose (BD Wong), but is then confronted by Leon (Joey Badass) at his apartment, who wants Elliot to come with him.

It is revealed that during the previous night, Mr. Robot met with Tyrell at his apartment, after the latter was cleared of all charges. As Tyrell prepares to brutally beat Mr. Robot, they are interrupted by Price. Price has chosen to appoint Tyrell as the CTO, but only as a figurehead. After he leaves, Tyrell and Mr. Robot decide to work together to take down the Dark Army, as they know it has a mole in the FBI. Darlene meets with Dominique, attempting to seduce her in order to get her badge. When she resists, Darlene convinces her in taking her to her apartment. Though Dominique initially resists her advances, she eventually gives in and they have sex. While Dominique sleeps, Darlene tries to get the badge, only to be caught by Dominique.

In FBI custody, Darlene says she knows a way to undo the hack and tells Dominique that the Dark Army has infiltrated the FBI. This spooks the mole, Santiago (Omar Metwally), who calls Irving to inform him of Darlene's plan. Leon leads Elliot to meet with Grant (Grant Chang), where he discusses his plan for a Stage 3 and has his laptop scanned by the Dark Army. Grant then meets with Whiterose, who is angry that moving the plant to the Congo will now take an additional month. He then talks about Elliot's Stage 3, which Whiterose is confused with. Elliot is revealed to have lied; he gained access to the Dark Army's network when they scanned his laptop. Realizing their situation, Whiterose gives Chang permission to kill Elliot.

== Production ==
=== Development ===
The episode was written by Kyle Bradstreet and Courtney Looney, and directed by series creator Sam Esmail. This was Bradstreet's sixth writing credit, Looney's second writing credit, and Esmail's 24th directing credit.

== Reception ==
=== Viewers ===
In its original American broadcast, "eps3.8_stage3.torrent" was seen by an estimated 0.437 million household viewers with a 0.2 in the 18-49 demographics. This means that 0.2 percent of all households with televisions watched the episode. This was a slight decrease in viewership from the previous episode, which was watched by an estimated 0.444 million household viewers with a 0.2 in the 18-49 demographics.

=== Critical reviews ===
"eps3.8_stage3.torrent" received mixed reviews from critics. The review aggregator website Rotten Tomatoes reported a 69% approval rating for the episode, based on 13 reviews. The site's consensus states: "The penultimate episode of season three takes narrative risks and fractures character focuses, to laudable but mixed results."

Alex McLevy of The A.V. Club gave the episode a "B" grade and wrote, "We're all hypocrites, Mr. Robot argues, but that's beside the point: The idea isn't necessarily to change the world. It's to somehow understand it. Consider it a strangely optimistic form of the observer effect — that just by watching something, we'll alter it."

Alan Sepinwall of Uproxx wrote, "It would be nice to have a clear sense of where things are going, but I'm not holding my breath three years in. Season three suggests Mr. Robot has a much better grasp of its strengths and weaknesses, but some weaknesses are just baked in, especially on a show that likes to surprise the audience a time or twelve." Kyle Fowle of Entertainment Weekly wrote, "So much of this season has been about exploring the fallout of the 5/9 hack and then Stage 2, and at the heart of that exploration is the emotional, human toll it's taken on many of these characters. Mr. Robot isn't telling you who to feel bad for, but rather poking at the various motivations of each character."

Jeremy Egner of The New York Times wrote, "While the actions and decisions that led to these encounters made sense from a character standpoint, only a few of them were very satisfying. The result was an uneven, somewhat draggy episode that nevertheless set up plenty of jeopardy for next week's Season 3 finale." Vikram Murthi of Vulture gave the episode a 3 star rating out of 5 and wrote, "That's all well and good, and it might set the stage for a good finale, but this episode has trouble bringing all of its various threads together in a compelling way. Along with explaining all the necessary plot elements, it also folds in Angela's extended breakdown, Tyrell's diminished future, and Mr. Robot's discovery of the real enemies. In short, it's a lot of material, and writers Kyle Bradstreet and Courtney Looney deserve credit for keeping it all coherent, but just because the episode successfully delivers information doesn't mean the method of delivery is sound."

Alec Bojalad of Den of Geek gave the episode a 4 star rating out of 5 and wrote, "'Stage 3' works well emotionally and thematically but one of its biggest missteps is logical. How is Elliot so easily able to Trojan Horse onto the Dark Army's networks with a USB drive when accessing the FBI's servers is nearly impossible? It's easy to take a logical leap of faith like this, especially when we're all far technologically dumber than Elliot. But it ends up not being fair to the characters involved as Elliot is able to enact his part of the plan easily and flawlessly while Darlene spectacularly fucks up with the FBI. And it's not clear that it's really her fault other than the show needing Elliot to succeed and her to fail." Caralynn Lippo of TV Fanatic gave the episode a 3.5 star rating out of 5 and wrote, "Largely predictable and a bit of a drag, I wasn't too fond of 'Stage 3.' I suppose I spoke slightly too soon when I called [the previous episode] my least favorite of the season."
