= Desolation (2016 film) =

- Directed by: David Moscow
- Written by: Matthew McCarty; Craig Walendziak
- Produced by: Gregory Thomas; David Harris; Luke Edwards; Todd Remis
- Starring: Dominik García-Lorido; Brock Kelly; Raymond J. Barry
- Cinematography: Darin Moran
- Edited by: Joel Plotch
- Music by: Maciej Zieliński
- Distributed by: Gravitas Ventures
- Release dates: October 2016 (American Film Festival, Poland); January 26, 2018 (New York City and Los Angeles)
- Running time: 90 minutes
- Country: United States
- Language: English

Desolation is a 2016 American thriller film directed by David Moscow, written by Matthew McCarty and Craig Walendziak, and starring Dominik García-Lorido, Brock Kelly and Raymond J. Barry.

== Cast ==
- Dominik García-Lorido as Katie
- Brock Kelly as Jay
- Raymond J. Barry as Father Bill
- Ninja N. Devoe as Debbie

== Release ==
The film was released theatrically in New York City and Los Angeles on January 26, 2018.

== Reception ==
The film has a 44% rating on Rotten Tomatoes based on nine reviews.

Joe Leydon of Variety gave the film a negative review and wrote, "A potentially intriguing premise gets a maladroit execution in a thriller that's more befuddling than exciting."

Kimber Myers of the Los Angeles Times also gave the film a negative review and wrote, "It wants to be a commentary on the depravity of Hollywood and what people find entertaining, but instead it mostly just mirrors the media’s habit of using sexual trauma as a plot device and surviving such horrors as a character trait."

Norman Gidney of Film Threat awarded the film two stars and wrote, "If Desolation had just assumed that its audience needed less explanation while doling out the mystery, this could have been a savvy update. Instead, the film just comes off as contrived."

Dax Ebaben of Bloody Disgusting awarded the film two and a half skulls out of five and wrote, "In all, Desolation is not a bad film, it’s simply middle-of-the-road. Respectably, the film has something to say and makes no bones about it."
