= Shutdown -r (Mr. Robot) =

"shutdown -r"
- Mr. Robot episode
- Episode no.: Season 3 Episode 10
- Directed by: Sam Esmail
- Written by: Sam Esmail
- Cinematography by: Tod Campbell
- Editing by: John Petaja; Justin Krohn
- Original release date: December 13, 2017
- Running time: 57 minutes

Guest appearances
- Omar Metwally as Ernesto Santiago; Grant Chang as Grant; Joey Badass as Leon

Episode chronology
← Previous "eps3.8 stage3.torrent"	Next → "401 Unauthorized"

"shutdown -r" is the tenth episode and season finale of the third season of the American drama thriller television series Mr. Robot. It is the 32nd overall episode of the series and was written and directed by series creator Sam Esmail. It originally aired on USA Network on December 13, 2017.

The series follows Elliot Alderson, a cybersecurity engineer and hacker with social anxiety disorder, who is recruited by an insurrectionary anarchist known as "Mr. Robot" to join a group of hacktivists called "fsociety". In the episode, Elliot and Darlene are taken by the Dark Army, while Angela meets with Price.

According to Nielsen Media Research, the episode was seen by an estimated 0.454 million household viewers and gained a 0.2 ratings share among adults aged 18–49. The episode received critical acclaim, with critics praising the performances, writing, directing, editing and score.

== Plot ==
Dark Army agents led by Grant (Grant Chang) raid Elliot's apartment, finding it empty. Elliot (Rami Malek) is revealed to have hidden in Shayla's apartment next door, and goes to meet Darlene (Carly Chaikin) at the arcade. Finding out about her arrest, Elliot laments that he caused everything to happen. He then talks with Mr. Robot, finally admitting that he missed him after the latter said he wouldn't have bombed the 71 facilities. Mr. Robot reveals that Santiago (Omar Metwally) is a Dark Army mole in the FBI. They check his apartment, only to be captured by Irving (Bobby Cannavale).

Fearing his cover is blown, Santiago takes Darlene out of the FBI office, but when confronted by Dominique (Grace Gummer), he is forced to knock her unconscious and kidnap her as well. He takes them to a barn where Elliot is also held captive by Irving, Leon (Joey Badass), and other Dark Army operatives. Irving takes Dominique and Santiago to a field, where he threatens her with an axe while Santiago suggests using her as an informant. As she refuses, Irving surprises her by killing Santiago with the axe. As he continues hacking his corpse with the axe, he forces Dominique to become their informant, revealing that he knows her family members' locations and will kill them if she refuses. Grant arrives, and Irving informs him he will officially leave on a sabbatical, annoying him.

As Grant prepares to kill Elliot and Darlene, Elliot threatens that he will leak the Dark Army's information if they are killed. Grant communicates with Whiterose (BD Wong), who is watching the events, and declares he is of no use anymore. Leon kills the Dark Army agents. Grant then shoots himself. Leon has Elliot move Whiterose's plant to the Congo sooner. During this, Angela (Portia Doubleday) meets with Price (Michael Cristofer) at his mansion. He reveals his past, in which he dated Angela's mother and conceived a child, Angela herself. Due to his nature, Angela's mother refused to get him involved in Angela's life, so she hid this from her. He convinces her to accept that Whiterose's actions were destructive, telling her she needs to live with the results of her own actions.

Dominique leaves the barn, refusing to accept Darlene's apology but forced to give the FBI access to Elliot. As Elliot decrypts the file, he learns that Romero wasn't responsible for the encryption keys. Later, Elliot converses with Mr. Robot, having deduced he was actually the one responsible. Having accepted his part of what they need, they vow in taking down all elites. He then sends the file to E Corp, effectively undoing the Five/Nine attack.

In a post-credits scene, Darlene and a woman go to Elliot's apartment. As they talk about the economy, a car pulls up in front of the apartment. The woman leaves, and four people walk towards Darlene, one of them asking her for help. When she asks who he is, the man is revealed to be Fernando Vera (Elliot Villar).

== Production ==
=== Development ===
The episode was written and directed by series creator Sam Esmail. This was Esmail's 17th writing credit, and 25th directing credit.

== Reception ==
=== Viewers ===
In its original American broadcast, "shutdown -r" was seen by an estimated 0.454 million household viewers with a 0.2 in the 18-49 demographics. This means that 0.2 percent of all households with televisions watched the episode. This was a slight increase in viewership from the previous episode, which was watched by an estimated 0.437 million household viewers with a 0.2 in the 18-49 demographics.

=== Critical reviews ===
"shutdown -r" received critical acclaim. The review aggregator website Rotten Tomatoes reported a 92% approval rating for the episode, based on 12 reviews. The site's consensus states: "The season finale of Mr. Robot is loaded with reveals, revelations and, in some sense, a return to the status quo."

Matt Fowler of IGN gave the episode an "amazing" 9 out of 10 and wrote in his verdict, "Mr. Robot's Season 3 finale probably could have sufficed as a series-ender if the show wasn't granted another season, but oh-so-much would have still been left on the table. "shutdown -r" certainly followed many of the rules of an endgame given all the "back to the start" twists it brought into play - secret family members, false memories, etc. - but it also worked as the jumping off point for a fourth season adventure that could/should embrace the sci-fi the show's been teasing. As Irving said, holding Gore Vidal's "Death Likes It Hot," you gotta have a "wow!" ending."

Alex McLevy of The A.V. Club gave the episode an "A–" grade and wrote, "The show seemed like a tonic to our need to act. But now, at the close of its third season, it has revealed a secret: Action isn't always what's needed. Sometimes, acceptance of what has come before is more revolutionary than all the hacks in the world."

Alan Sepinwall of Uproxx wrote, "The season as a whole added up to less than it seemed at times, particularly in how it kept Elliot and Mr. Robot apart for so long, but I was deeply engaged by a lot of it, thanks to the more confident and open storytelling, and thanks to that guy in the hoodie." Kyle Fowle of Entertainment Weekly wrote, "It makes sense to frame that photo at the beginning of 'Eps3.9_shutdown-r' because, more than any previous episode, the season finale explores the various pitfalls and triumphs that comes with being part of a family unit, whether you define that as being linked by blood or not."

Jeremy Egner of The New York Times wrote, "The frenetic Season 3 finale of Mr. Robot was thick with reveals, reversals and reconciliations, and left no tone unturned as it cycled through suspense and tragedy, high melodrama and horror spectacle." Vikram Murthi of Vulture gave the episode a 4 star rating out of 5 and wrote, "Despite some bumps along the way, Mr. Robot's third season marks a creative resurgence for the series following a muddled, middling sophomore outing that sacrificed quite a lot of its goodwill. Creator Sam Esmail clearly took the show's criticism to heart and sought to craft a season that simplified a lot of the action while also expanding its emotional center, tying its disparate characters together through their shared despair over what they've done and what's coming down the pipeline."

Alec Bojalad of Den of Geek gave the episode a 3.5 star rating out of 5 and wrote, "'Shutdown,' for all it's [sic] flaws pulls off a pretty incredible trick. It fulfills the promise of episode 1's title. It undoes everything. Season 3 is burdened with the unenviable task of 'undoing' everything that came before it. It's a dramatic sin of the highest order. We move forward. Stories move forward. Shows move forward. Forward. Forward. Forward. Progress. Progress. Progress." Caralynn Lippo of TV Fanatic gave the episode a 4.5 star rating out of 5 and wrote, "'Shutdown' was such an exciting, satisfying, and well-executed finale that I hardly know how I'll wait the many months until Mr. Robot's return for its recently-ordered Season 4."

== Trivia ==
- The title of this episode, shutdown -r, refers to the linux command shutdown, with a "reboot" flag attached, symbolically tying it to the plot of the episode.
