= Whoami and Hello, Elliot =

"whoami" and "Hello, Elliot"
- Mr. Robot episodes
- Episode nos.: Season 4 Episodes 12, 13
- Directed by: Sam Esmail
- Written by: Sam Esmail
- Original air date: December 22, 2019
- Running time: 44 minutes ("whoami"); 51 minutes ("Hello, Elliot")

Guest appearances
- Evan Whitten as Young Elliot; Vaishnavi Sharma as Magda Alderson; Gloria Reuben as Krista Gordon

Episode chronology
← Previous "eXit"	Next → —

"whoami" and "Hello, Elliot" are two episodes of the American television series Mr. Robot that serve as the series finale. They are the twelfth and thirteenth episodes respectively of the show's fourth and final season. The two episodes, originally aired back-to-back on USA Network on December 22, 2019 and initially titled simply as "Series Finale", were both written and directed by series creator Sam Esmail.

Its ending, which had been planned from the script's inception, shows Elliot navigating a utopian version of his world with an alternate Elliot. Reviewers praised the show's shift in focus from hacking to emotions and praised the delivery of the show's final twist.

== Plot ==
=== "whoami" ===
Elliot wakes up in an abandoned lot following the explosion at the Washington Township plant, which is no longer there. He discovers the town is a thriving suburbia, where his mother and father, both alive, live. He finds out that his parents never abused him as a child, and that Darlene does not exist. He returns to the city, where he encounters Angela's parents, Emily and Phillip (the latter still being in Angela's life), from whom he learns that he is marrying Angela the following day. On answering a call that alternate Elliot makes to Angela's mom, original Elliot experiences an earthquake. He goes to the alternate Elliot's apartment and hacks his computer, discovering a hidden drive filled with sketches of himself, Darlene, and the rest of fsociety.

The alternate Elliot returns home to find the original Elliot at his computer (as depicted at the end of the previous episode). Initially alarmed, the alternate Elliot explains that the sketches are of a persona he created, one that would lead an exciting life as a vigilante hacker —the very life the original Elliot lives. They touch, causing another earthquake, which severely injures the alternate Elliot. Alternate Elliot gets a call from Angela, which original Elliot answers. On hearing her voice for the first time since her death, original Elliot decides that he can have the life he always wanted, and kills the alternate Elliot.

=== "Hello, Elliot" ===
Elliot hides the alternate Elliot's body in a storage container, intent on taking his place and marrying Angela. A police officer, Dominique, attempts to arrest Elliot after she sees the body. Elliot escapes to Coney Island, where he discovers that there is no wedding. Mr. Robot explains to Elliot that the world they are in is not the parallel world Whiterose spoke of, but rather an illusion created by Elliot to keep "the real Elliot" trapped, which he himself had briefly slipped into during morphine withdrawal. (Note: As depicted in "eps1.3 da3m0ns.mp4".)

Bewildered, Elliot wakes up in Krista's office. Krista — who is a manifestation of Elliot's mind at the moment — explains that the Elliot seen since the beginning of the series is not the real Elliot, but a persona called "the Mastermind" that the real Elliot (who has dissociative identity disorder) created to deal with his anger at the world. However, this persona decided to take over and trap the real Elliot in a utopian world, also eliminating Darlene from the fantasy as she is the real Elliot's strongest connection to reality. Krista explains that the Mastermind must give control back to the real Elliot, but he refuses as the world collapses. The Mastermind wakes up in the hospital, where Darlene tells him that Whiterose is dead, her machine is destroyed, and that she knew that the Mastermind had taken over from the beginning. Accepting his identity, the Mastermind returns to Elliot's mind with the rest of his personas. The real Elliot wakes up in the hospital and is greeted by Darlene, who says "Hello, Elliot."

== Production ==
Sam Esmail had originally envisioned Mr. Robot as a feature film and had its ending already in mind as he wrote the script. Based on the script's length, he decided to expand the film into a television show, but the series' ending remained that which he originally envisioned. The show's writers forwent the initially planned fifth season after storyboarding the episodes between the third season and the double-episode ending Esmail had planned. They found that they only needed another 11 episodes—a single season—to complete the story.

== Reception ==
=== Critical response ===
Critics praised what they described as the show's risky and successful choice to reveal Elliot's emotions and relationships at the show's core, as opposed to the austere focus on cybersecurity heists for which the show was best known. It was fitting, said The A.V. Club, for a show based on evasive identities to close in contemplation of whether it's possible to know oneself. The finale became reassurance that when trying to live meaningfully in a hostile world, it's okay to be different from one's self-image by trying to be the best version of oneself.

Critics thought that the finale handled the last plot twist well without alienating viewers, given how the show had led viewers to sympathize with the on-screen Elliot as the personality who deserved autonomy over his body. The twist did not feel like "lazy psychodrama", according to The A.V. Club, because Esmail pre-planned the narrative to be fair to its ending. Engadget described it as "an unexpected but riveting twist that felt earned."

Vox was touched by Darlene's role in the ending and the unexpected reminder of the human capacity to feel and love, in which Elliot's capacity to convince himself of lies borders on farce and is stoppable only by Darlene's love, which elicits Elliot's best self. Reviewers underscored how the show had become less about hacking and rebellion than about Elliot's life and relationships (i.e., caring for each other). Hacks played no part in the final episode.

The show ends without its defining negative space cinematography, with direction that matches the earnestness of the show's emotion. Paste described the show's use of M83's "Outro" in its closing sequence as "transcendent".

=== Ratings ===
The two-part series finale aired on USA Network on December 22, 2019. The first episode at 9:00 pm ET received 464,000 viewers, while the second episode at 10:00 pm ET dropped to 318,000 viewers. The prior episode was also the most-viewed episode of the season, with the season averaging 376,000 live viewers.
