= Eps3.7 dont-delete-me.ko =

"eps3.7_dont-delete-me.ko"
- Mr. Robot episode
- As Elliot is about to commit suicide, he is interrupted by Trenton's younger brother Mohammed.
- Episode no.: Season 3 Episode 8
- Directed by: Sam Esmail
- Written by: Sam Esmail
- Cinematography by: Tod Campbell
- Editing by: Justin Krohn
- Original release date: November 29, 2017
- Running time: 47 minutes

Guest appearances
- Dileep Rao as Sandesh Markesh; Richard Masur as Ice Cream Man; Elisha Henig as Mohammed; Josh Mostel as Bo

Episode chronology
← Previous "eps3.6 fredrick+tanya.chk"	Next → "eps3.8 stage3.torrent"

"eps3.7_dont-delete-me.ko" is the eighth episode of the third season of the American drama thriller television series Mr. Robot. It is the 30th overall episode of the series and was written and directed by series creator Sam Esmail. It originally aired on USA Network on November 29, 2017.

The series follows Elliot Alderson, a cybersecurity engineer and hacker with social anxiety disorder, who is recruited by an insurrectionary anarchist known as "Mr. Robot" to join a group of hacktivists called "fsociety". In the episode, a defeated Elliot decides to make peace with everyone following the events of the bombings.

According to Nielsen Media Research, the episode was seen by an estimated 0.444 million household viewers and gained a 0.2 ratings share among adults aged 18–49. The episode received extremely positive reviews from critics, with Rami Malek's performance receiving critical acclaim.

== Plot ==
In 1995, a sick Edward (Christian Slater) takes Elliot to the movie theater to watch Shallow Grave. However, Elliot is mad at Edward for not wanting to admit that he is dying. Edward apologizes and questions if Elliot can ever forgive him, to which Elliot declines. As they prepare to leave, Edward collapses on the hall. As people check on Edward, Elliot takes his jacket and goes inside to watch a movie.

In present day, Elliot (Rami Malek) finds out about the deaths of Mobley and Trenton, and destroys their files from his computer. He is then visited by Darlene (Carly Chaikin), who is worried that he has not left his apartment since the attacks three weeks prior. As she asks him to help Angela (Portia Doubleday), Elliot breaks down by saying he cannot keep Mr. Robot at bay through any means. Dejected, Elliot gives his dog to his landlord, burns his father's jacket, and buys morphine pills from a local drug dealer. He visits Mobley's family to pay his respects, but his brother, Sandesh (Dileep Rao) does not want to get involved. He also visits Trenton's family, who are preparing to move out of their house, saying she was a good person.

Elliot goes to Coney Island to commit suicide with the morphine pills. However, he is approached by Mohammed (Elisha Henig), Trenton's younger brother, who followed him when he left the house. Elliot takes him back to the house, but his parents won't return for a couple of hours. To kill time and at Mohammed's insistence, Elliot takes him to the movie theater, realizing that it is Back to the Future Day. Elliot decides to take Mohammed to watch Back to the Future Part II, as he had wanted to watch the film on that date. However, Mohammed disappears during the screening and Elliot realizes he left for a mosque. Elliot gets to the mosque with the help of an ice-cream truck.

At the mosque, Elliot confronts Mohammed over his disappearance. During the resulting argument, Elliot says he wishes he was dead. Mohammed opens up about his family and Elliot's relationship with Trenton, also explaining the difficulty of living in the USA. He takes Mohammed back home, promising to see him once again. He returns to Sandesh's house, intimidating him into giving Mobley a funeral, or else he will expose Sandesh's criminal activities. He then visits Angela to check how she's doing. He reminds her of the "wishing game" they used to play as kids, in which they could say their wishes and be happy even if they never came true. Having found a reason to live, Elliot returns to his apartment, where a white van drops the garbage bags into which he threw the jacket. He takes it, claims the dog back, and re-installs his computer. He opens his e-mail, finding a message that Trenton left before her death. It states that there is a way to undo the hack through keystroke logging, but the files needed for this are in the custody of the FBI.

== Production ==
=== Development ===
The episode was written and directed by series creator Sam Esmail. This was Esmail's 16th writing credit, and 23rd directing credit.

== Reception ==
=== Viewers ===
In its original American broadcast, "eps3.7_dont-delete-me.ko" was seen by an estimated 0.444 million household viewers with a 0.2 in the 18-49 demographics. This means that 0.2 percent of all households with televisions watched the episode. This was a 19% decrease in viewership from the previous episode, which was watched by an estimated 0.545 million household viewers with a 0.2 in the 18-49 demographics.

=== Critical reviews ===
"eps3.7_dont-delete-me.ko" received extremely positive reviews from critics. The review aggregator website Rotten Tomatoes reported an 100% approval rating for the episode, based on 12 reviews. The site's consensus states: "'Eps3.7_dont-delete-me.ko' provides a switch-up and slowdown after a run of chest-pounding installments."

Alex McLevy of The A.V. Club gave the episode a "B" grade and wrote, "Elliot was going to kill himself, but the world wasn't ready to let him go. This seems to be the way of many aborted attempts at suicide — something simply delays the act until the point where the person is forced to contend with the fact that life will go on, and maybe that's okay. There's no big cathartic moment, no 'a-ha!' revelation or instant that it all makes sense. If anything, it's the opposite: The world continues to be a confusing and terrible place, but just by virtue of getting through the night, life returns to being livable, if only a little."

Alan Sepinwall of Uproxx wrote, "There are a lot of ways an episode that's essentially about Elliot being roused from a suicidal stupor thanks to his interaction with a cute kid could have gone terribly awry and felt mawkish and/or silly. But the spell that 'Don't Delete Me' cast really worked. Well done." Kyle Fowle of Entertainment Weekly wrote, "Slowly, Angela starts to come back, until she chimes in with the line that they always used with each other at the end of the game: 'No matter what, we'll be okay.' Every other episode this season has suggested otherwise. But you need to find hope wherever you can."

Jeremy Egner of The New York Times wrote, "It was the most dramatic of several signs that despite its dark imaginings and increasingly frightened and militarized setting, Mr. Robot still believes in the people’s ability to turn things around." Vikram Murthi of Vulture gave the episode a 4 star rating out of 5 and wrote, "'eps3.7_dont-delete-me.ko' follows Elliot's suicide attempt and his slow return from the brink. Written and directed by Sam Esmail, it's an unusually sentimental episode of Mr. Robot, one that passionately argues life is worth living even when you’re going through personal hell. Given the series's appropriately fatalist attitude for the past few episodes, this marks a noticeable shift in tone. Mr. Robot has ostensibly earned that shift, and the end result is satisfying, but it's not without its fair share of bumps in the road."

Alec Bojalad of Den of Geek gave the episode a 4.5 star rating out of 5 and wrote, "'Don't Delete Me' really does a solid job of not feeling obligatory. From the opening moments of Elliot blowing up at Darlene it's clear that what we’re seeing is a necessary reset and regrouping... along with some emotional recalibration for our characters. Elements like the Back to the Future day and the ice cream truck man help disguise the thinness of the premise, making 'Don't Delete Me' an altogether enjoyable hour." Caralynn Lippo of TV Fanatic gave the episode a 4 star rating out of 5 and wrote, "Overall, this was about as predictable as an hour of this show can possibly get. But in the end, it was well-executed and avoided too much sentimentality, so I can't legitimately fault it."
