= Eps3.6 fredrick+tanya.chk =

"eps3.6_fredrick+tanya.chk"
- Mr. Robot episode
- Mobley and Trenton in their apartment, having been taken hostage by Leon
- Episode no.: Season 3 Episode 7
- Directed by: Sam Esmail
- Written by: Adam Penn
- Cinematography by: Tod Campbell
- Editing by: John Petaja
- Original release date: November 22, 2017
- Running time: 47 minutes

Guest appearances
- Omar Metwally as Ernesto Santiago; Azhar Khan as Sunil "Mobley" Markesh; Sunita Mani as Shama "Trenton" Biswas; Rizwan Manji as Norm Gill; Joey Badass as Leon; Grant Chang as Grant; Karl Kenzler as Tyrell's Lawyer; Ben Livingston as Chad Davidovitz; Gloria Reuben as Dr. Krista Gordon

Episode chronology
← Previous "eps3.5 kill-process.inc"	Next → "eps3.7 dont-delete-me.ko"

"eps3.6_fredrick+tanya.chk" is the seventh episode of the third season of the American drama thriller television series Mr. Robot. It is the 29th overall episode of the series and was written by Adam Penn and directed by series creator Sam Esmail. It originally aired on USA Network on November 22, 2017.

The series follows Elliot Alderson, a cybersecurity engineer and hacker with social anxiety disorder, who is recruited by an insurrectionary anarchist known as "Mr. Robot" to join a group of hacktivists called "fsociety". In the episode, the Dark Army prepares for their next move, while Tyrell is questioned over his actions.

According to Nielsen Media Research, the episode was seen by an estimated 0.545 million household viewers and gained a 0.2 ratings share among adults aged 18–49. The episode received extremely positive reviews from critics, who praised the writing, directing and tension.

== Plot ==
In Arizona, Leon (Joey Badass) has taken Mobley (Azhar Khan) and Trenton (Sunita Mani) hostage in their apartment, after killing their roommate. He then takes them to the desert to bury the body. While Leon digs the grave, Trenton breaks free and escapes in Leon's car, but she crashes it into a rock.

At a therapy session with Krista (Gloria Reuben), Elliot (Rami Malek) is unable to express himself. As Mr. Robot (Christian Slater), he expresses frustration with Elliot's lack of cooperation. He also reveals that he was behind Five/Nine and that he tried to only bomb one facility, also expressing disdain that Tyrell (Martin Wallström) is credited as the mastermind. As an fsociety video promises something else within 24 hours, Tyrell's lawyer (Karl Kenzler) meets with Dominique (Grace Gummer) and Santiago (Omar Metwally). The lawyer claims Tyrell was kidnapped and forced to work on the attack, and suggests an immunity deal for Tyrell in exchange for revealing more information on the Dark Army. Santiago considers the idea, to Dominique's anger.

Tyrell identifies two fsociety members as the perpetrators of the incoming attack, and demands to see his family. Santiago visits him and turns off the security camera. He reveals Joanna's death and their son's adoption, and intimidates him to not reveal Santiago's involvement, devastating Tyrell.

Krista considers what to do with Mr. Robot's statement, debating whether or not to report it to the authorities. As the bombings' death toll reaches 4,000, Darlene (Carly Chaikin) is angry that Angela (Portia Doubleday) is not affected by the events, and that she claims everyone is going to be okay. She is further disturbed when Angela continually replays the explosions on TV and says that the dead will come back.

Price (Michael Cristofer) angrily confronts Zhang (BD Wong) over the attacks, who plans to move the Washington Township plant to the Congo after the annexation. Zhang claims that the attack will actually benefit E Coin, something that Price mocks. Zhang then reveals that he ruined Price as punishment for his disobedience and for not controlling Angela and the lawsuit, and now intends to select his replacement. Mr. Robot visits Irving (Bobby Cannavale), who knocks him unconscious and takes him to outside an elite party. Irving tells him that his revolution was only allowed to happen because the higher-ups wanted it.

After making Trenton and Mobley bury the body, Leon takes them back to their apartment, where Dark Army agents await. One of these include Zhang's assistant, Grant (Grant Chang), while Leon leaves the house. Grant reveals a code for an attack on air traffic control and refuses to let them be part of the Dark Army, saying the best sacrifice is suicide. It is revealed that Tyrell identified both Trenton and Mobley as the people responsible for the attack and the threatening fsociety video, and that a co-worker reported them to the authorities. The FBI raids the house, finding that Trenton and Mobley shot themselves in the head. The Dark Army has also planted false evidence linking fsociety with Iran. Santiago is satisfied with the results, having "prevented another attack." A stunned Dominique adds Whiterose to the whiteboard, saying that Whiterose will get away with it.

== Production ==
=== Development ===
The episode was written by Adam Penn and directed by series creator Sam Esmail. This was Penn's third writing credit, and Esmail's 22nd directing credit.

== Reception ==
=== Viewers ===
In its original American broadcast, "eps3.6_fredrick+tanya.chk" was seen by an estimated 0.545 million household viewers with a 0.2 in the 18-49 demographics. This means that 0.2 percent of all households with televisions watched the episode. This was a 9% decrease in viewership from the previous episode, which was watched by an estimated 0.598 million household viewers with a 0.3 in the 18-49 demographics.

=== Critical reviews ===
"eps3.6_fredrick+tanya.chk" received extremely positive reviews from critics. The review aggregator website Rotten Tomatoes reported an 82% approval rating for the episode, based on 12 reviews. The site's consensus states: "A grim hour effectively sets up the back end for season three of Mr. Robot."

Alex McLevy of The A.V. Club gave the episode a "B" grade and wrote, "Whiterose is pledging faith to a different religious cult than capitalism, one where the ticking seconds on a clock are the body and blood of her savior. Time is both the vessel and the goal for everything unfolding. Until Elliot understand the nature of the plot that has so perverted their actions, they’ll be raging against the wrong foe. It's time to hear the good word from Angela about resetting the clock, forever and ever. Amen."

Alan Sepinwall of Uproxx wrote, "After two of the series' most intense episodes ever aired back to back, the season downshifts again for 'Fredrick & Tanya,' a piece-mover episode with a heavy undercurrent of Evil Triumphant, as all the characters come to grip with the totality of Whiterose's victory, even if none of them can quite understand it." Kyle Fowle of Entertainment Weekly wrote, "Mr. Robot, and especially 'Eps3.6_fredrick&tanya.chk,' is playing on that terrifying shift in perspective. This is an episode that, much like last week's, interrogates not only our understanding of what is happening with the Dark Army and Elliot’s revolution, but also the characters' understanding of their role within it all."

Jeremy Egner of The New York Times wrote, "The lesson, as usual on this show, is that control is an illusion, a mirage that lasts precisely as long as the world's true masters allow it to." Vikram Murthi of Vulture gave the episode a 4 star rating out of 5 and wrote, "'eps3.6_frederick&tanya.chk' stews in the depressive atmosphere created by the Dark Army. It captures brief glimpses of shock and despair, people lashing out or receding inward after experiencing a trauma. When it does tie up loose ends, in the form of two beloved returning characters, it’s given the proper emotional weight. Mr. Robot emphasizes that these are unique, distressing times, and there's no guarantee that the good guys will ever win again."

Alec Bojalad of Den of Geek gave the episode a 4.5 star rating out of 5 and wrote, "'Frederick & Tanya' closes out the mini 'Dark Army Triumphant' trilogy that was opened by 'Runtime Error' and then continued in 'Kill Process.' The three episodes represent the bleakest hours of Mr. Robot yet. They're also the show's single best sustained run since it began." Caralynn Lippo of TV Fanatic gave the episode a 4.25 star rating out of 5 and wrote, "From the deaths of two formerly-major characters to the ancillary killings of thousands in the Evil Corp terrorists attacks, 'Fredrick + Tanya' is, at the end of the day, an unrelentingly dark hour of the series."
