= 408 Request Timeout (Mr. Robot) =

- Mr. Robot episode
- Episode no.: Season 4 Episode 8
- Directed by: Sam Esmail
- Written by: Robbie Pickering
- Cinematography by: Tod Campbell
- Editing by: Rosanne Tan
- Original release date: November 24, 2019
- Running time: 44 minutes

Guest appearances
- Evan Whitten as Young Elliot; Young M.A as Peanuts; Liz Larsen as Trudy; Alex Morf as Deegan McGuire; Gloria Reuben as Dr. Krista Gordon

Episode chronology
← Previous "407 Proxy Authentication Required"	Next → "409 Conflict"

"408 Request Timeout" is the eighth episode of the fourth season of the American drama thriller television series Mr. Robot. It is the 40th overall episode of the series and was written by Robbie Pickering and directed by series creator Sam Esmail. It originally aired on USA Network on November 24, 2019.

The series follows Elliot Alderson, a cybersecurity engineer and hacker with social anxiety disorder, who is recruited by an insurrectionary anarchist known as "Mr. Robot" to join a group of hacktivists called "fsociety". As the series progresses, Elliot finds himself at odds with his real persona and with Mr. Robot's plans. In the episode, Elliot revisits his past, while Janice forces Darlene in giving up Elliot's location.

According to Nielsen Media Research, the episode was seen by an estimated 0.376 million household viewers and gained a 0.1 ratings share among adults aged 18–49. The episode received extremely positive reviews from critics, with critics praising the performances, character development and directing.

== Plot ==
In 1995, young Elliot (Evan Whitten) and Angela play hide-and-seek at the Queens Museum. While hiding in a warehouse, Elliot talks with an unseen figure. He then leaves the warehouse, and Angela finds him.

In the present, Krista (Gloria Reuben) takes a shaken Elliot (Rami Malek) out of her apartment, leaving Vera's body to be found by his henchmen. They escape in a taxi cab, leaving for a police station. However, Elliot can't bring himself to enter and parts ways with Krista. Noticing a younger version of himself, Elliot follows him to the Queens Museum. They get to the warehouse, where he finds his father's key to Elliot's childhood bedroom, now remembering he had hidden it in one of the walls as his way of fighting back.

Janice (Ashlie Atkinson) ties Darlene (Carly Chaikin) and Dominique (Grace Gummer) to chairs, demanding to know Elliot's location. Darlene refuses to tell her, so Janice stabs Dominique in the lung. When Darlene still does not comply, Janice threatens to kill Dominique's family, who are being held hostage by the Dark Army. Darlene reluctantly agrees to help and asks for her phone to disclose the location. When the phone is tracked to Krista's apartment but Elliot is nowhere to be found, an angry Janice phones her henchmen to order Dominique's family's death. However, no one answers her call. She then checks Dominique's phone, and realizes that she had Irish mobster Deegan Maguire (Alex Morf) and his men rescue her family and kill the Dark Army agents. Dominique pulls out the knife and stabs a henchman, then grabs his gun and kills Janice and the two henchmen. Dominique calls the authorities, but tells Darlene to leave and find Elliot.

With an hour left before the Deus meeting, Mr. Robot (Christian Slater) talks with Elliot at Allsafe. Mr. Robot apologizes for hiding the truth from Elliot, as he wanted to give Elliot a good memory of his father. When Mr. Robot offers to leave, Elliot admits that he was the father he needed. As Elliot states that he wouldn't be the same person if it wasn't for Mr. Robot, he breaks down.

== Production ==
=== Development ===
The episode was written by Robbie Pickering and directed by series creator Sam Esmail. This was Pickering's first writing credit, and Esmail's 33rd directing credit.

== Reception ==
=== Viewers ===
In its original American broadcast, "408 Request Timeout" was seen by an estimated 0.376 million household viewers with a 0.1 in the 18-49 demographics. This means that 0.1 percent of all households with televisions watched the episode. This was a slight increase in viewership from the previous episode, which was watched by an estimated 0.361 million household viewers with a 0.1 in the 18-49 demographics.

=== Critical reviews ===
"408 Request Timeout" received extremely positive reviews from critics. The review aggregator website Rotten Tomatoes reported an 100% approval rating for the episode, based on 8 reviews.

Alex McLevy of The A.V. Club gave the episode an "A–" grade and wrote, "And so we end on an open wound of a scene, the emotional counterpoint to Dom's actual open wound. Elliot's hunched, weeping form, being gently held by the person created to make him feel safe, is the embodiment of the hurt visited upon all those who have suffered through this tragic story. And the sense that he just can't go through with his plan, that he's not psychologically capable anymore? Maybe he's right. Maybe both Elliot and Mr. Robot are in no shape to handle this. Sounds like that might require a third person."

Kyle Fowle of Entertainment Weekly wrote, "Just as Elliot is finally approaching the moment he's been waiting for, he's dealt a brutal blow that may seal his fate once and for all." Alicia Gilstorf of Telltale TV gave the episode a 4 star rating out of 5 and wrote, "This episode just goes to show that with phenomenal acting and writing at a series' disposal, viewers will be happy to embrace pretty much anything thrown our way."

Sean T. Collins of The New York Times wrote, "Ending one of the final episodes of a riveting techno-thriller on that note of powerlessness is a bold choice indeed." Vikram Murthi of Vulture gave the episode a 4 star rating out of 5 and wrote, "It's a 'badass' moment that feels earned not just because Dom has been so powerless this entire season, but also because Mr. Robot indulges in so few of them this late in the game."

Lacy Braugher of Den of Geek gave the episode a 3.5 star rating out of 5 and wrote, "does 'Request Timeout' really move the story forward in any serious way? Not really. And maybe that's the point. Maybe 'Request Timeout' isn't just the episode's title, but it's explanation, a statement that, for Elliot at least, this story needs a minute to reboot. Or at least to refresh the proverbial page, as our protagonist rearranges the central pieces of his existence into a new order." Paul Dailly of TV Fanatic gave the episode a perfect 5 star rating out of 5 and wrote, "After [this episode], it became clear that we've been underestimating Dom all along. Every single time Janice threatened Dom's family, Dom was scared at the prospect of losing her loved ones for not following orders."
