= EXit =

"eXit"
- Mr. Robot episode
- Episode no.: Season 4 Episode 11
- Directed by: Sam Esmail
- Written by: Sam Esmail
- Cinematography by: Tod Campbell
- Editing by: Melissa Lawson Cheung; Joe Leonard
- Original release date: December 15, 2019
- Running time: 52 minutes

Guest appearances
- Evan Whitten as Young Elliot; Vaishnavi Sharma as Magda Alderson; Ben Rappaport as Ollie Parker; Aaron Takahashi as Lloyd Chong

Episode chronology
← Previous "410 Gone"	Next → "whoami and Hello, Elliot"

"eXit" is the eleventh episode of the fourth season of the American drama thriller television series Mr. Robot. It is the 43rd overall episode of the series and was written and directed by series creator Sam Esmail. It originally aired on USA Network on December 15, 2019.

The series follows Elliot Alderson, a cybersecurity engineer and hacker with social anxiety disorder, who is recruited by an insurrectionary anarchist known as "Mr. Robot" to join a group of hacktivists called "fsociety". As the series progresses, Elliot finds himself at odds with his real persona and with Mr. Robot's plans. In the episode, Elliot goes to the Washington Township nuclear plant to destroy Whiterose's machine.

According to Nielsen Media Research, the episode was seen by an estimated 0.442 million household viewers and gained a 0.1 ratings share among adults aged 18–49. The episode received critical acclaim, with critics praising the episode's ambition, writing, performances and twists.

== Plot ==
As FBI agents raid the house of Whiterose (BD Wong), she applies make-up. She is escorted by Dark Army agents, revealing that they managed to kill the FBI team. Staring at a dying FBI agent, Whiterose says, "You were looking for Minister Zhang? He isn't here. He's dead. There is only Whiterose." before one of her men executes him.

After saying goodbye to Darlene (Carly Chaikin) at the motel, Elliot (Rami Malek) tells Mr. Robot (Christian Slater) that he will go to the Washington Township nuclear plant in order to destroy Whiterose's machine. Mr. Robot protests, so Elliot decides to go on his own. Elliot easily enters the plant due to the lack of employees and starts a hack to destroy it. However, he is captured by the Dark Army and taken to a room where Whiterose awaits. Whiterose opens up about feeling an outsider and her hatred of the world, feeling it would be better to destroy the current world and start a new one. Elliot says those who love him, even when he hates himself, make the world worth saving and that he won't support Whiterose's view.

With an alarm blaring, Whiterose reveals that the machine has been turned on ever since they caught Elliot. As a meltdown begins, Whiterose proclaims that everyone, including Angela, will be reborn through the new world. She then pulls out a gun and kills herself. Elliot is forced to use objects in the room in order to escape and uses a floppy disk titled "eXit" on an old Apple IIe computer. It displays an adventure game, which contains a message that asks Elliot to stay. Without any chance of stopping the meltdown, Elliot stays in the room. He and Mr. Robot express their love for each other as the plant explodes.

In an alternate universe, Elliot is depicted as a happy and upbeat man. After an earthquake, Elliot contacts Angela (Portia Doubleday). Their conversation reveals that they are planning to get married the next day, Edward is still alive, and Elliot is an only child, not having Darlene as his sister. After visiting Edward at the Mr. Robot repair shop, Elliot goes to Allsafe, where he is the CEO. E Corp is now known as F Corp, and a news report depicts Zhang as a beloved, wealthy woman known for her philanthropy. Elliot meets with F Corp's CEO, Tyrell (Martin Wallström), landing a major account after he states he will stand with Tyrell. Later, when the alternate Elliot returns home, he finds the Elliot familiar to the audience, wearing a hoodie, using his computer.

== Production ==
=== Development ===
The episode was written and directed by series creator Sam Esmail. This was Esmail's 22nd writing credit, and 36th directing credit.

== Reception ==
=== Viewers ===
In its original American broadcast, "eXit" was seen by an estimated 0.442 million household viewers with a 0.1 in the 18-49 demographics. This means that 0.1 percent of all households with televisions watched the episode. This was a slight decrease in viewership from the previous episode, which was watched by an estimated 0.452 million household viewers with a 0.1 in the 18-49 demographics.

=== Critical reviews ===
"eXit" received critical acclaim. The review aggregator website Rotten Tomatoes reported an 100% approval rating for the episode, based on 7 reviews.

Liz Shannon Miller of The A.V. Club gave the episode an "A–" grade and wrote, "On a production level, the penultimate episode of Mr. Robot is a relatively unflashy thing. On a narrative level, 'eXit' is perhaps one of the wildest episodes of the series yet, as Sam Esmail writes and directs an episode that begins in one reality, and ends in quite a different place."

Kyle Fowle of Entertainment Weekly wrote, "It's not uncommon for sci-fi storytelling to grapple with the idea of a hero having the opportunity to change the world. Time travel stories are ripe with the possibility for change, and the potential catastrophe that comes with altering something in our universe, even if the hero’s intentions are pure. Mr. Robot has been building to two moments: the first was the Deus Group hack, the cornerstone of four seasons of anti-capitalist struggle. The second moment comes in 'eXit,' as the teases about Whiterose's potential time-and-space altering machine finally comes to a climax, and Elliot finds himself face-to-face with... himself." Alicia Gilstorf of Telltale TV gave the episode a 4.5 star rating out of 5 and wrote, "Even with a catastrophic twist like this looming over the episode, 'eXit' still manages to feel like the start of a proper goodbye."

Sean T. Collins of The New York Times wrote, "Mr. Robot has taken us to a lot of strange places, and this, with just hours remaining in the series, is the strangest yet. And here I am, still happy to be along for the ride." Vikram Murthi of Vulture gave the episode a 3 star rating out of 5 and wrote, "After weeks of staying on the straight and narrow, Esmail finally veers into what-the-fuck territory with unabashed confidence. It's the kind of episode whose emotional weight partially hinges on a text adventure video game before transitioning into Lost territory."

Lacy Braugher of Den of Geek gave the episode a perfect 5 star rating out of 5 and wrote, "Mr. Robot is a series that has long relied on puzzle boxes and misdirection to tell its stories. It feels fitting that it's giving us one more before the final credits ever roll. Even if we probably deserve more than two episodes to figure out what it all means." Paul Dailly of TV Fanatic gave the episode a 4.75 star rating out of 5 and wrote, "It's been emotionally draining for viewers, but it has been a season full of moments true to the characters, so Sam Esmail and his team should pat themselves on the back that they are sticking the landing."
