= 410 Gone (Mr. Robot) =

- Mr. Robot episode
- Episode no.: Season 4 Episode 10
- Directed by: Sam Esmail
- Written by: Sam Esmail
- Cinematography by: Tod Campbell
- Editing by: Joel T. Pashby
- Original release date: December 8, 2019
- Running time: 45 minutes

Guest appearances
- Bobby Cannavale as Irving; Joey Badass as Leon; Don Guillory as FBI Agent; James Andrew O'Connor as Travis Rehwaldt

Episode chronology
| ← Previous "409 Conflict" | Next → "eXit" |

"410 Gone" is the tenth episode of the fourth season of the American drama thriller television series Mr. Robot. It is the 42nd episode of the series and was written and directed by series creator Sam Esmail. It originally aired on USA Network on December 8, 2019.

The series follows Elliot Alderson, a cybersecurity engineer and hacker with social anxiety disorder, who is recruited by an insurrectionary anarchist known as "Mr. Robot" to join a group of hacktivists called "fsociety". As the series progresses, Elliot finds himself at odds with his real persona and with Mr. Robot's plans. In the episode, Darlene, Dominique and Elliot prepare to go on the run from the Dark Army.

According to Nielsen Media Research, the episode was seen by an estimated 0.452 million household viewers and gained a 0.1 ratings share among adults aged 18–49. The episode received generally positive reviews from critics, with critics praising the focus on Darlene and Dominique, although some expressed disappointment at the lack of follow-up on Elliot's storyline.

== Plot ==
At a hospital, an injured Dominique (Grace Gummer) wakes up. As an FBI agent tells her she is suspended and being investigated, a news report states that the leak of files revealed Zhang (BD Wong) to be Whiterose. Dominique learns that her family is in a safehouse, but she is sad that they do not want to see her. She returns to her apartment, where Darlene (Carly Chaikin) visits her. Darlene wants to get Dominique to run away with her and Elliot (Rami Malek) as the Dark Army may target them, but a dejected Dominique is not interested. Darlene destroys Dominique's Alexa, telling her it's not a real friend, and forces her to leave.

They get to a motel where Elliot is waiting. He tells Darlene that he will not join them in their escape, as he plans to go to the Washington Township plant. Darlene gives him a phone with untraceable bank accounts and they hug before he leaves. Elliot gets Leon (Joey Badass) to take Darlene and Dominique to Boston. During a stop, Darlene and Dominique go to a park, where Darlene transfers a substantial portion of the Deus group's money to everyone with Ecoin accounts, seeing it as form of justice. Leon then drops them off at the airport, offering help to Darlene should she ever need it.

At Logan International Airport, Dominique panics when Irving (Bobby Cannavale) recognizes her at a bookstore. However, he tells her that the Dark Army is not going after her or Darlene, as they are focusing on a new strategy. He dismisses his role in Santiago's death and leaves after signing one of his books. Dominique confides this to Darlene, feeling they do not have to run away. Darlene is still adamant on leaving for Budapest, as she wants to be somewhere else but cannot do it alone. Dominique explains that she must look for her family and hugs Darlene before leaving. As Darlene is about to hand over her ticket at the boarding gate, she panics and goes to the restroom. Dominique had changed her mind and turned back to get to the boarding gate in time. Just as she arrives in the frame, Darlene goes into the restroom. Then the film cuts to the plane in an overhead shot and we see that Dominique has boarded but that Darlene has not boarded. In the restroom, Darlene slowly calms herself down. On the plane, Dominique stays on board even though Darlene is not on the plane seated next to her. As jet engines turn on, she falls asleep reading the book Irving gave her.

== Production ==
=== Development ===
The episode was written and directed by series creator Sam Esmail. This was Esmail's 21st writing credit, and 35th directing credit.

== Reception ==
=== Viewers ===
In its original American broadcast, "410 Gone" was seen by an estimated 0.452 million household viewers with a 0.1 in the 18-49 demographics. This means that 0.1 percent of all households with televisions watched the episode. This was a 24% increase in viewership from the previous episode, which was watched by an estimated 0.363 million household viewers with a 0.1 in the 18-49 demographics.

=== Critical reviews ===
"410 Gone" received generally positive reviews from critics. The review aggregator website Rotten Tomatoes reported an 100% approval rating for the episode, based on 7 reviews.

Alex McLevy of The A.V. Club gave the episode a "B" grade and wrote, "As it's done multiple times this season, Mr. Robot once more turns its attention to the fundamental need for human connection. But unlike most of those prior outings, here the message is more ambiguous, and less about the 'people who need people are the luckiest people on earth' theme Sam Esmail has been running down so elegantly. Instead, 'Gone' ends up being about how others can sometimes push us into dealing with our own weaknesses in ways we aren't prepared to admit, and it does so using the conventions of a rom-com road trip."

Kyle Fowle of Entertainment Weekly wrote, "I don't know if this is the last we'll see of Darlene and Dom — there are still three episodes to go — but if it is, it's a beautiful, bittersweet sendoff." Alicia Gilstorf of Telltale TV gave the episode a 3.5 star rating out of 5 and wrote, "Darlene has unfinished business being the 'key' and all. So it's not much of a surprise that '410 Gone' keeps her grounded. It is surprising to see how well Mr. Robot manages to break this news to the audience, however."

Sean T. Collins of The New York Times wrote, "After a series of white-knuckle episodes that built to Elliot and Darlene's successful hack of the world's most powerful people, 'Mr. Robot' finally took a little time off from the thrill-a-minute stuff. For all its low-key revelations and surprise returns, this week's episode was really about two people, Darlene Alderson and Dom DiPierro. Can these two crazy kids from opposite sides of the law-enforcement tracks put aside their differences and ride off into the sunset together? Well, no, apparently." Vikram Murthi of Vulture gave the episode a perfect 5 star rating out of 5 and wrote, "In the end, it was Darlene who needed to stay and carve out a new life and it was Dom who needed to escape the grind and take a much-needed vacation. If this is the last we see of either character, Esmail gives them both a helluva sendoff."

Lacy Braugher of Den of Geek gave the episode a 3.5 star rating out of 5 and wrote, "As an individual episode, 'Gone' is pretty solid. It's focused almost exclusively on the series' women, and provides some much-needed context to the emotional journeys both Dom and Darlene have been on this season. It's the first episode that's really incorporated anything resembling an emotional arc for Dom, and it gives Carly Chaikin and Grace Gummer plenty to do. But as a follow-up to last week's 'Conflict,' it leaves something to be desired."
