= City Island (film) =

- Theatrical release poster
- Directed by: Raymond De Felitta
- Written by: Raymond De Felitta
- Produced by: Raymond De Felitta; Andy Garcia; Lauren Versel; Zachary Matz
- Starring: Andy Garcia; Julianna Margulies; Steven Strait; Emily Mortimer; Ezra Miller; Dominik García-Lorido; Alan Arkin
- Cinematography: Vanja Cernjul
- Edited by: David Leonard
- Music by: Jan A.P. Kaczmarek
- Production companies: CineSon Entertainment; Medici Entertainment; NovaStar Digital
- Distributed by: Anchor Bay Films
- Release dates: March 23, 2009 (Hong Kong Filmart); March 19, 2010 (United States)
- Running time: 104 minutes
- Country: United States
- Language: English
- Budget: $6 million
- Box office: $7.9 million

City Island is a 2009 American comedy-drama film directed and written by Raymond De Felitta and starring Andy Garcia, Julianna Margulies, Alan Arkin, Emily Mortimer and Ezra Miller. It premiered at the Tribeca Film Festival in New York City on April 26, 2009. The title refers to the Bronx's City Island, where the film is set.

== Plot ==
Living on City Island, in the Bronx, Vince Rizzo, a prison guard, is the father of a dysfunctional family whose members all have secrets. Vince discovers that his secret illegitimate son is now the 24-year-old prison inmate Tony Nardella who is being held in the same prison where he works. Without revealing this truth to his family, Vince consequently gets Tony out of prison and employs him as hired help at his own home in order to become closer with his unknowing son. Vince has also been secretly taking acting lessons, taught by Michael Malakov, and begins to form a platonic bond with Molly, an aspiring actress.

Meanwhile, Vince's 20-year-old daughter Vivian (played by the real-life daughter of her on-screen father) has not told her family that she has been suspended from college, lost her scholarship, gotten breast implants, and become a stripper to try to pay for her next semester; their youngest teenage child, Vinnie, has a secret sexual fetish for feeding large women, and fantasizes about their obese next-door neighbor, Denise; and Vince's wife, Joyce, thinking she has lost all marital intimacy, sexually pursues Tony without realizing that he is her stepson.

Vince successfully auditions for a part in a Martin Scorsese film, while his wife and Tony seek each other's sexual attention. Vince, Jr. befriends the neighbor, who helps to bring him closer to an overweight girl, Cheryl, whom he has been attracted to at school.

Tensions rise as the family's many dysfunctions come to a head. Tony, finally deciding to escape the insanity of the Rizzo household, steals their car but finds Vivian working at the strip club. Just before the group is nearly torn apart in a violent outburst, Vince reveals the truth about everything, with Tony discovering in amazement that the dysfunctional family he sought to escape is actually his own. Vivian and the others admit their faults and Vince acknowledges the family's problems with the desire to work them out. The finally relieved group reunites in forgiveness toward one another, welcoming the overwhelmed Tony as a new member of their bizarre but loving family. Vince lands the film role.

== Cast ==
- Andy García as Vince Rizzo Sr.
- Julianna Margulies as Joyce Rizzo
- Steven Strait as Tony Nardella
- Emily Mortimer as Molly
- Ezra Miller as Vince Rizzo Jr.
- Dominik García-Lorido as Vivian Rizzo
- Carrie Baker Reynolds as Denise
- Hope Glendon-Ross as Cheryl
- Alan Arkin as Michael Malakov
- Curtiss Cook as Matt Cruniff
- Sarah Saltzberg as the casting director
- Jee Young Han as the casting assistant

== Reception ==
=== Box office ===
City Island was a modest success, grossing $6,671,036 domestically and $7,875,862 worldwide based on a $6 million budget.

=== Critical reception ===
On the review aggregator website Rotten Tomatoes, 83% of 103 critics' reviews are positive. The website's consensus reads: "Raymond De Felitta combines warmth, humanity, and a natural sense of humor, and is abetted by Andy Garcia and an excellent ensemble cast." Metacritic, which uses a weighted average, assigned the film a score of 66 out of 100, based on 28 critics, indicating "generally favorable" reviews.

== Awards ==
- Received the First Place Audience Award at the Tribeca Film Festival.
