= David Moscow =

American actor

- Born: David Raphael Moscow; November 14, 1974 (age 51); The Bronx, New York, U.S.
- Occupations: Actor; producer; activist
- Years active: 1986–present

David Raphael Moscow (born November 14, 1974) is an American actor, producer and activist. He is best known for his role as young Josh Baskin in the 1988 film Big and as David Jacobs in the 1992 musical film Newsies.

== Career ==
In 1988, Moscow played Josh Baskin in Big, in which his character was magically transformed into an adult played by Tom Hanks. Moscow next played the role of David Jacobs in the 1992 musical film Newsies, co-starring opposite Christian Bale. Moscow also appeared in a leading role opposite Jessica Alba in the film Honey and starred on several network television series including Zoe, Duncan, Jack & Jane. He also featured on the television series Seinfeld as the character Lomez Jr in the episode "The Van Buren Boys".

Moscow has appeared in leading roles on Broadway, including the role of Artie in the production What's Wrong with This Picture at the Brooks Atkinson Theatre. He co-developed and co-produced Lin-Manuel Miranda's first production of In the Heights with his ex-fiance, actress Kerry Washington. As a producer, his 2012 project, Hellbenders, was acquired by Lionsgate for North American and foreign distribution; and his film, the psychological thriller Desolation, was his directorial debut and was partially funded by a successful Kickstarter campaign. Desolation was screened and honored at film festivals around the world including the Wroclaw Festival in Poland. Recent producing projects include Sylvio, The Jingoist, Blind, Easy Living and Thirst Street. He launched a Kickstarter campaign to help fund post-production with a video reenactment of the Zoltar "wish" scene from Big. The campaign raised more than $70,000.

With his father Jon, Moscow created From Scratch, a food show in which he travels to source all the ingredients to cook a recipe. The first two seasons screened on the History and FYI channels, the third and fourth on Tastemade, with the fifth season set to air on Tastemade in April 2025. In 2022, they published a book based on the series, called From Scratch: Adventures in Harvesting, Hunting, Fishing, and Foraging on a Fragile Planet, which became a gold winner in the 2023 Nautilus Book Awards. Kirkus Reviews praised it as "Unadulterated, smart, beautifully rendered, and often thrilling... This is delicious, adventuresome entertainment for the mind, soul, heart, and stomach." In December 2025, From Scratch launched all five seasons on NBCUniversal's streaming service Peacock with its sixth season premiering exclusively on the platform early in February 2026. Newsweek has commended the show stating that “There is no food and travel show like it on television, not in America, not in the world. It is riveting, addictive, inspirational.”

Moscow has a long history as an activist, which began in 1992 after he dropped out of college to track wolves for the Round River Conservations Studies. He built a mixed-income green housing facility in Harlem in 2006. In 2007, the magazine Time Out New York reported Moscow's involvement in developing sustainable and economic housing in Harlem.

== Personal life ==
Moscow was born in the Bronx, the son of Patricia (née Sterner) and Jon Moscow. His mother's family is from Montana. His father is Jewish, and his mother is Mormon, but he was not raised in either religion. He attended Hampshire College in Amherst, Massachusetts, in the 1990s.

Moscow is married to Karen Moscow. Moscow was engaged to actress Kerry Washington from October 2004 to March 2007.

== Filmography ==
- I'll be Home for Christmas (1988) — David Bundy
- The Wizard of Loneliness (1988) — Jimmy Wiggen
- Big (1988) — Young Josh Baskin
- Live-In (1989) (television series) — Peter Matthews
- Living Dolls (1989) (television series) — Rick Carlin
- Newsies (1992) — David Jacobs
- White Wolves: A Cry in the Wild II (1993) — Adam
- Hurricane Streets (1998) — Shane
- Girl (1998) — Greg
- Side Streets (1999) — Bellboy
- Restaurant (1998) — Reggae
- Zoe, Duncan, Jack & Jane (1999) (television series) — Duncan Milch
- Loving Jezebel (2000) — Gabe Parks
- Riding in Cars with Boys (2001) — Lizard Hasek
- Just Married (2003) — Kyle
- Honey (2003) — Michael Ellis
- Nearing Grace (2005) — Blair Nearing
- David & Layla (2007) — David Fine
- The End of America (2008) — Executive producer
- Dead Air (2008) — Gil
- The Promotion (2008) – Painter
- Vacancy 2: The First Cut (2009) — Gordon
