= 409 Conflict (Mr. Robot) =

- Mr. Robot episode
- Episode no.: Season 4 Episode 9
- Directed by: Sam Esmail
- Written by: Kyle Bradstreet
- Cinematography by: Tod Campbell
- Editing by: Justin Krohn; Chris Guiral
- Original release date: December 1, 2019
- Running time: 47 minutes

Guest appearances
- Evan Whitten as Young Elliot; Vaishnavi Sharma as Magda Alderson; Jing Xu as Wang Shu

Episode chronology
← Previous "408 Request Timeout"	Next → "410 Gone"

"409 Conflict" is the ninth episode of the fourth season of the American drama thriller television series Mr. Robot. It is the 41st overall episode of the series and was written by executive producer Kyle Bradstreet and directed by series creator Sam Esmail. It originally aired on USA Network on December 1, 2019.

The series follows Elliot Alderson, a cybersecurity engineer and hacker with social anxiety disorder, who is recruited by an insurrectionary anarchist known as "Mr. Robot" to join a group of hacktivists called "fsociety". As the series progresses, Elliot finds himself at odds with his real persona and with Mr. Robot's plans. In the episode, Elliot and Darlene prepare to make the hack, while Price meets with Zhang at the Deus meeting.

According to Nielsen Media Research, the episode was seen by an estimated 0.363 million household viewers and gained a 0.1 ratings share among adults aged 18–49. The episode received critical acclaim, with critics praising the performances, writing, directing and atmosphere.

== Plot ==
In Elliot's (Rami Malek) mind, Mr. Robot (Christian Slater) talks with Elliot's mother, Magda (Vaishnavi Sharma), and young Elliot (Evan Whitten), asking them to help Elliot. They want to tell him what happened, but Mr. Robot wants to wait until after the hack is finished. He suggests showing what Elliot has done, and Darlene (Carly Chaikin) might be able to wake him.

At a motel room, Mr. Robot reunites with Darlene, refusing to say what happened to Elliot until he is ready. Before they begin the hack, Price (Michael Cristofer) visits them and gives them a USB flash drive, asking them to destroy Whiterose's machine to avenge Angela's death. He then leaves for the Deus meeting, finding only Zhang (BD Wong) present there. Zhang is aware that he cooperated with Elliot and offers him a peaceful death if he reveals their plan. Realizing that the Deus meeting was moved to a new location, Mr. Robot sends Darlene to check while he stays in the motel to watch over Price and Zhang.

Zhang is alarmed when he is informed that Tyrell is not at the Deus meeting. He is then called by Mr. Robot. Zhang offers him a deal, stating that if Elliot stops his plan, he will reunite Elliot with Angela, claiming that there is a place where she is still alive and offering to take him there. This wakes up Elliot, but Elliot refuses Zhang's offer of reuniting them. Darlene tells him to turn on the TV, where a news report shows a video of Darlene in an fsociety mask. In the video, she exposes the Deus Group, revealing their location at a restaurant and posting their private files. Zhang is inundated with concerned messages from the members due to the exposure, and advises them to stay inside the restaurant.

Elliot hacks a nearby cellphone tower to get Zhang's data, while Darlene blocks the restaurant's garage from opening, preventing the Deus members from leaving. As pedestrians overrun the nearby streets, the members barely manage to leave when the cars finally arrive. Elliot eventually discovers Whiterose's number and uses it to make a bank transfer, bankrupting the Dark Army. As Zhang leaves the museum, Price mocks him for letting Elliot humiliate him, also remarking that Angela lives on in her loved ones. Furious, Zhang shoots Price dead, which Elliot and Mr. Robot witness. As Zhang leaves in a car, he sees Elliot in the street. Later, the police raid Whiterose's house while she puts on her make-up, gunshots being heard through the building.

== Production ==
=== Development ===
The episode was written by executive producer Kyle Bradstreet and directed by series creator Sam Esmail. This was Bradstreet's ninth writing credit, and Esmail's 34th directing credit.

== Reception ==
=== Viewers ===
In its original American broadcast, "409 Conflict" was seen by an estimated 0.363 million household viewers with a 0.1 in the 18-49 demographics. This means that 0.1 percent of all households with televisions watched the episode. This was a slight decrease in viewership from the previous episode, which was watched by an estimated 0.376 million household viewers with a 0.1 in the 18-49 demographics.

=== Critical reviews ===
"409 Conflict" received critical acclaim. The review aggregator website Rotten Tomatoes reported an 100% approval rating for the episode, based on 8 reviews.

Alex McLevy of The A.V. Club gave the episode an "A–" grade and wrote, "This is all great fun to watch, in large part because we've spent so long watching the show set up these dominoes, and now it's knocking them down. But it also manages to generate tension right up to the very end."

Kyle Fowle of Entertainment Weekly wrote, "One massive goal may have been achieved here, but there's still a very uncertain future unraveling before them." Alicia Gilstorf of Telltale TV gave the episode a 4 star rating out of 5 and wrote, "Mr. Robot delivers an episode that is equal parts triumphant and terrifying."

Sean T. Collins of The New York Times wrote, "there's still that nagging suspicion that maybe there really is something to Whiterose's grandiose claims. It is fitting, given Whiterose's obsession with time, that only time will tell." Vikram Murthi of Vulture gave the episode a 4 star rating out of 5 and wrote, "Esmail and company have been super cagey with this final twist, which I assume they'll keep close to the chest for as long as possible. While the type of circular dialogue and obfuscating language employed in the first scene represent Mr. Robot at its worst, they do present one last mystery for Elliot. There's still 'the other one' out there."

Lacy Braugher of Den of Geek gave the episode a perfect 5 star rating out of 5 and wrote, "All of these things are potentially intriguing stories, but are they necessary ones? We've never been closer to Mr. Robot's conclusion – and somehow, it's still never felt further away." Paul Dailly of TV Fanatic gave the episode a perfect 5 star rating out of 5 and wrote, "This episode may well be one of the show's best, and that's saying something. Mr. Robot Season 4 has been remarkable. Now, it's all down to Sam Esmail and whether he can stick the landing."
