= Eps3.4 runtime-error.r00 =

"eps3.4_runtime-error.r00"
- Mr. Robot episode
- Protestors break into and riot inside E Corp building.
- Episode no.: Season 3 Episode 5
- Directed by: Sam Esmail
- Written by: Kor Adana; Randolph Leon
- Original air date: November 8, 2017
- Running time: 45 minutes

Episode chronology
← Previous "eps3.3 metadata.par2"	Next → "eps3.5 kill-process.inc"

"eps3.4_runtime-error.r00" is the fifth episode of the third season of the American thriller drama television series Mr. Robot. The episode is presented as a single, continuous shot and was described by critics as among the year's best television episodes.

== Plot ==
With no memory of the past four days, and on the day of the UN vote, Elliot goes into work. He realizes he's been fired and that Stage 2 is going to happen today. He tries to evade security to shut it down, but is caught and escorted out. He tries calling in a bomb threat to get the target building evacuated, while a large gathering of anti E Corp protesters gathers at headquarters.

Darlene appears, admitting she's working with the FBI and that Angela is working with Mr. Robot, which helps Elliot remember his “lost” days. The protesters break into E Corp, terrifying the workers. Irving calls Angela, stating that the riot is a distraction so they can send Elliot in to copy important data from a hardware security module in a secure room as a prerequisite to Stage 2.

Angela hears that the UN agreed to China’s annexation of the Congo, then is approached by a suspicious security guard. She attracts the protesters, who attack the security guard, so she can complete the assignment intended for Elliot, then passes the data to a Dark Army agent. Elliot confronts her in the chaos, asking if there's something she needs to tell him.

== Production ==
The episode was shot to appear as a "one take": a single, continuous shot. Series creator and director Sam Esmail chose the style to convey the seamlessness of experience between characters Elliot and Angela. Since the set was split between Manhattan and Brooklyn, a single take proved impossible. Some shots included up to 15 cues and 27 takes. For the shots that floated between the Evil Corp skyscraper and the riots outside, cinematographer Tod Campbell and camera operator Aaron Medick used a Trinity stabilizing arm. The crew originally planned to let the hour progress in real time, swapping between individuals, but arrived at the one take for its heightened drama. Esmail stated that he was not interested in attempting the long take for showmanship purposes, but felt that the style was the best means for his desired tone.

USA Network broadcast the show without commercial interruption.

== Reception ==
Critics considered the episode among 2017's best. The New York Times described the episode as "exceptional", among the year's most unforgettable, and at the limits of television as an art form. Vox wrote that it "captured the freewheeling chaos that is being alive in 2017", that "everything is under control and nothing makes sense". Vox praised, in particular, the "dizzying, surreal", continuous shot that transferred between Angela in a high-security room and the protestors many floors below. On Rotten Tomatoes, the episode has an approval rating of 93% based on 14 reviews with an average score of 9.12 out of 10; the website's critical consensus reads, "A searing look at corporate greed and banality, with dazzling editing, makes for one of the strongest episodes of the season."

Reviewers criticized Angela's portion of the episode as less coherent. The New York Times felt that Angela's performance was slow and that the sequence in which she searched for the USB drive was unsuited for real-time storytelling.

In its initial broadcast on USA Network on November 8, 2017, the episode received 521,000 viewers.
