= Dominik García-Lorido =

American actress (born 1983)

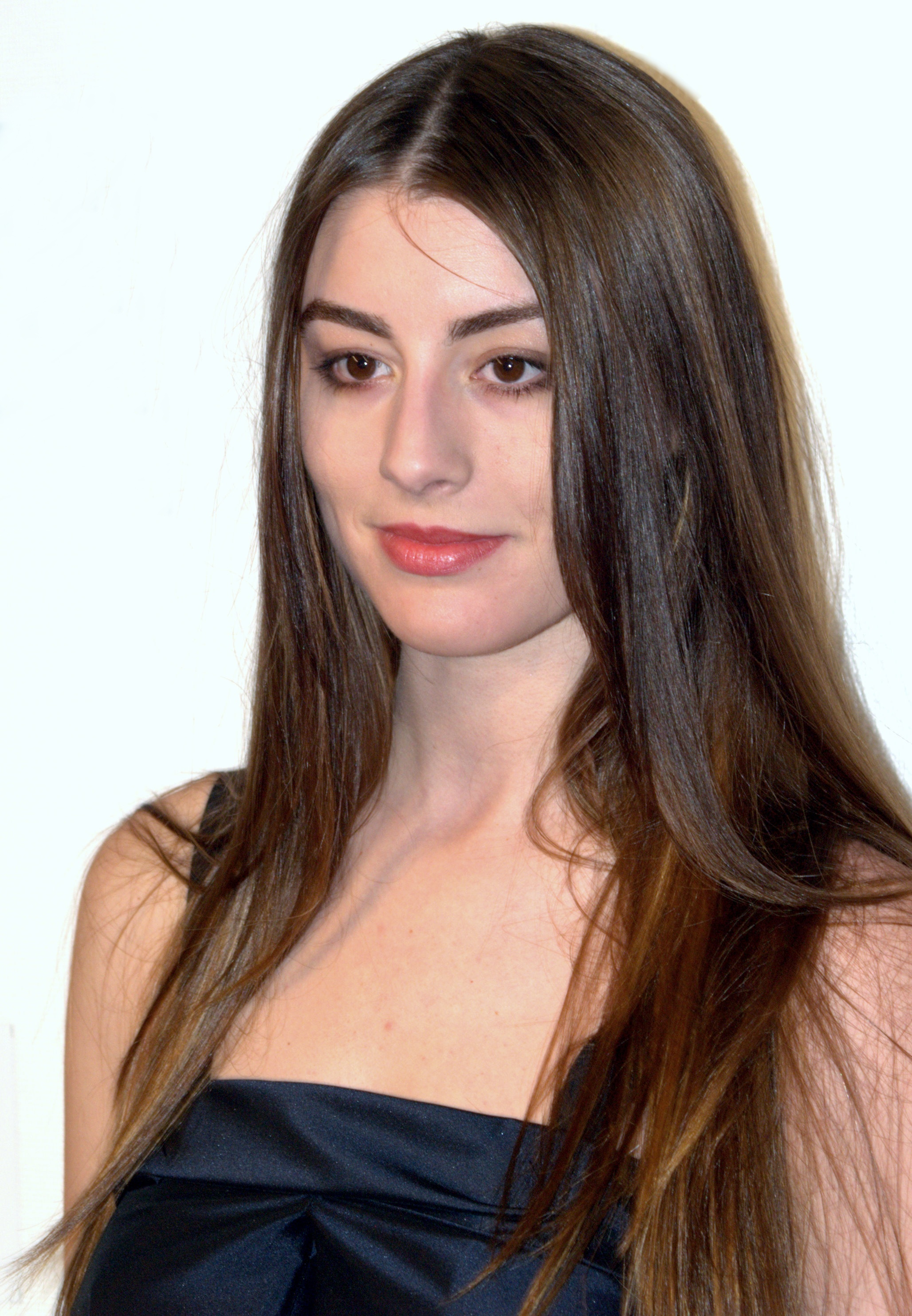
- García-Lorido in 2009
- Born: Dominik Cristina García-Lorido; August 16, 1983 (age 43); Miami, Florida, U.S.
- Occupation: Actress
- Years active: 1995, 2004–present
- Father: Andy García

Dominik Cristina García-Lorido (born August 16, 1983) is an American actress. She is best known for her roles in The Lost City as Mercedes Fellove and City Island as Vivian Rizzo (the daughter of the character played by her real-life father, Andy García). She was a main cast member in the Starz drama Magic City (2012–2013).

== Early life ==
García-Lorido was born on August 16, 1983, in Miami, Florida to Maria Victoria "Marivi" Lorido and actor Andy García. She is the eldest of four children, with sisters Daniella and Alessandra, and brother Andrés. Her parents are both of Cuban descent. Her father who was born in Havana is of Spanish descent and her maternal grandparents were from Taramundi, Asturias, Spain. She grew up in Los Angeles and began dancing at the age of three.

== Career ==
García-Lorido's debut was in 2005's The Lost City, a film directed by her father, who also starred in it, having taken 15 years to enter production. It reinforced García-Lorido's desire to act professionally and work more with her father.

García-Lorido eventually received more substantial roles. In 2008, she appeared in three films, including the racially-charged drama I Am Somebody: No Chance in Hell as well as Reflections and La Linea, the last of which starred her father. In 2009, García-Lorido appeared in the feature film City Island, as the onscreen daughter of her real-life father.

In 2019, she was featured in the third and sixth episodes of the final season of the television series Mr. Robot, which starred Rami Malek and Christian Slater.

== Filmography ==
=== Film ===
Year	Title	Role
1995	Steal Big Steal Little	Maria Martinez
2004	Last Goodbye	Reagan
2005	The Lost City	Mercedes Fellove
2007	Luz del mundo	Luz
2008	I Am Somebody: No Chance in Hell	Mary
2008	Reflections	Kate
2008	La linea	Woman in the Red Dress
2009	City Island	Vivian Rizzo
2010	Magic City Memoirs	Veronica Suarez
2015	Wild Card	Holly
2016	Desolation	Katie
2019	Bottom of the 9th	Tammy

=== Television ===
Year	Title	Role
2012–2013	Magic City	Mercedes Lazaro
2017	Blue Bloods	Tina Araya
2019	Mr. Robot	Olivia Cortez
