= Eps2.9 pyth0n-pt1.p7z =

"eps2.9_pyth0n-pt1.p7z"
- Mr. Robot episode
- Episode no.: Season 2 Episode 11
- Directed by: Sam Esmail
- Written by: Sam Esmail
- Cinematography by: Tod Campbell
- Editing by: Franklin Peterson
- Original release date: September 14, 2016
- Running time: 47 minutes

Guest appearances
- BD Wong as Whiterose; Sakina Jaffrey as Antara Nayar; Omar Metwally as Ernesto Santiago; Jeremy Holm as Donald "Mr. Sutherland" Hoffman

Episode chronology
← Previous "eps2.8 h1dden-pr0cess.axx"	Next → "eps2.9 pyth0n-pt2.p7z"

"eps2.9_pyth0n-pt1.p7z" is the eleventh episode of the second season of the American drama thriller television series Mr. Robot. It is the 21st overall episode of the series and was written and directed by series creator Sam Esmail. It originally aired on USA Network on September 14, 2016.

The series follows Elliot Alderson, a cybersecurity engineer and hacker with social anxiety disorder, who is recruited by an insurrectionary anarchist known as "Mr. Robot" to join a group of hacktivists called "fsociety". In the episode, Elliot tries to find more about Mr. Robot's methods, while Angela is taken to a house for questioning.

According to Nielsen Media Research, the episode was seen by an estimated 0.686 million household viewers and gained a 0.3 ratings share among adults aged 18–49. The episode received positive reviews from critics, praising the episode's ambition and style, although some criticized the episode's lack of answers and pacing.

== Plot ==
In the aftermath of the shootout, Dominique (Grace Gummer) is informed by Santiago (Omar Metwally) that she will be taken off the case. She wants to declare the attack as an act of war by the Dark Army, but finds that the government will not upset China after they just gave the U.S. a $2 trillion loan. Price (Michael Cristofer) uses the bailout money to strengthen Ecoin, E Corp's digital currency, forcing the government to support him to keep pace with China and rebuild the banking sector.

Angela (Portia Doubleday) is taken to a house by the two figures. There, she is questioned by an apparently tortured young girl on many strange scenarios, who tells her that she (the girl) will be punished if Angela refuses to answer. After the interview is over, the girl walks out of the room. Whiterose (BD Wong) appears, revealed to be Angela's captor. Whiterose reveals that the girl is actually wearing make-up, and that it was a test for Angela, as she should have died on the 5/9 hack. Whiterose also reveals that they have plans for her and Elliot (Rami Malek), telling her that the deaths of her mother and Elliot's father were necessary. After leaving, Angela informs Antara (Sakina Jaffrey) that she won't pursue any action and is no longer her client.

Elliot decides to use a lucid dreaming technique, allowing him to see Mr. Robot (Christian Slater) decode a message. He discovers a phone number, which leads him to an address where a taxi awaits him. After he enters, he is joined by Tyrell (Martin Wallström), who is alive and well. When Elliot questions the driver, they are kicked out of the taxi. Seeing that Elliot can't recall the events, Tyrell tells him that the Dark Army's Stage 2 is ready and that Elliot will be pleased with the results.

== Production ==
=== Development ===
In September 2016, USA Network announced that the eleventh episode of the season would be titled "eps2.9_pyth0n-pt1.p7z". The episode was written and directed by series creator Sam Esmail. This was Esmail's eleventh writing credit, and fourteenth directing credit.

== Reception ==
=== Viewers ===
In its original American broadcast, "eps2.9_pyth0n-pt1.p7z" was seen by an estimated 0.686 million household viewers with a 0.3 in the 18-49 demographics. This means that 0.3 percent of all households with televisions watched the episode. This was a 11% decrease in viewership from the previous episode, which was watched by an estimated 0.765 million household viewers with a 0.3 in the 18-49 demographics.

=== Critical reviews ===
"eps2.9_pyth0n-pt1.p7z" received positive reviews from critics. The review aggregator website Rotten Tomatoes reported an 83% approval rating for the episode, based on 18 reviews. The site's consensus states: "The most brilliantly weird installment to date, 'Pyth0n-pt1.p7z' is a lucid odyssey full of riddles and clues and the astounding return of a key character."

Matt Fowler of IGN wrote, "The second half of Season 2, which has focused more on fsociety realizing that they're in way over their heads and were probably used as pawns (by Elliot's subconscious mind), has been a much better ride than the first half. But I still wish it had paced out its reveals a little better so that the upcoming season finale didn't have the extra burden of having to, pretty much, satisfy on all fronts."

Alex McLevy of The A.V. Club gave the episode a "B+" grade and wrote, "'Pyth0n-pt1.p7z' begins the process of pushing Mr. Robot into bold new territory, and that transition might be too much to accept for those who thought the show took place in our world, or at least a practical extension of ours. Much like the confusing whirlwind of events surrounding Angela Moss, the show is lurching out of the accepted reality that has anchored it to a universe recognizably our own."

Alan Sepinwall of Uproxx wrote, "This season, particularly in its second half, has pushed so much beyond that story, and emphasized its various mysteries over and over, that it will feel frustrating if we don't get at least some explanations next week – and ones that justify the amount of time Esmail has strung us along on them, even if he's done so with such great storytelling flair." Kyle Fowle of Entertainment Weekly wrote, "'eps2.9pyth0n-pt1.p7z' is perhaps, for lack of a better word, the trippiest episode of season 2. After last week's gut-punch of a thriller, tonight's episode is more muted in its delivery, but that doesn't mean it doesn't have teeth. In fact, this one might hit just as hard, but the shot goes for the brain instead of the gut."

Jay Bushman of IndieWire gave the episode an "A+" grade and wrote, "The episode opens will Elliot attempting to induce a lucid dreaming state so he can switch places with Mr. Robot and discovers what he's planning. This dream-like quality extends to the rest of the hour, a brief, fitful pause between the high-action end of last week and next week's season finale." Vikram Murthi of Vulture gave the episode a 3 star rating out of 5 and wrote, "While the tone of 'eps2.9_pyth0n-pt1.p7z' kept me on edge, and certain scenes had spark, it mostly felt like a Zen koan without any of the promised enlightenment. Here's hoping that Elliot and Tyrell's beautiful friendship leads somewhere in the finale."

Alec Bojalad of Den of Geek gave the episode a perfect 5 star rating out of 5 and wrote, "I almost never believe that shows can stick the landing when it comes to finales. It's such a difficult feat to rationally conclude a season of 12-24 episodes. But Mr. Robot by becoming more inscrutable every week has paradoxically made it clearer and clearer that the end will somehow satisfy. Because how could it not? Just even to gain a semblance of clarity. in some ways, however, I hope they don't. This feeling of the apocalyptic schizophrenia is hard to top." Caralynn Lippo of TV Fanatic gave the episode a 4.5 star rating out of 5 and wrote, "As is now the usual for Mr. Robot, 'Python' was an artistic dream, but it was super, super slow – especially after the tense cliffhanger we left off on and especially since this is part one of the two-part season finale."
