= Eps3.2 legacy.so =

"eps3.2_legacy.so"
- Mr. Robot episode
- Episode no.: Season 3 Episode 3
- Directed by: Sam Esmail
- Written by: Sam Esmail
- Cinematography by: Tod Campbell
- Editing by: Rosanne Tan
- Original release date: October 25, 2017
- Running time: 49 minutes

Guest appearances
- Michael Drayer as Francis "Cisco" Shaw; Omar Metwally as Ernesto Santiago; Erik Jensen as Frank Cody; Grant Chang as Grant; Joey Badass as Leon; Wallace Shawn as Mr. Williams

Episode chronology
← Previous "eps3.1 undo.gz"	Next → "eps3.3 metadata.par2"

"eps3.2_legacy.so" is the third episode of the third season of the American drama thriller television series Mr. Robot. It is the 25th overall episode of the series and was written and directed by series creator Sam Esmail. It originally aired on USA Network on October 25, 2017.

The series follows Elliot Alderson, a cybersecurity engineer and hacker with social anxiety disorder, who is recruited by an insurrectionary anarchist known as "Mr. Robot" to join a group of hacktivists called "fsociety". In the episode, Tyrell's actions after the Five/Nine attack are revealed.

According to Nielsen Media Research, the episode was seen by an estimated 0.542 million household viewers and gained a 0.2 ratings share among adults aged 18–49. The episode received mixed reviews from critics, with some debating over the necessity of giving an entire episode to Tyrell.

== Plot ==
In a flashback to the night of the 5/9 hack, Tyrell (Martin Wallström) witnesses Elliot (Rami Malek) performing the hack on the computer. While Tyrell stares at the computer, Elliot takes the gun from the popcorn machine, and Mr. Robot (Christian Slater) now holds Tyrell at gunpoint. As Tyrell pleads for his life, Mr. Robot pulls the trigger but the gun jams and does not fire. Tyrell views this as a miracle and convinces Mr. Robot to involve him in Stage 2.

As they plan their next move, Irving (Bobby Cannavale) arrives with two Dark Army agents. Irving instructs Mr. Robot to leave in Tyrell's SUV and tells Tyrell that Gideon has informed the authorities that Tyrell has shut down the honeypot. While Tyrell debates on leaving with Irving, Mr. Robot tells him to go as his face will be on the news. Tyrell is taken to a cabin, where he chooses not to contact Joanna (Stephanie Corneliussen), for their sake. Irving informs him the area around the cabin is owned by the Dark Army, but that he is not to leave the cabin nonetheless. While this is happening, Elliot is arrested for stealing Lenny's dog. Upon learning this, Zhang (BD Wong) assigns Leon (Joey Badass) to protect Elliot while he gets the Dark Army to work on getting him released.

Tyrell is visited by Mr. Williams (Wallace Shawn), who conducts a psychological test. The test involves Tyrell being honest about his affairs, his relationship with Joanna, his involvement in Sharon's death, and if he will be loyal to Mr. Williams himself. Tyrell answers everything, but declares that while he won't be loyal to Mr. Williams, as he will always be loyal to Elliot. Satisfied, Tyrell is given a personal laptop to start working on Stage 2. Tyrell asks to talk to Elliot, and he gets to call him while he is in prison. Cisco (Michael Drayer) also provides the Dark Army with firmware, which Tyrell uses to engineer Stage 2.

After learning of Joanna's affair, Tyrell decides to ignore Irving's warning and leaves the area. However, he is recognized by a police officer and arrested. The officer taking him to FBI custody is killed by Santiago (Omar Metwally), who is revealed to be working for the Dark Army. Santiago brings Tyrell back to Irving, scolding him for having him kill a police officer. Irving tells Tyrell that he must work in order to finally provide for his family, revealing that he wishes to reunite with his children someday. While going back to work, Irving is revealed to have no children. He later visits Leon in prison, telling him Elliot will be released.

Irving informs Tyrell of Elliot's release and they leave the cabin. He shows him the building across the street from E Corp, which they will use as a base of operations. He also tells Tyrell that he will get to meet Elliot in a taxi, but that he will have to wait at a Dark Army-controlled hotel to avoid detection. Tyrell decides to shave and get a suit, despite Irving's concern that he could be recognized, and goes to the taxi. Later, while Elliot is in surgery after having been shot, Tyrell talks with Angela (Portia Doubleday), who tells him that Elliot can become another person, revealing the existence of Mr. Robot. Elliot wakes up, and Angela stays with him. Once Elliot faces Tyrell, Mr. Robot smiles at Tyrell.

== Production ==
=== Development ===
The episode was written and directed by series creator Sam Esmail. This was Esmail's 15th writing credit, and 18th directing credit.

== Reception ==
=== Viewers ===
In its original American broadcast, "eps3.2_legacy.so" was seen by an estimated 0.542 million household viewers with a 0.2 in the 18-49 demographics. This means that 0.2 percent of all households with televisions watched the episode. This was a 4% increase in viewership from the previous episode, which was watched by an estimated 0.519 million household viewers with a 0.2 in the 18-49 demographics.

=== Critical reviews ===
"eps3.2_legacy.so" received mixed reviews from critics. The review aggregator website Rotten Tomatoes reported a 78% approval rating for the episode, based on 9 reviews. The site's consensus states: "In continuing to look backward, Mr. Robot finds a way to creatively thread the story from point A to B."

Alex McLevy of The A.V. Club gave the episode a "B" grade and wrote, "Interestingly, this is one of the only episodes in Mr. Robot history that sets aside the mind games and just tells a relatively straightforward narrative, recounting the events from when Elliot and Tyrell entered the arcade, right up to the moment Elliot, as Robot, wakes up from his surgery, and plots with Angela. It's the history of Tyrell's journey, filling in the gaps of our central narrative while also providing more information on Irving."

Alan Sepinwall of Uproxx wrote, "It looked great, like usual, and the more we learn about Irving the more fascinated I am with him, but my impatience grew throughout the hour. Departures from Elliot's story can work incredibly well, as we saw last year with 'Successor.' This one just didn't." Kyle Fowle of Entertainment Weekly wrote, "'Eps3.2_1egacy.so' answers these questions, and the result is the best episode of the season so far, a self-contained flashback episode like no other that looks at how Tyrell and Elliot got to where they are now."

Jeremy Egner of The New York Times wrote, "While this was necessary to bring the story up to speed, it also asked viewers to invest in the quandaries of a character we haven't been conditioned to care much about, on an emotional level." Vikram Murthi of Vulture gave the episode a 2 star rating out of 5 and wrote, "'eps3.2_legacy.so' isn't a bad episode, per se. It's competent, it features a couple of nice music cues, and contains one good scene, courtesy of legendary actor Wallace Shawn. Beyond that, there's nothing much to say about it because it's almost entirely pointless."

Alec Bojalad of Den of Geek gave the episode a 4 star rating out of 5 and wrote, "Ultimately, the entirety of 'Legacy' is like Wallace Shawn as Mr Williams, himself. It's an unnecessary diversion. It's also an entertaining and enlightening one." Caralynn Lippo of TV Fanatic gave the episode a 4 star rating out of 5 and wrote, "If you love Tyrell Wellick, [the episode] would've been a fantastic hour of television for you. On the flip side, if you're less-than-impressed with Elliot's partner in crime, it would've felt like something of an unnecessary slog."
