= Eps3.1 undo.gz =

"eps3.1_undo.gz"
- Mr. Robot episode
- Episode no.: Season 3 Episode 2
- Directed by: Sam Esmail
- Written by: Sam Esmail
- Cinematography by: Tod Campbell
- Editing by: Justin Krohn
- Original release date: October 18, 2017
- Running time: 47 minutes

Guest appearances
- Gloria Reuben as Dr. Krista Gordon; Ramy Youssef as Samar Swailem; Omar Metwally as Ernesto Santiago; Erik Jensen as Frank Cody; Jeremy Holm as Donald "Mr. Sutherland" Hoffman; Chris Conroy as Derek; Armand Schultz as Lenny Shannon; Rizwan Manji as Norm Gill; Grant Chang as Grant

Episode chronology
← Previous "eps3.0 power-saver-mode.h"	Next → "eps3.2 legacy.so"

"eps3.1_undo.gz" is the second episode of the third season of the American drama thriller television series Mr. Robot. It is the 24th overall episode of the series and was written and directed by series creator Sam Esmail. It originally aired on USA Network on October 18, 2017.

The series follows Elliot Alderson, a cybersecurity engineer and hacker with social anxiety disorder, who is recruited by an insurrectionary anarchist known as "Mr. Robot" to join a group of hacktivists called "fsociety". In the episode, Elliot starts working in trying to prevent the hack, after getting a job at E Corp.

According to Nielsen Media Research, the episode was seen by an estimated 0.519 million household viewers and gained a 0.2 ratings share among adults aged 18–49. The episode received extremely positive reviews from critics, praising the twists and writing.

== Plot ==
After getting a job as a security analyst at E Corp, Elliot (Rami Malek) starts making his way up the corporate ladder. After five weeks, he has managed to send the company's records to a warehouse in Sioux Falls, South Dakota, as well as tipping off law enforcement to multiple felonies by some of the higher-ups. Eventually, he convinces a middle manager to digitize the paper records instead of moving them to the backup facility.

Darlene (Carly Chaikin) is revealed to be working for the FBI, but Dominique (Grace Gummer) pressures her into finding out more information from Elliot about his involvement with Tyrell. Darlene refuses to admit they are working together, until the FBI reveals that Tyrell called Elliot while he was in prison. She spends more time with Elliot at his apartment, planning to check on his computer while he sleeps. Elliot confronts her, and Darlene realizes that she is actually talking to Mr. Robot (Christian Slater). Desperate, Elliot decides to take Mr. Robot during a therapy session with Krista (Gloria Reuben), who only claims that he and Elliot were "compromised."

Joanna (Stephanie Corneliussen) participates in an interview with conspiracy theorist and a talk show host Frank Cody (Erik Jensen), where it is revealed that Scott Knowles was arrested for Sharon's murder. She also reveals that she has withdrawn her divorce papers, claiming she will always love Tyrell. She is confronted by Derek (Chris Conroy), accusing her of using him and not caring for him. As Mr. Sutherland (Jeremy Holm) calls him off, Derek shoots him and then kills Joanna with a gunshot to the head. Mr. Sutherland then kills Derek. At the morgue, Dominique is told by Santiago (Omar Metwally) that Joanna's baby will be put up for adoption, as Tyrell could be alerted.

At the 2015 G20 Antalya summit, Price (Michael Cristofer) announces that the majority of countries have signed the Five/Nine Economic Accord, which will allow the E Coin to be used as a currency, although China is opposed to using it. Afterwards, he meets with Zhang (BD Wong) to try and get China to sign. When he threatens to pull back on his plan to annex the Congo, Zhang reveals that he is using Angela (Portia Doubleday) against Price, warning him about the possible ramifications of any violation of their plan. Later, Zhang tells his associates that Stage 2 must happen on the same day as the UN vote on the Congo annexation, as a form of punishment for Price.

Elliot returns to his apartment, where he is confronted by Lenny (Armand Schultz). Lenny laments how Elliot can evade so many things, but eventually decides to give him back his dog as he dislikes paying for its bills. Elliot then starts hacking in his apartment, though his computer has been bugged by Darlene. Dominique is delighted upon the news, until Elliot appears at Darlene's safe house, having discovered she bugged his computer.

== Production ==
=== Development ===
The episode was written and directed by series creator Sam Esmail. This was Esmail's 14th writing credit, and 17th directing credit.

== Reception ==
=== Viewers ===
In its original American broadcast, "eps3.1_undo.gz" was seen by an estimated 0.519 million household viewers with a 0.2 in the 18-49 demographics. This means that 0.2 percent of all households with televisions watched the episode. This was a 24% decrease in viewership from the previous episode, which was watched by an estimated 0.681 million household viewers with a 0.3 in the 18-49 demographics.

=== Critical reviews ===
"eps3.1_undo.gz" received extremely positive reviews from critics. The review aggregator website Rotten Tomatoes reported a 91% approval rating for the episode, based on 11 reviews. The site's consensus states: "'EPS3.1_UNDO.GZ' delivers a poignant, chilling episode that keeps momentum building for the third season."

Alex McLevy of The A.V. Club gave the episode a "B" grade and wrote, "'Undo.gzh' is an episode that reveals a bit of the Mr. Robot formula, something the show has managed to keep artfully concealed for the most part. We've done this routine with Elliot before — in fact we've done it both previous years, and right around the same time in the season, too."

Alan Sepinwall of Uproxx wrote, "'Undo' was a reminder of how nimbly Mr. Robot can tell its story, but also of just how much story there is to move through at this stage of things. At times, it was as much pure fun as I can remember the show being while still staying on-mission, while at others, I felt like I needed to go to the craft store to get conspiracy board supplies just to keep track of it all." Kyle Fowle of Entertainment Weekly wrote, "This is an episode of subtle tension, of people being pulled in all sorts of directions and not knowing how to deal with it."

Liz Shannon Miller of IndieWire gave the episode a "B+" grade and wrote, "while Elliot tracking the FBI down is an important story beat, it didn't quite have the juice needed to give the episode the sort of powerful ending Mr. Robot often delivers. It was a good chapter in the story, but not destined to be a standout favorite." Vikram Murthi of Vulture gave the episode a 4 star rating out of 5 and wrote, "Mr. Robot is playing catch-up and cleaning house. Last week's season premiere had a fairly narrow focus but in 'Eps3.1undo.gz,' the series successfully expands the scope further without jeopardizing the season's nascent plan."

Alec Bojalad of Den of Geek gave the episode a 3.5 star rating out of 5 and wrote, "'Undo' is bold and satisfyingly inscrutable like all Mr. Robot episodes have been thus far and will likely be for the foreseeable future. At the same time I can't help but be worried by the very central concept that this episode, and the season thus far, is the 'undoing' of all progress." Caralynn Lippo of TV Fanatic gave the episode a 4.5 star rating out of 5 and wrote, "[The episode] was chock-full of forward plot momentum, memorable scenes, and incredible performances. Oh, and also one shocking death that I legitimately didn't see coming."
