= Eps2.6 succ3ss0r.p12 =

"eps2.6_succ3ss0r.p12"
- Mr. Robot episode
- Episode no.: Season 2 Episode 8
- Directed by: Sam Esmail
- Written by: Courtney Looney
- Cinematography by: Tod Campbell
- Editing by: Franklin Peterson
- Original release date: August 24, 2016
- Running time: 46 minutes

Guest appearances
- Azhar Khan as Sunil "Mobley" Markesh; Sunita Mani as Shama "Trenton" Biswas; Michael Drayer as Francis "Cisco" Shaw; Mark Moses as Older Man at Bar; Omar Metwally as Ernesto Santiago; Sandrine Holt as Susan Jacobs; J. Alphonse Nicholson as Andre; John Wojda as Steve

Episode chronology
← Previous "eps2.5 h4ndshake.sme"	Next → "eps2.7 init 5.fve"

"eps2.6_succ3ss0r.p12" is the eighth episode of the second season of the American drama thriller television series Mr. Robot. It is the eighteenth overall episode of the series and was written by Courtney Looney and directed by series creator Sam Esmail. It originally aired on USA Network on August 24, 2016.

The series follows Elliot Alderson, a cybersecurity engineer and hacker with social anxiety disorder, who is recruited by an insurrectionary anarchist known as "Mr. Robot" to join a group of hacktivists called "fsociety". In the episode, Darlene, Mobley, Trenton and Cisco face problems when they find more about Project Berenstain.

According to Nielsen Media Research, the episode was seen by an estimated 0.742 million household viewers and gained a 0.3 ratings share among adults aged 18–49. The episode received extremely positive reviews from critics, who praised the performances, tension and the absence of Elliot in the episode.

== Plot ==
In a flashback, Darlene (Carly Chaikin) meets with Mobley (Azhar Khan) and Trenton (Sunita Mani), introducing them to Elliot's newest plan in taking E Corp down.

In present day, Darlene, Mobley, Trenton and Cisco (Michael Drayer) learn that Project Berenstain is illegal surveillance of three million people for the Five/Nine investigation. As Darlene records a video to threaten E Corp, Mobley is paranoid as the FBI has rounded up 16 prime suspects with one reported dead, believing that the FBI might be closing in on them. Suddenly, they are interrupted when Susan Jacobs (Sandrine Holt) arrives home. As she has seen them and their equipment, they are forced to trap her in a pool room.

At a Fourth of July party, Angela (Portia Doubleday) goes on a date with a man when she runs into a friend of her father. He humiliates her for working at E Corp, prompting her to call out the fact that she has had more success than him in life. Bored with her date, she decides to spend time with an older man. Her date is later revealed to be an FBI agent, who decides to abandon his job when Angela ditches him.

Back at the smart house, Trenton releases Susan so she can use the bathroom. Susan accidentally knocks her head against the wall when trying to attack her. As the crew tries to find incriminating evidence from her emails, Susan recovers from her wound. Darlene decides to release Susan from her handcuffs, but then reveals that she recognized her as someone who laughed at the Washington Township leak after E Corp avoided repercussions. She surprises Susan by shocking her with a stun gun, causing her to fall into the pool due to her severe heart condition, killing her. She declares that it was done in self-defense and motivates Mobley and Trenton to escape, while she and Cisco destroy any incriminating evidence. They also take Susan's body to an animal shelter to incinerate it.

Mobley prepares to leave but is forced into an interrogation by Dominique (Grace Gummer), after she interviewed the owner of Darlene's stolen gun. Mobley refuses to cooperate and Santiago (Omar Metwally) forces Dominique to release him due to a lack of evidence. Mobley then arranges to meet with Trenton in order to flee. Trenton arrives at a coffee shop, and while Mobley does not arrive for two hours, someone approaches her. As she plans her next move, Darlene spends the night at Cisco's house. While he is showering, Darlene finds that he is communicating with the Dark Army, claiming that he has Darlene. She destroys his computer and when he steps out of the bathroom, she hits him with a baseball bat.

== Production ==
=== Development ===
In August 2016, USA Network announced that the eighth episode of the season would be titled "eps2.6_succ3ss0r.p12". The episode was written by Courtney Looney and directed by series creator Sam Esmail. This was Looney's first writing credit, and Esmail's eleventh directing credit.

== Reception ==
=== Viewers ===
In its original American broadcast, "eps2.6_succ3ss0r.p12" was seen by an estimated 0.742 million household viewers with a 0.3 in the 18-49 demographics. This means that 0.3 percent of all households with televisions watched the episode. This was a 13% increase in viewership from the previous episode, which was watched by an estimated 0.652 million household viewers with a 0.3 in the 18-49 demographics.

=== Critical reviews ===
"eps2.6_succ3ss0r.p12" received extremely positive reviews from critics. The review aggregator website Rotten Tomatoes reported a 100% approval rating for the episode, based on 16 reviews. The site's consensus states: "One of Mr. Robot's most haunting and suspenseful episodes, 'Successor' focuses on Darlene and fsociety, where the stakes have been raised immeasurably and the group is on the brink of collapse."

Matt Fowler of IGN wrote, "After last week's freaky reveal that Elliot had, in reality, been incarcerated for all of Season 2 thus far, it was very nice to get out of our hero's warped headspace, where layers upon layers of mental shields and trickery have made for a somewhat convoluted second season."

Alex McLevy of The A.V. Club gave the episode a "B" grade and wrote, "That's the problem with killing someone — after murder, any violence starts to seem within reasonable boundaries of behavior. But the betrayal of trust that came with Cisco's actions is an emotional gut punch. If one of the core people entrusted with the massive secret of Fsociety is actually selling her out, what's left?"

Alan Sepinwall of Uproxx wrote, "I'll be glad to see Elliot back, especially now that the overall plot is really moving again, but where his absence could have made 'Successor' feel like a filler episode, it instead gave us a more complete picture of what the life he abandoned has looked like while he's been talking Seinfeld with Leon and pretending to live with his mom." Jeff Jensen of Entertainment Weekly wrote, "It took me roughly half the episode to grieve what I wasn't getting and appreciate what Esmail was supplying. It was a taut, suspenseful outing; a needed investment in secondary characters; a solid riff on themes of estrangement; and honestly, a welcome mental vacation from brain-hurty shenanigans."

Jay Bushman of IndieWire gave the episode a "B" grade and wrote, "This week's episode is a showcase for Darlene, and Carly Chaikin makes the most of it. While Elliot may be the fevered brain behind fsociety, there's no question that Darlene is the one who makes it all work, and she gets to be behind the mask in the newest video." Genevieve Koski of Vulture gave the episode a perfect 5 star rating out of 5 and wrote, "'eps2.6_succ3ss0r.p12' delivers on this idea in spades, depicting a separate fantasy as it crumbles to the ground, while externalizing the paranoia and fear into a tense, thrilling episode."

Alec Bojalad of Den of Geek gave the episode a 3.5 star rating out of 5 and wrote, "Any episode that excludes Elliot Alderson as a character is fundamentally weaker for doing so but what Mr. Robot is able of getting done with some b-characters, a TASER and a karaoke night is admirable." Caralynn Lippo of TV Fanatic gave the episode a 4.25 star rating out of 5 and wrote, "Darlene has been spiraling all season, in Elliot's absence, and 'Successor' displayed the apex of that spiraling: cold-blooded murder."
