= Eps2.3 logic-b0mb.hc =

"eps2.3_logic-b0mb.hc"
- Mr. Robot episode
- Episode no.: Season 2 Episode 5
- Directed by: Sam Esmail
- Written by: Kyle Bradstreet
- Cinematography by: Tod Campbell
- Editing by: Franklin Peterson
- Original release date: August 3, 2016
- Running time: 51 minutes

Guest appearances
- Azhar Khan as Sunil "Mobley" Markesh; Sunita Mani as Shama "Trenton" Biswas; Omar Metwally as Ernesto Santiago; BD Wong as Whiterose; Ben Rappaport as Ollie Parker; Jordan Gelber as FBI Agent; Vaishnavi Sharma as Magda Alderson; Michael Maize as "Lone Star" Lockwood; Luke Robertson as RT; Olivia Washington as FBI Agent; Jeremy Holm as Donald "Mr. Sutherland" Hoffman; Craig Robinson as Ray Heyworth

Episode chronology
← Previous "eps2.2 init 1.asec"	Next → "eps2.4 m4ster-s1ave.aes"

"eps2.3_logic-b0mb.hc" is the fifth episode of the second season of the American drama thriller television series Mr. Robot. It is the fifteenth overall episode of the series and was written by co-executive producer Kyle Bradstreet and directed by series creator Sam Esmail. It originally aired on USA Network on August 3, 2016.

The series follows Elliot Alderson, a cybersecurity engineer and hacker with social anxiety disorder, who is recruited by an insurrectionary anarchist known as "Mr. Robot" to join a group of hacktivists called "fsociety". In the episode, Elliot seeks help from Ray's past, while Dominique visits China.

According to Nielsen Media Research, the episode was seen by an estimated 0.705 million household viewers and gained a 0.2 ratings share among adults aged 18–49. The episode received extremely positive reviews from critics, praising the performances, tension and ending.

== Plot ==
With Ray's computer, Elliot (Rami Malek) installs a malware in order to hack the FBI. By the following day, Ray's associate Lone Star (Michael Maize) checks on his progress. Elliot states that he needs to talk with RT (Luke Robertson), the system admin. Ray (Craig Robinson) accepts his request.

Darlene (Carly Chaikin) visits Angela (Portia Doubleday), telling her that they must help Elliot. She wants her help in wiping the FBI's records connecting her to the Allsafe CD, but she refuses to get involved. Joanna (Stephanie Corneliussen) is told by the park attendant, Kareem, that he cannot keep quiet any longer and that he fears the FBI might be watching him. She claims she will help him, although she actually has Mr. Sutherland (Jeremy Holm) kill him at his house and stage it to make it look like a robbery. Later, she gets a phone call from someone breathing heavily, possibly Tyrell.

Dominique (Grace Gummer) and an FBI team investigate Steel Mountain, finding a Raspberry Pi installed in a wall. Finding a connection with the Dark Amy, Dominique and an FBI team visit Beijing to meet with Minister Zhang, the Chinese Minister of State Security, who is actually Whiterose (BD Wong). Zhang rebuffs claims that the Dark Army was involved in the attack and invites the agents to a party. Zhang converses with Dominique, explaining concepts of time. The following day, at the office, gunmen kill some of the FBI agents. Dominique barricades herself and kills one of the gunmen.

Angela reunites with Ollie (Ben Rappaport) at a bar, but discovers that he wanted to sell her out to the FBI. After talking with Elliot, she decides to join Darlene in her quest. Elliot meets with RT, who enters through Tor to help Ray's computer. After he leaves, Elliot is surprised to discover that Ray runs a black market website trafficking drugs, weapons, and sex slaves. That night, Elliot is kidnapped by Ray's thugs, with Lone Star revealing that they have killed RT. Ray steps out of a car, scolding him after ignoring his warning not to look, and watches as his thugs brutally beat Elliot.

== Production ==
=== Development ===
In July 2016, USA Network announced that the fifth episode of the season would be titled "eps2.3_logic-b0mb.hc". The episode was written by co-executive producer Kyle Bradstreet and directed by series creator Sam Esmail. This was Bradstreet's second writing credit, and Esmail's eighth directing credit.

== Reception ==
=== Viewers ===
In its original American broadcast, "eps2.3_logic-b0mb.hc" was seen by an estimated 0.705 million household viewers with a 0.2 in the 18-49 demographics. This means that 0.2 percent of all households with televisions watched the episode. This was a 10% increase in viewership from the previous episode, which was watched by an estimated 0.637 million household viewers with a 0.3 in the 18-49 demographics.

=== Critical reviews ===
"eps2.3_logic-b0mb.hc" received extremely positive reviews from critics. The review aggregator website Rotten Tomatoes reported an 94% approval rating for the episode, based on 18 reviews. The site's consensus states: "After four episodes of preparatory groundwork, 'eps2.3_logic-b0mb.hc' brings the pieces all together in the most exciting episode of the season so far."

Matt Fowler of IGN gave the episode a "great" 8.4 out of 10 and wrote, "Though the Tyrell mystery is waning, in both importance and execution, I'm glad we found out what Ray was all about and I really enjoyed how it wound up being so much darker than I ever anticipated. It creates a wonderful contrast to the character's initial kindness. Likewise, I appreciated more time spent with Whiterose and the reveal of who she actually is, since she also was able to get super dark despite seemingly bonding with Dom."

Alex McLevy of The A.V. Club gave the episode an "A–" grade and wrote, "Darlene may be leading the revolution on the ground, but Elliot's war doesn't differentiate between scale. An attack on innocent people must be met, if it's possible. And Elliot has the means. He just might not have the functioning bone structure, after tonight."

Alan Sepinwall of HitFix wrote, "I don't think Sam Esmail wants to be a ruthless monster, so it'll be a matter of when, not if, we start finding out the other details and getting a clearer sense of the big picture for season 2. But with Elliot active again – and immediately in harm's way with Ray (who is turning out to be the Vera of this stage of season 2) – this was a good start." Jeff Jensen of Entertainment Weekly wrote, "Elliot wanted to be hope for a world plagued with evil. Instead, his curiosity had unleashed more woe and purchased a world of pain for himself. Kid, this ain't the Washington Township Library anymore."

Jay Bushman of IndieWire gave the episode a "B–" grade and wrote, "We don't believe for a second that he'll heed any of Mr. Robot's warnings, and it makes those scenes fall a bit flat. Which might be why we didn't see a lot of Mr. Robot tonight." Genevieve Koski of Vulture gave the episode a 4 star rating out of 5 and wrote, "After four episodes of swaggery table-setting and wheel-spinning, Mr. Robot finally starts to bring some of the pieces together in 'eps2.3_logic-b0mb.hc,' an episode that brings Elliot back into action, features a shoot-out in China, and introduces Angela to the core of FSociety."

Alec Bojalad of Den of Geek wrote, "We may be excited that our boy is hacking the FBI again but access to a computer and strong ideals just bring him a vicious beatdown in the end. Like only the best horror can." Caralynn Lippo of TV Fanatic gave the episode a 4.75 star rating out of 5 and wrote, "The episode was probably the most exciting of the season so far (aside from the Mr. Robot Season 2 Premiere's Gideon shooting). At just under the midway point of the Mr. Robot Season 2, the pieces are all falling into place."
