= Eps2.9 pyth0n-pt2.p7z =

"eps2.9_pyth0n-pt2.p7z"
- Mr. Robot episode
- Episode no.: Season 2 Episode 12
- Directed by: Sam Esmail
- Written by: Sam Esmail
- Cinematography by: Tod Campbell
- Editing by: Franklin Peterson
- Original release date: September 21, 2016
- Running time: 48 minutes

Guest appearances
- Azhar Khan as Sunil "Mobley" Markesh; Sunita Mani as Shama "Trenton" Biswas; Brian Stokes Mitchell as Scott Knowles; Omar Metwally as Ernesto Santiago; Joey Badass as Leon; Erik Jensen as Frank Cody; Chris Conroy as Derek

Episode chronology
| ← Previous "eps2.9 pyth0n-pt1.p7z" | Next → "eps3.0 power-saver-mode.h" |

"eps2.9_pyth0n-pt2.p7z" is the twelfth episode and season finale of the second season of the American drama thriller television series Mr. Robot. It is the 22nd overall episode of the series and was written and directed by series creator Sam Esmail. It originally aired on USA Network on September 21, 2016.

The series follows Elliot Alderson, a cybersecurity engineer and hacker with social anxiety disorder, who is recruited by an insurrectionary anarchist known as "Mr. Robot" to join a group of hacktivists called "fsociety". In the episode, Elliot discovers the Dark Army's Stage 2, while Darlene is pressured into testifying against fsociety.

According to Nielsen Media Research, the episode was seen by an estimated 0.852 million household viewers and gained a 0.4 ratings share among adults aged 18–49. The episode received mixed reviews from critics, with critics polarized over the closure to the season and the lack of resolution.

== Plot ==
In a flashback, Tyrell (Martin Wallström) meets with Elliot (Rami Malek) at his SUV to discuss Elliot's plan. (Note: The exact conversation that Tyrell and Mr. Robot had in "eps1.7 wh1ter0se.m4v".) Even though Tyrell is aware of his "dirty little secret", Elliot is not alarmed and sets out to leave. Tyrell wants to get involved in the plan, feeling that they are destined to become part of it.

In present day, Tyrell takes Elliot to a warehouse across the street from where E Corp is revealed to be gathering all its paper records. The warehouse is a front for the Dark Army, and Tyrell has been working there during his disappearance. Elliot then realizes that Stage 2 involves engineering an explosion at the backup facility to permanently destroy E Corp's data. Elliot confronts Mr. Robot (Christian Slater) over making him believe Tyrell was dead.

Darlene (Carly Chaikin) is revealed to have survived the shootout, but Cisco perished in the event. She is interrogated by Dominique (Grace Gummer), but refuses to cooperate in the investigation. Even when she is told that Vincent could testify against her, Darlene is not motivated into speaking. Dominique then brings up the bullet casing, stating she can link it to Darlene. To prove a point, Dominique shows Darlene part of her investigation, which has linked her, Elliot, and Angela (Portia Doubleday) to fsociety. She also reveals that Romero's death was actually not an attack by the Dark Army, but an accidental ricochet from his neighbor. Darlene, however, is more confused when she finds that Elliot is working with Tyrell.

Joanna visits the address that Elliot had given to her fixer as Tyrell's supposed location. The house belongs to Scott Knowles (Brian Stokes Mitchell), revealed to be the person behind the gifts. Scott wanted to make her suffer like he did, although he later came to regret his actions. When she insults Sharon, Scott brutally attacks her. Joanna reveals the beating to Derek (Chris Conroy), convincing him to testify against Scott as Sharon's murderer.

Believing that Tyrell is not real, Elliot decides to erase the firmware hack, but Tyrell holds him at gunpoint. Elliot resists and Tyrell shoots him in the abdomen, proving that he is real. Tyrell explains that Mr. Robot had instructed him to shoot anyone who could interfere with the plan. Tyrell calls Angela, who was aware of his status as she was told he would call. Angela promises to be there, intending to be with Elliot when he wakes up, calming Tyrell for his actions. After she leaves, New York City suffers a power outage.

In a post-credits scene, Mobley (Azhar Khan) and Trenton (Sunita Mani) are revealed to be living new lives in Arizona. They now work at a Fry's Electronics store, under the names Frederick and Tanya. Trenton is trying to persuade Mobley in taking a look at her work, which might undo the hack, but they are interrupted by Leon (Joey Badass), who asks them the time.

== Production ==
=== Development ===
In September 2016, USA Network announced that the twelfth and final episode of the season would be titled "eps2.9_pyth0n-pt2.p7z". The episode was written and directed by series creator Sam Esmail. This was Esmail's twelfth writing credit, and fifteenth directing credit.

== Reception ==
=== Viewers ===
In its original American broadcast, "eps2.9_pyth0n-pt2.p7z" was seen by an estimated 0.852 million household viewers with a 0.4 in the 18-49 demographics. This means that 0.4 percent of all households with televisions watched the episode. This was a 24% increase in viewership from the previous episode, which was watched by an estimated 0.686 million household viewers with a 0.3 in the 18-49 demographics.

=== Critical reviews ===
"eps2.9_pyth0n-pt2.p7z" received mixed reviews from critics. The review aggregator website Rotten Tomatoes reported a 65% approval rating for the episode, based on 23 reviews. The site's consensus states: "Without providing the closure many viewers may have been looking for, 'Python, Pt. 2' delivers shocking reveals and thoroughly surprising cliffhangers in a finale that ultimately serves as a solidly enticing trailer for season 3."

Matt Fowler of IGN gave the episode an "amazing" 9 out of 10 and wrote in his verdict, "After a half season of trickery, and Elliot trying to get rid of (or make peace with) Mr. Robot, the story came full circle in the finale when Elliot believed he was being mentally duped when he wasn't. It was a massive miscalculation that got him shot while trying to stop a destructive plan he himself had created. Season 2's finale didn't give us all the answers we craved, but the show, by digging an even bigger conspiracy hole, gave us more of an indication that it knew where everything was headed."

Alex McLevy of The A.V. Club gave the episode a "B" grade and wrote, "It's easy to give Mr. Robot the benefit of the doubt, because it's proven worthy of that trust in the past. But stringing viewers along eventually becomes stringing viewers along, if you set up a bunch of dominoes and then refuse to knock them over. That's the problem with the present: At some point, it becomes the past, and even Whiterose can't stifle that temporal progression. This show offered up a hell of a lot of food for thought, this season. Just because it forgot the dessert doesn't mean we're leaving now."

Alan Sepinwall of Uproxx wrote, "Mr. Robot season 1 had its flaws and it had its moments to shine, and both aspects seemed more magnified in this longer, weirder season. Like Lost, the most satisfying and most frustrating aspects of Mr. Robot are coming from the same basic impulse to try things that no one's quite done before in TV, and that means I'm going to be patient even at the end of a season finale I found largely underwhelming." Jeff Jensen of Entertainment Weekly wrote, "We were prepared for apocalypse. Mind-blowing epiphany. Cosmic calamity. A tumble down the rabbit-hole, maybe even a trip through a wormhole. Instead, the season 2 finale of Mr. Robot gave us the anti-apocalypse."

Jay Bushman of IndieWire gave the episode a "B" grade and wrote, "And that's a wrap on Season 2 of Mr. Robot, which for the most part successfully navigated a very difficult job of expanding the very strange world that its built, while still keeping it fresh and surprising." Vikram Murthi of Vulture gave the episode a 2 star rating out of 5 and wrote, "In the end, 'eps2.9_pyth0n-pt2.p7z' is an especially frustrating finale because we know Mr. Robot can be good. Great, even. But when it gets caught up in its own head, it fails to see what's in front and what's above."

Alec Bojalad of Den of Geek wrote, "Overall, 'Python Pt. 2' is an excellent episode of television and an above-average finale. Still, I find myself disappointed with how much it lets up on its mindfuckery of us, the viewer." Caralynn Lippo of TV Fanatic gave the episode a 4.75 star rating out of 5 and wrote, "'Python Pt. 2"'was a great finale. The first half was quite slow, and they purposefully didn't wrap up every single plot line, but I actually feel satisfied with where we left off."
