= Eps2.8 h1dden-pr0cess.axx =

"eps2.8_h1dden-pr0cess.axx"
- Mr. Robot episode
- Episode no.: Season 2 Episode 10
- Directed by: Sam Esmail
- Written by: Kor Adana; Randolph Leon
- Cinematography by: Tod Campbell
- Editing by: John Petaja
- Original release date: September 7, 2016
- Running time: 43 minutes

Guest appearances
- Michael Drayer as Francis "Cisco" Shaw; Omar Metwally as Ernesto Santiago; Bruce Altman as Terry Colby; Erik Jensen as Frank Cody; Jeremy Holm as Donald "Mr. Sutherland" Hoffman; Christine Toy Johnson as Agent Yang

Episode chronology
← Previous "eps2.7 init 5.fve"	Next → "eps2.9 pyth0n-pt1.p7z"

"eps2.8_h1dden-pr0cess.axx" is the tenth episode of the second season of the American drama thriller television series Mr. Robot. It is the 20th overall episode of the series and was written by Kor Adana and Randolph Leon, and directed by series creator Sam Esmail. It originally aired on USA Network on September 7, 2016.

The series follows Elliot Alderson, a cybersecurity engineer and hacker with social anxiety disorder, who is recruited by an insurrectionary anarchist known as "Mr. Robot" to join a group of hacktivists called "fsociety". In the episode, Joanna asks Elliot to trace Tyrell's location, while Darlene and Cisco avoid authorities.

According to Nielsen Media Research, the episode was seen by an estimated 0.765 million household viewers and gained a 0.3 ratings share among adults aged 18–49. The episode received critical acclaim, with critics praising the performances, pacing and Esmail's directing.

== Plot ==
Terry Colby (Bruce Altman) meets with Price (Michael Cristofer), who asks a favor of him. Price wants Colby to use his political connections to allow China to annex the Congo in exchange for a financial bailout of E Corp. Colby accepts his request, although he is confused over Price's determination.

Joanna (Stephanie Corneliussen) takes Elliot (Rami Malek) to her house, asking him to find Tyrell Wellick. Even though Mr. Robot (Christian Slater) fears what Joanna could do, Elliot accepts her request to trace a phone call he made. While buying equipment from a store, the phone rings and Elliot hears a whisper before the call ends. He and Donald "Mr. Sutherland" Hoffman (Jeremy Holm), a fixer for Joanne, return to his apartment, where Elliot builds an antenna with the equipment. He manages to trace the call to a residence, although Mr. Sutherland is not certain Tyrell would be there.

Cisco (Michael Drayer) arrives back at the smart house with an injured fsociety member. Darlene (Carly Chaikin) refuses to get him to a hospital, but Cisco angrily demands that she take responsibility. The FBI investigates the smart house to find out more about Susan's disappearance. Dominique (Grace Gummer) is informed that a shootout after the Washington incident caused someone to flee while other suspects were arrested, and that a witness has identified Cisco. Santiago (Omar Metwally) decides to send a BOLO with Cisco's identity, despite Dominique's protest that the Dark Army may take action.

Elliot meets with Angela (Portia Doubleday) in the subway to apologize for getting her involved, as Angela plans to meet with her lawyer to confess her role in the FBI hack. She states that she found him yelling at the museum when he went missing, telling him not to trust Mr. Robot. After sharing a kiss, Elliot leaves, while Angela is approached by two figures. The injured member is stabilized, and Darlene and Cisco decide to go eat before visiting him later. Unbeknownst to them, the FBI has raided Cisco's house and the nurse has identified Cisco from a facial composite shown on TV. Dominique finds the restaurant where Darlene and Cisco are, and calls for back-up. When she goes inside to talk to them, a Dark Army gunman arrives and opens fire. Dominique fires back at the gunman, who kills himself moments before back up arrives. She walks out of the restaurant covered in blood spatters.

== Production ==
=== Development ===
In September 2016, USA Network announced that the tenth episode of the season would be titled "eps2.8_h1dden-pr0cess.axx". The episode was written by Kor Adana and Randolph Leon, and directed by series creator Sam Esmail. This was Adana's first writing credit, Leon's second writing credit, and Esmail's thirteenth directing credit.

== Reception ==
=== Viewers ===
In its original American broadcast, "eps2.8_h1dden-pr0cess.axx" was seen by an estimated 0.765 million household viewers with a 0.3 in the 18-49 demographics. This means that 0.3 percent of all households with televisions watched the episode. This was a 17% increase in viewership from the previous episode, which was watched by an estimated 0.651 million household viewers with a 0.3 in the 18-49 demographics.

=== Critical reviews ===
"eps2.8_h1dden-pr0cess.axx" received critical acclaim. The review aggregator website Rotten Tomatoes reported a 100% approval rating for the episode, based on 19 reviews. The site's consensus states: "Employing expertly paced tension, dazzling filmmaking and stunning plot developments, 'eps2.8_h1dden-pr0cess.axx' may very will be the most thrilling and satisfying episode of the season."

Alex McLevy of The A.V. Club gave the episode an "A–" grade and wrote, "'h1dden-pr0cess.axx' is often a frustrating episode of Mr. Robot, but it's also a deeply revealing one, in terms of representing the most important themes and concepts of the entire series. Its ellipses and subterfuges, like last week's installment, occasionally cross over into outright baiting, with more soap opera-style cliffhangers and messy plotting. But Sam Esmail's direction has never been more sure-footed, or his command of tone more in line with the very heartbeat of the show."

Alan Sepinwall of Uproxx wrote, "At a shade over 43 minutes without commercials, 'Hidden Process' is easily the shortest standalone episode of season 2. It's also, not coincidentally, the tightest and most suspenseful installment of the season, bringing various story threads together in a way that had more impact because – particularly in the second half – the story kept moving forward with a relentlessness making clear something very bad was about to happen. And then it did." Kyle Fowle of Entertainment Weekly wrote, "It's a relentless hour of television, one that wreaks havoc on your senses. I gasped, perspired, and bit my nails for the duration of the episode, and I'm sure I'm not alone. If 'eps2.8_h1dden-pr0cess.axx' teaches us anything, it's that we're never alone. There's always someone, or someones, lurking."

Jay Bushman of IndieWire gave the episode a "B+" grade and wrote, "This show has made some outlandish plot turns work in that past, but this one strains credulity. If they really are going this route, it may cause more trouble than it's worth, and invite the audience to question the reality of every person, place or thing in the show." Vikram Murthi of Vulture gave the episode a perfect 5 star rating out of 5 and wrote, "After the last two episodes ratcheted up the paranoia, 'eps2.8_h1dden-pr0cess.axx' sends everyone over the edge. It's not just one of the best episodes of the series; it totally assumes the collective psychology of its main subjects."

Alec Bojalad of Den of Geek gave the episode a 4.5 star rating out of 5 and wrote, "I thought I was sick of cliffhangers, I thought they were tired. It turns out I just hadn't been bashed in the face with them until I could barely breathe enough. Thanks Mr. Robot?" Caralynn Lippo of TV Fanatic gave the episode a 4.75 star rating out of 5 and wrote, "I definitely preferred the later, tension-filled half of 'Hidden Process', though there was no lack of great moments in the earlier half, which functioned mostly to set things up for the eventual madness of that final scene."
