= Eps3.3 metadata.par2 =

"eps3.3_metadata.par2"
- Mr. Robot episode
- Episode no.: Season 3 Episode 4
- Directed by: Sam Esmail
- Written by: Kyle Bradstreet
- Cinematography by: Tod Campbell
- Editing by: John Petaja
- Original release date: November 1, 2017
- Running time: 46 minutes

Guest appearances
- Rizwan Manji as Norm Gill; Ramy Youssef as Samar Swailem; Chloë Levine as Erica

Episode chronology
| ← Previous "eps3.2 legacy.so" | Next → "eps3.4_runtime-error.r00" |

"eps3.3_metadata.par2" is the fourth episode of the third season of the American drama thriller television series Mr. Robot. It is the 26th overall episode of the series and was written by executive producer Kyle Bradstreet and directed by series creator Sam Esmail. It originally aired on USA Network on November 1, 2017.

The series follows Elliot Alderson, a cybersecurity engineer and hacker with social anxiety disorder, who is recruited by an insurrectionary anarchist known as "Mr. Robot" to join a group of hacktivists called "fsociety". In the episode, Elliot and Darlene try to amend their relationship, while Angela must take matters in her own hands when Elliot continues intervening.

According to Nielsen Media Research, the episode was seen by an estimated 0.552 million household viewers and gained a 0.2 ratings share among adults aged 18–49. The episode received generally positive reviews from critics, who praised the character development.

== Plot ==
Elliot (Rami Malek) breaks into the safe house, but Darlene (Carly Chaikin) is nowhere to be found. Dominique (Grace Gummer) alerts Darlene as she arrives at the safe house, warning her not to blow her cover. Inside, Elliot questions her about her behavior, telling her he knows about the bugged computer.

Elliot and Darlene go to his apartment, which he trashed to check for more bugs. He admits that Stage 2 was never called off and suspects Mr. Robot (Christian Slater) continues working on the project while he sleeps. To keep guard, Darlene agrees to stay next door, in Shayla's empty apartment. Meanwhile, the FBI arrests a man who posted a fsociety video, with Dominique believing that the man actually works for the Dark Army when she mentions Whiterose. Her partner, Norm (Rizwan Manji), believes Whiterose to be just a myth.

At night, Darlene sees Elliot, as Mr. Robot, leaving his apartment. She follows him and finds him meeting with Angela (Portia Doubleday) but loses them when they get into a taxi. Mr. Robot and Angela get to the warehouse, where an irate Tyrell (Martin Wallström) is waiting. Upon being informed that Elliot was rerouting the records, Tyrell angrily questions the plan, stating he shouldn't have trusted Elliot. Mr. Robot confronts Tyrell, until he starts losing perception of reality. As Angela tries to calm him, he reverts back to Elliot, confused over what he is doing. Angela is then forced to inject him with a tranquilizer, and assures Tyrell that she can help in getting the records within three days.

During a meeting with Irving (Bobby Cannavale), Tyrell shares his frustrations about Stage 2. After being motivated, Tyrell states he will move to Ukraine with his family once he is done, and asks Irving to check on Joanna. Angela calls Price (Michael Cristofer), getting him to fire Elliot from E Corp to prevent him from derailing Stage 2. Darlene leaves her apartment, planning to follow a lead without wearing a wire, despite Dominique's concerns.

== Production ==
=== Development ===
The episode was written by executive producer Kyle Bradstreet and directed by series creator Sam Esmail. This was Bradstreet's fourth writing credit, and Esmail's 19th directing credit.

== Reception ==
=== Viewers ===
In its original American broadcast, "eps3.3_metadata.par2" was seen by an estimated 0.552 million household viewers with a 0.2 in the 18-49 demographics. This means that 0.2 percent of all households with televisions watched the episode. This was a slight increase in viewership from the previous episode, which was watched by an estimated 0.542 million household viewers with a 0.2 in the 18-49 demographics.

=== Critical reviews ===
"eps3.3_metadata.par2" received generally positive reviews from critics. The review aggregator website Rotten Tomatoes reported a 94% approval rating for the episode, based on 11 reviews. The site's consensus states: "Perhaps a bit unmemorable as a singular episode, 'Eps3.3_metadata.par2' nevertheless executes off the show's slower, more straightforward pace."

Alex McLevy of The A.V. Club gave the episode a "B–" grade and wrote, "There's a lot of table setting in 'm3tadata.par2,' but the dominant emotional tone that runs through it is one of pain. Tyrell Wellick again proves that his temper is likely to be his undoing one of these days."

Alan Sepinwall of Uproxx wrote, "It's a piece-mover episode, designed to advance various stories and character arcs incrementally, while saving the next batch of major fireworks in both areas for a later hour. It's a useful bit of glue holding the season together, and the sort seemingly designed with eventual binge-viewing in mind, but not enormously memorable on its own." Kyle Fowle of Entertainment Weekly wrote, "So far, season three of Mr. Robot has been a fair amount of setup, barring a murder or two. Depending on your tastes, you're either loving the focus on atmosphere and the more clear-eyed plot, or you're waiting for more things to happen, itching for a little more action. I, for one, could live in this tech-noir atmosphere that Esmail has created. It's intoxicating."

Jeremy Egner of The New York Times wrote, "So what story is hidden within Darlene's analog photo, or at least in its surpassing meaningfulness to her? That the only thing that Darlene cares about is her memory of a time when her family was intact, at least, and perhaps even happy. A time before her father's death or Elliot’s mental break, before cellphone photos or cataclysmic hacks." Vikram Murthi of Vulture gave the episode a 3 star rating out of 5 and wrote, "'Eps3.3_metadata.par2' sets the table for the next few episodes, as Whiterose imposes a timetable on Stage 2, forcing Angela and Tyrell to scramble while trying to keep tabs on Elliot/Mr. Robot. Still, it's a mild cut above because credited writer Kyle Bradstreet takes the time to examine the regret and fear that have taken hold of the Alderson siblings." Alec Bojalad of Den of Geek gave the episode a 3 star rating out of 5 and wrote, "In trying to fix the pace, Mr. Robot has lost some of that fever-dream aesthetic and mystique. Surely a grand compromise of pace, plot, and pathos is coming soon. Until then we'll just have to enjoy the company. And the Red Wheelbarrow ribs. They do look delicious."
