= Eps2.7 init 5.fve =

"eps2.7_init_5.fve"
- Mr. Robot episode
- Episode no.: Season 2 Episode 9
- Directed by: Sam Esmail
- Written by: Kyle Bradstreet; Lucy Teitler
- Cinematography by: Tod Campbell
- Editing by: Philip Harrison
- Original release date: August 31, 2016
- Running time: 49 minutes

Guest appearances
- Michael Drayer as Francis "Cisco" Shaw; Joey Badass as Leon; BD Wong as Whiterose; Armand Schultz as Michael Hansen; Vaishnavi Sharma as Magda Alderson; Michael Maize as "Lone Star" Lockwood; Jeremy Holm as Donald "Mr. Sutherland" Hoffman; Caroline Strong as Deputy Director Phelps; Craig Robinson as Ray Heyworth

Episode chronology
← Previous "eps2.6 succ3ss0r.p12"	Next → "eps2.8 h1dden-pr0cess.axx"

"eps2.7_init_5.fve" is the ninth episode of the second season of the American drama thriller television series Mr. Robot. It is the nineteenth overall episode of the series and was written by Kyle Bradstreet and Lucy Teitler, and directed by series creator Sam Esmail. It originally aired on USA Network on August 31, 2016.

The series follows Elliot Alderson, a cybersecurity engineer and hacker with social anxiety disorder, who is recruited by an insurrectionary anarchist known as "Mr. Robot" to join a group of hacktivists called "fsociety". In the episode, Elliot's past in prison is explored, while Angela finds more about the toxic waste leak.

According to Nielsen Media Research, the episode was seen by an estimated 0.651 million household viewers and gained a 0.3 ratings share among adults aged 18–49. The episode received extremely positive reviews from critics, praising the performances, writing and tension.

== Plot ==
In the aftermath of the 5/9 hacking attack, Elliot (Rami Malek) hears someone knocking at his apartment's door. It is revealed to be a police force, arresting him for stealing Lenny's dog as well as hacking him. Even though his lawyer gets him a reduced sentence if he declares himself not guilty, Elliot pleads guilty instead, infuriating Mr. Robot (Christian Slater). He is sentenced to 18 months in the county jail.

Elliot is introduced to Leon (Joey Badass), an inmate, and also runs into the warden, Ray (Craig Robinson). After 86 days, he is released, as the hack has damaged the prison's economy and they want to get rid of non-violent inmates. He is picked up by Darlene (Carly Chaikin), who informs him that Trenton and Mobley have gone missing and that the Dark Army may be plotting against them. Before moving forward with a new plan, Elliot visits his mother, Magda (Vaishnavi Sharma), at a nursing home to thank her for helping him through his time in prison.

Angela (Portia Doubleday) hacks E Corp herself, and discovers that the toxic waste leak at the Washington Township plant wasn't fixed. She delivers evidence of this to the Nuclear Regulatory Commission, although she is pressured into acting as a whistleblower as she works for E Corp. She is later visited by Dominique (Grace Gummer), who pressures her in cooperating as they have been following her and evidence won't be favorable for her. Whiterose (BD Wong), as Zhang, meets with Price (Michael Cristofer) to discuss the latter's failed bailout plan. Price convinces Whiterose to help him by taking care of the plant, although it is revealed that Whiterose was involved in the deaths of Price's predecessors.

Elliot and Darlene take shelter with Cisco (Michael Drayer), who claims he was actually protecting them from the Dark Army. Elliot convinces Cisco to arrange a meeting with the Dark Army in order to find about the Stage 2, claiming that Mr. Robot will be part of it. However, Darlene realizes that she left an fsociety tape showing her face at Susan's house, forcing Cisco to leave and retrieve it. Despite the possibility that his apartment is bugged, Elliot decides to leave, as he finds he is disconnecting from Mr. Robot. Darlene hacks into Cisco's contact, hearing the Dark Army say Stage 2 is Elliot's plan before someone knocks at the house's door. Elliot returns home, where he discovers Joanna (Stephanie Corneliussen) waiting for him outside.

== Production ==
=== Development ===
In August 2016, USA Network announced that the ninth episode of the season would be titled "eps2.7_init_5.fve". The episode was written by Kyle Bradstreet and Lucy Teitler, and directed by series creator Sam Esmail. This was Bradstreet's third writing credit, Teitler's first writing credit, and Esmail's twelfth directing credit.

== Reception ==
=== Viewers ===
In its original American broadcast, "eps2.7_init_5.fve" was seen by an estimated 0.651 million household viewers with a 0.3 in the 18-49 demographics. This means that 0.3 percent of all households with televisions watched the episode. This was a 13% decrease in viewership from the previous episode, which was watched by an estimated 0.742 million household viewers with a 0.3 in the 18-49 demographics.

=== Critical reviews ===
"eps2.7_init_5.fve" received extremely positive reviews from critics. The review aggregator website Rotten Tomatoes reported an 89% approval rating for the episode, based on 18 reviews. The site's consensus states: "Brimming with suspense and ripe with intrigue, 'Init_5' answers lingering questions only to raise others as the season approaches what's sure to be a compelling final act."

Matt Fowler of IGN wrote, "Mr. Robot is purposefully keeping something huge from Elliot. It felt like this season was trying to bring them closer together, so that they could co-exist, but this latest splinter turns Mr. Robot, Elliot himself, into his own antagonist (and, conversely, the reason he was being protected in prison). Whiterose is the facilitator, but not the architect."

Alex McLevy of The A.V. Club gave the episode a "B" grade and wrote, "It was good to have Elliot back in the fold this week, though 'init_5.fve' was weakened by a surfeit of soap opera cliffhangers. Having someone open a door and then making the audience wait a week to see who it is works when it's part of a larger purpose, an intentional disorientation of time and identity that fits into the larger narrative of the show. Having both Cisco and Darlene end this week on 'What'd they see?' teasers felt like overkill, the show succumbing just a hair to the 'tune in next week!' trolling of which critics often accuse it. Normally with Mr. Robot, it's a clever ploy to undermine those very conventions. Unless something very smart happens in the next episode to justify those delays, this was a bit clumsy, an indulgence rather than a necessity." Jeff Jensen of Entertainment Weekly wrote, "'init_5.fve' captured Elliot's discombobulating and fatiguing first day out of the slammer. It also put him on a familiar path that could send him back to jail if he isn't careful. He experienced disintegration."

Jay Bushman of IndieWire gave the episode a "B+" grade and wrote, "Elliot forces a meeting with Dark Army contact Xun, who we last saw breaking a needle off in Cisco's finger. But the hack of Xun's phone leads to a shocking reveal from Whiterose — Stage 2 is Elliot's plan. But Elliot doesn't know what it is, nor does it seem Mr. Robot does either. What are the odds that there's a third persona somewhere inside his mind?" Vikram Murthi of Vulture gave the episode a 4 star rating out of 5 and wrote, "After last week's tense powerhouse of an episode, it would be understandable if 'eps2.7_init_5.fve' slowed down the pace or eased up on the tension. Instead, it pretty much maintains a steady boil as Elliot, Darlene, and Cisco contend with growing fallout while Angela tries to blow the whistle on E Corp's toxic-waste leaks. The episode is largely a success because credited writers Kyle Bradstreet and Lucy Teitler pare down the focus, which allows the narrative to keep moving at an eager clip. It moves so fast, it'd actually be easy to miss key information, especially regarding Phillip Price's complicated deal with Whiterose."

Alec Bojalad of Den of Geek gave the episode a 3 star rating out of 5 and wrote, "The longer Tyrell stays offscreen, the larger the boogeyman grows. This season of Mr. Robot is similar in that aspect. The longer it goes the bigger and better it gets, even while the individual episodes stagnate." Caralynn Lippo of TV Fanatic gave the episode a 4.75 star rating out of 5 and wrote, "As the season hits its home stretch, this episode marks what is sure to be a pivotal installment of the series – and one of the best yet. "Init 5" was deliciously tense and a welcome return to Elliot after the Elliot-less (but still wonderful) 'Successor'."
