= Eps2.5 h4ndshake.sme =

"eps2.5_h4ndshake.sme"
- Mr. Robot episode
- Episode no.: Season 2 Episode 7
- Directed by: Sam Esmail
- Written by: Sam Esmail
- Cinematography by: Tod Campbell
- Editing by: John Petaja
- Original release date: August 17, 2016
- Running time: 49 minutes

Guest appearances
- Gloria Reuben as Dr. Krista Gordon; Azhar Khan as Sunil "Mobley" Markesh; Sunita Mani as Shama "Trenton" Biswas; Michael Drayer as Francis "Cisco" Shaw; Brian Stokes Mitchell as Scott Knowles; Michele Hicks as Sharon Knowles; Joey Badass as Leon; Jeremy Bobb as Joseph Green; Chris Conroy as Derek; Michael Maize as "Lone Star" Lockwood; Don Sparks as Donald Moss; Craig Robinson as Ray Heyworth

Episode chronology
← Previous "eps2.4 m4ster-s1ave.aes"	Next → "eps2.6 succ3ss0r.p12"

"eps2.5_h4ndshake.sme" is the seventh episode of the second season of the American drama thriller television series Mr. Robot. It is the seventeenth overall episode of the series and was written and directed by series creator Sam Esmail. It originally aired on USA Network on August 17, 2016.

The series follows Elliot Alderson, a cybersecurity engineer and hacker with social anxiety disorder, who is recruited by an insurrectionary anarchist known as "Mr. Robot" to join a group of hacktivists called "fsociety". In the episode, Elliot is forced to return Ray's website back to normal, while Angela gets an offer.

According to Nielsen Media Research, the episode was seen by an estimated 0.652 million household viewers and gained a 0.3 ratings share among adults aged 18–49. The episode received extremely positive reviews from critics, who praised the twist ending, although some felt that the twist was predictable.

== Plot ==
Still in the locked room, Elliot (Rami Malek) is questioned by Mr. Robot (Christian Slater) over the events leading up to his disappearance, trying to find where he went after the events at the arcade. Their conversation culminates with Elliot accepting that he might have killed Tyrell (Martin Wallström).

Dominique (Grace Gummer) questions Angela (Portia Doubleday) over entering a restricted area. She makes it clear she is curious about Angela, given her lawsuit and working for E Corp regardless. After Dominique leaves, Angela finishes the hack. Talking with Darlene (Carly Chaikin), she concludes that she and Elliot came up with the fsociety masks based on a movie they watched many years ago. During a hearing where the United States Congress will decide on Price's bailout vote, fsociety interrupts the event by throwing a part of the Charging Bull. Derek (Chris Conroy) decides to end his relationship with Joanna (Stephanie Corneliussen) when she doesn't show up for his birthday party. However, she surprises him by giving him her divorce papers from Tyrell Wellick, claiming she wants to be with him.

Elliot is brought before Ray (Craig Robinson), who wants him to fix his website. After putting the website back online, Elliot decides to play chess with Ray. Ray talks about his past and wife's role in the website, before recognizing that Elliot informed the FBI about Ray when he used the website. Ray accepts his fate and allows himself to get arrested, not incriminating Elliot in his operation. As Elliot apologizes to many people in his life, Mr. Robot reminds him that he must become a leader. Elliot is almost raped by a gang for causing the website's demise, only to be saved by Leon (Joey Badass). Leon reveals that he works for the Dark Army, and that he will soon receive a letter with instructions.

Angela settles the E Corp v Washington Township lawsuit, and through Price (Michael Cristofer), she is reassigned to the Risk Management division. She oversteps boundaries at her first director's meeting, and she is warned that she is only in the position because of a favor to Price. Elliot has another session with Krista (Gloria Reuben), who notes progress in his life. Elliot acknowledges his relationship with Mr. Robot, while also recognizing he was never living with his mother. Suddenly, the session is revealed to be a fantasy, and that Elliot is actually in prison. Elliot apologizes to the viewer for misleading, but promises to be honest moving forward.

== Production ==
=== Development ===
In August 2016, USA Network announced that the seventh episode of the season would be titled "eps2.5_h4ndshake.sme". The episode was written and directed by series creator Sam Esmail. This was Esmail's tenth writing credit, and tenth directing credit.

== Reception ==
=== Viewers ===
In its original American broadcast, "eps2.5_h4ndshake.sme" was seen by an estimated 0.652 million household viewers with a 0.3 in the 18-49 demographics. This means that 0.3 percent of all households with televisions watched the episode. This was a 13% increase in viewership from the previous episode, which was watched by an estimated 0.572 million household viewers with a 0.2 in the 18-49 demographics.

=== Critical reviews ===
"eps2.5_h4ndshake.sme" received extremely positive reviews from critics. The review aggregator website Rotten Tomatoes reported an 84% approval rating for the episode, based on 19 reviews. The site's consensus states: "The final moments of 'h4ndshake.sme' make a significant reveal, yet it's the carefully drawn characters and their allegorical relations that continue to be the most important constant in the show."

Matt Fowler of IGN wrote, "I'm looking forward, in the next few weeks, for more light to be shed on Elliot's half-season story. Season 2, with Elliot off to the side and some notably longer and self-indulgent episodes, hasn't quite reached the heights we were hoping for heading in. Now though, we've got a "handshake" between Elliot and Mr. Robot - and one between Elliot and us viewers as well - indicating that he's ready to take the reins on the 5/9 aftercare."

Alex McLevy of The A.V. Club gave the episode an "A" grade and wrote, "What makes 'h4ndshake.sme' such a beautiful episode of Mr. Robot isn't the big reveals, or the profound allegorical relations between characters, or even the virtuoso use of music this week. It was the return of Elliot's relationship with us, the unseen, unnamed passenger in this story. We have a role to play, but when Elliot lost his faith in us, it shook our connection to him. It threw cold water on that ineffable trust that bound us to him, and made us even more uncertain than we already were about what was happening onscreen."

Alan Sepinwall of Uproxx wrote, "So, as Redditors and other fans have been theorizing since the season 2 premiere, Elliot wasn't staying with his mother in Jersey, but has been locked up in prison. The basketball court was the rec yard, the diner where he and Leon discussed Seinfeld was the cafeteria, his 'mother' was actually a stern female guard, etc. More is still to come about why Elliot was locked up, the exact nature of Ray's position in the prison and his business, etc., but the broad strokes are all consistent with the big fan theory." Kyle Fowle of Entertainment Weekly wrote, "Look, there's no way to dance around this. After weeks of mystery and ambiguity, Mr. Robot has finally pulled the trigger on a big reveal, and from the looks of it, the fan theories were wrong but not too far off. Some have posited that Elliot has been spending this season in a psychiatric hospital, but as it turns out, he's been in prison. It's all explained in tonight's final shots and it changes everything that came before. Well, it might not change the plot, but it changes our understanding of every single Elliot scene this season."

Jay Bushman of IndieWire gave the episode a "C+" grade and wrote, "Last year, it was the hammer blow that Darlene was Elliot's sister; now we learn that Leon is actually working for Whiterose and the Dark Army. But the surprises are not nearly as effective this time around. On the bright side, this episode brings a sense of relief — having Elliot off by himself for the first half of the season has dulled the forward momentum of the storytelling, and while it continues to use pyrotechnics to distract from that, that strategy is wearing thin." Genevieve Koski of Vulture gave the episode a 4 star rating out of 5 and wrote, "The final, slightly off-center shot of Elliot staring vacuously into the camera and asking if he and the audience can 'shake' on a new trust is entirely Esmail, and that still means something. Like Elliot, Esmail has too much courage, which can lead to errors in judgment. But, by God, the courage is something to watch."

Alec Bojalad of Den of Geek gave the episode a 4.5 star rating out of 5 and wrote, "'Handshake' is the first episode of Mr. Robot to force me to step back and take stock of the 'villains' presented thus far. And upon examination, they're more varied and fascinating that I had realized. Mr. Robot exists in a morally gray universe. This does not make it unique amongst television shows or even reality itself. What's interesting, however, is every character's dogged belief that they, themselves are heroes... despite all evidence to the contrary." Caralynn Lippo of TV Fanatic gave the episode a 4.25 star rating out of 5 and wrote, "I can't say that I'm surprised by the twist revealed in the closing moments of [the episode]. There have been many hints towards that end all season. That said, I do think that the twist was revealed perfectly – once again proving that it's the execution, not the twist itself, which keeps us all tuned in to this series."
