= Eps3.0 power-saver-mode.h =

"eps3.0_power-saver-mode.h"
- Mr. Robot episode
- Episode no.: Season 3 Episode 1
- Directed by: Sam Esmail
- Written by: Sam Esmail
- Cinematography by: Tod Campbell
- Editing by: John Petaja
- Original release date: October 11, 2017
- Running time: 53 minutes

Guest appearances
- Josh Mostel as Bo; Erik Jensen as Frank Cody; Grant Chang as Grant

Episode chronology
| ← Previous "eps2.9 pyth0n-pt2.p7z" | Next → "eps3.1 undo.gz" |

"eps3.0_power-saver-mode.h" is the first episode of the third season of the American drama thriller television series Mr. Robot. It is the 23rd overall episode of the series and was written and directed by series creator Sam Esmail. It originally aired on USA Network on October 11, 2017.

The series follows Elliot Alderson, a cybersecurity engineer and hacker with social anxiety disorder, who is recruited by an insurrectionary anarchist known as "Mr. Robot" to join a group of hacktivists called "fsociety". In the episode, Elliot tries to stop Stage 2 from moving forward.

According to Nielsen Media Research, the episode was seen by an estimated 0.681 million household viewers and gained a 0.3 ratings share among adults aged 18–49. The episode received extremely positive reviews from critics, who deemed it as a promising start for the season.

== Plot ==
A car salesman named Irving (Bobby Cannavale) argues with a cashier at a restaurant, when he receives a call. The person is in severe trouble and Irving states he will arrive shortly. He gets to the Dark Army building, revealing that the caller was Tyrell (Martin Wallström), panicked that Elliot (Rami Malek) could die from his wounds. After checking on Elliot, he tells Tyrell that he will get doctors to help him. At a power plant, Zhang (BD Wong) states that Elliot will die once his duties end for the Dark Army.

A week later, Elliot wakes up in a room, with Angela (Portia Doubleday) alongside him. Realizing that she spoke with Tyrell, proving the encounter was real, Elliot tries to leave in order to stop the attack. He goes back to the building, only to find it empty. He goes to his apartment, finding Darlene (Carly Chaikin) waiting for him. When Darlene demands to know about Stage 2, Elliot reveals the plan. As the city is suffering a blackout, Darlene takes Elliot to an underground hacker tournament with fiber connections in order to close the backdoor on E Corp. However, they are approached by Dark Army agents, forcing them to travel in a car with Irving.

Irving gets Elliot to hack into the Dark Army agents' car database, allowing them to flee from the car. When Elliot fights back over Stage 2, Irving states he will call it off if he is not content. After Irving leaves them at a restaurant, Elliot and Darlene argue over the plan, with Elliot claiming Tyrell was not involved. As Elliot walks on the streets, he comes to realize that his actions in preventing the hack could actually make things worse for the world. He visits Angela, asking her to get him a job at E Corp.

At night, Angela talks with Mr. Robot (Christian Slater), with whom she has been collaborating in order to make sure Stage 2 goes forward. She takes him to meet Irving and Tyrell at a hideout, with Mr. Robot intending to work on Stage 2 despite Elliot closing the backdoor, but not planning to get Darlene involved as she helped Elliot with the backdoor. Mr. Robot instructs Angela to manipulate Elliot, both of them believing in the concept of a new world once E Corp is taken down. As Angela and Mr. Robot leave on a bus, electricity comes back to the city.

== Production ==
=== Development ===
The episode was written and directed by series creator Sam Esmail. This was Esmail's thirteenth writing credit, and sixteenth directing credit.

== Reception ==
=== Viewers ===
In its original American broadcast, "eps3.0_power-saver-mode.h" was seen by an estimated 0.681 million household viewers with a 0.3 in the 18-49 demographics. This means that 0.3 percent of all households with televisions watched the episode. This was a 21% decrease in viewership from the previous episode, which was watched by an estimated 0.852 million household viewers with a 0.4 in the 18-49 demographics.

=== Critical reviews ===
"eps3.0_power-saver-mode.h" received extremely positive reviews from critics. The review aggregator website Rotten Tomatoes reported an 100% approval rating for the episode, based on 16 reviews. The site's consensus states: "The season premiere continues to tie Mr. Robot to the American zeitgeist, offering a visually-stunning introduction to the new darkness ahead."

Alex McLevy of The A.V. Club gave the episode a "B–" grade and wrote, "Mr. Robot's season-three premiere is a surprisingly morose and muted installment. 'Power-save-mode' may be a reference to Angela, but it fits the episode itself, the show turning away from tumbling any further down the rabbit hole, instead hitting pause on the intrigue and pulling back from the radical nature of its story. Like Elliot, it seems wary of going too far too fast, hedging its bets and sending its protagonist headlong into an explicitly counterrevolutionary stance."

Alan Sepinwall of Uproxx wrote, "We'll have to wait to find out what it all means, but this was a very promising start, from Irving's introduction to the way Daft Punk's 'Touch' carried us through the closing minutes." Kyle Fowle of Entertainment Weekly wrote, "Themes of control and perspective dominate 'Eps3.0power-saver-mode.h.' There's a reason why the blackout plays such an integral role in the premiere; this is an episode about power, be it electrical, financial, or mental."

Liz Shannon Miller of IndieWire gave the episode a "B+" grade and wrote, "it's a promising start to a new season, and the surprises lying in wait have us excited. We no longer wonder, per the Season 1 tagline, 'Who is Mr. Robot?' But we also never really know for sure, and that's what keeps us hypnotized." Vikram Murthi of Vulture gave the episode a 4 star rating out of 5 and wrote, "In short, this is a promising premiere that suggests a steadier, more absorbing season going forward. I've been burned before, but ironically enough, I'm somewhat convinced that Mr. Robot needed to travel up its own ass so it could gloriously tunnel its way out."

Alec Bojalad of Den of Geek gave the episode a 4.5 star rating out of 5 and wrote, "It can be hard to glean just exactly what Mr. Robot is about. Now, thanks to an unusually confessional and open premiere it's clear that at its core the show is really just one of the only three stories you can tell: Elliot against himself. Only in this case. Elliot is against himself and... his other self." Caralynn Lippo of TV Fanatic gave the episode a 4.75 star rating out of 5 and wrote, "Overall, this was an extremely strong season opener and set up the upcoming season brilliantly."
