= Eps2.4 m4ster-s1ave.aes =

"eps2.4_m4ster-s1ave.aes"
- Mr. Robot episode
- Episode no.: Season 2 Episode 6
- Directed by: Sam Esmail
- Written by: Adam Penn
- Cinematography by: Tod Campbell
- Editing by: Philip Harrison
- Original release date: August 10, 2016
- Running time: 50 minutes

Guest appearances
- Michel Gill as Gideon Goddard; Azhar Khan as Sunil "Mobley" Markesh; Sunita Mani as Shama "Trenton" Biswas; Michael Drayer as Francis "Cisco" Shaw; Omar Metwally as Ernesto Santiago; Erik Jensen as Frank Cody; Vaishnavi Sharma as Magda Alderson; Michael Maize as "Lone Star" Lockwood; Tom Degnan as Ross Thomas; Paul Fusco as ALF; Craig Robinson as Ray Heyworth

Episode chronology
← Previous "eps2.3 logic-b0mb.hc"	Next → "eps2.5 h4ndshake.sme"

"eps2.4_m4ster-s1ave.aes" is the sixth episode of the second season of the American drama thriller television series Mr. Robot. It is the sixteenth overall episode of the series and was written by co-producer Adam Penn and directed by series creator Sam Esmail. It originally aired on USA Network on August 10, 2016.

The series follows Elliot Alderson, a cybersecurity engineer and hacker with social anxiety disorder, who is recruited by an insurrectionary anarchist known as "Mr. Robot" to join a group of hacktivists called "fsociety". In the episode, Elliot experiences a new dream scenario, while Angela prepares to aid Darlene in the FBI hack.

According to Nielsen Media Research, the episode was seen by an estimated 0.572 million household viewers and gained a 0.2 ratings share among adults aged 18–49. The episode received extremely positive reviews from critics, praising the opening sitcom section of the episode, although some criticized the pacing and lack of progress.

== Plot ==
Elliot (Rami Malek) finds himself part of a 1990s family sitcom, where Edward (Christian Slater) is taking him, Darlene (Carly Chaikin) and Magda (Vaishnavi Sharma) on a road trip. Elliot is confused, as he can hear a laugh track and a person trapped in the car's trunk.

Arriving at a gas station, Magda knocks Darlene unconscious when she complains and Elliot finds that Tyrell (Martin Wallström) is the man locked in the trunk. He enters the gas station, running into ALF and meeting Angela (Portia Doubleday), who works as the manager. As they talk, Magda pepper-sprays Angela and she and Edward rob the store before fleeing. When the car gets a flat tire, Elliot demands to know what is happening, but the conversation is interrupted when an officer, Gideon (Michel Gill), arrives. Before he can investigate any further, he is killed when ALF drives over him in a hit and run. While driving, Tyrell escapes from the trunk but crashes with the sitcom's background, after which he is killed by Edward. As Elliot continues questioning, Edward tells him to keep his eyes on the road. He then takes Elliot to a hospital.

Back in reality, Elliot wakes up in a hospital, with Ray (Craig Robinson) by his side. Ray makes it clear that he is Elliot's master and warns him to maintain their partnership. Having survived, Dominique wants to investigate the shooting, as the killers committed suicide, but her boss downplays the shooters as Uyghur separatists. Price (Michael Cristofer) is also notified that the United States Congress has rejected his bailout plan to borrow from China, as four FBI agents died in the shooting.

Angela is introduced to hacking by Mobley (Azhar Khan), even if the recent FBI shooting in Beijing will complicate the mission. Cisco (Michael Drayer) provides them with equipment from the Dark Army, although he had his hypodermic needle removed for asking too many questions. Angela gains access to the network at her office, and calls Mobley and Darlene when the network script is not working. She evades an agent’s suspicion and tries to complete the hack from her cubicle, but Dominique appears before she can finish.

Elliot is kidnapped by Lone Star (Michael Maize), who places him on a room. There, Mr. Robot consoles Elliot, claiming he only wanted to help him. In a flashback, Edward converses with a young Elliot, telling him that he got fired for getting sick, asking him to keep this from his mother and sister. He then shows him a new computer store he is opening, and asks him to choose a name. As they pull up in front of the store, Edward tells him to think of the first thing he can come up with.

== Production ==
=== Development ===
In August 2016, USA Network announced that the sixth episode of the season would be titled "eps2.4_m4ster-s1ave.aes". The episode was written by co-producer Adam Penn and directed by series creator Sam Esmail. This was Penn's second writing credit, and Esmail's ninth directing credit.

=== Writing ===
For the opening sequence, Sam Esmail explained, "I remember being envious of the families on those sitcoms because even if they had their minor conflict every week, they always resolved it. Everyone always loved each other. Life was a lot simpler. Every house looked totally nice, and you had everything you needed. So Elliot goes to that place."

== Reception ==
=== Viewers ===
In its original American broadcast, "eps2.4_m4ster-s1ave.aes" was seen by an estimated 0.572 million household viewers with a 0.2 in the 18-49 demographics. This means that 0.2 percent of all households with televisions watched the episode. This was a 19% decrease in viewership from the previous episode, which was watched by an estimated 0.705 million household viewers with a 0.2 in the 18-49 demographics.

=== Critical reviews ===
"eps2.4_m4ster-s1ave.aes" received extremely positive reviews from critics. The review aggregator website Rotten Tomatoes reported a 90% approval rating for the episode, based on 20 reviews. The site's consensus states: "'eps2.4_m4ster-s1ave.aes' provides one of the most audacious and creative openings in the series to date before taking a thrilling and touching dramatic turn in the episode's second half."

Matt Fowler of IGN gave the episode a "great" 8.2 out of 10 and wrote in his verdict, "I certainly enjoy the hell out of most parts of Mr. Robot, though I'm currently waiting for this season to feel like more than a collection of unique puzzle pieces. The trippy, demented journey into cheesy Full House-style comedies was fun, but I find myself now looking for those substance-over-style moments. Which is why I enjoyed the flashback ending so much. And even the moment when Elliot tearily hugged the Mr. Robot part of himself. Moments of realness within the 'world gone insane' (as the sitcom theme music proclaimed)."

Alex McLevy of The A.V. Club gave the episode a "B+" grade and wrote, "Yes, the company fired Robot, blaming his absences from the days he visited the doctor. And yes, we again see that Robot's commitment to his son was always there, assuring him, 'I'm never gonna leave you, Promise.' But this sequence was more nostalgic than revelatory, filling in the strokes of what we already know rather than pushing them forward, or unlocking new character beats. It may play a more important role in the coming weeks than is apparent now. But at the moment, Mr. Robot is taking a moment to reflect on what's come before, prior to plunging us back down the rabbit hole."

Alan Sepinwall of HitFix wrote, "This was a fun one, folks – as fun as Mr. Robot can probably be, given its baseline tone – though one that still could have benefited from some tightening." Jeff Jensen of Entertainment Weekly wrote, "Last week's episode of Mr. Robot teasingly floated the possibility of an impending leap into an alternate reality. But not even Whiterose, with all her powers of contemplation, could have imagined an act of transcendence and a world as bizarro as the sitcom version of Mr. Robot."

Jay Bushman of IndieWire gave the episode an "A" grade and wrote, "One of the great things about Mr. Robot is that each week, it might be a completely different show. It's never been afraid to mix genres, styles and tones in its depiction of Elliot's fractured mindset, but the audacious opening twenty minutes of this week's installment sets a new level of craziness, as Elliot finds himself in an late-eighties/early-nineties sitcom." Genevieve Koski of Vulture gave the episode a 3 star rating out of 5 and wrote, "'eps2.4_m4ster-s1ave.aes' showcases Mr. Robot at its worst and at its best. The series frequently frustrates with its lack of subtlety and its oft-excessive stylistic tics, but it's still commendable that it tries. The best thing about it is its confidence, even when things threaten to go off the rails, and this episode demonstrates the pros and cons of that approach. Mr. Robot seeks not just to walk to the beat of its own drum, but to create the drum from scratch. There's no better proof than this episode, which fails and succeeds just minutes apart."

Alec Bojalad of Den of Geek gave the episode a 4 star rating out of 5 and wrote, "The non-Elliot stuff in 'Master/Slave' is among the least consequential material that season two of Mr. Robot has presented us with so far. Still, I'd consider it yet another very good yet not great entry in a season full of them. I don't have many rules of TV criticism but one of them has to be that when a gritty hacker drama includes an Alf cameo, you stand up and cheer, damn it." Caralynn Lippo of TV Fanatic gave the episode a 4.75 star rating out of 5 and wrote, "There are some hours of television that I immediately recognize that I (and everyone else watching) will either love or hate. There is no in between. The episode is one of those hours – well, hour and ten minutes, technically – and I absolutely, unabashedly loved it."
