= Marcus Graham (disambiguation) =

Marcus Graham (born 1963) is an Australian actor.

Marcus Graham may also refer to:

- Marcus Graham (anarchist) (1893–1985), Canadian anarchist
- Marcus Graham (entomologist) (1915–1995), English entomologist
- Marcus Graham (shoutcaster), American shoutcaster and Twitch employee
