= Marcus Graham (anarchist) =

Marcus Graham (1893, Dorohoi, Romania – December 1985, Manchester, New Hampshire) was an anarchist active in the United States from the 1910s to his death in the 1980s. Graham was born in Canada. "Marcus Graham" was a pseudonym for "Shmuel Marcus."

== Newspapers ==
Graham was the editor of several anarchist publications including MAN!, The Anarchist Soviet Bulletin, Free Society (name was changed from The Anarchist Soviet Bulletin), and The Road To Freedom. Graham is also believed to have been the publisher of the Ellis Island Weekly a hand-written anarchist newspaper published by anarchists held on Ellis Island.

In particular, MAN! was an important anarchist newspaper in the United States during the 1930s. MAN! While advocating no specific anarchist program, was a successor of the tradition of Italian insurrectionist anarchism. It had direct links to that school of thought, with it growing out of the dissolution of an Italian anarchist newspaper. Over the span of its publication, MAN! had an “expansive” international circulation. In addition, chapters formed across the United States associated with the “International Group” that published MAN!.

MAN! Published commentary and analysis of world events of interest to anarchists such as the Spanish Civil War and published biographical sketches of largely forgotten anarchists such as Luigi Galleani, Robert Reitzel, Carl Nold, Kate Austin, and Chaim Weinberg.

Graham was also a prolific contributor to the anarchist press and his writings have appeared in the aforementioned newspapers in addition to War Commentary, Freedom, Resistance, Anarchy, Black Flag, and Match!.

== Books ==
Graham produced two anthologies during his life. An Anthology of Revolutionary Poetry (Active Press, 1929) and MAN!:An Anthology of Anarchist Ideas, Essays, Poetry and Commentaries (Cienfuegos Press, 1974). Graham contacted Scottish anarchist Stuart Christie to publish the MAN! anthology.

== Repression ==
Graham was the target of federal government repression from the 1910s into the 1930s. In the late 1910s, he was arrested and held for distributing The Anarchist Soviet Bulletin. Graham was held for six months while the government tried to determine his country of origin. The government threatened to deport him, but Russia, Mexico, and Canada all refused to accept him.

In the late 1920s, Graham was arrested again and threatened with deportation to Mexico where he had just visited to promote his Anthology of Revolutionary Poetry. Hearings were held in the case but it failed due to pressure from the literary community.

In the 1930s, Graham was again the target of repression. In 1936, Graham's home was raided as part of an attempt to suppress his newspaper MAN!. The government attempted to serve its 19-year-old deportation warrant but the charges did not hold. In 1940, a printer handed over proofs of MAN! to the federal government and its publication was suspended.

== Bibliography ==
- Cornell, Andrew (2011). 'For a World Without Oppressors:' U.S. Anarchism from the Palmer Raids to the Sixties (Ph.D.). New York University. ProQuest 861477368.
- Lazar, Hillary (2021). "Man! and the International Group: Anti-Radicalism, Immigrant Solidarity and Depression-Era Transnational Anarchism" (PDF). In Jacob, Frank; Keßler, Mario (eds.). Transatlantic Radicalism: Socialist and Anarchist Exchanges in the 19th and 20th Centuries. Liverpool University Press. pp. 109–126. ISBN 978-1-80085-960-9. JSTOR j.ctv1k5319k. Archived from the original on December 27, 2013.
