= Man! =

American anarchist periodical, 1933–1940

- First issue: 1933; 92 years ago
- Final issue: 1940; 85 years ago
- Based in: San Francisco
- OCLC: 3930443

Man! A Journal of the Anarchist Ideal and Movement was an anarchist periodical published in San Francisco from 1933 to 1940.

== Bibliography ==
- Cornell, Andrew (2016). Unruly Equality: U.S. Anarchism in the Twentieth Century. University of California Press. ISBN 978-0-520-28675-7. LCCN 2015022451.
- Guttmann, Allen (1974). "Man!". In Conlin, Joseph R. (ed.). The American Radical Press, 1880–1960. Westport, Connecticut: Greenwood Press. pp. 417–419. ISBN 0-8371-6625-X.
