= Insurrectionary anarchism =

Theory of anarchism

Insurrectionary anarchism is a revolutionary theory and tendency within the anarchist movement that emphasizes the importance of insurrection as a revolutionary practice. It is critical of formal organizations, such as labor unions and federations that are based on a political program and periodic congresses; instead, insurrectionary anarchists advocate for informal and small affinity group-based organization. Insurrectionary anarchists put value in attack, permanent class conflict and a refusal to negotiate or compromise with 'class enemies'.

Associated closely with the Italian anarchist movement, the theory of insurrectionary anarchism has historically been linked with a number of high-profile assassinations, as well as the bombing campaigns of the Galleanisti and Informal Anarchist Federation (FAI).

== History ==
=== Development ===
Among the earliest inspirations for insurrectionary anarchism was Max Stirner's 1845 book The Ego and Its Own, a tract that upheld a kind of proto-individualist anarchism. Stirner distinguished between "revolution" and "insurrection", defining the aims of "revolution" to be a new arrangement of society by a state, while he considered the aims of an "insurrection" to be the rejection of such arrangements and the free self-organisation of individuals.

During the 1870s, the idea of "propaganda of the deed" was initially developed by Italian anarchists to mean small direct actions that would inspire others to themselves carry out acts of insurrection. Insurrectionists viewed every riot or rebellion as a kind of "revolutionary gymnastics" which could lead to a generalised social revolution. Driven by this theory, Italian individualist anarchists carried out a series of high-profile assassinations during the 1890s, killing French President Sadi Carnot, Spanish Prime Minister Antonio Cánovas del Castillo, Austrian Empress Elisabeth Wittelsbach and Italian King Umberto Savoy.

Meanwhile, the question of organisation had divided the Italian anarchist movement into the syndicalists, who advocated for organisation within the labour movement, and the insurrectionists, who emphasised violent and illegal forms of self-organised direct action. The insurrectionary anarchists rejected all forms of formal organisation, including anarchist federations and trade unions, and criticised the movement's reformist and activist tendencies for failing to take "immediate action". Although both tendencies advocated for anarchist communism, pro-organisationalists such as Francesco Saverio Merlino and Errico Malatesta considered the insurrectionists to really constitute a tendency of individualist anarchism, due to their belief in individual sovereignty and natural law.

=== Galleanist movement ===
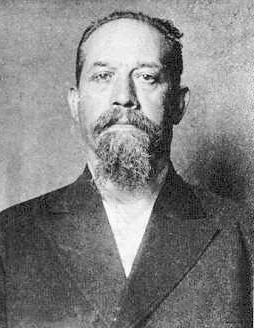
Luigi Galleani, an early leading proponent of insurrectionary anarchism

Contemporaneous with the rise of anarcho-syndicalism, insurrectionary anarchism was promoted in the United States by the Italian immigrant Luigi Galleani, through his newspaper Cronaca Sovversiva. Galleani was a staunch anti-organisationalist, opposing anarchist participation in the labour movement, which he felt displayed reformist tendencies and a receptiveness to corruption. This stance brought Galleani into conflict with the Industrial Workers of the World (IWW) during the 1912 Lawrence textile strike, following which they entered into a fierce polemic. However, outside observers paid little attention to the differences between the anarchist factions, who were generally viewed as part of the same "amorphous inscrutable threat".

Galleani advocated for propaganda of the deed, which was taken up throughout North America by a network of Galleanist cells, usually consisting of close-knit individuals. Following the American entry into World War I and the ensuing political repression that followed, the Galleanists initiated a violent campaign in opposition to the American government. After some Italian anarchists were killed by police for tearing down an American flag, the Galleanists carried a reprisal attack, which itself triggered a wave of arrests against insurrectionists. When one of the Italian insurrectionists was threatened with deportation, the Galleanists responded with a bombing campaign, sending letter bombs to industrialists, politicians and lawyers. None of the bombs hit their targets, instead injuring a housekeeper and accidentally killing one of the insurrectionist conspirators. Although the conspirators themselves were never caught, Galleani and other Italian insurrectionists were deported and the bombings were used as justification for repression of the 1919 strike wave.

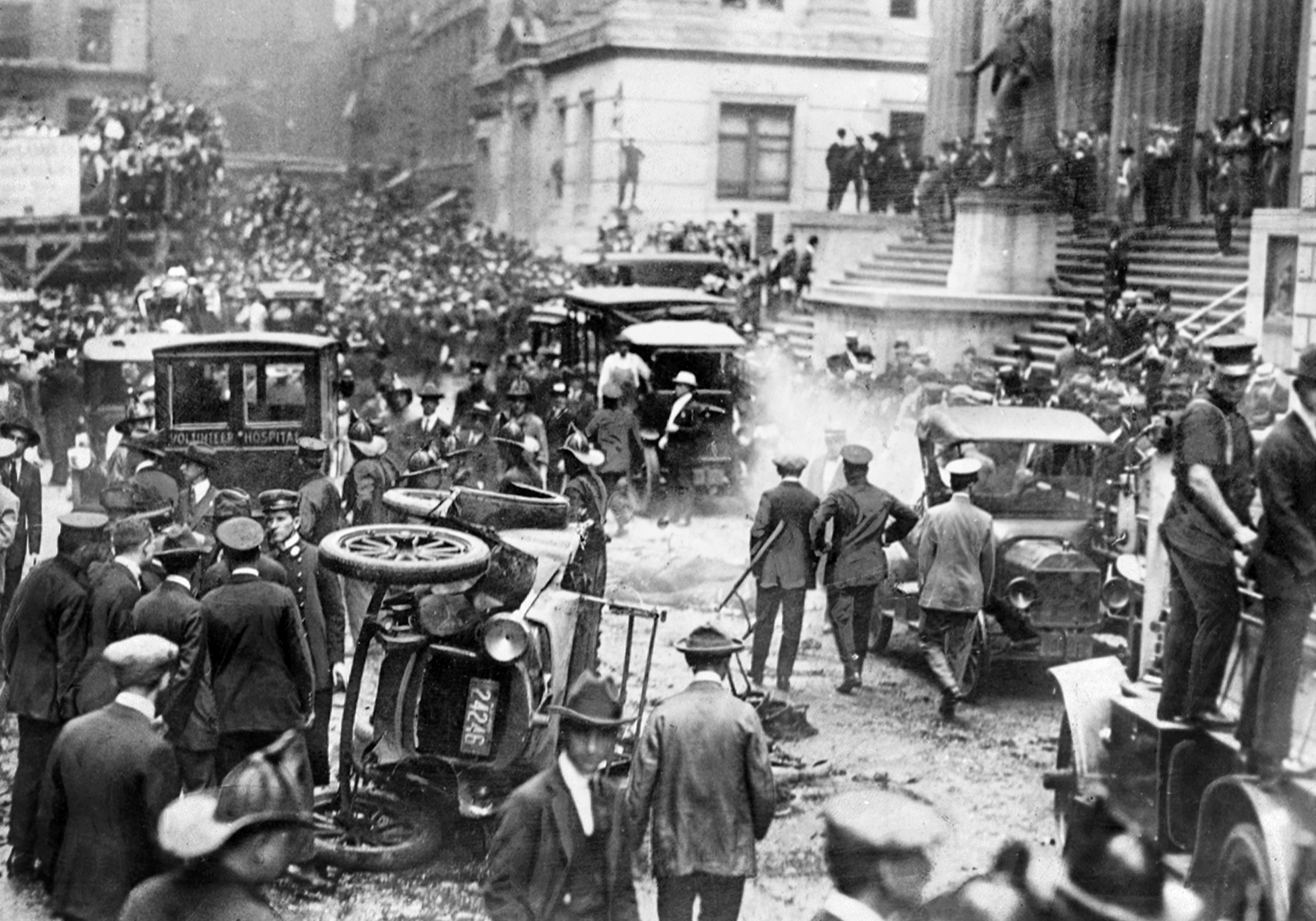
Aftermath of the Wall Street bombing (1920)

During the subsequent political repression, the Italian anarchists Sacco and Vanzetti were arrested on charges of armed robbery. The Galleanists responded by carrying out the Wall Street bombing, killing 38 people and making the task of exonerating the pair more difficult. Nevertheless, the Galleanists continued their efforts to aid Sacco and Vanzetti, who they considered to have been framed. In 1922, they began publication of L'Adunata dei refrattari, in which they encouraged their readers to break the pair out of prison and carry out retributive violence against the responsible state officials. This further exacerbated the split between the syndicalists and insurrectionists, as the two factions excluded each other from their own campaigns.

Political repression largely drove the insurrectionary anarchist movement underground, with Marcus Graham declaring that they would continue to operate on a conspiratorial basis until they could again agitate in the open. During the late 1920s, Graham moved to San Francisco, where he became involved with insurrectionary anarchists around the Galleanist newspaper L'Emancipazione. As the Great Depression limited their capacity, the paper shifted to publications in the English language and invited Graham to be its editor. In January 1933, the group established the newspaper Man!, intended as a means to revive the Galleanism of the previous decade. For Graham and his collaborators, the social revolution was to be built on individuals achieving a form of enlightenment that would break them from "every law, custom and sham creed in which he now finds himself trapped". Like early insurrectionists, Man! rejected syndicalism and the labour movement, which they considered to be inherently authoritarian, and frequently criticised union officials for corruption. Graham also formulated a criticism of technology and called for the destruction of civilisation, in arguments that were an early precursor to anarcho-primitivism.

Man! and L'Adunata dei refrattari continued to act as the main expressions of insurrectionary anarchism throughout the 1930s, but failed to revive it as a popular tendency. Before long, Man! came under increasing police repression, culminating with Graham's arrest and the subsequent cessation of publication in 1939. By the 1940s, the insurrectionary anarchist movement was only a marginal force, concentrated around L'Adunata dei refrattari in New York. The periodical slowly declined until the early 1970s, when it was finally succeeded by the anti-authoritarian publication Fifth Estate.

=== Resurgence ===
Insurrectionary anarchism re-emerged within the Italian anarchist movement during the Years of Lead, when the country was marked by instances of left-wing and right-wing terrorism. In 1977, Alfredo Bonanno published his book Armed Joy, which espoused a critique of work, emphasised the feeling of joy, and advocated for the use of revolutionary violence. Although Bonanno was imprisoned for the book's publication and the Italian state ordered all copies be destroyed, he continued to pen insurrectionist manifestos. As the Cold War drew to a close, he called for insurrectionary anarchists to coordinate themselves into an informal "Anti-Authoritarian Insurrectionist International" in order to build contact and exchange ideas, but this project was stillborn.

During the 1980s, Italian insurrectionary anarchists began carrying out small acts of vandalism against "soft targets" such as telecommunications and electricity infrastructure. These were usually carried out by small informal groups, largely distributed throughout Northern and Central Italy, that focused on localised social conflicts. These attacks escalated into violence during the late 1990s, when insurrectionists began carrying out bombings and assaults. The escalation initially caught the Italian authorities off guard, as they were used to these attacks being carried out without casualties.

Between the years of 1999 and 2003, four insurrectionist groups carried out a series of more than 20 bombing attacks, following which they merged into the Informal Anarchist Federation (FAI) in December 2003. To announce their formation, the FAI carried out a series of bombing attacks against various officials of the European Union, including the European President Romano Prodi, although none of the letter bombs sent out caused any injuries. A further series of letter bomb attacks were carried out by the FAI in 2010 and 2011, during which a number of people were injured. After a cell of the FAI kneecapped an executive of Ansaldo Nucleare in 2012, fears of anarchist terrorism spread rapidly throughout Italy. This led to a wave of arrests against insurrectionary anarchists, including one of the attackers Alfredo Cospito, which briefly put the FAI into an "operational stasis" before they resumed parcel bomb attacks the following year. Over a decade of active operations, the FAI claimed 50 violent attacks, having caused 10 injuries and no deaths.

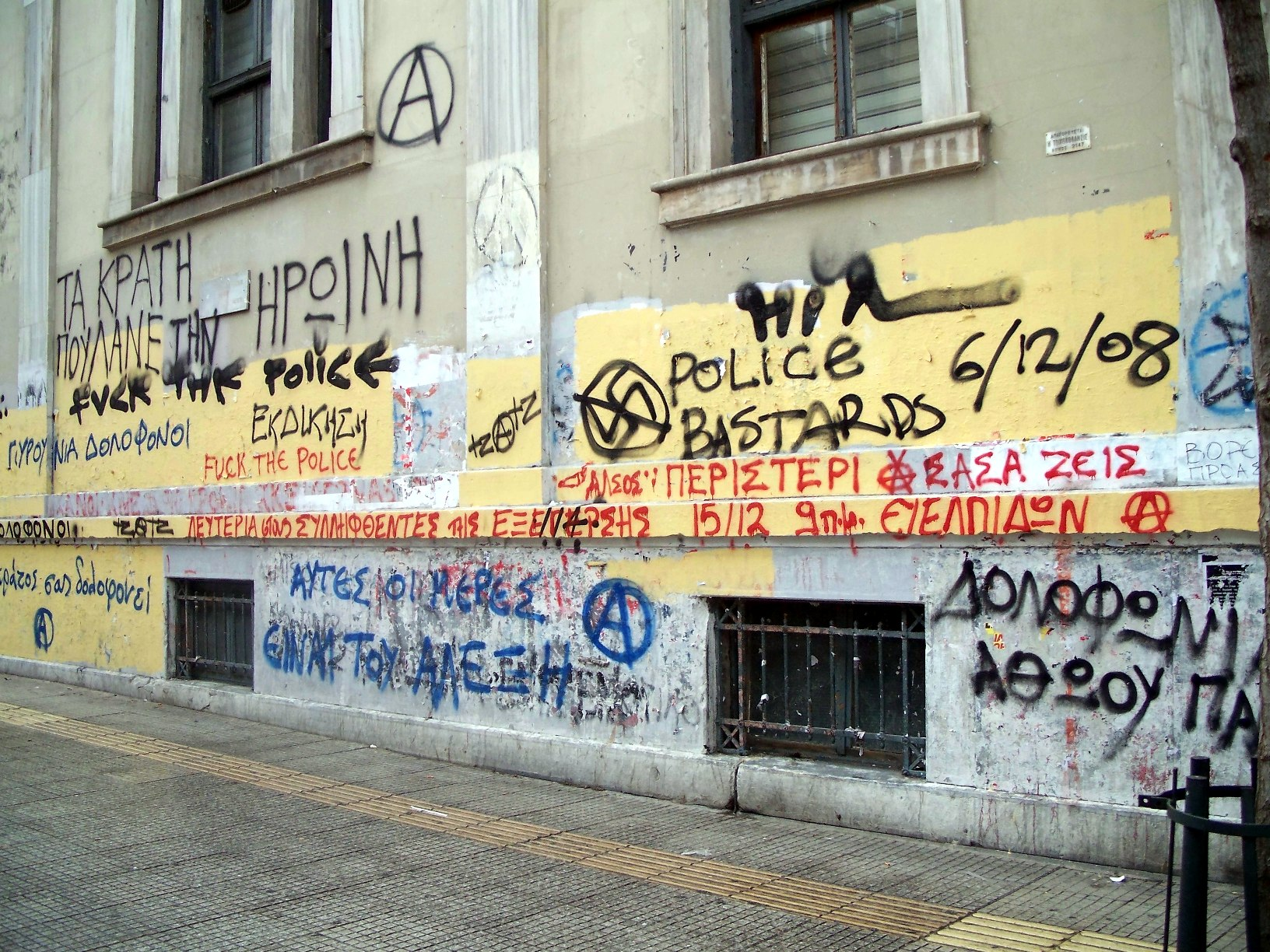
Anarchist graffiti during the 2008 Greek riots

Since the dissolution of the Red Brigades, insurrectionary anarchists have been considered by the Italian government to be among the most dangerous domestic terrorists in Italy, second only to Islamic terrorists. The FAI's example was followed on an international scale by a number of other insurrectionary anarchist groups, most notably the Conspiracy of Cells of Fire (CCF) in Greece, who joined with the FAI to launch what they called the "Black International". Parts of Bonanno's insurrectionary programme have also been taken up by anarchist sections of the anti-globalization movement, as well as by the Sardinian nationalist Costantino Cavalleri and the American individualist Wolfi Landstreicher.

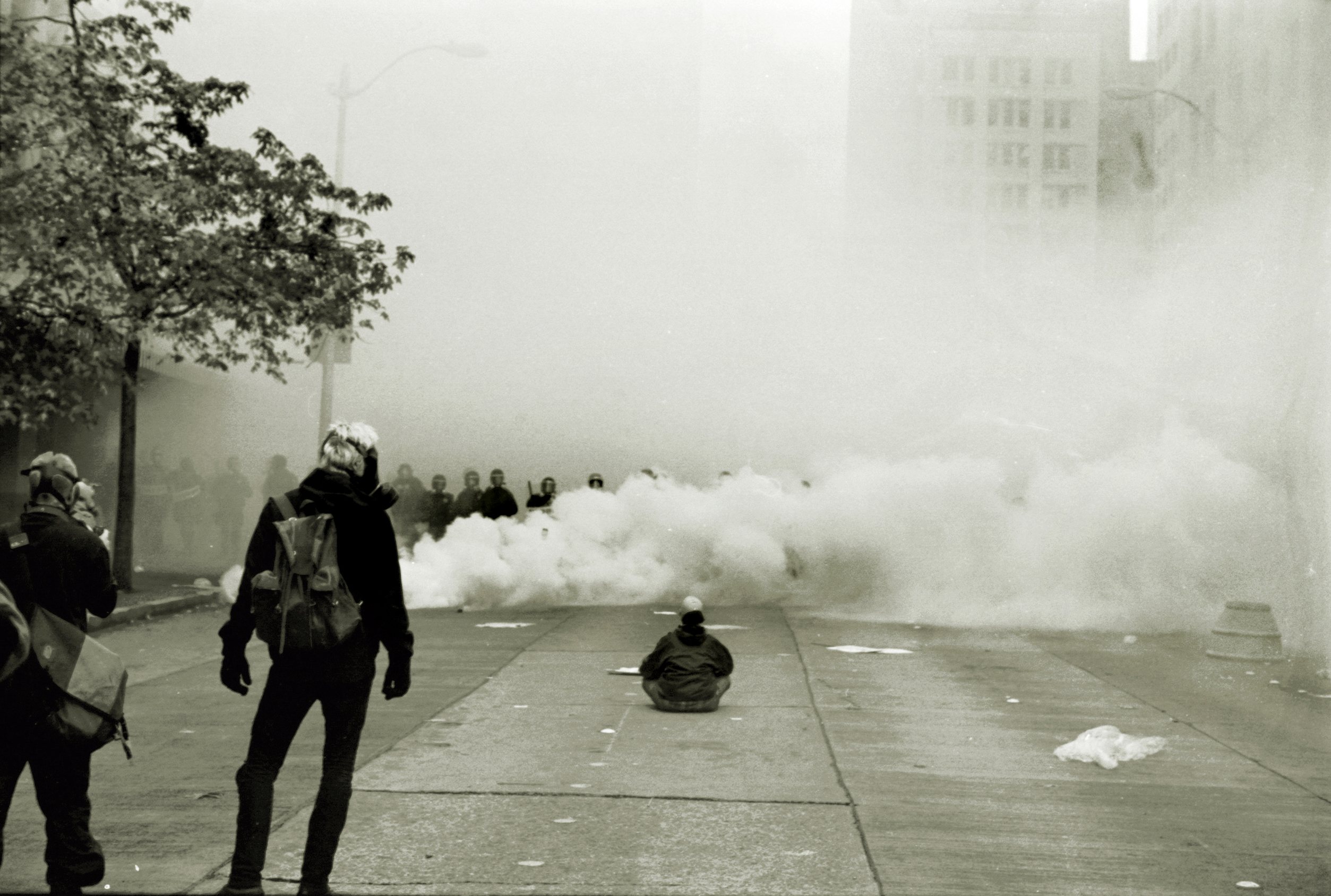
Protester facing riot police in the "Battle of Seattle"

In the United States, insurrectionary anarchism had largely been sidelined until the establishment of Up Against the Wall Motherfucker, which promoted the use of violent direct action in solidarity with the King assassination riots. During the mid-2000s, nihilists that were inspired by the rise of insurrectionism in Europe established Anarchy: A Journal of Desire Armed (AJODA), which took up the insurrectionist calls to violence and whose members participated in occupation protests. Insurrectionary anarchists went onto play a leading role in the Occupy movement, although they often clashed with activists that promoted civil disobedience and prefigurative politics, and ultimately failed to develop a long-term strategy for the movement.

== Theory and practice ==
Insurrectionary anarchism generally upholds core anarchist principles, such as anti-authoritarianism, anti-capitalism, anti-clericalism, anti-imperialism, anti-militarism and anti-statism. It has also historically combined with other causes, including radical environmentalism, national liberation struggles and the prison abolition movement.

=== Direct action ===
Insurrectionary anarchists generally undertake two basic types of direct action: vandalism of low-profile targets, such as infrastructure or buildings; and violent attacks, often using letter bombs, against political or military targets.

Insurrectionary anarchists often see direct action as a form of emotional release, and participating in action as a source of joy. Militants of the FAI, such as Alfredo Cospito, described their attack against an Italian executive as a moment where they "fully enjoyed my life". Insurrectionists can also see violence as a method of self-empowerment and even, in existential terms, as a means to achieve enlightenment.

=== Informal organisation ===
Insurrectionary anarchism shares the anarchist opposition to hierarchical organisation, but goes even further as to oppose any form of organisational structure in general. Instead, insurrectionists emphasise small, informal and temporary forms of organisation, such as affinity groups, that can together undertake direct action. Often formed from pre-existing interpersonal relationships, these groups utilise consensus decision-making to collectively elaborate a programme for attacks against the state and capitalism.

The insurrectionist organisational model has been compared to that of "leaderless resistance", which encourages the independent action of small groups and lone wolves, without an overarching centralised hierarchy. This model minimises risks of espionage and internal debate, while also fostering a degree of ideological pluralism, so long as it doesn't distract from direct action. This model has been noted both for its capacity to resist infiltration, but also for its tendencies towards isolation, and the development of an unofficial leadership. While informal organisation can allow for a certain amount of flexibility and adaptability, information sharing is also hampered by its compartmentalised structure and the reliance of interpersonal trust can present a barrier to recruitment.

== See also ==
- Anarchism in Greece
- Asymmetric warfare
- Black bloc
- Clandestine cell system
- Egoist anarchism
- Expropriative anarchism
- Illegalism
- Insurgency
- International Anarchist Congress of Amsterdam
- Irregular warfare
- Guerrilla warfare
- Resistance movement
- Social anarchism
- Tiqqun
- Diversity of tactics
- Civil disobedience
- Neozapatismo

== Bibliography ==
- Baker, Zoe (2023). "Insurrectionist Anarchism". Means and Ends: The Revolutionary Practice of Anarchism in Europe and the United States. AK Press. pp. 175–210. ISBN 978-1-84935-498-1. OCLC 1345217229.
- Cornell, Andrew (2016). Unruly Equality: U.S. Anarchism in the Twentieth Century. University of California Press. ISBN 978-0-520-28675-7. LCCN 2015022451.
- Dunlap, Alexander (2020). "The direction of ecological insurrections: political ecology comes to daggers with Fukuoka". Journal of Political Ecology. 27 (1): 988–1014. Bibcode:2020JPolE..2723751D. doi:10.2458/v27i1.23751. hdl:10852/83823. S2CID 230585518.
- Fadley, Aditya Rahman (2021). "From Protests to Politics of Insurrection: New Movement for Indonesian Anarchism Network, Translocal and International Solidarity". Asian Journal of Law and Governance. 3 (3): 37–50. ISSN 2710-5849.
- Graham, Robert (2018). "Anarchism and the First International". In Adams, Matthew S.; Levy, Carl (eds.). The Palgrave Handbook of Anarchism. London: Palgrave Macmillan. pp. 325–342. doi:10.1007/978-3-319-75620-2_19. ISBN 978-3319756196. S2CID 158605651.
- Kuukkanen, Mari (2018). "Diffusion of radical repertoires across Europe: The arrival of insurrectionary anarchism to Finland". In Wennerhag, Magnus; Fröhlich, Christian; Piotrowski, Grzegorz (eds.). Radical Left Movements in Europe. Routledge. doi:10.4324/9781315603483-11. ISBN 9781315603483.
- Loadenthal, Michael (2017). The Politics of the Attack: A Discourse of Insurrectionary Communiqués. Manchester University Press. ISBN 978-1-5261-1444-0. JSTOR j.ctv18b5k7t.
- Marone, Francesco (2015). "The rise of insurrectionary anarchist terrorism in Italy". Dynamics of Asymmetric Conflict. 8 (3): 194–214. doi:10.1080/17467586.2015.1038288. ISSN 1746-7594. S2CID 145354106.
- Murray, Daniel (2010). "Democratic Insurrection: Constructing the Common in Global Resistance". Millennium: Journal of International Studies. 39 (2): 461–482. doi:10.1177/0305829810384756. S2CID 144347622.
- Newman, Saul (2016). "What is an Insurrection? Destituent Power and Ontological Anarchy in Agamben and Stirner" (PDF). Political Studies. 65 (2): 284–299. doi:10.1177/0032321716654498. S2CID 149157523.
- Newman, Saul (2019). "Postanarchism today: Anarchism and political theory". In Levy, Carl; Newman, Saul (eds.). The Anarchist Imagination: Anarchism Encounters the Humanities and the Social Sciences. Routledge. pp. 81–94. doi:10.4324/9781315693163-5. ISBN 978-1-138-78276-1. LCCN 2018057716. S2CID 243121414.
- Pengam, Alain (1987). "Anarcho-Communism". In Ribel, Maximilien; Crump, John (eds.). Non-Market Socialism in the Nineteenth and Twentieth Centuries. Palgrave Macmillan. pp. 60–82. doi:10.1007/978-1-349-18775-1_4. ISBN 978-1-349-18775-1.
- Pernicone, Nunzio (1993). Italian Anarchism, 1864-1892. Princeton University Press. ISBN 0-691-05692-7. LCCN 92-46661.
- Pinta, Saku (2009). "Anarchism, Marxism, and the ideological composition of the Chicago Idea". WorkingUSA. 12 (3): 421–450. doi:10.1111/j.1743-4580.2009.00247.x. ISSN 1089-7011.
- Sullivan, Sian (2004). "'We are heartbroken and furious!': Violence and the (anti-)globalisation movement(s)". In Eschle, Catherine; Maiguashca, Bice (eds.). Critical Theories, International Relations and 'the Anti-Globalisation Movement'. Routledge. doi:10.4324/9780203428016-19. ISBN 9780203428016.
- Turcato, Davide (2018). "Anarchist Communism". In Adams, Matthew S.; Levy, Carl (eds.). The Palgrave Handbook of Anarchism. London: Palgrave Macmillan. pp. 237–248. doi:10.1007/978-3-319-75620-2_13. ISBN 978-3319756196. S2CID 242094330.
- van der Walt, Lucien (2018). "Syndicalism". In Adams, Matthew S.; Levy, Carl (eds.). The Palgrave Handbook of Anarchism. London: Palgrave Macmillan. pp. 249–264. doi:10.1007/978-3-319-75620-2_14. ISBN 978-3319756196. S2CID 242074567.
- Williams, Dana M. (2018). "Tactics: Conceptions of Social Change, Revolution, and Anarchist Organisation". In Adams, Matthew S.; Levy, Carl (eds.). The Palgrave Handbook of Anarchism. London: Palgrave Macmillan. pp. 107–124. doi:10.1007/978-3-319-75620-2_6. ISBN 978-3319756196. S2CID 158841066.
- Williams, Leonard; Thomson, Brad (2011). "The Allure of Insurrection". Anarchist Developments in Cultural Studies. 2011 (1): 265–289. ISSN 1923-5615.
- Zimmer, Kenyon (2018). "Haymarket and the Rise of Syndicalism". In Adams, Matthew S.; Levy, Carl (eds.). The Palgrave Handbook of Anarchism. London: Palgrave Macmillan. pp. 353–370. doi:10.1007/978-3-319-75620-2_21. ISBN 978-3319756196. S2CID 242074567.
