= Leave the World Behind (soundtrack) =

Leave the World Behind (Soundtrack from the Netflix Film)

Soundtrack album by Mac Quayle
- Released: December 8, 2023
- Recorded: 2023
- Genre: Film score
- Length: 49:21
- Label: Netflix Music

Mac Quayle chronology
Gaslit (2022)	Leave the World Behind (Soundtrack from the Netflix Film) (2023)

Leave the World Behind (Soundtrack from the Netflix Film) is the soundtrack to the 2023 Netflix film Leave the World Behind, directed by Sam Esmail based on the 2020 novel of the same name by Rumaan Alam. The film's score is composed by Mac Quayle and released through Netflix Music on December 8, 2023, in conjunction with the film's Netflix release.

== Development ==
Mac Quayle composed the film's score; he collaborated with Esmail, who worked as an executive producer on Gaslit (2022). The film is Quayle's maiden composition for a film score, as he previously scored music for television series and composed additional music and programmed the score for several films.

Esmail sent him a playlist to Quayle, which consisted of mostly orchestral music which were avant-garde and European classical music that were dissonant and atonal. He started composing the score when the film's pre-production, as Esmail refrained from the use of contemporary music. Quayle wrote three cues and sent to Esmail to be used in the edit. Thereafter, he sketched ideas based on the script and wrote few motifs and orchestral elements derived from it. He further recorded it with a string and brass section, and chopped and screwed the recorded music and manipulated it which was used to write the remainder of the score. The composition simultaneously happened with Esmail editing the film, where he could send those finished materials during post-production. Nearly 80% of the film's score was composed and produced with the recorded materials, with Quayle recording the remainder of the score independently.

The instrumental palette consisted of cello, bass, violin, percussion besides strings and brass. Except for the opening piano motif, most of the piano cues were written in the beginning and more were written during the process of scoring the film; the opening piano motif was recorded later. To create the sounds for the deer, he recorded natural sounds blowing across an antler that felt the right tone for the film, and a percussionist provided him sounds of a rubber ball being rubbed in the metallic percussion that was oddly similar to the sounds of the antler which was also used in the film. Dana Niu orchestrated the score who implemented the musical ideas which Quayle envisioned and provided the right sounds that the composer achieved.

The original score consisted of nine notes inspired by French composer Olivier Messiaen and his Messiaen modes, namely Mode 3. Experimenting with that mode, he wrote the first three pieces based on it that produced "really interesting harmonic feeling". Later, he wrote the entire score in that one mode which he was apprehensive of it being carried throughout the film, but eventually happened. The pieces were composed in the C major which was modulated for couple of times that provided a harmonic and melodic feeling.

"The Paradigm" written and performed by Lil Yachty was initially set to be included for a studio album, before being made its way into the film. While the film features a compilation of songs, notably "Too Close" by Next and "I'll Be There for You" by the Rembrandts (theme song for the television sitcom Friends), all of them were not included in the soundtrack.

== Critical reception ==
Jeff Conway of Forbes wrote "The score throughout Leave the World Behind creates a heightened intensity to the developing storyline on-screen, as well as enhances the overall mystery, as both the characters and the audience question what exactly is happening." Kristen Lopez of TheWrap called "Mac Quayle’s dark soundtrack is an immediate throwback" to The Twilight Zone and Black Mirror. Brianna Zigler of Paste summarised that Quayle's score "imbues wonder and intrigue and an excruciating acceleration of tension."

However, Filmtracks.com gave a negative review, saying "The music is thus basically sufficient, but it ultimately lacks any personal touch where one was needed in the finished film." Stephen Farber of The Hollywood Reporter noted that Quayle's "overbearing score [...] too often crushes any subtlety that might have existed in the script."

== Track listing ==
Leave the World Behind (Soundtrack from the Netflix Film) track listing
No.	Title	Length
1.	"Space"	1:12
2.	"Beach Day"	2:55
3.	"White Lion"	1:49
4.	"Good Omen"	1:00
5.	"Knock at the Door"	2:10
6.	"Cyberattack"	2:28
7.	"The Deer"	1:08
8.	"Red Rain"	5:28
9.	"Self-proclaimed Survivalist"	3:19
10.	"Sirens"	2:13
11.	"The Flood"	1:31
12.	"I'm Done Waiting"	4:57
13.	"Spiral"	4:32
14.	"We've All Been Deserted"	2:05
15.	"Human vs. Nature"	5:14
16.	"The Third Stage"	5:01
17.	"The Paradigm" (by Lil Yachty)	2:19
Total length:		49:21
