= Leave the World Behind =

Leave the World Behind may refer to:

- "Leave the World Behind" (song), a 2009 song by Swedish House Mafia
- Leave the World Behind (novel), a 2020 novel by Rumaan Alam
- Leave the World Behind (film), a 2023 film based on the novel

== See also ==
- "Leave This World Behind", song on the album Outcast by Kreator
