= List of J. K. Simmons performances =

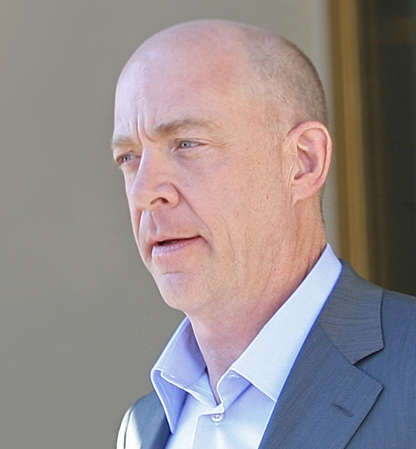
Simmons at the 2007 Toronto International Film Festival

J. K. Simmons is an American actor, considered one of the most prolific and well-established character actors of his generation. He has appeared in over 200 films and television roles since his debut in 1986 with film roles including J. Jonah Jameson in Sam Raimi's Spider-Man trilogy (2002–2007), Thank You for Smoking with Aaron Eckhart (2005), Juno (2007), Whiplash with Miles Teller (2014), for which he won the Academy Award for Best Supporting Actor, La La Land with Ryan Gosling (2016), Commissioner Jim Gordon in Justice League (2017), Santa Claus in Klaus (2019) and Red One (2024), and William Frawley in Being the Ricardos (2021). He reprised his role as Jameson in various Marvel media unrelated to the Raimi trilogy, including the Marvel Cinematic Universe films Spider-Man: Far From Home (2019) and Spider-Man: No Way Home (2021), the Sony's Spider-Man Universe film Venom: Let There Be Carnage (2021), and the animated film Spider-Man: Across the Spider-Verse (2023). He has also voiced Jameson in a multitude of animated television shows.

On television, he is known for playing Dr. Emil Skoda in the Law & Order franchise (1997–2010), white supremacist prisoner Vernon Schillinger on the HBO series Oz (1997–2003), and Assistant Police Chief Will Pope on the TNT series The Closer (2005–2012). From 2017 to 2019, he starred as Howard Silk in the Starz series Counterpart. In 2020, he had recurring roles on the miniseries Defending Jacob and The Stand.

As a voice artist, he is known for voicing Magister Prior Gilhil on Ben 10: Alien Force and Ben 10: Ultimate Alien, Cave Johnson in the video game Portal 2 (2011) and its spin-off Aperture Desk Job (2022), Tenzin in The Legend of Korra (2012–2014), Stanford "Ford" Pines in the second season of Gravity Falls (2015–2016), Kai in Kung Fu Panda 3 (2016), Mayor Leodore Lionheart in Zootopia (2016), Nolan Grayson / Omni-Man in Invincible (2021–present) and Mortal Kombat 1 (2023), and Captain Putty in Chip 'N Dale: Rescue Rangers (2022).

== Film ==
Year	Title	Role	Notes	Ref.
1994	The Ref	Colonel Siskel		
1994	The Scout	Assistant Coach		
1996	The First Wives Club	Federal Marshal		
1996	Extreme Measures	Dr. Mingus		
1997	Love Walked In	Mr. Shulman		
1997	Crossing Fields	Guy		
1997	The Jackal	FBI Agent Timothy I. Witherspoon		
1997	Anastasia	Additional voices	Voice	
1998	Celebrity	Souvenir Hawker		
1998	Above Freezing	Hoyd		
1999	Hit and Runway	Ray Tilman		
1999	The Cider House Rules	Ray Kendall		
1999	For Love of the Game	Frank Perry		
1999	I Lost My M in Vegas	Yellow	Voice; short film	
2000	Autumn in New York	Dr. Tom Grandy		
2000	The Gift	Sheriff Pearl Johnson		
2001	The Mexican	Ted Slocum		
2002	Spider-Man	J. Jonah Jameson		
2003	Disposal	Old-Age Hunter	Short film	
2003	Off the Map	George		
2004	Hidalgo	William "Buffalo Bill" Cody		
2004	The Ladykillers	Garth Pancake		
2004	Spider-Man 2	J. Jonah Jameson		
2005	Thank You for Smoking	B.R.		
2005	Pom Poko	Seizaemon	Voice; English dub	
2005	Harsh Times	Agent Richards		
2006	First Snow	Vacaro		
2006	The Astronaut Farmer	Jacobson		
2007	Spider-Man 3	J. Jonah Jameson		
2007	Postal	Candidate Welles		
2007	Juno	Mac MacGuff		
2007	Rendition	Lee Mayer		
2008	Burn After Reading	CIA Superior		
2009	The Vicious Kind	Donald Sinclaire		
2009	New in Town	Stu Kopenhafer		
2009	The Way of War	Sergeant Mitchell		
2009	Red Sands	Lieutenant Colonel Arson		
2009	I Love You, Man	Oswald Klaven		
2009	Aliens in the Attic	Skip	Voice	
2009	Post Grad	Roy Davies		
2009	Extract	Brian		
2009	Up in the Air	Bob		
2009	Jennifer's Body	Mr. Wroblewski		
2010	4192: The Crowning of the Hit King	Narrator	Voice; documentary	
2010	Crazy on the Outside	Ed		
2010	An Invisible Sign	Mr. Jones		
2010	A Beginner's Guide to Endings	Uncle Pal		
2010	Megamind	Warden	Voice	
2010	Cats & Dogs: The Revenge of Kitty Galore	Gruff K-9	Voice	
2010	True Grit	J. Noble Daggett	Voice; uncredited	
2011	The Music Never Stopped	Henry Sawyer		
2011	The Good Doctor	Detective Krauss		
2011	Blackstone	Detective Burke	Short film	
2011	Young Adult	Mavis's Publisher	Voice; uncredited	
2012	The Words	Mr. Jansen		
2012	Contraband	Captain Camp		
2012	Adventure Planet	President of Capitol State	Voice	
2013	Jobs	Arthur Rock		
2013	Dark Skies	Edwin Pollard		
2013	3 Geezers!	J. Kimball		
2013	Labor Day	Mr. Jervis		
2013	The Heeler	Roscoe	Short film	
2013	The Magic Bracelet	The Shaman	Short film	
2013	Whiplash	Terence Fletcher	Short film	
2014	Whiplash	Terence Fletcher		
2014	Barefoot	Dr. Bertleman		
2014	Break Point	Jack		
2014	The Boxcar Children	Dr. Moore	Voice	
2014	Murder of a Cat	Sheriff Frank Hoyle		
2014	The Rewrite	Dr. Hal Lerner		
2014	Men, Women & Children	Allison's Dad		
2014	Ava & Lala	General Tiger	Voice	
2015	The Jay Z Story	Nas	Short film	
2015	April and the Extraordinary World	Rodrigue	Voice	
2015	Terminator Genisys	O'Brien		
2015	The Meddler	"Zipper"		
2015	Worlds Apart	Sebastian		
2016	The Accountant	Raymond King		
2016	Kung Fu Panda 3	Kai	Voice	
2016	Zootopia	Mayor Lionheart	Voice	
2016	Punching Henry	Jay Warren		
2016	La La Land	Bill		
2016	The Late Bloomer	James Newmans		
2016	Patriots Day	Sergeant Jeffrey Pugliese		
2017	Rock Dog	Khampa	Voice	
2017	All Nighter	Mr. Gallo		
2017	The Black Ghiandola	Ralph Aceto	Short film	
2017	The Bachelors	Bill Palet		
2017	Renegades	Levin		
2017	I'm Not Here	Steve		
2017	The Snowman	Arve Stop		
2017	Justice League	Detective Jim Gordon		
2017	Father Figures	Roland Hunt		
2018	A Boy Called Sailboat	Ernest		
2018	The Boxcar Children: Surprise Island	Dr. Moore	Voice	
2018	The Front Runner	Bill Dixon		
2019	Fanboy	J.K. / Frank Perry	Short film	
2019	Spider-Man: Far From Home	J. Jonah Jameson	Cameo	
2019	3 Days with Dad	Joey		
2019	Klaus	Klaus (Santa Claus)	Voice	
2019	21 Bridges	Captain Matt McKenna		
2020	Palm Springs	Roy Schlieffen		
2021	The Tomorrow War	James Forester		
2021	Ride the Eagle	Carl		
2021	Venom: Let There Be Carnage	J. Jonah Jameson	Uncredited cameo; mid-credits scene	
2021	Seal Team	Claggart	Voice	
2021	Ghostbusters: Afterlife	Ivo Shandor	Cameo	
2021	Being the Ricardos	William Frawley		
2021	National Champions	Coach James Lazor		
2021	Spider-Man: No Way Home	J. Jonah Jameson		
2022	Morbius	J. Jonah Jameson	Cameo; deleted scenes	
2022	Marmaduke	Zeus	Voice	
2022	Chip 'n Dale: Rescue Rangers	Captain Putty	Voice	
2022	Glorious	Ghatanothoa	Voice	
2023	Little Brother	Warren Duffy		
2023	One Day as a Lion	Walter Boggs		
2023	Rally Road Racers	Gnash	Voice	
2023	Spider-Man: Across the Spider-Verse	J. Jonah Jameson	Voice	
2023	The Venture Bros.: Radiant Is the Blood of the Baboon Heart	Ben	Voice	
2024	You Can't Run Forever	Wade		
2024	The Union	Tom Brennan		
2024	Saturday Night	Milton Berle		
2024	Juror No. 2	Harold		
2024	Red One	Nick (Santa Claus)		
2025	The Accountant 2	Raymond King		
2026	The Brink of War	George Shultz		
2026	Heart of the Beast	Watkins		
2026	Purgatory	Father Malone		
TBA	Monkey Quest †	Vex	Post-production; voice	
TBA	The Prince †		Post-production	
TBA	The Thing That Hurts †		Post-production	

Key
†	Denotes films that have not yet been released

== Television ==
Year	Title	Role	Notes	Ref.
1986	Popeye Doyle	Patrolman In Park	Television film	
1987	All My Children	RCMP Sergeant	1 episode	
1994	Law & Order	Jerry Luppin	Episode: "Sanctuary"	
1995	New York News	Actor	Episode: "Welcome Back Cotter"	
1995	The Adventures of Pete & Pete	Barber Dan	Episode: "Saturday"	
1996	Homicide: Life on the Street	Colonel Alexander Rausch	Episode: "For God and Country"	
1996	Swift Justice	Mel Turman	Episode: "Stones"	
1996, 1998	New York Undercover	Sergeant Treadway / Dr. Emil Skoda	2 episodes	
1997	Face Down	Herb Aames	Television film	
1997	Spin City	Kevin	Episode: "Hot in the City"	
1997–2003	Oz	Vernon Schillinger	56 episodes	
1997–2010	Law & Order	Dr. Emil Skoda	Recurring role (seasons 8–14, 20); Guest role (season 15); 44 episodes	
1998	Remember WENN	Captain Amazon	Episode: "All's Noisy on the Pittsburgh Front"	
1999, 2015	Saturday Night Live	Vernon Schillinger / Himself (host)	2 episodes	
2000	Third Watch	Frank Hagonon	Episode: "Demolition Derby"	
2000–2001	Law & Order: Special Victims Unit	Dr. Emil Skoda	6 episodes	
2002	Path to War	CIA Briefer	Television film	
2002	Law & Order: Criminal Intent	Dr. Emil Skoda	Episode: "Crazy"	
2003	John Doe	Lucas Doya	Episode: "The Rising"	
2003	Everwood	Phil Drebbles	Episode: "Burden of Truth"	
2004	3: The Dale Earnhardt Story	Ralph Earnhardt	Television film	
2004	ER	Gus Loomer	Episode: "Impulse Control"	
2004	The D.A.	Deputy District Attorney Joe Carter	2 episodes	
2004	Without a Trace	Mark Wilson	Episode: "Two Families"	
2004	The Jury	Ron Stalsukilis	Episode: "Last Rites"	
2004	Nip/Tuck	Ike Connors	Episode: "Kimber Henry"	
2004–2006	Justice League Unlimited	General Wade Eiling	Voice; 5 episodes	
2005	Arrested Development	General Anderson	Episode: "Switch Hitter"	
2005	Jack & Bobby	Cyrus Miller	Episode: "Running Scared"	
2005	Numb3rs	Dr. Clarence Weaver	Episode: "Vector"	
2005–2012	The Closer	Will Pope	109 episodes	
2006	The West Wing	Harry Ravitch	Episode: "Duck and Cover"	
2006–2019	The Simpsons	Additional voices	Voice; 5 episodes	
2007	Bury My Heart at Wounded Knee	James McLaughlin	Television film	
2007	Queens Supreme	Ernest Fingerman	Episode: "Let's Make a Deal"	
2007	Kim Possible	Martin Smarty	Voice; 3 episodes	
2007–2019	American Dad!	Additional voices	Voice; 5 episodes	
2008–2014	Phineas and Ferb	J.B. / Napoleon	Voice; 3 episodes	
2008	Ben 10: Alien Force	Magister Prior Ghilhil	Voice; episode: "Darkstar Rising"	
2009–2010	The Marvelous Misadventures of Flapjack	Poseidon / additional voices	Voice; 4 episodes	
2009–2010	Party Down	Leonard Stiltskin	2 episodes	
2010	The Life & Times of Tim	O'Flaherty Sr.	Voice; episode: "Stu is Good at Something"	
2010	Batman: The Brave and the Bold	Guardian #1	Voice; episode: "Revenge of the Reach!"	
2010	Ben 10: Ultimate Alien	Magister Prior Ghilhil	Voice; episode: "Escape From Aggregor"	
2010–2013	Generator Rex	White Knight / additional voices	Voice; 34 episodes	
2011	NTSF:SD:SUV::	Frank Forrest	Episode: "One Cabeza, Two Cabeza, Three Cabeza... Dead!"	
2011	Raising Hope	Bruce Chance	Episode: "The Cultish Personality"	
2011	Desert Car Kings	Narrator	Voice; 10 episodes	
2011	Pound Puppies	Lieutenant Rock	Voice; episode: "The K9 Kid"	
2011–2018	Robot Chicken	Various characters	Voice; 3 episodes	
2012–2014	Men at Work	P.J. Jordan	5 episodes	
2012	The Avengers: Earth's Mightiest Heroes	J. Jonah Jameson	Voice; episode: "Along Came a Spider"	
2012	The Venture Bros.	Ben (Old Man Potter)	Voice; episode: "A Very Venture Halloween"	
2012	Best Friends Forever	Don	Episode: "Put a Pin It"	
2012–2014	The Legend of Korra	Tenzin	Voice; 42 episodes	
2012–2015	Ultimate Spider-Man	J. Jonah Jameson / additional voices	Voice; 39 episodes	
2013	Lego Marvel Super Heroes: Maximum Overload	J. Jonah Jameson	Voice; television special	
2013	Parks and Recreation	Mayor Stice	Episode: "Partridge"	
2013	Family Tools	Tony Shea	10 episodes	
2013–2015	Avengers Assemble	J. Jonah Jameson	Voice; 4 episodes	
2013–2015	Hulk and the Agents of S.M.A.S.H.	J. Jonah Jameson	Voice; 10 episodes	
2014	Growing Up Fisher	Mel Fisher	13 episodes	
2014	Chozen	Gary Cullens	Voice; episode: "Family Weekend (or How Gary Got His Groove Back)"	
2014–2020	BoJack Horseman	Lenny Turtletaub	Voice; 13 episodes	
2015	Farmers Insurance: Monster Foot	Professor Burke	Television film	
2015	What Lives Inside	Benjamin "Pops" Delaney	2 episodes	
2015	Major Lazer	President Whitewall	Voice; 6 episodes	
2015	Saturday Night Live: Cut for Time	Grandpa	Episode: "Grandpa"	
2015–2016	Gravity Falls	Stanford "Ford" Pines	Voice; 7 episodes	
2016	Archer	Detective Bob Harris	Voice; 4 episodes	
2017	SpongeBob SquarePants	Conductor Maestro Mackerel	Voice; episode: "Snooze You Lose"	
2017	SuperMansion	Himself	Voice; episode: "I Don't Even Have to Use My J.K."	
2017–2019	No Activity	Leo	4 episodes	
2017–2019	Counterpart	Howard Silk / Howard Silk Prime	20 episodes	
2018	Farmers Insurance: Vengeful Vermin	Professor Burke	Television film	
2019	Brockmire	Matt "The Bat" Hardesty	4 episodes	
2019	Veronica Mars	Clyde Pickett	7 episodes	
2019–2022	The Daily Bugle	J. Jonah Jameson	12 episodes; web series	
2020	Brooklyn Nine-Nine	Frank Dillman	Episode: "Dillman"	
2020	Defending Jacob	Billy Barber	5 episodes	
2020	Coronavirus, Explained	Narrator	Voice; episode: "This Pandemic"	
2020	Home Movie: The Princess Bride	Grandfather	Episode: "Chapter Two: The Shrieking Eels"	
2020	The Stand	General William Starkey	Episode: "The End"	
2021–present	Invincible	Nolan Grayson / Omni-Man	Voice; 17 episodes	
2021	The Great North	Tusk Johnson	Voice; 2 episodes	
2021	Infinity Train	Pig Baby	Voice; 3 episodes	
2021	Goliath	George Zax	8 episodes	
2022	Night Sky	Franklin York	8 episodes	
2024	Die Hart	Jackson Pepper	6 episodes	
2025	Grimsburg	Mitchell Flute	Voice; episode: “Daddy Daddy Bang Bang”	
2026	The Westies	Eamon Sweeney		

== Video games ==
Year	Title	Voice role	Notes	Ref.
2000	M&M's The Lost Formulas	Yellow		
2005	Spider-Man 2	J. Jonah Jameson	PSP version only	
2007	Spider-Man 3	J. Jonah Jameson		
2008	Command & Conquer: Red Alert 3	President Howard T. Ackerman		
2011	Portal 2	Cave Johnson		
2011	Generator Rex: Agent of Providence	White Knight		
2014	The Legend of Korra	Tenzin		
2015	Lego Dimensions	Cave Johnson		
2022	Aperture Desk Job	Cave Johnson		
2022	Dota 2	Cave Johnson	Announcer Pack	
2023	Baldur's Gate 3	General Ketheric Thorm		
2023	Mortal Kombat 1	Nolan Grayson / Omni-Man	As part of "Kombat Pack" DLC	
2026	Invincible VS	Nolan Grayson / Omni-Man		

== Theatre ==
Year	Title	Role	Venue	Category	Ref.
1985	Guys and Dolls	Lieutenant Brannigan	Seattle Repertory Theatre	Regional	
1986	A Funny Thing Happened on the Way to the Forum	Miles Gloriosus	Alliance Theatre	Regional	
1986	A Little Night Music	Count Carl-Magnus Malcolm	Studio Arena Theatre	Regional	
1986	Peter Pan	Starkey	Pennsylvania Center Stage	Regional	
1987	Birds of Paradise	Andy	Promenade Theatre	Off-Broadway	
1988	Dandy Dick	Noah Topping	Union Square Theatre	Off-Broadway	
1988	Oklahoma!	Jud Fry	Minnesota Opera	Regional	
1989–1990	Annie 2: Miss Hannigan's Revenge	Deutch / Sgt. Clancy / Beautician / H. V. Kaltenborn / Albert Einstein	Kennedy Center	Regional	
1990	A Change in the Heir	Edwin	Edison Theatre	Broadway	
1991–1992	Peter Pan	Captain Hook / Mr. Darling	Minskoff Theatre & US tour	Broadway	
1992	Guys and Dolls	Benny Southstreet	Martin Beck Theatre	Broadway	
1993–1994	Laughter on the 23rd Floor	Brian	Richard Rodgers Theatre	Broadway	
1994	Das Barbecü	Various	Minetta Lane Theatre	Off-Broadway	
