= Max Barbakow =

American filmmaker

- Occupations: Director, writer, producer
- Years active: 2013–present
- Notable work: Palm Springs (2020) Brothers (2024)
- Website: https://www.maxbarbakow.com/bio

Max Barbakow is an American filmmaker. After directing short films and documentaries, he received widespread critical acclaim and recognition for his debut feature film, Palm Springs. He followed that movie with Brothers, starring Peter Dinklage and Josh Brolin. His upcoming projects include an untitled body swap film featuring Julia Roberts and Jennifer Aniston with LuckyChap Entertainment, as well as Epiphany, starring Bill Murray and Kristen Wiig.

== Education ==
Barbakow attended The Thacher School in Ojai, CA. He received his bachelor's degree from Yale University, trained with Werner Herzog in Cuba, and graduated from the AFI Conservatory in 2016 with an MFA in directing.

== Career ==
After making short films for a number of years, Barbakow directed his first feature film, Mommy, I'm a Bastard!, in 2013. His thesis at Yale, Mommy, I'm a Bastard! is a documentary about his open adoption and relationship with his birth mother.

Barbakow found widespread critical and commercial success after the release of Palm Springs. After its premiere at Sundance, Neon and Hulu acquired the distribution rights to the film in a $17.5 million deal, though later reports put the deal closer to $22 million. The film won Best Comedy at the 26th Critics' Choice Awards, Best Science Fiction/Fantasy Movie at the 2021 Critics' Choice Super Awards, and Best Comedy or Musical from the Hollywood Critics Association. Palm Springs also garnered two Golden Globe nominations, including Best Motion Picture Comedy, and Barbakow was nominated for The Writers Guild of America Award for Best Original Screenplay with Andy Siara.

In 2021, Barbakow participated in a commentary cut of Palm Springs, the first of its kind on a streaming platform.

Brothers, starring Brolin, Dinklage, Glenn Close, and Brendan Fraser, was released in the United States by Amazon MGM Studios in select theaters on October 11, 2024, before debuting on Amazon Prime Video on October 17, 2024.

Barbakow co-wrote and produced Soapbox with David Duchovny, with Andrew Jay Cohen set to direct. Filming began in March 2026.

== Personal life ==
Barbakow is married. He met his wife before production began on Palm Springs.

== Filmography ==
- Mommy, I'm a Bastard! (2013)
- The Duke: Based on the Memoir 'I'm the Duke' by J.P. Duke (2016, short film)
- Mi Dulcinea (2017, short film)
- Palm Springs (2020)
- Brothers (2024)
