= The Resort (TV series) =

American dark comedy mystery television series

- Promotional poster
- Genre: Comedy drama; Mystery
- Created by: Andy Siara
- Starring: William Jackson Harper; Cristin Milioti; Luis Gerardo Méndez; Skyler Gisondo; Nina Bloomgarden; Gabriela Cartol; Nick Offerman
- Composer: Andrew Carroll
- Country of origin: United States
- Original language: English
- No. of seasons: 1
- No. of episodes: 8

Production
- Executive producers: Andy Siara; Allison Miller; Sam Esmail; Chad Hamilton; Ben Sinclair
- Producers: Dana Scott; Gregg Tilson; Manuel Alcalá; Frances Lausell
- Production location: Puerto Rico
- Cinematography: Santiago Benet Mari; Santiago Gonzalez
- Editors: Taichi Erskine; Erick Fefferman; Henk Van Eeghen
- Running time: 31–39 min
- Production companies: All For Ramonez; Quadraturin; Esmail Corp.; Anonymous Content; Universal Content Productions

Original release
- Network: Peacock
- Release: July 28 – September 1, 2022

The Resort is an American dark comedy mystery television series created for Peacock by Andy Siara. The series stars Cristin Milioti and William Jackson Harper as a married couple on vacation at a holiday resort for their 10th anniversary, where they are drawn into a mystery that took place fifteen years before. It premiered on Peacock on July 28, 2022.

== Premise ==
Noah and Emma are vacationing in the Mayan Riviera for their 10th anniversary. Noah has been content with life, whereas Emma feels like their marriage is in a rut. They are then pulled into an unsolved mystery of two missing persons from 15 years earlier, which tests the resolve of their marriage.

== Cast ==
=== Main ===
- Cristin Milioti as Emma
- William Jackson Harper as Noah
- Luis Gerardo Méndez as Baltasar Frías, head of security at the resort circa 2007
- Skyler Gisondo as Sam Lawford, a tourist who disappeared in 2007
- Nina Bloomgarden as Violet Thompson, a tourist who disappeared in 2007
- Gabriela Cartol as Luna, a resort concierge
- Nick Offerman as Murray Thompson, the father of Violet, vacationing with her in 2007

=== Recurring ===
- Dylan Baker as Carl Lawford, Sam's dad
- Becky Ann Baker as Jan Lawford, Sam's mom
- Debby Ryan as Hanna, Sam's girlfriend
- Ben Sinclair as Alexander Vasilakis, the eccentric owner of the Oceana Vista resort, with a memory-loss condition
- Ricardo Laboy as Oliver, Oceana Vista bartender
- Carlos Rivera Marchand as Edwin, Oceana Vista concierge
- Gisela Rosario Ramos as Abigail, Oceana Vista landscaper

=== Guest ===
- Michael Hitchcock as Ted, vacationing with his husband, also called Ted, who befriends Emma and Noah.
- Parvesh Cheena as Ted, vacationing with his husband, also called Ted, who befriends Emma and Noah.
- Sergio Calderón as Silverio Narro, a detective who was forced into retirement after looking into the disappearance of Sam and Violet.
- Luis Guzmán as Illan Iberra, author of the novel La Desilusión del Tiempo

== Episodes ==
No.	Title	Directed by	Written by	Original release date
1	"The Disappointment of Time"	Ben Sinclair	Andy Siara	July 28, 2022
Married couple Emma and Noah arrive at a resort in the Riviera Maya for their 10th anniversary, hoping the trip will reignite their stagnating relationship. On an ATV trip through the jungle, Emma crashes off course and finds a Motorola Razr phone in the jungle. She discovers the phone belonged to Sam Lawford, a teenager who went missing in 2007 from the nearby Oceania Vista resort, along with Violet Thompson, another teenager staying at the resort. However, the Oceania Vista was destroyed by a hurricane the same night the two went missing, impeding the investigation. Noah finds the phone in Emma’s bag, and the two decide to investigate the case themselves rather than submitting the phone to police. In 2007, Sam is shown vacationing at the Oceania Vista, where he connects with Violet after learning his girlfriend is having an affair with her professor.
2	"A Noxious Toothworm"	Ben Sinclair	Andy Siara	July 28, 2022
In 2007, Violet helps care for Sam after a skateboard accident and the two exchange numbers. It is revealed that Violet’s mother died a year prior and left Violet a novel titled “El Desilusión del Tiempo,” with an inscription instructing Violet to reunite with her at “Pasaje” — a mystical place described in the book as being “outside of time.” In the present day, Emma and Noah read texts between Sam and Violet referencing the Frías clan, an alleged crime family in the Yucatan peninsula, and learn that the estranged Baltasar Frías was employed at the Oceania Vista. Looking through old staff photos from the Oceania Vista, they recognize Luna, a concierge still working in the riviera, and question her about Baltasar but are met with elusive answers. Eventually the two learn that Sam’s skateboard was found in Baltasar’s room the week of their disappearance, and that he was a prime suspect in the disappearance. Luna informs Baltasar that Emma and Noah are investigating the disappearance.
3	"Tempus Exhaurire"	Ben Sinclair	Vivian Barnes	July 28, 2022
In 2007, Sam and Violet attend a Christmas party at the Oceania Vista, where they meet Luna and Baltasar. Sam finds and confronts the man who stole his skateboard, stealing his key card and breaking into his penthouse room where he and Violet kiss. In the present day, Emma and Noah break into the ruined Oceania Vista and locate the penthouse room, matching it with a photo taken on Sam’s phone. The room also contains mysterious notes about “Pasaje” and a mural of the Oceania Vista depicting Baltasar, Luna, Sam, and Violet. Baltasar follows and ambushes Emma and Noah and tries to take Sam’s phone, but it drops down an elevator shaft during their scuffle.
4	"A History of Forgetting"	Ben Sinclair	Manuel Alcalá	August 4, 2022
In the present day, Baltasar explains to Emma and Noah that the room belonged to the Oceania Vista’s eccentric owner, Alex Vasilakis. After successfully running the resort alongside Baltasar and Luna for five years, Alex became unstable and began complaining that his memories were “leaking” out of his ears, writing cryptic notes about Pasaje, and experiencing prophetic visions of the resort being destroyed. Around the same time, Baltasar investigated Sam’s disappearance, recognizing him from the Christmas party, and learned that he and Violet were last seen with Alex, though he claimed to have no memory of meeting them. Baltasar later saw Alex commit suicide by walking naked into the sea before the approaching hurricane destroyed the resort. Baltasar then reveals that the mural Alex painted in 2007 contains prophetic depictions of Emma and Noah searching the resort in the present day.
5	"El Espejo"	Rania Attieh & Daniel Garcia	Mara Vargas Jackson	August 11, 2022
Baltasar, Emma, Noah and Luna return to the area where Sam’s phone was found to search for more evidence. Noah tells Luna that he and Emma lost a daughter during childbirth. Baltasar tries to convince Emma that she is connected to Sam and Violet over a shared loss and that she found the phone for a reason. Noah accidentally finds Violet’s phone, containing a video of Alex confessing that he encountered Sam and Violet in his room on the night of their disappearance and found “El Desilusión del Tiempo” among Violet’s things. Believing the book to be about himself, he warned Sam and Violet not to look for pasaje, then stole their phones and hid them in the jungle at a spot where he envisioned Emma crashing her ATV.
6	"Hünch fò Llub Sēēth"	Rania Attieh & Daniel Garcia	Dagny Atencio Looper	August 18, 2022
Baltasar recognizes the author of “El Desilusión del Tiempo,” Illan Iberra, as the same author who wrote a crime novel he read as a child, and who the Frias family later targeted because Baltasar did not like the ending of the book. Emma, Noah, and Baltasar visit the now sick and elderly Iberra, who confirms that Sam and Violet came to him in 2007 to ask about “El Desilusión del Tiempo.” Violet believed her mother’s investigations into the book would have created a map with Pasaje at the center, but her mother died before decoding the final location: “Hünch fò Llub Sēēth,” written in Iberra’s made up language. Iberra told Sam and Violet he was unaware of the exact location and dissuaded them from searching, but they ventured into the jungle regardless. In the present day, before Iberra can reveal the location’s translation, he notices the Frías insignia on Baltasar’s pen and attempts to kill him, but his anger overwhelms him and causes him to have a heart attack. Undeterred, Emma uses Iberra’s partial translation to determine the location of Pasaje herself.
7	"La Pubertad del Matrimonio"	Ariel Kleiman	Joey Siara	August 25, 2022
In 2007, Sam and Violet begin their search for Pasaje and share an intimate moment while camping together in the jungle. In the present day, Emma contacts Violet’s father Murray and shares with him the location of Pasaje before leaving to find it herself. She is followed by Noah, and later Baltasar, Luna and Murray. Camping in the jungle, Emma and Noah argue about their marriage, Baltasar states his desire to meet Alex again in Pasaje, and Murray shares his grief over Violet and his deceased wife. When Emma experiences a severe tooth infection, she asks Noah to pull it out with a pair of pliers. While relieving himself in the grass, Murray spots the entrance to Pasaje as described in the book.
8	"The Disillusionment of Time"	Ariel Kleiman	Teleplay by : Allison Miller & Derek Pastuszek; Story by : Allison Miller	September 1, 2022
Entering the cave found by Murray, the group discover a boat leading to a strange underground forest. Finding themselves at two branching tunnels, Baltasar and Murray explore one while Noah and Emma enter the other. In 2007, Sam and Violet locate and enter the cave as the approaching hurricane rages. With rain flooding the cave, the pair get lost and are unable to find their way out as the water level rises. As they resign to their fate and embrace each other, Violet sees a mysterious light. In the present day, Noah and Emma find Violet’s flashlight and spot a narrow tunnel in the cave wall, which Emma enters. At the end of the tunnel she finds Sam and Violet floating in Pasaje, a circular pool of light, where they have been suspended in time for fifteen years. She pulls them from the water and leads them out of the cave where Violet emotionally reunites with her father. Sam explains that the fifteen years in Pasaje felt like “five minutes” and liquid begins leaking from his ear; Violet shares with Emma that she reunited with her mother in Pasaje. Emma tells Noah that she saw their deceased daughter in the water but chose not to enter, instead choosing to stay in the real world with Noah. Violet and Murray leave to have dinner together while Sam goes to reunite with his parents. Later, back at the resort, while reminiscing on the journey, Baltasar and Luna debate whether Violet got a happy ending, reuniting with her mother but losing fifteen years with her father. Baltasar leaves, implicitly to reunite with Alex in Pasaje, as Luna cryptically smiles at the audience before following.

== Production ==
=== Development ===
In February 2020, it was reported that UCP was developing the dark comedy series The Resort from Sam Esmail and Andy Siara. In June 2021, it was announced Peacock had ordered the series, with Siara serving as a writer and Esmail serving as an executive producer under his Esmail Corp banner.

=== Casting ===
In January 2022, Luis Gerardo Méndez, Nina Bloomgarden, and Gabriela Cartol joined the cast in series regular roles, with Debby Ryan, Dylan Baker and Michael Hitchcock set to recur. In March 2022, William Jackson Harper, Cristin Milioti, Skyler Gisondo, and Nick Offerman joined the cast in series regular roles, while Ben Sinclair and Parvesh Cheena joined the cast in recurring capacity.

=== Filming ===
Principal photography began in March 2022, in Puerto Rico, and wrapped by May 2022. Executive producer Ben Sinclair directed the first four episodes. The fifth and sixth episodes were directed by filmmaking duo Rania Attieh and Daniel Garcia, with Ariel Kleiman directing the final two episodes.

== Release ==
The eight-episode series premiered on July 28, 2022, exclusively on Peacock. The premiere consists of the first three episodes, with new episodes debuting each Thursday after that. On August 24, 2022, NBC aired the pilot episode at 9 p.m. after a semi-final episode of America's Got Talent.

== Reception ==
On the review aggregator website Rotten Tomatoes, 86% of 36 critics' reviews are positive, with an average rating of 7.50/10. The website's consensus reads: "The Resort teases more mysteries than it can satisfyingly pay off, but its likable cast and jaunty tone make for a compulsively watchable vacation." Metacritic, which uses a weighted average, rated the series with a score of 70 out of 100, based on 16 critic reviews, indicating "generally favorable reviews".
