= A Change in the Heir =

Musical

- Music: Daniel C Sticco
- Lyrics: George H Gorham

A Change in the Heir is a musical comedy with music by Daniel C. Sticco, lyrics by George H. Gorham and book by George H. Gorham and Daniel C. Sticco. The show tells the story of how competing branches of the same royal family, each hoping to inherit the crown and kingdom, raise a daughter as a prince and a son as a princess. It is a comedic exploration of both the love story between the prince and princess and the effects of nature versus nurture and personal choice. After a 1988 production at the New Tuners Theatre, Chicago, the musical had a short Broadway run at the Edison Theatre from 29 April-13 May 1990, as well as a concert version at Jermyn Street Theatre, London.

== Productions ==
=== Chicago (1988) ===
The show premiered at the New Tuners Theatre in Chicago, directed by Stephen B. Scott, musical direction and musical conductor Daniel C. Sticco, choreography by Scott Sandoe, scenic designer Daniel Osting, costume designer Patricia Hart, lighting design by Daniel Kipp and orchestration by Ken Gist.

=== Broadway (1990) ===
Following its Chicago run, the musical played on Broadway from 29 April-13 May 1990 at the Edison Theatre, directed and choreographed by David H. Bell, musical direction and dance arrangements by Rob Bowman, scenery by Michael Anania, costumes by David Murin, lighting design by Jeff Davis and orchestrations by Robby Merkin.

=== Concert version ===
A concert version was produced and directed by Claire Evans on 3 December 2023 at Jermyn Street Theatre, London. A selection of songs from this production were recorded and are available on YouTube.

== Plot ==
=== Prologue ===
The show is set in a fictitious Northern European folk land of the Middle Ages. On the death of the King, who leaves only grand-daughters, his will makes stipulations that drive the plot of the show. The Crown will go to the first male heir who reaches the age of 20 with an unblemished reputation. If there is no male heir, then the Crown passes to the first female heir who reaches the age of 20 with unblemished character. In the meantime, the eldest grand-daughter, Duchess Julia, is in charge.

The Countess is the first to give birth. It is a girl. The Countess realises that if the Lady Enid has a son, her own daughter will not get the Crown. She decides to lie and announces that her daughter is a boy – Prince Conrad.

Lady Enid then gives birth to a boy. Her husband Sir Edwin, believing that the Countess has had a boy, realises that the best chance of his son becoming King lies in the clause about unblemished reputation. He decides that the best way to keep his son pure is to bring him up as a girl – Princess Agnes.

=== Act One ===
Twenty years go by, and we arrive at the 20th birthdays of Conrad and Agnes. The families gather for the birthday celebrations and the coronation across the course of a weekend. Edwin is trying his best to ensure that Conrad's virtue is in tatters, leaving the way clear for Agnes to ascend the throne. Duchess Julia is in no mood to give up her power and is determined that the virtue of both Conrad and Agnes are in shreds. Julia enlists the help of her illegitimate half-brother, Giles, to assist with the sullying of virtue. It is a busy weekend involving plotting and scheming amidst great banqueting.

Meanwhile Agnes and Conrad are feeling distinctly oppressed by the goings on. Giles is attempting to seduce Agnes and is naturally very firmly rebuffed. An attempt to get Conrad very drunk in the hope of him disgracing himself publicly fails when Conrad's friend Nicholas drinks the spiked shot. Conrad decides he and Nicholas should go for a swim in the moat to sober up Nicholas. Agnes shares her discomfiture with her friend Elizabeth. Elizabeth notices from the window that Nicholas and Conrad have been skinny dipping and are busy struggling back into clothes. This prompts Agnes to ask Elizabeth is she has ever seen a boy naked. Elizabeth says no, but then pulls out from behind the wardrobe her brother's picture book, which turns out to have a great deal of revelation in it. By the time they have reached the end, they both realise that Agnes is a boy. On the embankment of the moat Conrad and Nicholas have realised that Conrad is a girl.

While the adults are still scheming and plotting for the Crown, Agnes and Conrad are having to face what these revelations mean and where that leaves them. They find they like each other and decide to become allies. They experiment with dressing according to their birth sex and hardly recognise each other when they meet in the courtyard. They realise that they are falling in love and Martha, Julia's maid and sidekick, spots them visiting each other's rooms and kissing.

Julia's list of plots includes attempting to get hold of a birth certificate for Conrad with the intention of doctoring it to make it look like Conrad is illegitimate – she sends for the certificate by Express Pigeon. Nicholas overhears this plot and, realising that if Julia get hold of the certificate, she will discover that Conrad is a girl, decides that he and Elizabeth should intercept the pigeon. They are beaten to it by Giles. He can't read Middle Goth and so can't read the certificate, but nonetheless decides to hang on to it rather than hand it over to Julia. Julia then discovers that Conrad writes a diary and decides that this might yield the sort of damning revelations she is looking for and so she attempts to steal the diary. This leads to a farcical and slapstick sequence in which the diary passes through the hands of just about everyone but ends up with Julia.

=== Act Two ===
Nicholas decides that the only way to sort this out is to switch a diary he has written with the one Julia has stolen. Elizabeth helps him with this plan, and they manage to get hold of the real diary but not before Julia has read a page or two and discovered that Conrad is a girl. Giles persuades Elizabeth to read out the certificate and discovers that Conrad is a girl.

Agnes is in despair and wants Conrad to run away with him. Conrad feels she is duty-bound to stay and vows to reveal the truth. Giles, hedging his bets, secures contracts to marry both Agnes and Conrad – wherever the crown lands first. Julia believes she has a trump card in her possession of the diary, but as she starts reading it out loud to everyone assembled for the Coronation, realises that she has been tricked. Just as all the plots are unravelling fast, Conrad walks away.

Agnes finds Conrad and they discuss their options and in doing so realise that the solution is for them both to rule as King and Queen or Queen and King. At the core of the show is a love story and exploration of the effects of nature, nurture and personal choice.

== Musical numbers ==
Act One

- "Overture" – Orchestra
- "Prologue - Once Upon A Time" – Full Company
- "Exactly The Same As It Was" – Julia, Edwin, Enid, the Countess and Giles
- "The Weekend" – Full Company
- "Here I Am" – Conrad
- "Look At Me" – Conrad and Agnes
- "Take A Look At That" – Agnes and Elizabeth
- "I Did It For You" – Edwin, Enid, the Countess, Agnes and Conrad
- "Can't I?" – Conrad
- "When?" – Julia and Martha
- "Castle In The Air" – Conrad and Agnes
- "Ordinary Family" – Full Company

Act Two

- "Entr'acte" – Orchestra
- "Happily Ever After" – Agnes
- "Duet - Can't I?/Castle In The Air Reprise" – Conrad and Agnes
- "Hold That Crown" – Julia
- "Coronation/By Myself" – Full Company
- "Finale" – Full Company

=== Notes ===
"I Did It For You" was originally a solo performed by Edwin. It was expanded to include other characters for the Broadway production.

== Roles and casts ==
Character	Chicago	Broadway	Concert
Aunt Julia, Duchess von Landau, cousin to Countess and Enid	Jane Blass	Brooks Almy	Julia Main
Martha, Julia's Maid	Sally Jane Bannow	Jan Neuberger	Molly Corrigan-White
Sir Giles, a black sheep	Nathan Trent Rankin	Brian Sutherland	Jeremy Todd
Prince Conrad, the heir apparent	Anne Kanengeiser	Judy Blazer	Abbie Darley
Nicholas, Conrad's companion	Timothy Ortmann	David Gunderman	Gwithian Evans
Countess, Conrad's mother	Linda McLaughlin	Connie Day	Hilary Harwood
Cosmo, confidant to the Countess	Paul Winberg	N/A	N/A
Princess Agnes, a second cousin	Jeff Talbot	Jeffrey Herbst	Rees Parry
Edwin, Agnes' father	Brian-Mark Conover	J. K. Simmons	Karl Moffatt
Lady Enid, his wife	Sarah Worthington	Mary Stout	Bridget Lambert
Lady Elizabeth, Agnes' companion	Nan Leslie Kelly	Jennifer Smith	Gabi King
