= Comet (film) =

- Theatrical release poster
- Directed by: Sam Esmail
- Written by: Sam Esmail
- Produced by: Chad Hamilton; Lee Clay
- Starring: Emmy Rossum; Justin Long
- Cinematography: Eric Koretz
- Edited by: Franklin Peterson
- Music by: Daniel Hart
- Production company: Fubar Films
- Distributed by: IFC Films
- Release dates: June 13, 2014 (LA Film Festival); December 5, 2014
- Running time: 91 minutes
- Country: United States
- Language: English
- Box office: $19,530

Comet is a 2014 American romantic comedy-drama film directed and written by Sam Esmail. The film stars Emmy Rossum and Justin Long. The film had its world premiere at LA Film Festival on June 13, 2014. It was released on December 5, 2014, by IFC Films.

After meeting by chance at a meteor shower, pessimist Dell and insightful Kimberly begin a six-year journey of a relationship. The film is shown through glimpses of parallel universes and flashbacks that are not chronologically ordered, showing the viewer the ebb and flow of their intricate relationship.

== Plot ==
Neurotic and pessimistic Dell, who works for a pharmaceutical company, is waiting in line at the Hollywood Forever Cemetery in Los Angeles to watch a meteor shower. He is so stunned by a woman who arrives at the cemetery that he is nearly run over by an oncoming car, but the woman, Kimberly, alerts him just in time. Dell asks Kimberly for her phone number, even though she is on a date with Josh, a handsome but shallow man. When confronted by Josh, Dell backs off, but not before taking jabs at Dell's superficiality and lack of personality, which makes Kimberly laugh.

Later at the meteor shower viewing, Dell is muttering to himself before he awkwardly attempts to approach Kimberly. He insists he is not going to ask her out as he does not believe in love. When she asks him for a reason why she should give him a chance, he reveals that when he was talking to himself earlier, he was saying "Don't miss her", as he is always afraid he is going to miss the important things in life. Dell constantly worries about what could happen in five minutes, while Kimberly prefers to live in the moment. She eventually agrees to try out a relationship with him.

Two years later, Dell and Kimberly are in a hotel room preparing to attend her friend's wedding in Paris, where their relationship becomes increasingly strained. As he hides an engagement ring in his pocket, she tells him that when he says he loves her, it never sounds genuine. She later deduces that he is hiding something from her. To assuage Kimberly, Dell declares that knowing her is the best thing that has happened to him, and says it is mostly because she likes him. As he turns to retrieve the ring, she tells him that he was almost successful and storms off.

One year after their breakup, Dell runs into Kimberly at a train station, claiming he is on his way to meet a woman, and they board the same train heading north. During the train ride, he apologizes for the way he treated her while they were together. As Kimberly grows to trust Dell again, he is asked by a conductor to disembark at the next stop for punching a bathroom mirror earlier. Dell admits that he is actually stalking Kimberly in an attempt to win her back. Though she is initially upset, he convinces her to get off at the next stop with him so they can talk.

Some time later, having rekindled their relationship, Dell calls Kimberly from New York City. During their phone conversation, she eventually confesses that she has been texting Jack, the man she had briefly dated after their first breakup, over the past month. Following a heated argument, Dell breaks up with Kimberly, claiming to have never loved her. Shortly afterwards, a nurse calls Dell to inform him that his mother, whom he had saved from a nearly fatal liver cancer four years earlier using an experimental drug, has died from a heart attack.

Six years after they first met, Dell finally agrees to meet with Kimberly in her apartment for the first time since their second, over-the-phone breakup. He correctly guesses that she is engaged to Jack, after seeing a framed photo of them together and noticing that she been fidgeting with her ring finger. After they go up to the rooftop, Dell proclaims that he wants Kimberly back and urges her not to marry Jack. Kimberly reveals she is pregnant and says that although she is grateful for the relationship she had with Dell, she loves Jack. Dell says he does not belong in a world where they do not end up together. After a brief moment of silence, Dell leans in to kiss Kimberly.

== Cast ==
- Emmy Rossum as Kimberly
- Justin Long as Dell
- Kayla Servi as Stephanie
- Eric Winter as Josh

== Production ==
Emmy Rossum and Justin Long joined the cast of the film in early June 2013 to play the lead roles.

=== Filming ===
Filming began in mid-June 2013 in the Los Angeles area.

== Release ==
The film had its world premiere at the LA Film Festival on June 13, 2014. The film went on to screen at the Twin Cities Film Fest on October 22, 2014. on October 28, 2014, it was announced IFC Films had acquired all distribution rights to the film. The film was released on December 5, 2014, in a limited release and through video on demand.

== Reception ==
Comet has an approval rating of 44% on review aggregator website Rotten Tomatoes, based on 32 reviews, and an average rating of 5.3/10. Metacritic assigned the film a weighted average score of 52 out of 100, based on 13 critics, indicating "mixed or average" reviews.

Variety called it a "misfire" but praised the lead performances. /Film praised the film overall but criticized the main character Dell for bordering on pretentiousness, and also criticized the writing as being slightly indulgent.
