= Sam Esmail =

American screenwriter, director, and producer

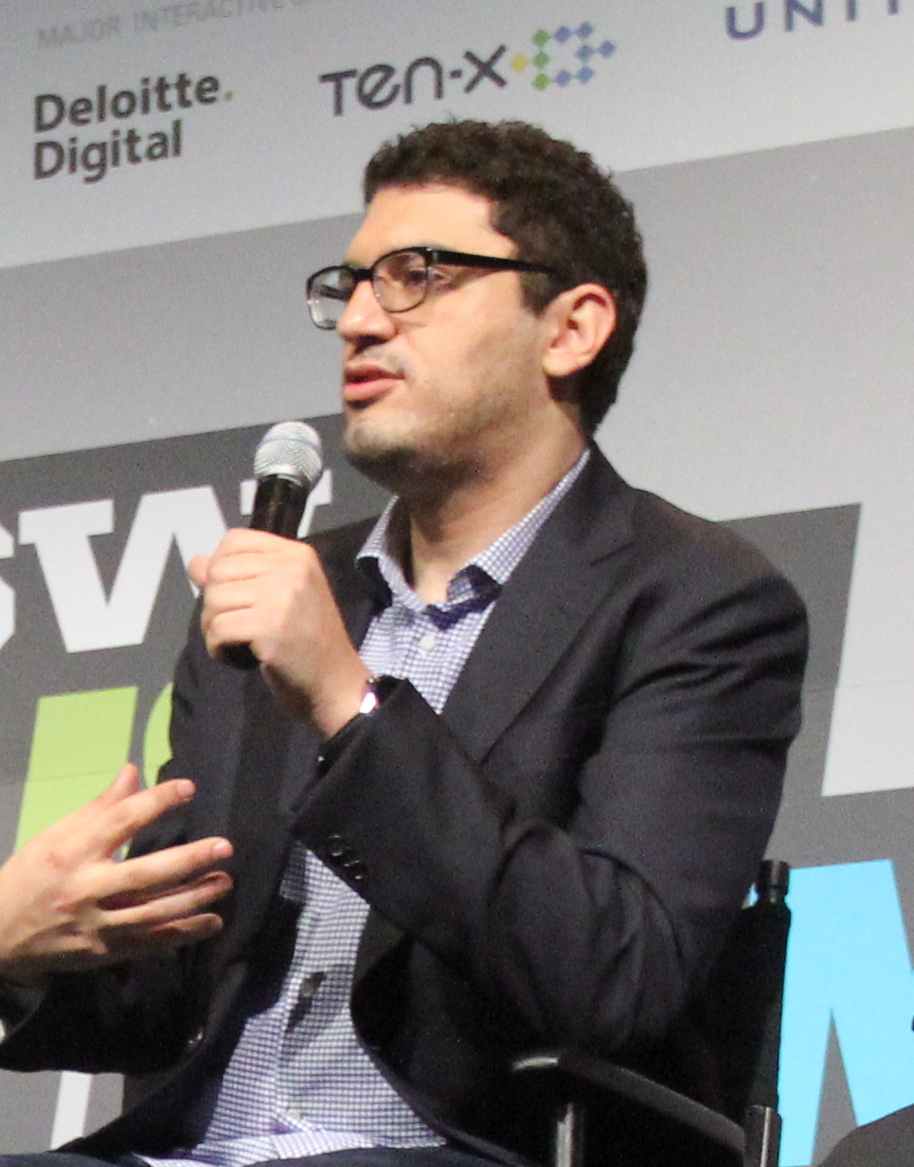
- Esmail in March 2016
- Born: September 17, 1977 (age 49); Hoboken, New Jersey, U.S.
- Education: New York University (BA); Dartmouth College; American Film Institute (MFA)
- Occupations: Director; producer; writer
- Years active: 2004–present
- Notable work: Mr. Robot; Homecoming; Comet
- Spouse: Emmy Rossum (m. 2017)
- Children: 2
- Relatives: Arthur P. Becker (cousin-in-law)

Sam Esmail (born September 17, 1977) is an American film and television producer, director, and screenwriter who runs the production company Esmail Corp. He is best known as the creator, writer, and director of the award-winning USA Network television series Mr. Robot (2015–2019), starring Rami Malek. He wrote and directed the feature films Comet (2014) and Leave the World Behind (2023). He produced and directed the first season of the acclaimed Amazon Prime Video psychological thriller Homecoming (2018–2020), starring Julia Roberts and Janelle Monáe, and produced USA's Briarpatch (2020), Starz's Gaslit (2022), and Peacock's Angelyne (2022) and The Resort (2022). Esmail's work often centers on the themes of alienation, technology, and American society.

== Early life and education ==
Esmail was born to Egyptian immigrant parents in Hoboken, New Jersey. He has described his parents as "very strict Muslims, and they weren't shy about showing it." He has an older sister and two younger brothers, including Samer Esmail who was a post-production coordinator for Mr. Robot and Homecoming.

When he was five years old, his family moved to South Carolina and then to Charlotte, North Carolina. As a child, Esmail was very interested in technology. He acquired his first computer when he was nine and began computer programming a few years later. He attended high school in Summerville, South Carolina, where he faced racism. He said, "I used to hold Stanley Kubrick film festivals at my house in high school. These are not cool things. Back in my day, those are things that you would get beaten up for ... When you're a funny-looking Egyptian growing up in Jersey and South Carolina, it kind of gets rough." The family eventually moved back to Sewell, New Jersey, where Esmail graduated from Washington Township High School in 1995.

Esmail attended New York University where he studied film and computer science. He graduated in 1998 from the university's Tisch School of the Arts. While attending the school, Esmail worked in its computer lab before being put on academic probation for hacking emails there.

After graduating he briefly worked for an internet start-up, before founding his own ISP software company called Portal Vision. At age 20, he raised US$6 million in venture capital funding during the dot-com boom but the software quickly became outdated when broadband internet began replacing dial-up. He left his position as president and chief technology officer to briefly attend Dartmouth College's creative writing program.

Esmail moved to Los Angeles in 2001 where he attended the AFI Conservatory. He graduated with a Master of Fine Arts in directing in 2004.

== Career ==
=== 2004–2014: Early career, Mockingbird and Comet ===
After graduating the AFI Conservatory in 2004, Esmail struggled to find work and held odd jobs. He worked as an assistant film editor for a few years and was eventually able to establish a career as a post-production supervisor of behind-the-scenes features and television specials; his work included helping to edit episodes of reality television shows for Lifetime and A&E and stand-up specials for Comedy Central, HBO's documentary series Tourgasm and HBO First Look, and "the making of" features for The Fast and the Furious franchise, as well as supervise the 2010 A&E documentary The Battle for Late Night.

When not working as a full-time editor, Esmail worked on writing screenplays. Frustrated with his career, Hollywood, and its films, Esmail began writing his own feature films. His screenplay, Sequels, Remakes & Adaptations landed on 2008's Black List, a yearly survey of over six hundred production companies and film executives of the "most liked" motion picture screenplays not yet produced.

Mockingbird

After this, he was able to find representation in Hollywood and began working more as a screenwriter; he wrote another screenplay that also landed on the Black List the following year and co-wrote the horror film Mockingbird with writer Bryan Bertino, which was released in 2014.

Comet

He wrote seriously for years before stopping to focus on his passion, directing. He began writing his own feature-length directorial debut, Comet, which was released by IFC Films in 2014. Comet premiered at the Los Angeles Film Festival and had a limited box office release.

=== 2014–2020: Mr. Robot, Homecoming and other series ===
Mr. Robot

Originally intending it as a follow-up feature film to Comet, Esmail began working on the technological thriller Mr. Robot in the late 2000s, inspired in part by the 2008 financial crisis and the Arab Spring. He has said that the main character, Elliot, is a "thinly-veiled version" of himself; like Elliot, Esmail also has social anxiety and is from Washington Township in New Jersey. He was later inspired to take what he had written and create a pilot for what he imagined would be a four-or-five season show. Having secured management from Anonymous Content, Esmail shopped his projects around to many different television networks and began developing the show with USA Network in 2014.

Mr. Robot premiered on the USA Network on June 24, 2015. Esmail is the creator, executive producer and head writer of the series. Beginning with season two, Esmail also directed all episodes of the show; in total he directed thirty-eight of its forty-five episodes. The first season of the show was critically acclaimed and Esmail himself was nominated for two Emmys, among other awards. The following three seasons of the show premiered in July 2016, October 2017, and October 2019, respectively.

In a 2015 interview, Esmail explained the influence of his experiences as a second-generation American on his work, saying, "I tend to write about alienated figures who can't connect with others and who are kind of distant from American culture. It's not something I am consciously doing but it's something that happens to be infused inside me because of my experience growing up in America." Following the wide recognition of Mr. Robot, Esmail formed his own production company, Esmail Corp.

In early 2017, Esmail was called on by Universal Pictures to produce a film centered around the Bermuda Triangle, but production has since not been carried through.

Homecoming

Esmail was one of the executive producers and director of the Amazon Video series Homecoming, starring Julia Roberts and Bobby Cannavale. He received strong reviews for his direction of the show, which premiered in November 2018.

Briarpatch

In 2018, Esmail worked on creating the television show Briarpatch with journalist and producer Andy Greenwald, who previously hosted the Mr. Robot aftershow Hacking Robot on USA. The show, which Esmail executive produced, was picked up by USA Network in 2019. The show was released in 2020 as well as the second season of Homecoming, which Esmail executive produced but did not direct like he had the first season.

In February 2019, it was announced that Esmail had signed his company to a four-year exclusive deal with Universal Content Productions with whom he had already produced Mr. Robot, Homecoming, and Briarpatch. Following this announcement, a number of projects in development were announced which would be sold and produced in the following few years.

Angelyne

In 2019, it was announced that Esmail was developing a limited series with Emmy Rossum for the NBCUniversal streaming service Peacock based on the Los Angeles pseudo-celebrity Angelyne. Produced during the first half of 2020, Angelyne was ultimately released May 19, 2022.

=== 2021–present: Career expansion ===
In September 2020, Esmail sold two dramas to ABC; in January 2021, a pilot was ordered for the first of those shows, Acts of Crime, but was not picked up by the network.

Gaslit

In February 2020, it was also announced that Esmail would be producing a new television series with Homecoming collaborator Julia Roberts based on the Slow Burn podcast's coverage of the Watergate scandal. Titled Gaslit, production began in Spring 2021 and it premiered on Starz in April 2022.

Leave the World Behind

Also in 2020, it was announced that Esmail would direct a film adaptation of the novel Leave the World Behind for Netflix starring Julia Roberts, Mahershala Ali, Ethan Hawke and Myha'la Herrold. Production began in April 2022, at which time Barack and Michelle Obama's Higher Ground Productions had joined the project as producers. Leave the World Behind released in 2023 to positive reviews from critics.

The Resort

In June 2021, it was announced that Peacock had picked up The Resort, a darkly comedic television series which features true crime stories that took place at resorts. First announced in 2020, Esmail, who serves as executive producer, developed the project with screenwriter Andy Siara. The eight episode series went into production in 2022, and premiered in July of that year.

In November 2021, Peacock announced that Esmail was also developing a series for the Battlestar Galactica franchise for NBCU with Michael Lesslie as showrunner. In July 2024, it was announced that the development of the series had been cancelled.

In March 2022, Apple ordered to series the television adaptation of the 1927 sci-fi classic Metropolis, to be written, directed, and produced by Esmail. The project was first revealed in 2016. On June 18, 2023, it was announced the project was cancelled.

In development

Since 2018, Esmail has been developing a film with Universal Pictures and Mr. Robot star Rami Malek based on the memoir American Radical: Inside the World of an Undercover Muslim FBI Agent by Tamer Elnoury and Kevin Maurer; the story centers on a Muslim FBI agent working for the agency post-9/11. Two years following the initial announcement, in September 2020, it was announced that screenwriter Nazrin Choudhury is attached to pen the film. As of 2019, Esmail and Malek were also working together on another undisclosed project.

In February 2020, it was announced that Esmail would develop one of the initial projects for Condé Nast's new Wired Studio; called Tell Tale Heart, his film is based on the 2019 Wired article of the same name. He began developing television series The American Throne with director Julius Onah in 2021. Other projects in various stages of pre-production include a miniseries based on an ensemble comedy False Alarm produced with Paul Feig, and a Coast Guard-centered procedural drama series titled So Others May Live. As of 2019, he is also producing a scripted podcast series for the UCP Audio network called This End Up.

== Personal life ==
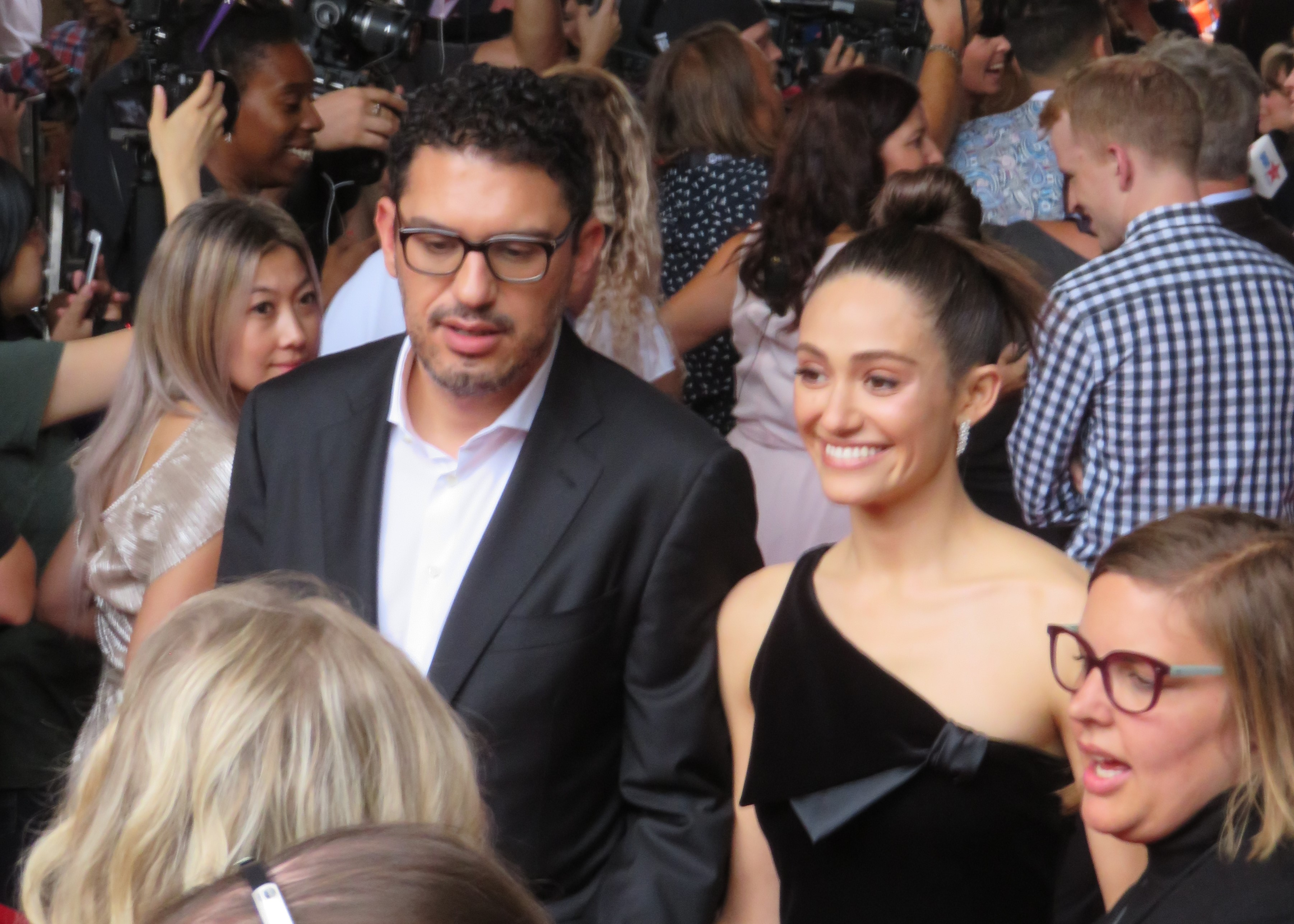
Esmail and his wife Emmy Rossum in 2018

In August 2015, Esmail became engaged to actress Emmy Rossum after dating for two years. He had directed her in his debut film, Comet. The two married on May 28, 2017, at the Central Synagogue in New York City. They have two children: a daughter (born May 2021) and a son (born April 2023).

Esmail is fluent in Arabic, notably giving part of his acceptance speech at the Golden Globes in the language.

Esmail has social anxiety disorder and credits his wife Rossum for helping him with it.

Esmail divides his time between New York City and Los Angeles.

== Filmography ==
=== Film ===
Short film

Year	Title	Director	Producer
2002	The Lobo Paramilitary Christmas Special	No	Yes
2004	Deep Down in Florida	Yes	No

Feature film

Year	Title	Director	Writer	Producer
2014	Comet	Yes	Yes	No
2014	Mockingbird	No	Story	No
2023	Leave the World Behind	Yes	Yes	Yes
2027	Panic Carefully	Yes	Yes	Yes
2027	The Hole	No	No	Yes
TBA	Famous	No	No	Yes

Executive producer

- Risk (2016)

=== Television ===
Year	Title	Director	Writer	Executive producer	Notes
2015–2019	Mr. Robot	Yes	Yes	Yes	Also creator, Directed 38 episodes, wrote 24 episodes
2018–2020	Homecoming	Yes	No	Yes	Directed 10 episodes
2020	Briarpatch	No	No	Yes	
2021	Acts of Crime	Yes	Yes	Yes	Unaired pilot
2022	Gaslit	No	No	Yes	Miniseries
2022	Angelyne	No	No	Yes	Miniseries
2022	The Resort	No	No	Yes	

Documentary

Year	Title	Role
2008–2009	HBO First Look	Post-production coordinator (3 episodes)
2010	The Battle for Late Night	Post-production supervisor

== Awards and nominations ==
Year	Association	Category	Nominated work	Result	Ref.
2014	Los Angeles Film Festival	Best Narrative Feature	Comet	Nominated	
2015	SXSW Film Audience Award	Audience Award for Best Episodic	Mr. Robot	Won	
2015	Gotham Independent Film Awards	Breakthrough Series – Long Form	Mr. Robot	Won	
2015	American Film Institute Awards	Television Programs of the Year	Mr. Robot	Won	
2016	Satellite Awards	Best Drama Series	Mr. Robot	Nominated	
2016	Writers Guild of America Awards	Best Drama Series	Mr. Robot	Nominated	
2016	Writers Guild of America Awards	Best New Series	Mr. Robot	Won	
2016	Golden Globe Awards	Best Television Series – Drama	Mr. Robot	Won	
2016	Critics' Choice Television Awards	Best Drama Series	Mr. Robot	Won	
2016	Primetime Emmy Awards	Outstanding Drama Series	Mr. Robot	Nominated	
2016	Primetime Emmy Awards	Outstanding Writing for a Drama Series	Mr. Robot	Nominated	
2019	Golden Globe Awards	Best Television Series – Drama	Homecoming	Nominated	
2019	Dorian Awards	TV Drama of the Year	Homecoming	Nominated	
2019	Critics' Choice Television Awards	Best Drama Series	Homecoming	Nominated	
2019	Satellite Awards	Best Television Series – Drama	Homecoming	Won	
2019	TCA Awards	Outstanding Achievement in Drama	Homecoming	Nominated	
2020	Writers Guild of America Awards	Best Episodic Drama	Mr. Robot	Nominated	
