= Angelyne (miniseries) =

2022 American drama television miniseries

- Promotional poster
- Genre: Drama
- Created by: Nancy Oliver
- Inspired by: Gary Baum's features from The Hollywood Reporter
- Developed by: Allison Miller
- Written by: Cara DiPaolo; Brendan Kelly; Andy Siara; Allison Miller
- Directed by: Matt Spicer; Lucy Tcherniak
- Starring: Emmy Rossum; Hamish Linklater; Philip Ettinger; Charlie Rowe; Alex Karpovsky; Martin Freeman; Molly Ephraim; Lukas Gage; Michael Angarano
- Composer: Jonathan Sadoff
- Country of origin: United States
- Original language: English
- No. of episodes: 5

Production
- Executive producers: Allison Miller; Sam Esmail; Chad Hamilton; Emmy Rossum; Lucy Tcherniak; Matthew Belloni
- Producers: Gregg Tilson; Jacqueline Rivera
- Cinematography: Doug Emmett; Tod Campbell
- Editors: Taichi Erskine; Sarah Beth Shapiro; Lauren Connelly; Henk Van Eeghen
- Running time: 42–52 minutes
- Production companies: Esmail Corp.; Anonymous Content; Composition 8; The Hollywood Reporter; Universal Content Productions

Original release
- Network: Peacock
- Release: May 19, 2022

Angelyne is an American drama television miniseries created by Nancy Oliver and starring Emmy Rossum as Angelyne. It premiered on Peacock on May 19, 2022.

== Premise ==
Angelyne is an enigmatic blonde bombshell who rose to fame in the 1980s with billboard advertisements featuring her image. In the 2010s, Jeff Glaser, a journalist for The Hollywood Reporter, is trying to uncover the true identity and life story of Angelyne. His efforts are hampered by her secrecy, her own conflicting accounts and of those who know her.

== Cast and characters ==
=== Main ===
- Emmy Rossum as Angelyne
- Hamish Linklater as Rick Krause, president of Angelyne's fan club (based on Scott Hennig)
- Philip Ettinger as Cory Hunt, guitarist of the band Baby Blue (based on Jordan Michaels)
- Charlie Rowe as Freddy Messina, keyboardist of Baby Blue and later Angelyne's photographer
- Alex Karpovsky as Jeff Glaser, a journalist for The Hollywood Reporter (based on Gary Baum)
- Martin Freeman as Harold Wallach, a printing mogul who backs Angelyne's billboard campaign (based on Hugo Maisnik)
- Molly Ephraim as Wendy Wallach, Harold's daughter (based on Katherine Saltzberg née Maisnik)
- Lukas Gage as Max Allen, a filmmaker working on a documentary about Angelyne (based on Jesse Small)
- Michael Angarano as Danny, Angelyne's ex-husband

=== Guest ===
- Antjuan Tobias as Bud Griffin, drummer of Baby Blue
- Rosanny Zayas as Glaser's assistant
- Kerry Norton as Edie Wallach, Harold's wife (based on Joy Maisnik)
- Tonatiuh as Andre Casiano, Angelyne's on-and-off assistant
- Toby Huss as Hugh Hefner, the founder and editor-in-chief of Playboy magazine
- Darryl Stephens as Pete, a tchotchke shop clerk
- David Krumholtz as Max Allen's lawyer
- Ian Fisher as Eli Goldman, Angelyne's father
- Hani Furstenberg as Bronis Goldberg, Angelyne's mother

In addition, Michael Shuman co-stars as Ray, bassist of Baby Blue.

== Episodes ==
No.	Title	Directed by	Written by	Original release date
1	"Dream Machine"	Matt Spicer	Cara DiPaolo & Brendan Kelly	May 19, 2022
In the early 1980s, Angelyne becomes a media sensation after billboards featuring her image appear across Los Angeles. In 2019, Angelyne is interviewed about a recent Hollywood Reporter article by Jeff Glaser, who claims to have uncovered Angelyne's real identity. In 2015, Jeff connects Angelyne to an old boyfriend, Cory Hunt, the former guitarist of punk rock band Baby Blue. After meeting Cory around 1977, Angelyne joins the band and reshapes its image around herself. Angelyne gets Baby Blue booked at the Whisky a Go Go, though their performance receives a negative review in the press. Cory buys Angelyne a Chevrolet Corvette and proposes marriage; she rejects his proposal but keeps the Corvette. In 1981, Cory achieves minor success with a solo cover version of "Wild Thing", and Angelyne breaks up with him after catching him cheating on her. Cory checks himself into rehab for drug abuse, where Angelyne visits him and they make amends. She gets breast implants and paints her Corvette pink. In 2015, Angelyne agrees to be interviewed by Jeff, hoping it will help her Indiegogo campaign to fund a new billboard.
2	"Gods and Fairies"	Lucy Tcherniak	Andy Siara	May 19, 2022
In 1982, Angelyne convinces Harold Wallach, the owner of a printing business, to finance her billboard campaign. Enthralled by Angelyne, Harold eventually becomes her manager while neglecting his wife Edie and 19-year-old daughter Wendy. Angelyne's billboards soon lead to offers such as a film audition and an interview with the Los Angeles Times. However, Angelyne complains to Harold that she was sexually harassed by a male casting director and that the LA Times interviewer did not ask any of the pre-approved questions. Wendy, an aspiring actress, is disappointed when her sitcom is canceled and grows frustrated with Angelyne's constant presence in Harold's life. In 1984, Wendy confronts Angelyne, telling her to stay away from her father. Around 2001, Wendy, pregnant with her first child, has a pleasant encounter with Angelyne. Realizing that Angelyne was never a threat to her, Wendy writes, directs, and stars in Los Angelyne, a one-woman show about her own experience growing up in the shadow of Angelyne's billboards.
3	"Glow in the Dark Queen of the Universe"	Lucy Tcherniak	Andy Siara	May 19, 2022
In 1984, Angelyne meets portrait illustrator Rick Krause, a self-proclaimed fan, and subsequently hires him as her full-time office manager. In 1987, as Angelyne's star continues to rise, she refuses Hugh Hefner's offer to pose nude for Playboy. Angelyne receives an unexpected visit from her ex-husband Danny Katz, who calls her Rachel and attempts to drop off some of her personal belongings, such as high school photos and their wedding photos, but she rebuffs him. In 2015, when Jeff becomes frustrated with Angelyne's secrecy and conflicting accounts of her childhood, she takes him to an extravagant party so he can better understand her essence. Jeff ultimately writes a "vibe piece" that helps Angelyne obtain her billboard. In 2017, a hobbyist genealogist who claims to work at a government agency hands Jeff a folder containing information on Angelyne. In 2019, aspiring documentarian Max Allen, who started making a documentary about Angelyne in 2012, claims to be the first person to discover the whole truth about her.
4	"The Tease"	Matt Spicer	Brendan Kelly & Allison Miller	May 19, 2022
In 2012, Angelyne agrees to be the subject of Max's documentary, though she refuses to let him interview anyone important. In 2013, Max argues with Angelyne when she fails to keep her promise to arrange an interview with Harold. Max eventually tracks down Harold at a retirement home; Harold reveals that his partnership with Angelyne ended after he retired in 1993. In 2014, the genealogist hands Max a folder containing information on Angelyne after 1978. After Angelyne learns of Max's investigation into her, they become involved in an arbitration hearing in 2017. Having obtained Angelyne's birth certificate, Max divulges that her real name is Rachel Goldman, she was born in Poland to Holocaust survivors, and after her family settled in California, she was married to Danny for less than a year. Max is allowed to complete his documentary so long as Angelyne agrees to participate, which she does not. Jeff calls to tell Angelyne that The Hollywood Reporter is going to run another story on her, revealing her real identity, which upsets her.
5	"Pink Clouds"	Matt Spicer	Allison Miller	May 19, 2022
In 2017, when Jeff's Hollywood Reporter article is published, Angelyne is forced to confront her past as Rachel. As a child, Rachel immigrates to the United States with her Polish-Jewish parents, Eli and Bronis, and younger sister Leah. After Bronis dies, Eli remarries another Holocaust survivor named Leora when Rachel is 15. While in high school, Rachel begins dating Danny, often sneaking out to see him. When Eli and Leora catch Rachel sneaking out, Leora locks her in a closet as punishment. In 1968, Rachel marries Danny to escape her family, though they divorce within a year. In a fantasy sequence, Rachel finds herself on a pink planet and, entering a flamboyant apartment, meets Angelyne in a pink control room; while Rachel watches various clips of Angelyne on screens, Angelyne travels in a spaceship and lands in 1981 Los Angeles near a billboard, which she replaces with her own billboard. In 2017, Angelyne receives calls from people expressing support for her. In 2019, she declares that her mystery will never be solved.

== Reception ==
The review aggregator website Rotten Tomatoes reported an 86% approval rating based on 21 critic reviews, with an average rating of 8.7/10. The website's critics consensus reads, "Emmy Rossum brings remarkable depth to a cipher in Angelyne, a glitzy look at fame for fame's sake where the inscrutability is the point." Metacritic, which uses a weighted average, assigned a score of 74 out of 100 based on 15 critic reviews, indicating "generally favorable reviews".

=== Awards and nominations ===
Year	Award	Category	Nominee(s)	Result	Ref.
2022	Primetime Creative Arts Emmy Awards	Outstanding Period Costumes	Danny Glicker, Jessica Fasman, and Adam Giradet (for "Glow in the Dark Queen of the Universe")	Nominated	
2022	Primetime Creative Arts Emmy Awards	Outstanding Contemporary Makeup (Non-Prosthetic)	David Williams, Ron Pipes, Erin LeBre, Anne Pala Williams, and Mara Rouse (for "The Tease")	Nominated	
2022	Primetime Creative Arts Emmy Awards	Outstanding Prosthetic Makeup	Vincent Van Dyke, Kate Biscoe, Mike Mekash, Abby Lyle Clawson, and Chris Burgoyne	Nominated	
2023	Make-Up Artists and Hair Stylists Guild Awards	Best Special Make-Up Effects in a Television Series, Television Limited or Miniseries or Television New Media Series	Vincent Van Dyke, Kate Biscoe, Mike Mekash, Abby Lyle Clawson	Nominated	
