= List of awards and nominations received by J. K. Simmons =

J.K. Simmons awards and nominations
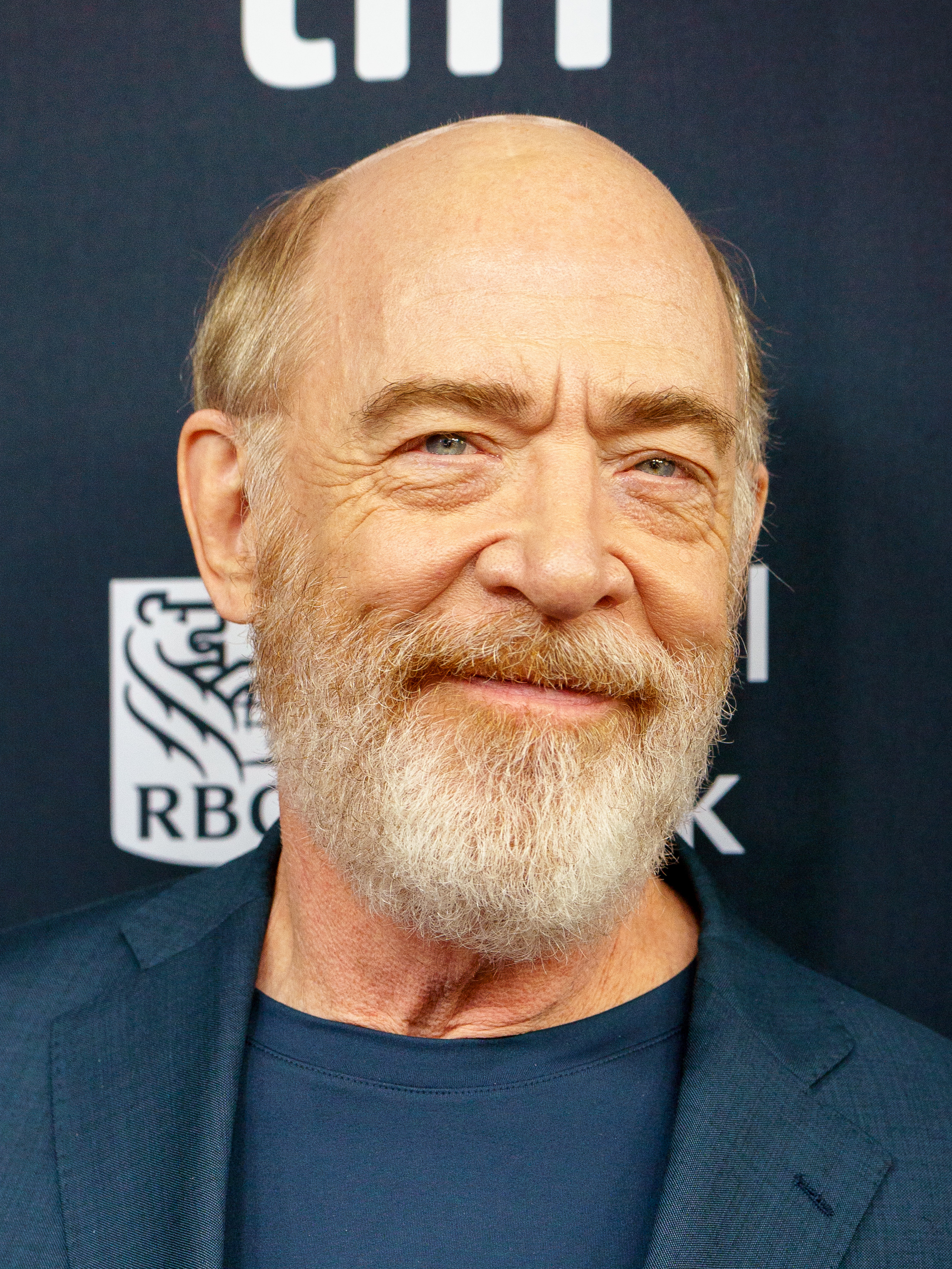
- Simmons at the TIFF in 2024
Awards and nominations
Award	Wins	Nominations
Academy Awards	1	2
Actor Awards	1	6
BAFTA Awards	1	1
Critics' Choice Awards	1	4
Emmy Awards	0	1
Golden Globe Awards	1	1

Totals (Note: Certain award groups do not simply award one winner. They acknowledge several different recipients, have runners-up, and have third place. Since this is a specific recognition and is different from losing an award, runner-up mentions are considered wins in this award tally. For simplification and to avoid errors, each award in this list has been presumed to have had a prior nomination.)
- Wins: 37
- Nominations: 58

This is a list of awards and nominations that was received by J.K. Simmons.

J. K. Simmons is an American actor. He is known for his extensive character actor roles in film, television and theater. He has received various accolades including an Academy Award, a British Academy Film Award, a Critics' Choice Movie Award, a Golden Globe Award, an Independent Spirit Award and a Screen Actors Guild Award as well as a nomination for a Primetime Emmy Award.

For his role as an imperious and demanding jazz professor and conductor Terrence Fletcher in the Damien Chazelle psychological drama Whiplash (2014), he received widespread critical acclaim and earned him 40 accolades, including the Academy Award, the BAFTA Award, the Critics' Choice Movie Award, the Golden Globe Award, Independent Spirit Award and the Screen Actors Guild Award for Best Supporting Actor. He portrayed William Frawley from the sitcom I Love Lucy in Aaron Sorkin directed showbiz drama Being the Ricardos (2021) which earned him his second nomination for the Academy Award for Best Supporting Actor and the Critics' Choice Movie Award for Best Supporting Actor.

On television, he received five nominations for the Screen Actors Guild Award for Outstanding Performance by an Ensemble in a Drama Series as part of the ensemble of the TNT police procedural The Closer (2005–2012). He was nominated for the Primetime Emmy Award for Outstanding Performer in a Short Form Comedy or Drama Series for the action adventure series Die Hart: Hart to Kill (2025). On stage, he acted in the Jim Luigs opera parody Das Barbecu (1995) for which he was nominated for the Drama Desk Award for Outstanding Actor in a Musical.

== Major associations ==
=== Academy Awards ===
Year	Category	Nominated work	Result	Ref.
2014	Best Supporting Actor	Whiplash	Won	
2021	Best Supporting Actor	Being the Ricardos	Nominated	

=== Actor Awards ===
Year	Category	Nominated work	Result	Ref.
2005	Outstanding Ensemble in a Drama Series	The Closer	Nominated	
2007	Outstanding Ensemble in a Drama Series	The Closer	Nominated	
2008	Outstanding Ensemble in a Drama Series	The Closer	Nominated	
2009	Outstanding Ensemble in a Drama Series	The Closer	Nominated	
2010	Outstanding Ensemble in a Drama Series	The Closer	Nominated	
2014	Outstanding Actor in a Supporting Role	Whiplash	Won	

=== BAFTA Awards ===
Year	Category	Nominated work	Result	Ref.
British Academy Film Awards
2014	Best Actor in a Supporting Role	Whiplash	Won	

=== Critics' Choice Awards ===
Year	Category	Nominated work	Result	Ref.
Critics' Choice Movie Awards
2007	Best Cast	Juno	Nominated	
2009	Best Cast	Up in the Air	Nominated	
2014	Best Supporting Actor	Whiplash	Won	
2021	Best Supporting Actor	Being the Ricardos	Nominated	

=== Emmy Awards ===
Year	Category	Nominated work	Result	Ref.
Primetime Emmy Awards
2025	Outstanding Performer in a Short Form Series	Die Hart: Hart To Kill	Nominated	

=== Golden Globe Awards ===
Year	Category	Nominated work	Result	Ref.
2014	Best Supporting Actor – Motion Picture	Whiplash	Won	

== Miscellaneous awards ==
Organizations	Year	Category	Work	Result	Ref.
Australian Academy Film Awards	2015	Best International Supporting Actor	Whiplash	Won	
Alliance of Women Film Journalists	2015	Best Supporting Actor	Whiplash	Won	
Drama Desk Awards	1995	Outstanding Actor in a Musical	Das Barbecü	Nominated	
Independent Spirit Awards	2014	Best Supporting Male	Whiplash	Won	
MTV Movie Awards	2015	Best Villain	Whiplash	Nominated	
Palm Springs International Film Festival	2014	Spotlight Award	Whiplash	Won	
Santa Barbara International Film Festival	2015	Virtuoso Award	Whiplash	Won	
Satellite Awards	2015	Best Supporting Actor – Motion Picture	Whiplash	Won	
Satellite Awards	2019	Best Actor – Television Series Drama	Counterpart	Nominated	
Satellite Awards	2022	Best Supporting Actor – Motion Picture	Being the Ricardos	Nominated	
Saturn Awards	2015	Best Supporting Actor	Whiplash	Nominated	
Village Voice	2014	Best Supporting Actor	Whiplash	Won	

== Critics associations ==
Year	Association	Category	Nominated work	Result	Ref.
2009	Denver Film Critics Society	Best Acting Ensemble	I Love You, Man	Nominated	
2009	Denver Film Critics Society	Best Acting Ensemble	Up in the Air	Nominated	
2009	Washington D.C. Area Film Critics Association	Best Ensemble	Up in the Air	Nominated	
2014	African-American Film Critics Association	Best Supporting Actor	Whiplash	Won	
2014	Austin Film Critics Association	Best Supporting Actor	Whiplash	Won	
2014	Boston Society of Film Critics	Best Supporting Actor	Whiplash	Won	
2014	Chicago Film Critics Association	Best Supporting Actor	Whiplash	Won	
2014	Dallas–Fort Worth Film Critics Association	Best Supporting Actor	Whiplash	Won	
2014	Detroit Film Critics Society	Best Supporting Actor	Whiplash	Won	
2014	Florida Film Critics Circle	Best Supporting Actor	Whiplash	Won	
2014	Houston Film Critics Society	Best Supporting Actor	Whiplash	Won	
2014	Las Vegas Film Critics Society	Best Supporting Actor	Whiplash	Won	
2014	London Film Critics' Circle	Supporting Actor of the Year	Whiplash	Won	
2014	Los Angeles Film Critics Association	Best Supporting Actor	Whiplash	Won	
2014	New York Film Critics Circle	Best Supporting Actor	Whiplash	Won	
2014	New York Film Critics Online	Best Supporting Actor	Whiplash	Won	
2014	Phoenix Film Critics Society	Best Supporting Actor	Whiplash	Won	
2014	San Diego Film Critics Society	Best Supporting Actor	Whiplash	Nominated	
2014	San Francisco Film Critics Circle	Best Supporting Actor	Whiplash	Nominated	
2014	Southeastern Film Critics Association	Best Supporting Actor	Whiplash	Won	
2014	St. Louis Gateway Film Critics Association	Best Supporting Actor	Whiplash	Won	
2014	Toronto Film Critics Association	Best Supporting Actor	Whiplash	Won	
2014	Utah Film Critics Association	Best Supporting Actor	Whiplash	Won	
2014	Washington D.C. Area Film Critics Association	Best Supporting Actor	Whiplash	Won	
2015	Denver Film Critics Society	Best Supporting Actor	Whiplash	Won	
2015	Georgia Film Critics Association	Best Supporting Actor	Whiplash	Won	
2015	Iowa Film Critics	Best Supporting Actor	Whiplash	Won	
2015	National Society of Film Critics	Best Supporting Actor	Whiplash	Won	
2015	North Texas Film Critics Association	Best Supporting Actor	Whiplash	Won	
2015	Online Film Critics Society	Best Supporting Actor	Whiplash	Nominated	
2015	Vancouver Film Critics Circle	Best Supporting Actor	Whiplash	Won	
