= Brothers (2024 film) =

2024 film by Max Barbakow

- Release poster
- Directed by: Max Barbakow
- Screenplay by: Macon Blair
- Story by: Etan Cohen
- Produced by: Andrew Lazar; Josh Brolin; Peter Dinklage; David Ginsberg
- Starring: Josh Brolin; Peter Dinklage; Taylour Paige; M. Emmet Walsh; Jennifer Landon; Brendan Fraser; Glenn Close; Marisa Tomei
- Cinematography: Quyen Tran
- Edited by: Christian Hoffman; Martin Pensa
- Music by: Rupert Gregson-Williams
- Production companies: Legendary Entertainment; Mad Chance Productions; JB Productions; Estuary Films
- Distributed by: Amazon MGM Studios
- Release date: October 10, 2024
- Running time: 89 minutes
- Country: United States
- Language: English

Brothers is a 2024 American crime comedy film directed by Max Barbakow with a screenplay by Macon Blair from a story by Etan Cohen. The film stars Josh Brolin, Peter Dinklage, Taylour Paige, M. Emmet Walsh, Marisa Tomei, Jennifer Landon, Brendan Fraser, and Glenn Close.

Produced by Legendary Entertainment, the film was released in the United States by Amazon MGM Studios in select theaters on October 10, 2024, before debuting on Amazon Prime Video a week later on October 17.

== Plot ==
Two brothers - Moke and JD - rob a warehouse, but only JD gets caught and spends time in prison. While inside, he meets up and strikes deals with an Officer Farful.

Moke is working at a restaurant, but is fired because he didn't disclose his criminal past. His wife is pregnant.

Farful beats JD up at his place, and threatens him for the emeralds, but doesn't find them. The brothers decide to go on a road trip for the emeralds. The brothers visit Bethesda, an environmentalist JD met online. They find an Orangutan there smoking a cigarette and decide to leave.

They go to a hotel, and find their mom there who abandoned them 30 years earlier for a heist. She talks about how she evaded the police many years ago when her partner Glen swallowed some emeralds before dying of a heart condition. She buried him in an undisclosed location and got out of the country and remained on the run until re-connecting with JD while he was incarcerated. She claims to be dying, with less than a year to live. They agree on one last heist to acquire the buried emeralds, now worth an estimated $4 million.

Meanwhile, Officer Farful tracks JD to Bethesda's place using the GPS in his phone given to him to stay in touch by Farful and she tells him about the brothers.

The mom and sons get an excavator and go to the plot to dig up the body of her crime partner Glen who died with emeralds in his stomach. They get the emeralds but are spotted by golf players, but manage to get away. They bury the body again in a different location, and Moke discovers that JD impersonated the "Labor and Employment Bureau" to get him fired from his job. The brothers fight, but Farful arrives with a gun and asks for the emeralds. The mom runs away with the emeralds and they all chase her, but she gets into a car and drives away. Farful drives a car with the brothers in the back seat, but the brothers get into another fight and a random kick knocks Farful unconscious.

The mom sells the emeralds for cash, but the brothers are able to locate her and demand their share of the loot. She runs to an abandoned mall with her sons in pursuit. Farful appears there with a gun and is able to secure the bag of cash, but when he opens the bag, a container of pepper spray planted by JD shoots him in his eyes. As he fires more shots in agony, a Christmas tree falls on him. Hearing the gunshots, the mall is surrounded with cops. The mom takes the gun and asks her sons to flee, and confesses that she's not actually dying.

At Judge Farful's house, Moke gives the judge his share of cash in return for his brother's gun with incriminating fingerprints.

Moke has Thanksgiving dinner with his family, and is joined by JD, who says he has seen a lawyer and created a trust under Moke's daughter's name for $2 million.

A year later, the brothers go to see their mother in jail, where she gets to see her new granddaughter Blueberry. The brothers go outside, and JD opens his hand to reveal two emeralds, as it shows mom had secretly swallowed them just before being arrested.

In the final narration, JD reveals there were actually 3 emeralds, and he kept one extra.

== Cast ==
- Josh Brolin as Moke Munger
- Peter Dinklage as JD Munger
- Taylour Paige as Abby Jacobson Munger
- M. Emmet Walsh as Judge Farful
- Brendan Fraser as Farful
- Glenn Close as Cath Munger
  - Jennifer Landon as young Cath
- Marisa Tomei as Bethesda

== Production ==
On February 28, 2019, it was announced that Legendary Entertainment had purchased the project in a competitive bidding war, with Etan Cohen set to write the screenplay. Josh Brolin and Peter Dinklage were attached to star in the film as well as produce alongside Andrew Lazar. The film was said to be tonally in the vein of Twins (1988), which centered on two unlikely twins played by Arnold Schwarzenegger and Danny DeVito. Macon Blair was later attached to direct the film and co-write the script with Cohen on April 30, 2020. In June 2021, Glenn Close joined the main cast, with Max Barbakow directing. Two months later, Brendan Fraser and Taylour Paige were added to the main cast. Principal photography took place in August 2021 in Atlanta.

== Release ==
In October 2023, Amazon MGM Studios acquired distribution rights to the film. The film was released in select theaters in the United States on October 10, 2024, before debuting on Amazon Prime Video on October 17, 2024.

== Reception ==
On the review aggregator website Rotten Tomatoes, 44% of 25 critics' reviews are positive. Metacritic, which uses a weighted average, assigned the film a score of 50 out of 100, based on 10 critics, indicating "mixed or average" reviews.

In The Hollywood Reporter, Justin Lowe offered, "for a movie that aspires to antic comedy, it brings way too much casting firepower to a slim plot and even sketchier character development."

Matt Zoller Seitz of RogerEbert.com wrote "Barbakow seems to have a gift for letting performers roam around inside the fiction and supply their own moments of invention but reeling them in whenever they are about to get too “big” or uncontrolled and break the spell... There's a special art to editing madcap comedies filled with big personalities, and editors Christian Hoffman and Martin Pensa have mastered it."

Added William Babiani of TheWrap: “Brothers” takes a tediously familiar comedy story structure and hangs some genuinely interesting characters and performances on it. It's like a Frankenstein monster made out of “Raising Arizona” and “Dumb and Dumber To.”

From the The New York Times' Brandon Yu: "There’s the slapstick violence; there’s a sexually excited orangutan named Samuel; there’s Glenn Close as a two-bit criminal scaring a naked Josh Brolin off a motel balcony. But one is ultimately left with the prevailing feeling that this comedy is not particularly bad, but rather just fine."
