= Andy Siara =

American screenwriter

Andy Siara is an American screenwriter. He created and served as the showrunner of the Peacock series The Resort (2022). Siara was a film student at the American Film Institute where in his second year he wrote the screenplay of Palm Springs. He has been married since 2015.

== Filmography ==
=== As writer ===
- Merrimaker (2013; short film)
- Nurples (2014; short film)
- Anxiety (2014; short film)
- The Duke: Based on the Memoir 'I'm the Duke' by J.P. Duke (2016; short film)
- Grill Dog (2016; short film)
- Lodge 49 (2019; TV series)
- Palm Springs (2020; feature film)
- Angelyne (2022; miniseries)
- The Resort (2022; creator/showrunner)
- Gatto (2027; feature film)

=== As producer ===
- Angelyne (2022; as co-producer)
- The Resort (2022; as executive producer)

=== As actor ===
- Timer (2009; as Zuckerman)
