= Palm Springs (2020 film) =

American film by Max Barbakow

- Release poster
- Directed by: Max Barbakow
- Screenplay by: Andy Siara
- Story by: Max Barbakow; Andy Siara
- Produced by: Andy Samberg; Akiva Schaffer; Becky Sloviter; Jorma Taccone; Chris Parker; Dylan Sellers
- Starring: Andy Samberg; Cristin Milioti; J. K. Simmons
- Cinematography: Quyen Tran
- Edited by: Matthew Friedman; Andrew Dickler
- Music by: Matthew Compton
- Production companies: Limelight Productions; Lonely Island Classics; Sun Entertainment
- Distributed by: Hulu; Neon
- Release dates: January 26, 2020 (Sundance); July 10, 2020 (United States)
- Running time: 90 minutes
- Country: United States
- Language: English
- Budget: $5 million
- Box office: $1.5 million

Palm Springs is a 2020 American science fiction romantic comedy film directed by Max Barbakow (in his feature directorial debut) from a screenplay by Andy Siara, based on a story they developed. Starring Andy Samberg (who also produced the film), Cristin Milioti, and J. K. Simmons, it focuses on two strangers who meet at a wedding in Palm Springs only to find themselves stuck in a time loop.

Palm Springs premiered at the 2020 Sundance Film Festival on January 26, and it was simultaneously released on Hulu and in select theaters by Neon on July 10, 2020. The film received critical acclaim for its use of the concept and cast performances. At the 78th Golden Globe Awards, it earned two nominations: Best Motion Picture – Musical or Comedy and Best Actor in a Motion Picture – Musical or Comedy for Samberg. Among other accolades, it won Best Comedy at the 26th Critics' Choice Awards.

== Plot ==
On November 9, in Palm Springs, Nyles wakes up and fails to consummate sex with his girlfriend Misty. That evening, Nyles attends a wedding reception for Tala and Abe. There, he bonds with the maid of honor, Tala's depressed half-sister Sarah.

Nyles and Sarah leave the party to have sex in the nearby desert. As he undresses, Nyles is hit by an arrow shot by an assailant, then he crawls into a cave, warning Sarah not to follow him. Concerned for Nyles, she follows him and is sucked into a vortex.

Sarah wakes up and realizes that it is November 9 again. She confronts Nyles, and he explains that by following him into the cave, Sarah has become stuck in a time loop with him; falling asleep or dying resets the loop, repeating November 9. Nyles reveals that the man who shot him, Roy, is from the wedding and that Nyles inadvertently trapped him in the time loop.

For revenge, Roy sometimes hunts down Nyles, as he enjoys putting him through pain even though his "deaths" are only temporary. Sarah tries various methods to escape the loop, but is unsuccessful. Nyles, having already been in the loop for a long time, has become complacent and carefree, abandoning hope of escape.

Sarah resigns herself to her fate and adopts Nyles' carefree and reckless lifestyle. Nyles and Sarah become close. They begin to look forward to their days together, where they are free to do anything without consequence.

One night, Nyles and Sarah camp out in the desert, get high, and have sex. The day after, Sarah sleeps in and is woken up by Abe, with whom she had sex on November 8, the night before the wedding. Guilt-ridden, Sarah refuses to talk to Nyles about their previous night, expressing nihilism about their life in the loop.

After being pulled over by Roy disguised as a cop, Sarah runs him over. She and Nyles argue, leading him to admit that he had sex with Sarah many times in the loop, something he previously lied about. An angry Sarah starts avoiding Nyles.

Nyles feels lost without Sarah and spends days aimlessly moping, discovering Abe and Sarah's affair in the process. One day, Nyles visits Roy at his home in Irvine. Having now experienced a painful injury at the hands of Sarah, Roy realizes what he has put Nyles through, and they reconcile.

Meanwhile, Sarah spends her days studying to become an expert in quantum physics and general relativity. After some experimentation, she believes that exploding oneself in the cave will break the time loop. Sarah offers Nyles a chance to escape with her, but he confesses his love for her and asks if they can stay in the loop together forever. She refuses, resolved to try her escape plan without him.

Sarah attends the wedding one last time, giving a heartfelt speech to Tala, and then travels to the cave with explosives. Nyles has a change of heart, and rushes to the cave to leave with her. He declares that he would rather die with her in an explosion than remain in the loop alone. Sarah reciprocates his feelings, and they kiss in the cave, as she presses the detonator.

The two then relax in the pool of a nearby house, which Nyles had shown Sarah during one of their loops. The residents return and catch them there, which seems to indicate that the plan has worked and it is now November 10.

In a mid-credits scene, Roy, having gotten a voicemail from Sarah explaining her plan to escape the loop, returns to the wedding and asks Nyles if the plan would work. Nyles does not recognize Roy, who smiles, realizing that Nyles is out of the time loop.

== Cast ==
- Andy Samberg as Nyles, Misty's boyfriend
- Cristin Milioti as Sarah Wilder, half-sister of the bride
- J. K. Simmons as Roy Schlieffen, Nyles's enemy
- Meredith Hagner as Misty, a bridesmaid and Nyles's girlfriend
- Camila Mendes as Tala Anne Wilder, the bride
- Tyler Hoechlin as Abraham Eugene Trent "Abe" Schlieffen, the groom
- Peter Gallagher as Howard Wilder, Sarah's and Tala's father
- Jacqueline Obradors as Pia Wilder, Sarah's stepmother and Tala's mother
- Chris Pang as Trevor, the wedding celebrant
- Tongayi Chirisa as Jerry Schlieffen, a groomsman
- Conner O'Malley as Randy, a groomsman
- June Squibb as Nana Schlieffen, the groom's grandmother
- Jena Friedman as Daisy the Bartender
- Martin Kildare as Ted the Bartender
- Dale Dickey as Darla, a woman in a bar
- Brian Duffy as Spuds, the gun range owner
- Clifford V. Johnson as Professor

== Production ==
Director Max Barbakow and screenwriter Andy Siara came up with the film's concept as students at the American Film Institute, "with an equal eye on Jungian philosophical ideas and the pragmatic importance of writing a small-budget film that would be easy to produce." They envisioned the script as "an absurdist comedic mumblecore take on Leaving Las Vegas, centered on a despondent thirtysomething who travels to Palm Springs to kill himself, only to slowly rediscover a sense of meaning in his life." When Siara went on to write for the television series Lodge 49, they redeveloped the script into a more ambitious project with a science fiction edge. While Groundhog Day (1993) was a fundamentally important starting point for the use of a time loop in a romantic comedy, Barbakow and Siara knew they needed to distance their script from that film. This led to Palm Springs beginning with Nyles already in the time loop, making the film feel like "a sequel to a movie that doesn't exist" according to Siara, and then adding Sarah as a second character within the loop to serve as a point of navigation for the viewer.

The project was announced in November 2018 after it secured a tax credit to film in California; however, given the limitations of that tax credit, they were forced to film in the Los Angeles area rather than Palm Springs. Andy Samberg was announced as starring in the film. In March 2019, Cristin Milioti and J. K. Simmons joined the cast. Camila Mendes was added in April.

Filming began in April 2019 and lasted for 21 days. Shots feature the Cabazon Dinosaurs.

== Release ==
Palm Springs had its world premiere at the Sundance Film Festival on January 26, 2020. Shortly after, Neon and Hulu acquired distribution rights to the film. Neon and Hulu reportedly paid $17,500,000.69 for the film, breaking the previous record for the highest sale of a film from Sundance by $0.69. Later reports put the deal closer to $22 million after guarantees were factored in.

The film was released in the United States digitally on Hulu and in select drive-in theaters on July 10, 2020. Hulu stated that the film also set the opening weekend record by "netting more hours watched over its first three days than any other film" in the platform's history. In August 2020, it was reported that 8.1 percent of subscribers had watched the film over its first month. In November, Variety reported the film was the 26th-most watched straight-to-streaming title of 2020 up to that point.

In January 2021, a commentary cut of the film featuring Samberg, Milioti, Barbakow, and Siara was released; Hulu stated it was the first such release by a streaming service.

== Reception ==
=== Box office ===
Palm Springs grossed $164,000 from 66 theaters in its opening weekend. It played in about 30 theaters in its second weekend and made $101,000.

=== Critical response ===
Palm Springs was met with critical acclaim. On Rotten Tomatoes, the film has an approval rating of 94% based on 251 reviews, with an average rating of 8/10. The website's critics consensus reads, "Strong performances, assured direction, and a refreshingly original concept make Palm Springs a romcom that's easy to fall in love with." On Metacritic the film has a weighted average score of 83 out of 100, based on 42 critics, indicating "universal acclaim".

Writing for IndieWire, David Ehrlich gave the film a grade B+ and praised the film for cleverly reworking the Groundhog Day formula: "The movie always seems on the brink of biting off more than a super energetic 90-minute comedy can chew, and the sheer momentum of the storytelling doesn't give the story time to slow down." Peter Debruge of Variety gave the film a positive review and wrote: "Palm Springs is to time-loop movies as Zombieland was to the undead genre: It's an irreverent take on a form where earlier iterations were obliged to take themselves seriously." Vince Mancini of Uproxx gave the film a positive review, saying: "Palm Springs is the perfect kind of art-comedy. It comes on like a brilliantly silly little lark and eventually lands on you like a ton of bricks."

Metacritic summarized various critics' end-of-year top lists, and ranked Palm Springs in 12th place overall. IGN named the film their Best Movie of the Year 2020.

=== Accolades ===
Award	Date of ceremony	Category	Recipient(s)	Result	Ref.
ACE Eddie Awards	April 17, 2021	Best Edited Feature Film – Comedy or Musical	Matthew Friedman and Andrew Dickler	Won	
Art Directors Guild Awards	April 10, 2021	Excellence in Production Design for a Contemporary Film	Jason Kisvarday	Nominated	
Critics' Choice Movie Awards	March 7, 2021	Best Comedy	Palm Springs	Won	
Critics' Choice Super Awards	January 10, 2021	Best Science Fiction/Fantasy Movie	Palm Springs	Won	
Critics' Choice Super Awards	January 10, 2021	Best Actor in a Science Fiction/Fantasy Movie	Andy Samberg	Won	
Critics' Choice Super Awards	January 10, 2021	Best Actor in a Science Fiction/Fantasy Movie	J. K. Simmons	Nominated	
Critics' Choice Super Awards	January 10, 2021	Best Actress in a Science Fiction/Fantasy Movie	Cristin Milioti	Won	
Critics' Choice Super Awards	January 10, 2021	Best Villain in a Movie	J. K. Simmons	Nominated	
Golden Globe Awards	February 28, 2021	Best Motion Picture – Musical or Comedy	Palm Springs	Nominated	
Golden Globe Awards	February 28, 2021	Best Actor in a Motion Picture – Musical or Comedy	Andy Samberg	Nominated	
Hollywood Critics Association	March 5, 2021	Best Comedy or Musical	Palm Springs	Won	
Hollywood Critics Association	March 5, 2021	Best Indie Film	Palm Springs	Nominated	
Hollywood Critics Association	March 5, 2021	Best Original Screenplay	Andy Siara	Nominated	
Hollywood Music in Media Awards	January 27, 2021	Best Original Score in a Sci-Fi/Fantasy Film	Matthew Compton	Nominated	
Hugo Awards	April 13, 2021	Best Dramatic Presentation, Long Form	Max Barbakow and Andy Siara	Nominated	
Independent Spirit Awards	April 22, 2021	Best First Screenplay	Andy Siara	Won	
Set Decorators Society of America Awards	March 31, 2021	Best Achievement in Décor/Design of a Science Fiction or Fantasy Feature Film	Kelsi Ephraim and Jason Kisvarday	Nominated	

== See also ==
- List of films featuring time loops
