= J. K. Simmons =

American actor (born 1955)

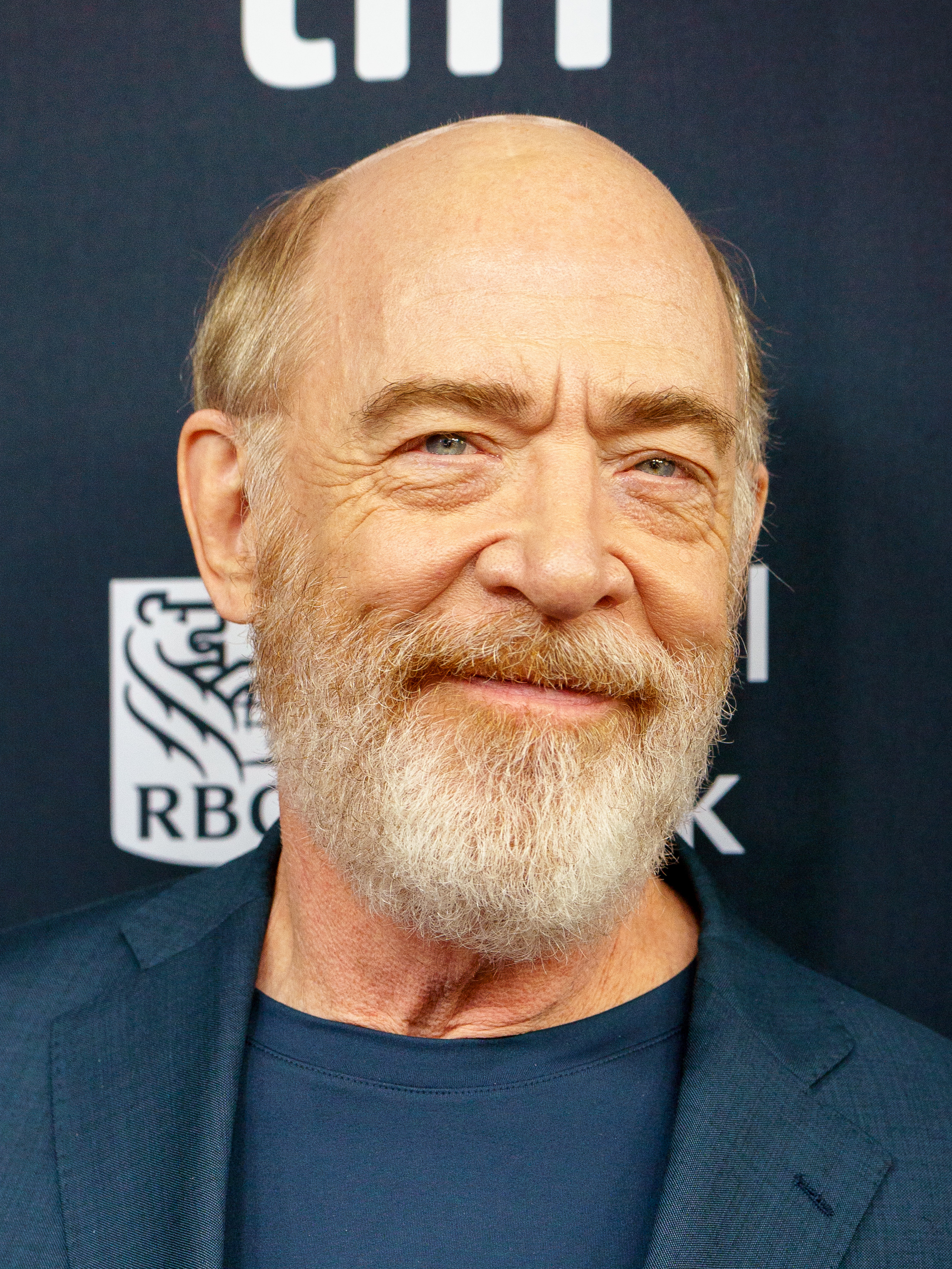
- Simmons in 2024
- Born: Jonathan Kimble Simmons; January 9, 1955 (age 71); Grosse Pointe, Michigan, U.S.
- Education: University of Montana (BA)
- Occupation: Actor
- Years active: 1976–present
- Works: Performances
- Spouse: Michelle Schumacher (m. 1996)
- Children: 2
- Awards: Full list

Jonathan Kimble Simmons (born January 9, 1955) is an American actor. Considered among the most established and enduring character actors of his generation, he has amassed over 200 screen and stage credits since his 1986 debut. He played Terence Fletcher, an abusive jazz instructor, in Damien Chazelle's Whiplash (2013) and Whiplash (2014), winning the Academy Award for Best Supporting Actor for the latter performance, and received a second nomination for portraying William Frawley in Aaron Sorkin's Being the Ricardos (2021). His other various accolades include a British Academy Film Award, a Golden Globe Award, and a Screen Actors Guild Award.

Simmons achieved international fame with his role as J. Jonah Jameson in Sam Raimi's Spider-Man trilogy (2002–2007), a role he reprised in various Marvel media unrelated to the Raimi trilogy, including multiple animated titles and the Marvel Cinematic Universe films. He has appeared in numerous supporting roles in films such as The Cider House Rules (1999), Thank You for Smoking (2005), Juno (2007), Burn After Reading (2008), Up in the Air (2009), Jennifer's Body (2009), Terminator Genisys (2015), Patriots Day (2016), La La Land (2016), Justice League (2017), Palm Springs (2020), and Juror No. 2 (2024). He played two different interpretations of Santa Claus in Klaus (2019) and Red One (2024).

On television, he rose to prominence for playing white supremacist prisoner Vernon Schillinger on the HBO series Oz (1997–2003), the recurring role of Dr. Emil Skoda on the NBC series Law & Order (1997–2010), Assistant Police Chief Will Pope on the TNT series The Closer (2005–2012), and Howard Silk in the Starz series Counterpart (2017–2019). He has also appeared in commercials for Farmers Insurance. On the Broadway stage Simmons played Captain Hook in the 1991 revival of Peter Pan and Benny Southstreet in the 1992 revival of Guys and Dolls.

As a voice actor, he has played the Yellow M&M in commercials since 1996, Cave Johnson in the video game Portal 2 (2011), White Knight in Generator Rex (2010–2013), Tenzin in The Legend of Korra (2012–2014), Stanford "Ford" Pines in Gravity Falls (2015–2016), Kai in Kung Fu Panda 3 (2016), Mayor Leodore Lionheart in Zootopia (2016), Martin Smarty in Kim Possible (2002–2007), Nolan Grayson / Omni-Man in Invincible (2021–present) and Mortal Kombat 1 (2023), and General Ketheric Thorm in the video game Baldur's Gate 3 (2023)

== Early life and education ==
Jonathan Kimble Simmons was born on January 9, 1955, in Grosse Pointe, Michigan, to Patricia (née Kimble; 1929–2014), an administrator, and Donald William Simmons (1928–2012), a music teacher at Parcells Middle School. One of three children, Simmons attended Ferry Elementary School in Grosse Pointe Woods. In 1965, when he was 10 years old, his family moved to Worthington, Ohio, a suburb of Columbus, Ohio. From 1970 to 1972, he attended Worthington High School, where he participated in drama, football and choir. In 1973, when he was 18, they moved to Missoula, Montana, where his father became director of the School of Music at the University of Montana. The younger Simmons graduated from the University of Montana in 1978 with a Bachelor of Arts degree in music. During college, he became a member of the music-oriented fraternity Phi Mu Alpha Sinfonia. Simmons appeared at the Bigfork Summer Playhouse in Bigfork, Montana, in various roles from 1977 to 1982. Later, he moved to Seattle and became a member of the Seattle Repertory Theatre, where he met his best friend Michael Smith. Simmons eventually landed his first role on Broadway in 1992.

== Career ==
=== Stage ===
On Broadway, Simmons played Benny Southstreet in the 1992 revival of Guys and Dolls. In 1994, he sang multiple roles in the Wagner opera satire Das Barbecü. He also played the role of Jigger in a revival of Carousel with the Houston Grand Opera and starred in the 1987 Off-Broadway musical Birds of Paradise. During his time on Broadway, Simmons also played Captain Hook in Peter Pan (1991–1992).

=== Film and television ===
Simmons made his first appearance in a live-action television role in the show Popeye Doyle, appearing as a patrol officer. The next year, Simmons appeared on All My Children, as an RCMP sergeant. Among his more notable roles are Dr. Emil Skoda, a police psychiatrist whom Simmons played on three of the four incarnations of Law & Order and New York Undercover, and sadistic neo-Nazi inmate Vernon Schillinger on the prison drama Oz.

He appeared as Ralph Earnhardt, the father of race-car driver Dale Earnhardt, in 3: The Dale Earnhardt Story, and also made appearances as Will Pope, Assistant Chief of the LAPD, in the series The Closer. In the show Raising Hope, he plays Burt Chance's brother Bruce Chance. In a precursor to joining the Law & Order cast as Skoda, Simmons appeared in Homicide: Life on the Street, portraying a criminal in a Law & Order cross-over episode. Other roles include an army general in the television sitcom Arrested Development, and Dan the Barber in the surreal Nickelodeon series The Adventures of Pete & Pete in 1995.

He played B.R. in the film Thank You for Smoking (2005) and has been praised for his performance in Juno (2007) as "Mac" McGuff, the title character's father. Simmons played J. Jonah Jameson, editor-in-chief of the newspaper Daily Bugle, in all three of Sam Raimi's Spider-Man films, as well as in the expanded video game adaptation of Spider-Man 3. In 2008, he played a CIA superior in Burn After Reading and appeared in Postal as Candidate Welles. He also appeared in I Love You, Man as the father of Paul Rudd's character.

Throughout 2011 to 2018, Simmons was a prime-time voice actor for the Adult Swim stop-motion series Robot Chicken. Simmons performed various voices for several characters over the last couple of years. For example, one of the characters that he played was Vernon Schillinger (in 2011) for a singular episode. In 2011 and 2014, he also voiced Master Chief for various scenes throughout two episodes. Lastly in 2018, he voiced the widely known J. Jonah Jameson for an episode.

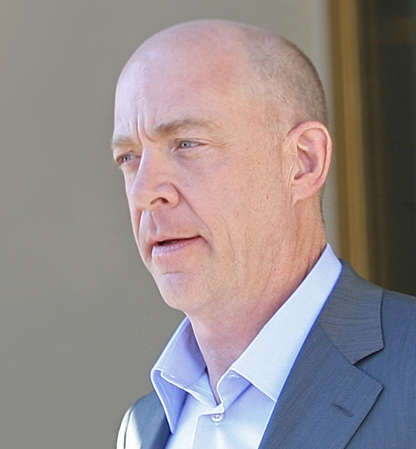
Simmons at the 2007 Toronto International Film Festival

Simmons starred in several films produced or directed by his friend Jason Reitman, including Thank You for Smoking, Juno, Up in the Air, and Jennifer's Body. In 2013, he had a small role as Mr. Jervis in Reitman's film Labor Day. He voices Tenzin, an Airbending master and the son of Aang and Katara, in the 2012 Nickelodeon series The Legend of Korra, the sequel series to the 2005 Nickelodeon series Avatar: The Last Airbender. He starred as blind lawyer "Mel Fisher" in Growing Up Fisher. From 2015 to 2016, he voiced the scientist Stanford Pines on the Disney Channel and Disney XD animated series Gravity Falls for the second season.

In the 2014 drama film Whiplash, Simmons played Terence Fletcher, an intensely demanding and abusive bandleader at the fictional Shaffer Conservatory of Music, who bullies and cajoles his student, Andrew Neiman (Miles Teller). The wide acclaim for Simmons's performance included winning an Academy Award for Best Supporting Actor. Rolling Stone said "Beat the drums for an Oscar for Simmons." Richard Roeper of the Chicago Sun-Times said "Simmons delivers one of the most memorable performances of the year." Entertainment Weekly summed up the reaction by saying Simmons's performance "has been universally praised" and that he was "a leading contender for Best Supporting Actor." On January 11, 2015, Simmons won the Golden Globe Award for Best Supporting Actor – Motion Picture, and he went on to win the Academy Award for Best Supporting Actor on February 22, 2015.

In January 2015, Simmons was cast in a leading role in the film Kong: Skull Island, though he and Michael Keaton later exited the film. Simmons performed a substantial number of voice-over roles alongside his live action work. Several of these have arisen from his J. Jonah Jameson character in Raimi's Spider-Man films, including voices of two newspaper editors in episodes of the eighteenth season of The Simpsons. While unnamed, these characters are clearly meant to emulate Jameson (one, bearing Jameson's appearance, demands "pictures of Spider-Man," then once reminded he works at a poetry journal, demands "poems about Spider-Man"). Likewise, Simmons voiced an editor-in-chief of a newspaper (with Jameson's appearance and mannerisms) for a 2013 episode of The Hub's Pound Puppies. In 2015, he appeared as the German expatriate Sebastian in the Greek drama film Worlds Apart.

Simmons reprised his role as the voice of J. Jonah Jameson in the animated series The Avengers: Earth's Mightiest Heroes, Ultimate Spider-Man, Avengers Assemble, and Hulk and the Agents of S.M.A.S.H. In friend Reitman's film Young Adult, he voiced the protagonist's boss, via a series of voicemails. He also provided the voice of General Wade Eiling in Justice League Unlimited. He recorded an audiobook for Tom Clancy's Net Force: Point of Impact.

In 2016, Simmons portrayed Watertown Police Sergeant Jeffrey Pugliese in the film Patriots Day.

He starred in the science fiction thriller Counterpart from 2017 to 2019, playing dual roles as Howard Silk and Howard Silk Prime.

In 2017, Simmons portrayed Commissioner James Gordon in Joss Whedon's film Justice League, part of the DC Extended Universe. He reappeared in archive footage for Zack Snyder's Justice League, the 2021 director's cut. Simmons filmed scenes reprising the role in the completed Batgirl film before its 2022 release was cancelled. He voiced himself in an episode of SuperMansion.

In the field of television commercials, Simmons is widely known for being the voice of the yellow M&M, a role he has played since 1996, replacing John Goodman. He has also done voice-over work for Philips Norelco razors. In live-action, he is featured as Professor Nathaniel Burke of the University of Farmers in ads for Farmers Insurance Group, since 2010.

In 2017, Simmons had a small cameo in SpongeBob SquarePants as Conductor Maestro Mackerel, a parody of his Whiplash character, for the season 10 episode Snooze You Lose.

In 2019, Simmons reprised his role of J. Jonah Jameson in the Marvel Cinematic Universe (MCU) film Spider-Man: Far From Home, as a cameo in the mid-credits scene. He is the second actor to portray the same character in both a non-MCU and MCU film, following Lou Ferrigno as the voice of the Hulk. He returns in the role in the 2019 Web series The Daily Bugle and the films Venom: Let There Be Carnage and Spider-Man: No Way Home, both released in 2021, as well as the 2022 film Morbius, in a scene cut from the theatrical release. He also starred in the fourth season of Veronica Mars as Clyde Pickett, a ex-con working as a fixer for Richard Casablancas Sr.

In 2020, he had a guest spot as Frank Dillman on the police sitcom Brooklyn Nine-Nine. He also narrated the Netflix limited series documentary Coronavirus, Explained and co-starred in the critically acclaimed sci-fi/comedy Palm Springs, which premiered at the Sundance Film Festival in January and on Hulu in July.

From 2014 to 2020, Simmons voiced Lenny Turteltaub in the animated show BoJack Horseman.

In 2021, Simmons provided the voice for Omni-Man in the animated show Invincible, played the role of George Zax, CEO of a family-owned and operated pharmaceutical company on the fourth season of Goliath, and also appeared in the military science-fiction film The Tomorrow War.

In 2021, Simmons was the voice of Tusk Johnson, Mountain Man in the animated show The Great North.

In 2021, Simmons portrayed William Frawley in the Amazon movie Being the Ricardos, for which he received his second Academy Award nomination.

In 2024, Simmons portrayed Santa Claus in the holiday movie Red One.

=== Voice acting ===
In 2016, Simmons voiced characters in two animated films, voicing the antagonist Kai in Kung Fu Panda 3 and Mayor Lionheart in Zootopia.

=== Video games ===
In 2005, Simmons also reprised his role of J. Jonah Jameson, as a voice actor, for the PSP version of Spider-Man 2: The Video Game. Later in 2007, he also voiced the same character of Jameson in the next game of the series: Spider-Man 3: The Video Game. Simmons, also in 2007, decided to voice Jameson one last time in Stern Pinball: Spider-Man.

Simmons appears as the anti-communist U.S. President Howard T. Ackerman in the video game Command & Conquer: Red Alert 3 and for a series of promotional advertisements parodying the 2008 presidential elections. In these advertisements, he offers himself (as Ackerman) as an alternative to other, unnamed presidential candidates and uses the slogan "Vote for me, if you want to live". In the 2008 United States Presidential election, 43 people voted for Simmons (as Ackerman) as a write-in candidate.

In 2011, Simmons also appeared in Generator Rex: Agent of Providence, as White Knight.

In April 2011, he appeared in Portal 2 as the voice of Aperture Science founder Cave Johnson, a performance that was lauded as the "surprise star turn" of the game. He reprised his role as Cave Johnson in the 2015 video game Lego Dimensions, the 2022 video game Aperture Desk Job, and was introduced to be a part of the Dota 2 2022 Battle Pass: Part II in an Announcer and Mega Kills Packs.

Simmons provided the voice-over for the M&M's "spokescandy", Yellow in M&M's: Shell Shocked and M&M's: The Lost Formulas.

Simmons also appeared as General Ketheric Thorm in the 2023 video game Baldur's Gate 3.

In September 2023, Simmons reprised his role as Omni-Man in the video game Mortal Kombat 1. He also voices the character in Invincible VS.

== Personal life ==
Simmons married film director Michelle Schumacher in 1996. They have two children; their daughter Olivia has appeared in two films, The Only Good Indian (2009) and I'm Not Here (2017), while their son Joe has also made occasional appearances in low-budget films. Simmons stated in an interview that he encouraged their interest in acting.

Simmons is an avid fan of the Detroit Tigers. He threw the ceremonial first pitch for the Tigers on April 6, 2015, for Opening Day, and played the Tigers' manager in For Love of the Game (1999). He is also a fan of the Ohio State Buckeyes, having spent his formative years in Ohio.

During Mardi Gras 2018, he was appointed King of Bacchus by the Krewe of Bacchus.

Simmons endorsed Democrat Dave Strohmaier for Montana's sole seat in the United States House of Representatives in the 2012 election.
