= Rumaan Alam =

Bangladeshi-American writer (born 1977)

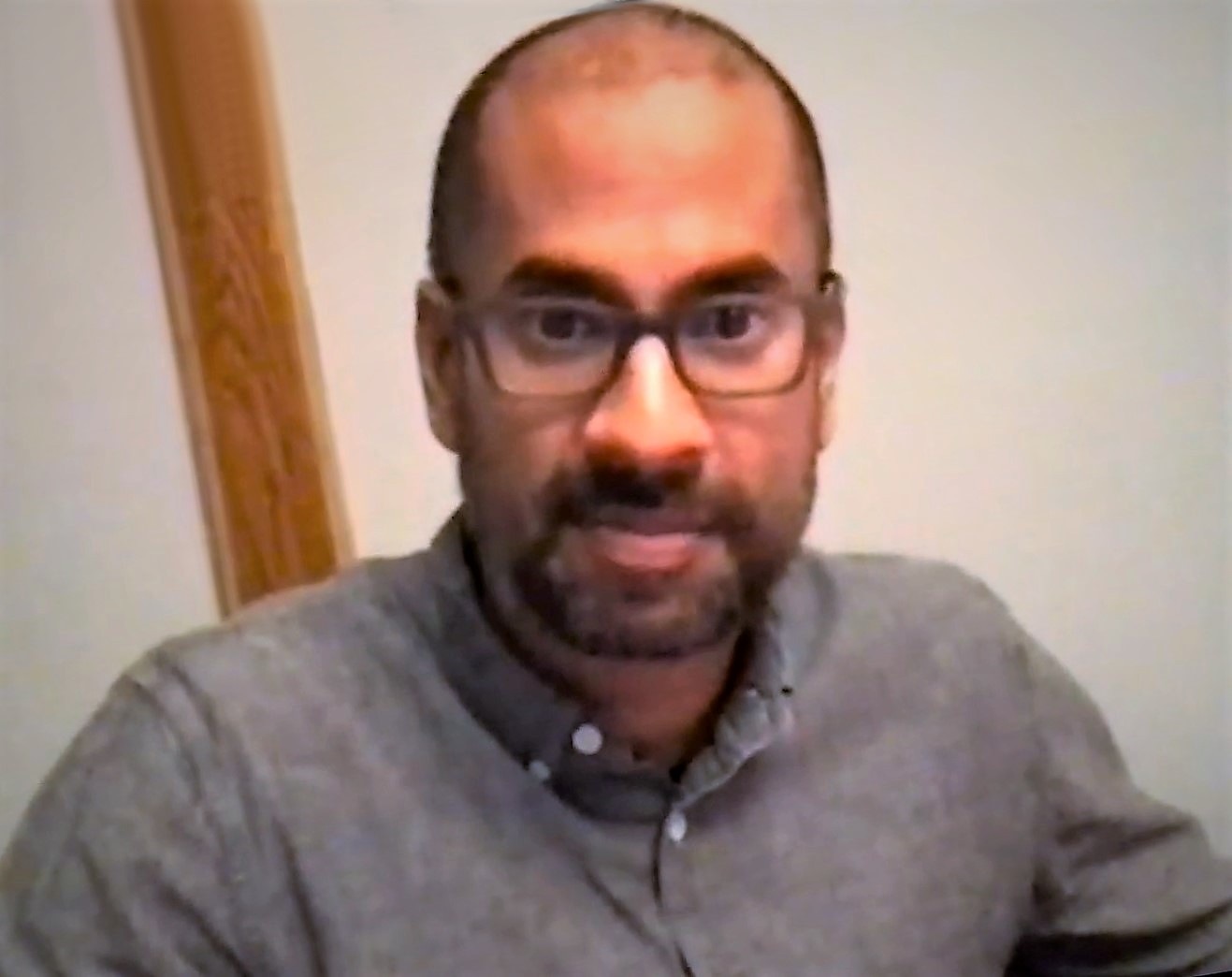
- Born: August 9, 1977 (48 years)
- Education: Oberlin College
- Occupation: Writer
- Writing career
- Genres: Thriller, literary fiction
- Notable work: Leave the World Behind
- Website: www.rumaanalam.com

Rumaan Alam (born August 9, 1977) is an American writer best known for his bestselling novel Leave the World Behind.

== Early life and education ==
His parents emigrated from Bangladesh to the United States in the early 1970s. Alam, one of four siblings, was born in 1977 and grew up in a suburb of Washington, D.C. His father being an architect and his mother being a paediatrician, he had an upper-middle class lifestyle while growing up in a mostly white area. He studied writing at Oberlin College.

== Career ==
He is the author of four novels: Leave the World Behind, That Kind of Mother, Rich and Pretty, and Entitlement. He also hosts two podcasts for Slate.

Leave the World Behind was acclaimed by book critics and nominated for the 2020 National Book Award. It was later adapted as a 2023 film for Netflix with the same name.

== Personal life ==
He and his husband, photographer David Land, whom he met on a blind date in 2003, adopted two boys.

== Works ==
- Rich and Pretty. New York, NY: Ecco. 2016-06-07. ISBN 978-0-06-242993-3. OCLC 921864794.
- That Kind of Mother. New York: Ecco. 2018-05-08. ISBN 978-0-06-266760-1.
- Leave the World Behind (2020, Ecco Press) ISBN 978-0-06-266764-9
- Getaway (2022)
- Entitlement. Penguin Group. 2024-09-17. ISBN 978-0-593-71846-9.
