= Leave the World Behind (film) =

2023 film by Sam Esmail

- Promotional poster
- Directed by: Sam Esmail
- Screenplay by: Sam Esmail
- Based on: Leave the World Behind by Rumaan Alam
- Produced by: Julia Roberts; Marisa Yeres Gill; Lisa Gillan; Sam Esmail; Chad Hamilton
- Starring: Julia Roberts; Mahershala Ali; Ethan Hawke; Myha'la; Kevin Bacon
- Cinematography: Tod Campbell
- Edited by: Lisa Lassek
- Music by: Mac Quayle
- Production companies: Esmail Corp; Red Om Films; Higher Ground Productions
- Distributed by: Netflix
- Release dates: October 25, 2023 (AFI); November 22, 2023
- Running time: 140 minutes
- Country: United States
- Language: English

Leave the World Behind is a 2023 American apocalyptic psychological thriller film written and directed by Sam Esmail. It is based on the 2020 novel by Rumaan Alam. The film stars Julia Roberts, Mahershala Ali, Ethan Hawke, Myha'la, and Kevin Bacon as they attempt to make sense of the gradual breakdown in phones, television, and other regularly used technology which points to a potential cataclysm.

Leave the World Behind had its world premiere at the AFI Fest on October 25, 2023. It was released in select theaters on November 22, 2023, before its streaming release by Netflix on December 8, 2023. It received positive reviews from critics.

== Plot ==
Misanthrope Amanda Sandford arranges an impromptu weekend getaway at a vacation rental with her husband Clay and their kids, Archie and Rose. After arriving at the rental, Amanda goes to the store. While shopping for groceries, Amanda sees a man stocking up on large quantities of canned food and water. Later, while the family relaxes at a nearby beach, they evade an oil tanker crashing on shore. When they return to the house, they notice the TV and internet connection are not working and a pair of deer stare at them.

That night, the owner, George H. ("G.H.") Scott, and his daughter, Ruth, arrive at the house. Seeking shelter, G.H. explains that a blackout caused their return. Amanda is suspicious and does not want them to stay. Clay, however, trusts them and lets them stay the night. Later in the night, the television switches to displaying an Emergency Action Notification from the Emergency Alert System on all channels.

The next morning, Rose is frustrated that the internet connection and TV are still down, which has prevented her from watching the series finale of Friends. Amanda notices four news alerts on her phone, two of which are about the blackout affecting the East Coast, the third alert about a hacker attack being behind the power outage and the final one beginning with the word "Breaking" and containing corrupted or encrypted text. Rose sees a much larger herd of deer standing motionless in the backyard.

Attempting to learn about the disruptions and fix the internet connection, Clay drives to town while G.H. heads to his neighbor's house. Clay gets lost and exits his car to look around, missing a few seconds of clear reception on the radio broadcasting news of the cyberattack having catastrophic environmental effects in the Southern US. He finds a Spanish-speaking woman seeking help, but abandons her and eventually encounters a drone dropping leaflets written in Arabic. G.H. searches the neighbor's home, finds a satellite phone inside, and finds there is no signal from the satellites. On the beach nearby, he discovers the wreckage of a plane crash just before narrowly escaping another airliner crashing.

Rose walks with Archie in the woods, where they come across an empty shed and Archie removes a tick from his ankle on the way back. Returning to the house, G.H. confides to Amanda the events he has witnessed. He thinks that satellite connectivity has been disrupted, but he is cut off by a loud, shrill noise that lasts several seconds. Amanda recalls the man stockpiling supplies, whom G.H. assumes to be Danny, his contractor. Clay returns shaken with the leaflet, which Archie partially translates as "Death to America". The Sandfords decide to drive to Amanda's sister in New Jersey but find the expressway jammed with collided brand-new self-driving Teslas. After they narrowly avoid more incoming Tesla cars continuing to drive into the pile-up, they are forced to return to G.H.'s house.

Throughout the night, Ruth asks Clay provocative questions, and they later discover flamingos in the pool. Amanda and G.H. establish a friendly bond but they are cut off by a second shrill noise, and the power fails. Later, Rose tells Amanda a version of the parable of the drowning man from an episode of The West Wing.

The next morning, Archie's teeth inexplicably fall out. Believing it is related to the tick bite, G.H. suggests visiting Danny for medicine. Rose is now missing and G.H. and Clay take Archie to visit Danny, while Amanda and Ruth search for Rose. At the shed, the two are confronted by an even larger herd of deer, which they scare away. G.H. and Clay attempt to convince Danny to help Archie, which results in an armed standoff between G.H. and Danny. Clay intervenes, convincing Danny to help Archie. Danny informs them that another neighbor may be equipped with an underground bunker and suggests that the shrill noises which have most likely led to Archie's teeth falling out result from the use of microwave weapons.

Shaken, G.H. tells Clay and Archie that on the basis of his work with military contractors, he spends a lot of time studying cost-benefit analysis on military campaigns. He surmises that the most terrifying maneuver to topple a country from within is a three-stage campaign. The first stage is isolation, to disable communication and disorient the population, followed by synchronized chaos, misleading information, and covert attacks, and lastly, the mistrust and the breakdown of social order leading to a coup d'état or civil war. At the same time, Amanda and Ruth watch New York City being bombed. Rose then finds the neighbor's house with the bunker. Inside, a computer message warns of attacks by rogue military elements and elevated radiation levels in many U.S. cities. She finds a DVD of Friends and watches the series finale.

== Cast ==
- Julia Roberts as Amanda Sandford
- Mahershala Ali as G.H. Scott
- Ethan Hawke as Clay Sandford
- Myha'la as Ruth Scott
- Farrah Mackenzie as Rose Sandford
- Charlie Evans as Archie Sandford
- Kevin Bacon as Danny
- Vanessa Aspillaga as Salvadora

== Production ==
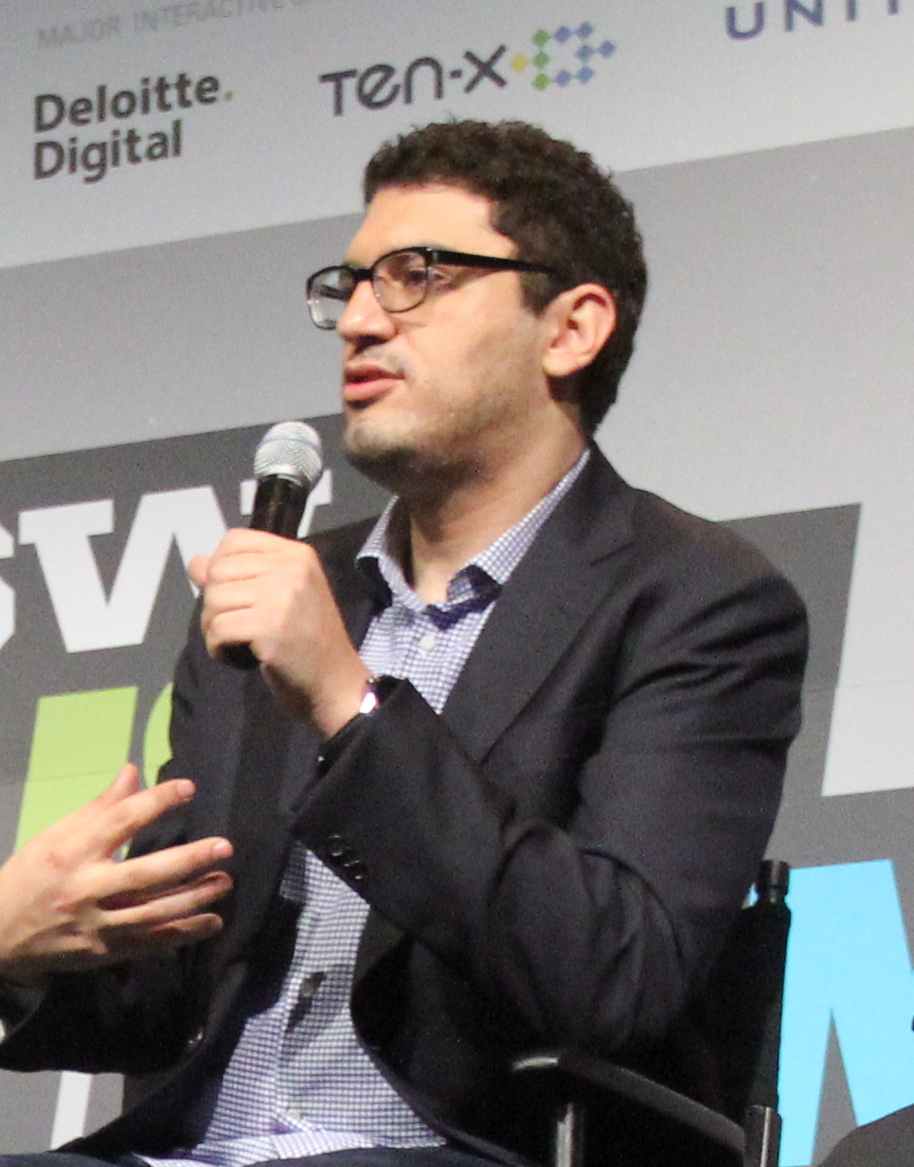
Writer/director Sam Esmail

Netflix won a bidding war for the rights to the novel by Rumaan Alam in July 2020, with Sam Esmail attached to write and direct. Julia Roberts and Denzel Washington were set to star in and produce the film.

Former U.S. President Barack and First Lady Michelle Obama executive-produced the film through their Higher Ground Productions banner. Obama included the novel on his 2021 summer reading list.

=== Writing ===
Obama offered Esmail his thoughts on the screenplay during the writing process. Esmail said, "He had a lot of notes about the characters and the empathy we would have for them. I have to say he is a big movie lover, and he wasn't just giving notes about things that were from his background. He was giving notes as a fan of the book, and he wanted to see a really good film."

=== Casting and filming ===
In September 2021, Mahershala Ali had been cast in the film, replacing Washington, who had left the project. Ethan Hawke and Myha'la Herrold joined in January 2022.

Filming began in April 2022 on Long Island, in a home designed by The Up Studio. Additional filming took place in Katonah, New York, in May 2022.

== Soundtrack ==
Mac Quayle composed an original score for the film which consisted of nine notes and was inspired by French composer Olivier Messiaen and his Messiaen modes, namely Mode 3. Quayle said, "I started playing around with them and I found that Mode 3, which is essentially a scale, was producing a really interesting harmonic feeling," going on to say "And I got this idea that I might do the entire film in this one mode... I didn't know if it would carry me through the entire film, but it did."

Esmail tried to pick songs that had not been used on TV or film before as he was worried viewers would have associations with those songs that would "interfere or complicate what the scene's about or what the viewer is feeling as they're watching the scene". For example, Esmail chose "Too Close" by Next, a song that he felt was "really funny and sweet at the same time" and had not been overused in film, for a scene that "goes from lighthearted and playful to sad and dark within a matter of a minute".

== Release ==
Leave the World Behind had its world premiere as the opening film of the AFI Fest on October 25, 2023, with the cast not attending due to the 2023 SAG-AFTRA strike. It was released in limited theaters on November 22, before streaming Netflix on December 8, 2023.

== Reception ==
=== Critical response ===
On the review aggregator website Rotten Tomatoes, 73% of 160 critics' reviews are positive, with an average rating of 6.7/10. The website's consensus reads: "An exceptionally well-acted apocalyptic thriller, Leave the World Behind steadily draws the viewer in despite its leisurely pace and somewhat simplistic messaging." Metacritic, which uses a weighted average, assigned the film a score of 68 out of 100, based on 35 critics, indicating "generally favorable" reviews.

In a positive review for The Washington Post, Michael O'Sullivan wrote, "It plays like an M. Night Shyamalan movie, but without the supernatural element and with a thick vein of social critique running throughout. What happens may be extreme, but it feels based on mundane reality." Wenlei Ma writing for The Sunday Times called the film "jittery and suspenseful", and that some overhead cinematography "emphasises that we're all puppets in someone's else [sic] marionette theatre ... we're not in control, but Esmail is of his startling, character-driven doomsday story".

Bilge Ebiri for Vulture compared the film unfavorably to Alam's book: "every change made for the adaptation happens to be for the worse. ... the film doesn't demonstrate any kind of interest in, or affection for, its characters. ... This feels more like a collection of cool ideas than scenes that belong to the same emotional and consequential continuum." Alissa Wilkinson for The New York Times wrote, "After a while, the movie plays like a bulleted list of everything wrong with America ... the narrative tension dulls into passivity, both for us and for the characters", and that the "ending seems like a punchline."

Esmail said he hoped the film's ending would provoke conversation: "...the expectation is at the end of [traditional disaster] films, your cast of characters overcomes the disaster and the world reverts back to some sane semblance of normalcy. I knew that I wasn't going to do that."

=== Audience viewership ===
From December 4 to December 10, 2023, the film topped the streaming charts and was the number one film on Netflix, with 41.7 million views. By the end of 2023, it had accumulated 121 million views. In January 2024, the film entered Netflix's most popular films of all-time list at eighth place, scoring 136.3 million views in its first 52 days. As of September 2024, it is placed as the fifth most popular film in English of all time on Netflix, with 143.4 million views.

=== Accolades ===
Award	Date of ceremony	Category	Recipient(s)	Result	Ref.
AARP Movies for Grownups Awards	January 17, 2024	Best Intergenerational Movie	Leave the World Behind	Nominated	
AARP Movies for Grownups Awards	January 17, 2024	Best Actress	Julia Roberts	Nominated	
People's Choice Awards	February 18, 2024	The Drama Movie of the Year	Leave the World Behind	Nominated	
People's Choice Awards	February 18, 2024	The Female Movie Star of the Year	Julia Roberts	Nominated	
People's Choice Awards	February 18, 2024	The Drama Movie Star of the Year	Julia Roberts	Nominated	
Set Decorators Society of America	February 13, 2024	Best Achievement in Décor/Design of a Contemporary Feature Film	David Schlesinger and Anastasia White	Nominated	
