= Leave the World Behind (novel) =

2020 novel by Rumaan Alam

- Author: Rumaan Alam
- Audio read by: Marin Ireland
- Cover artist: Jessica Brilli
- Language: English
- Set in: Long Island
- Publisher: Ecco
- Publication date: October 6, 2020
- Publication place: United States
- Media type: Print (hardcover, paperback), e-book, audiobook
- Pages: 256
- ISBN: 978-0-06266763-2 (hardcover)
- Website: www.rumaanalam.com/work/ltwb

Leave the World Behind is a 2020 novel by Rumaan Alam, published by Ecco. In 2023, the novel was adapted into a feature film by Netflix.

== Plot summary ==
A family consisting of parents Amanda and Clay and their children Archie and Rose drive to a remote area on Long Island, where they have rented an expensive house for a vacation. One night, a couple, George and Ruth, arrive at the house unexpectedly. They claim to be the owners of the house and explain their presence as due to a blackout in the city, offering a partial refund in return for George and Ruth staying in part of the house. Amanda receives news of a blackout across the East Coast of the United States, but she remains suspicious of George and Ruth. Clay insists on letting George and Ruth stay. The phone, television, and Internet services at the house fail.

The next day, it is hotter than usual, and Rose sees dozens of deer outside the house, later seeing thousands more deer. Clay leaves the deer alone, wanting to drive to town to learn more about the situation, but he becomes lost. He encounters a distressed woman who can only speak Spanish; she discusses something about "electric", "telephone" and "deer" which he cannot comprehend and he abandons her. Rose and Archie decide to explore the surrounding forest, resulting in Archie being bitten by a tick.

Rose, Archie and Clay return to the house after hearing loud noises, which crack the glass doors. Clay says that he did not see anyone during his drive. The adults prepare for a long blackout, filling the bathtub with water and checking on the food stores. Archie falls ill with a fever, and his parents decide to bring him to a doctor the next day. At night, many wild flamingos arrive at the house. More loud noises ring out (from planes), and bats fall to the ground.

The next day, several of Archie's teeth have fallen out, and he vomits out blood, while Rose is missing. Clay admits having gotten lost in his earlier trip, so George offers to show Clay how to drive Archie to the hospital. During the journey, Clay admits to George that he met and abandoned the Spanish-speaking woman despite her need for help. George suspects that the woman was his maid, Rosa. Clay and George visit George's contractor, Danny, who treats them coldly. Danny discusses the mass migration of deer as a bad omen and declines to help them. Danny recommends that the trio return to George's house, which they agree to.

Elsewhere in the world, people have died after the disruption to the electricity; there have been floods; states of emergency have been instituted; and the American president has gone to hiding in a bunker. Amanda and Ruth search for Rose but fail to find her. Rose returns to a house she saw the previous day, with no inhabitants there, Rose raids the house for supplies to bring back to George's house.

== Reception ==
=== Critical reception ===
Writing for The New Yorker, Hillary Kelly praised the novel as "enthralling".

=== Honors ===
It was a finalist for the 2020 National Book Award for Fiction, and was assessed by Emily Temple of Literary Hub to have been included on twenty year-end lists featuring the best novels of 2020.

== Film adaptation ==
The novel was adapted into a 2023 film by Netflix. In the film, the character of Ruth is changed to George's daughter, instead of his wife.
