= Goosebumps 2: Haunted Halloween (soundtrack) =

Goosebumps 2: Haunted Halloween (Original Motion Picture Soundtrack)

Film score by Dominic Lewis
- Released: October 12, 2018
- Genre: Film score
- Length: 43:43
- Label: Madison Gate Records
- Producer: Dominic Lewis

Dominic Lewis chronology
Peter Rabbit (2018)	Goosebumps 2: Haunted Halloween (2018)	My Spy (2020)

Goosebumps 2: Haunted Halloween (Original Motion Picture Soundtrack) is the film score soundtrack to the 2018 film Goosebumps 2: Haunted Halloween, which is the sequel to Goosebumps (2015). The film score is composed by Dominic Lewis and released through Madison Gate Records on October 12, 2018.

== Background ==
Dominic Lewis composed the film score, replacing Danny Elfman who composed the predecessor. Lewis found it "very daunting following someone like Danny Elfman" as he had to follow Elfman's work for the original film, as well as creating new themes. The main theme composed by Elfman for the first film, was used by Lewis sparsely. Independently, he wanted to bring his orchestral sound to the film, similar to the predecessor. Lewis described the score for Haunted Halloween as his homage to the 1980s action adventure films but mixed with horror stuff. Despite the sequel's tonality on light-hearted horror, Lewis "purposely tried to go a bit more scary" owing to being true to R. L. Stine's horror novels. He added, "it works out because the first half of the movie, which I’d say is probably the scariest, actually all takes place within the day time. So that afforded me to go a little bit scarier with the music as it contrasts the fact that it is the day time, because you always assume the scary stuff is going to happen at night." Lewis further wanted to home in on the creepiness, which resulted in him using three different piano that were tuned in various ways—the first tuned normally, second a bit higher and the third a bit low, and put through delay and reverb—in addition to the use of celeste, harp and glockenspiel to achieve the dark magic type of sound.

== Track listing ==
No.	Title	Length
1.	"Haunted Halloween"	1:41
2.	"Terror-fried Eggs"	1:15
3.	"Junk Brothers"	1:52
4.	"Bike Chase"	1:19
5.	"Hadouken"	3:15
6.	"Fright Bulb"	0:57
7.	"Drowned and Out"	1:07
8.	"Crash Dummies"	0:35
9.	"Dr. Shivers"	1:24
10.	"Slappy Families"	3:23
11.	"Sup My Witches?!"	1:26
12.	"Slappy Halloween"	1:38
13.	"Gummy Bears"	3:57
14.	"Ungrateful Dead"	1:18
15.	"Costume Drama"	2:11
16.	"Witch, Please!"	3:33
17.	"Mama-Fied"	0:45
18.	"Seedy Part of Town"	1:04
19.	"Oh Gnomes!!"	2:04
20.	"Creep It Real"	1:38
21.	"Allegro Con Spirito"	5:28
22.	"Slappily Ever After"	1:53
Total length:		43:43

== Reception ==
Kaya Savas of Film.Music.Media wrote "The score is better than it has any right to be for this Goosebumps sequel, and the movie should be grateful they had Dominic's score to lean on [... it] hooks you with the main theme and carries you for a fun journey all the way through." Owen Gleiberman of Variety and Frank Scheck of The Hollywood Reporter found the score to be partly enjoyable and great, while Jayson McNully of Film Daze pointed that he could not recall a single cue from the score.

== Personnel ==
Credits adapted from liner notes:

- Music by: Dominic Lewis
- Music editor: Tom Kramer
- Music recorded and mixed by: Chris Fogel
- Score editor: John Witt Chapman
- Orchestrations: Tommy Laurence, Andrew Kinney, Rick Giovinazzo, Stephen Coleman and Henri Wilkinson
- Synth programming: Vincent Oppido
- Orchestra conducted by: Nick Glennie-Smith
- Pro-tools engineer: Keith Ukrisna
- Music preparation: Booker White
- Orchestra contractor: Peter Rotter
- Music consultant: Daniel Futcher
