= The King's Man (soundtrack) =

The King's Man (Original Motion Picture Score)

Soundtrack album by Matthew Margeson and Dominic Lewis
- Released: 22 December 2021
- Genre: Film score
- Length: 1:18:00
- Label: Hollywood

Kingsman chronology
Kingsman: The Golden Circle (2017)	The King's Man (2021)	Argylle (2024)

Matthew Margeson chronology
A Babysitter's Guide to Monster Hunting (2020)	The King's Man (2021)	Alice's Wonderland Bakery (2022)

Dominic Lewis chronology
Jolt (2021)	The King's Man (2021)	Bullet Train (2022)

The King's Man is the soundtrack to the 2021 film of the same name, composed by Matthew Margeson and Dominic Lewis. Matthew Margeson, who worked with Henry Jackman in the previous Kingsman films, composed the film score with Dominic Lewis. Hollywood Records released the soundtrack digitally on 22 December 2021.

== Development ==
Henry Jackman who scored the previous instalments in the Kingsman franchise was not involved in the prequel. Instead, Matthew Margeson, the co-composer returned as the recurring composer, joining with Dominic Lewis. While the predecessors had modern instruments which emphasized the nature of the spy genre, Lewis and Margeson however used an old-fashioned approach, consisting of classical and grandeur themes with traditional orchestra. He described The King's Man's score as an homage to the traditional film scores in the late-20th century, notably Lawrence of Arabia (1962).

Lewis and Margeson moved to London in January 2019, where a writing room was set up on the film's sets so that the composers could visit the sets and take insights from the scenes that were shot to compose the score, instead of working on the score during post-production. Afterwards, a separate suite for post-production were set up in Long Cross for recording and editing the film's music. Margeson simultaneously worked on Rocketman (2019) while also scoring this film.

Both Lewis and Margeson took 18–22 months on curating the film's score, in contrast to how the composers would individually work on 3–4 months for film scoring. Matthew Vaughn wanted to explore each avenue of the film's music which led the composers rewriting each cue to try different things. The delays caused by COVID-19 pandemic also helped the duo to experiment more on the film's music.

== Release ==
The King's Man's score album was released by Hollywood Records on 22 December 2021, alongside the film.

The film features the original song "Measure of a Man" that is played during the end credits. The song was performed by FKA Twigs and Central Cee being the featuring artist and was released on 18 November 2021; it was however not featured in the soundtrack. An official music video for the song was released on 29 November.

== Track listing ==
All music is composed by Matthew Margeson and Dominic Lewis.

No.	Title	Length
1.	"The King's Man"	4:16
2.	"The Promise"	3:35
3.	"Savile Row"	1:49
4.	"Oxfords, Not Rogues"	3:31
5.	"My Shepherd"	4:33
6.	"We Three Kings"	3:06
7.	"Cost of War"	3:26
8.	"The Lord's Vessel"	2:20
9.	"Network of Domestics"	4:28
10.	"Let Me Lick Your Wounds"	3:23
11.	"Dance on Your Graves (Note: This track references Pyotr Ilyich Tchaikovsky's 1812 Overture.)"	4:10
12.	"Cracking the Code"	3:06
13.	"We Shall Not Sleep"	3:39
14.	"Silent Knife"	4:26
15.	"Crying Conrad"	2:19
16.	"Lionheart"	1:55
17.	"Dulce et Decorum est"	4:57
18.	"Skydiving"	2:45
19.	"Goliath"	2:43
20.	"Out of the Shadows"	1:56
21.	"Crooked Blade"	2:14
22.	"Victoria Cross"	3:09
23.	"Knights of the Roundtable"	3:49
24.	"The New Flock"	2:26
Total length:		1:18:00

== Reception ==
Music critic Jonathan Broxton called it as an "absolutely first-rate film score" further describing it as the "best score in the Kingsman series to date". He admitted that "the new themes that Margeson and Lewis wrote for the film are strong and memorable, and the way they arrange the themes to illustrate a wide range of emotions is impressive" which resulted in the score being the "unexpected, top-drawer surprise for the end of the year". Filmtracks.com wrote "Margeson and Lewis do not match the tight narrative arc and snazzy appeal of Jackman's coordination in Kingsman: The Golden Circle. A better combined presentation of final and unused music would be merited." Chris Bumbray of JoBlo.com called it "excellent" and the "best in the franchise so far, benefitting that thanks to the period setting".

== Additional music ==
Songs not included in the soundtrack, but featured in the film include the following:

In promotional videos and trailers

- "War Pigs" by Black Sabbath (Official trailer 2)
- "Kalinka" by Ivan Larionov (Official red band trailer)
- "Dirty Deeds Done Dirt Cheap" by AC/DC (Final trailer)
- "Rasputin" by Boney M. (Rasputin promo)

During the film

- "Measure of a Man" by Fka Twigs featuring Central Cee
- "The Nutcracker" by Pyotr Ilyich Tchaikovsky
