= Spirited (soundtrack) =

2022 soundtrack albums

Spirited (Soundtrack from the Apple Original Film)

Soundtrack album by Various artists
- Released: November 18, 2022
- Recorded: 2022
- Genre: Pop; jazz; Christmas music; ballad; R&B; alternative hip hop
- Length: 40:49
- Label: Republic
- Producer: Benj Pasek; Justin Paul; Ian Eisendrath; David Metzger

Pasek and Paul chronology
Lyle, Lyle, Crocodile (Original Motion Picture Soundtrack) (2022)	Spirited (2022)	Disney's Snow White (2025)

Singles from Spirited (Soundtrack from the Apple Original Film)
- 1. "Bringin' Back Christmas" Released: October 14, 2022

Spirited (Score from the Apple Original Film)

Film score by Dominic Lewis
- Released: November 18, 2022
- Recorded: 2022
- Genre: Film score
- Length: 43:49
- Label: Republic
- Producer: Dominic Lewis

Dominic Lewis chronology
Bullet Train (2022)	Spirited (2022)	Violent Night (2022)

Two soundtrack albums were released for the 2022 Christmas-themed musical comedy film Spirited: an original soundtrack and an original score. Republic Records released both the albums on November 18, 2022, the same day as the film's release on Apple TV+. The soundtrack features original songs from the film written by the songwriting duo Benj Pasek and Justin Paul and performed by the ensemble cast members: Will Ferrell, Ryan Reynolds, Octavia Spencer, Sunita Mani, Tracy Morgan and Patrick Page. The second album features the motion picture score composed by Dominic Lewis.

== Development ==
Spirited nearly featured 13 original songs written by the Academy Award-winning songwriter duo Benj Pasek and Justin Paul, and co-written by Sukari Jones, Mark Sonnenblick, and Khiyon Hursey. All the tracks in the film were performed by the film's cast members. At the Sound & Screen conference hosted by Deadline Hollywood, the executive music producer Ian Eisendrath stated that he was involved in the recording of vocals and orchestra, mixing and editing the camera work, where the actor actually sings those songs. Musical films are a mixture of vocals live on set and recording from the studio, adding that "We have always had them singing on set because we really wanted to make sure that the audience was experiencing a performance that felt like it was connected to what they were saying. We ended up using a lot of live vocals which was really wonderful." He also took the duties of being a therapist for the cast members to get them comfortable singing in the studio, and then on sets and on camera.

"The thing I find [sic] out about these actors is that if we can connect the text to what they're acting, and they can really think of songs as monologues on pitch — suddenly, they're able to do it. It's almost as if their body and their voice know what they need to do to achieve what that character wants or needs to communicate in a scene."

— Eisendrath on actors singing on set at the Deadline Hollywood's Sound & Screen conference

Eisendrath appreciated Will Ferrell and Ryan Reynolds' ability as actors who can sing well, adding that their performance is not mimicking that of Broadway performers and created their own style. He also felt the recording sessions of the film were more fun as the actors riffed on sets, with Pasek, Paul and his co-writing team, also cooperated with them. He felt that "these songs became a real hybrid, like they are theatrical narrative-driven songs, but they also have the Will and Ryan comedy in them, and they also function on a storytelling level".

Octavia Spencer, who had not sung for previous films, felt that the process was "extremely difficult", adding "The wonderful thing is we had a great music supervisor Ian Eisendrath who taught me not only how to get away from the nerves of singing but use it in the language that I was accustomed to, which is monologues. And then we had a wonderful vocal coach that warmed us up. So it was daunting, but also quite rewarding and satisfying in the end."

== Track listing ==
=== Soundtrack ===
All tracks are written and produced by Benj Pasek and Justin Paul, except for a few tracks co-written by Khiyon Hursey, Mark Sonnenblick and Sukari Jones. Ian Eisendrath and David Metzger co-produced the tracks with Pasek and Paul.

Spirited (Soundtrack from the Apple Original Film)
No.	Title	Writer(s)	Artist(s)	Length
1.	"That Christmas Morning Feelin'"	Benj Pasek; Justin Paul	Will Ferrell; Patrick Page; Sunita Mani; Tracy Morgan; The Spirited Ensemble	3:02
2.	"Present's Lament"	Pasek; Paul	Ferrell	2:02
3.	"Bringin' Back Christmas"	Pasek; Paul	Ryan Reynolds; Spirited Ensemble	3:53
4.	"The View From Here"	Pasek; Paul; Khiyon Hursey; Mark Sonnenblick; Sukari Jones	Octavia Spencer	3:06
5.	"The Story of Your Life (Marley's Haunt)"	Pasek; Paul; Hursey; Sonnenblick; Jones	Page; Reynolds	1:50
6.	"Good Afternoon"	Pasek; Paul; Hursey; Sonnenblick; Jones	Reynolds; Ferrell; Spirited Ensemble	4:27
7.	"The Story of Your Life (Clint's Pitch)"	Pasek; Paul; Hursey; Sonnenblick; Jones	Reynolds; Ferrell	1:41
8.	"Unredeemable"	Pasek; Paul	Will Ferrell; Spirited Ensemble	3:31
9.	"The View From Here (Riverwalk)"	Hursey; Sonnenblick; Jones	Spencer; Ferrell	3:01
10.	"Do A Little Good"	Pasek; Paul	Reynolds; Ferrell; Page; Mani; Morgan	3:41
11.	"That Christmas Morning Feelin' (Curtain Call)"	Pasek; Paul	Reynolds; Ferrell; Spencer; Morgan; Page; Andrea Anders; Marlow Barkley; Jen Tullock; Spirited Ensemble	2:28
12.	"Ripple (Cut Song)"	Pasek; Paul	Ferrell; Mani; Morgan; Page; Spirited Ensemble	4:07
Total length:				40:49

=== Score ===
All tracks are written by Dominic Lewis.

Spirited (Score from the Apple Original Film)
No.	Title	Length
1.	"The Graveyard Shift"	1:10
2.	"Spirited, Ltd."	3:27
3.	"Post It"	0:43
4.	"Sleigh It Ain't So"	1:05
5.	"Elf Aware"	0:36
6.	"Fa La La Lasting Impression"	0:56
7.	"Sugar and Spicy"	1:52
8.	"Snow Place Like Home"	1:04
9.	"Snow Balls in Your Court"	2:16
10.	"Christmassive Problem"	2:23
11.	"Up to Snow Good"	1:38
12.	"Huge Dickens"	1:53
13.	"We Wish You A Merry Christmas/Candy Cornucopia"	1:53
14.	"Tweets Are Tweeting"	1:14
15.	"Hospital on the Holidays"	0:39
16.	"The Question"	1:40
17.	"Shower Power"	1:29
18.	"Tinsel Talk"	1:20
19.	"Kissmas"	0:38
20.	"Elegie to Energy"	2:21
21.	"North Pole"	1:49
22.	"Race to Wren"	1:13
23.	"Didn't Post It"	0:42
24.	"Chrissapointing"	0:57
25.	"Bros"	1:33
26.	"I'm Proud of You"	1:14
27.	"Captain Clint"	2:40
28.	"Spirited"	3:24
Total length:		43:49

== Promotion and release ==
The single from the soundtrack — "Bringin' Back Christmas", performed by Ryan Reynolds and the Spirited ensemble — was released on October 14, 2022. The album was released digitally by Republic Records on November 18, 2022 and on CD through Target Corporation the same day. A 12-inch vinyl single featuring songs from Spirited was announced for Record Store Day's annual Black Friday event on November 25, 2022. It featured the songs "That Christmas Mornin' Feeling" and "Do a Little Good" on the A-side and B-sides of the disc.

== Reception ==
Alonso Duralde of TheWrap said: "All the songs, incidentally, are the product of in-demand composers Pasek & Paul, who are admittedly divisive among fans of musical theater, with credits that span 'Smash,' 'La La Land,' 'Dear Evan Hansen,' 'The Greatest Showman' and the musical version of 'A Christmas Story.' There's a bit of sameness to their work here, and overall, their compositions land better in a 'this is a musical number' context than as 'I am one character pouring out their heart.' Many of the songs here are diverting if not immediately catchy, in a score so overstuffed that one of the best songs ('Ripple') got cut from the movie and now runs alongside the closing credits [...] What really makes the numbers pop is Arnold's choreography, and she allows the ensemble of dancers to show off a variety of moves from traditional tap to splashing around in puddles to pogo-sticking to ice-skating to a sequence involving dozens of flashlights that's going to be stolen by economical high-school stage productions for decades to come. Reynolds, Ferrell and Spencer won't have Broadway calling, necessarily, but as vocalists, they definitely sell the material."

Despite giving a mixed review, Ian Sandwell of Digital Spy felt that Pasek and Paul "know their way around an instant earworm, and the likes of 'Good Afternoon' and 'That Christmas Morning Feelin'' are joyful." Maya Philips of The New York Times dismisses the musical's "pat lyrics" and "forgettable melodies" but continues, "There's Chloé Arnold's showstopping choreography at least, a dazzling combination of tap, hip-hop and jazz performed by a massive ensemble of background singers and dancers." Philips concludes that "the combination of this fine-tuned spectacle with the ineffectual vocals of the main duo—and distractingly uncanny visuals and special effects—transforms 'Spirited' into a disjointed movie musical with all the superficial trappings of a Broadway flop."

Tom Ellen of Empire wrote "in addition to being a family adventure, a high-concept fantasy and a buddy comedy, Spirited is also—somewhat inexplicably—a bona fide musical. The team behind La La Land, Benj Pasek and Justin Paul, are on song-writing duties here, though you won't find anything quite as catchy as 'City of Stars'; the tunes come thick and fast, though sometimes more 'Humbug' than hum-along." Writing for Live for Films, Becky Lima-Matthews wrote "there are a few decent earworms courtesy of La La Land and The Greatest Showman songsmiths Benj Pasek and Justin Paul, particularly the Victorian romp Good Afternoon which ties Spirited to Dickens with a wry smile and a rousing chorus."

== Accolades ==
Award	Date of ceremony	Category	Recipient(s)	Result	Ref.
Hollywood Music in Media Awards	November 16, 2022	Best Original Song in a Feature Film	"Do a Little Good" – Written by Benj Pasek and Justin Paul; Performed by Ryan Reynolds, Will Ferrell, Sunita Mani, Patrick Page and Tracy Morgan	Nominated	

== Featured Musicians in the Songs ==
- Carl Carter
- Jamie Eblen (drums)
- Justin Goldner
- Alvin Hough, Jr.
- Dillon Kondor (guitar)
- Bobby Wooten (bass)
