= Scouts Guide to the Zombie Apocalypse (soundtrack) =

Scouts Guide to the Zombie Apocalypse (Music from the Motion Picture)

Film score by Matthew Margeson
- Released: October 30, 2015
- Recorded: 2015
- Studio: Newman Scoring Stage, 20th Century Fox Studios, Los Angeles; Westside Pacific Studios, Pacific Palisades, Southern California
- Genre: Film score
- Length: 38:03
- Label: Paramount Music; La-La Land Records
- Producer: Matthew Margeson

Matthew Margeson chronology
Kingsman: The Secret Service (2015)	Scouts Guide to the Zombie Apocalypse (2015)	Eddie the Eagle (2016)

Scouts Guide to the Zombie Apocalypse (Music from the Motion Picture) is the film score to the 2015 film Scouts Guide to the Zombie Apocalypse directed by Christopher Landon starring Tye Sheridan, Logan Miller, Joey Morgan, Sarah Dumont and David Koechner. The film score is composed by Matthew Margeson and released digitally through Paramount Music and in physical formats through La-La Land Records on October 30, 2015.

== Background ==
Matthew Margeson composed the film score, after his previous collaboration with Landon on Burning Palms (2010). It was recorded at the Newman Scoring Stage in the 20th Century Fox Studios with Tim Davies conducting and orchestrating the 53-piece ensemble of the Hollywood Studio Symphony; the strings were recorded during the day and brass recorded at night. The ensemble consisted of violins, violas, cellos, strings, French horns and brasses. Andres Montero Avila, Jeremy Levy, Ryan Humphrey and Sasiwan Seiter provided additional orchestrations, while Jason Soudah composed additional music. It was recorded by Alan Meyerson, while Al Clay mixed the score at the Westside Pacific Studios.

== Release ==
The soundtrack was released digitally through Paramount Music and in physical formats through La-Land Records on October 30, 2015.

== Track listing ==
No.	Title	Length
1.	"Infection"	4:23
2.	"Yo Tengo Una Fiesta En Mis Pantalones"	2:17
3.	"A Dead Stripper Just Tried to Eat My Face"	1:53
4.	"Wheels Fall Off"	2:07
5.	"Police Station Attack"	3:08
6.	"Clumsy Augie"	1:01
7.	"Scouts Fall Apart"	2:22
8.	"What Party"	2:16
9.	"Zombie Butt Gummer"	3:58
10.	"Miss Fielder's House"	2:52
11.	"Ben's Speech"	2:00
12.	"Rave Battle"	6:16
13.	"Scouts Forever"	2:01
14.	"Night of Our Lives"	1:29
Total length:		38:03

== Reception ==
Justin Chang of Variety and Charles Gant of Screen International described the score "grand" and "exciting". Critic based at The Hollywood Reporter considered the score to be fascinating. Melissa Ann of PopHorror "seasoned music composer Matthew Margeson produced an orchestral score that was rich, intense, and chaotic. It gave me wonderful flashbacks of Return of the Living Dead at times."

== Additional music ==
The following songs are featured in the film but not included in the soundtrack:

- "Black Widow" – Performed by Iggy Azalea featuring Rita Ora
- "Air Orchestral Suite No. 3 In D Minor" – Written by Johann Sebastian Bach
- "Get Up Get Down" – Written by Peter Boyes and Oliver Silk
- "Get It Poppin'" – Performed by Kil the Giant
- "Electric Love" – Performed by Garrett Borns
- "9 to 5" – Written & performed by Dolly Parton
- 'Dee Oh U Gee Eye E" – Written by Andre Lamar Bell, Lashawn Payne & Pat Kelly
- "Young at Heart" – Performed by Tim Myers featuring Rondo Brothers
- "Get Low" – Performed by Dillon Francis and DJ Snake
- "All That" – Performed by Dillon Francis featuring Twista and The Rej3ctz
- "Scars" – Performed by Basement Jaxx
- "Crank That (Soulja Boy)" – Performed by Soulja Boy
- "...Baby One More Time" – Written by Max Martin
- "Set Me Free" – Performed by Dillon Francis and Martin Garrix
- "Burial" – Performed by Yogi featuring Pusha T
- "When We Were Young" – Performed by Dillon Francis and Sultan & Shepard featuring The Chain Gang of 1974
- "Rock You Like a Hurricane" – Performed by Scorpions
- "Haunt You" – Performed by The Pack A.D.

== Personnel ==
Credits adapted from liner notes:

- Music composer and producer – Matthew Margeson
- Additional music and arrangement – Jason Soudah
- Recording – Alan Meyerson
- Mixing – Al Clay
- Mixing assistance – Alvin Wee
- Mastering – Patricia Sullivan
- Score editor – Kevin McKeever
- Score technical engineer – Fabio Marks, Trevor Black
- Executive producer – Randy Spendlove
- Music coordinator – Jason Richmond
- Music preparation – JoAnn Kane Music Service

Orchestra

- Performer – Hollywood Studio Symphony
- Lead orchestrator and conductor – Tim Davies
- Additional orchestration – Andres Montero Avila, Jeremy Levy, Ryan Humphrey, Sasiwan Seiter
- Concertmaster – Julie Ann Gigante
- Contractor – Peter Rotter
- Protools operator – Kevin Globerman

Instruments

- Bass – Drew Dembowski, Edward Meares, Michael Valerio, Nico Carmine Abondolo, Stephen Dress
- Cello – Cecilia Tsan, Dennis Karmazyn, George Kim Scholes, Jacob Braun, Jennifer Lee Kuhn, Paula Hochhalter, Trevor Handy, Steve Erdody
- French horn – Daniel Kelley, Jenny Kim, Steven Becknell, Mark Adams
- Oboe – Chris Bleth
- Trombone – William Reichenbach, Craig Gosnell, Steven Holtman, Alexander Iles
- Trumpet – Daniel Rosenboom, Wayne Bergeron, Jon Lewis
- Tuba – Doug Tornquist
- Viola – Andrew Duckles, Darrin McCann, Robert Brophy, Shawn Mann, Victoria Miskolczy, Brian Dembow
- Violin – Ana Landauer, Bruce Dukov, Charlie Bisharat, Darius Campo, Eun-Mee Ahn, Helen Nightengale, Irina Voloshina, Jessica Guideri, Josefina Vergara, Katia Popov, Kevin Connolly, Lisa Liu, Lisa Sutton, Natalie Leggett, Rafael Rishik, Serena McKinney, Shalini Vijayan, Songa Lee, Tamara Hatwan, Alyssa Park

== Accolades ==
Awards	Category	Reciipent(s) and nominee(s)	Result	Ref.
International Film Music Critics Association	Best Original Score for a Fantasy/Science Fiction/Horror Film	Matthew Margeson	Nominated	
