= Bullet Train (soundtrack) =

2022 soundtrack album by various artists

Bullet Train (Original Motion Picture Soundtrack)

Soundtrack album by various artists
- Released: August 3, 2022
- Genre: Pop; jazz; rock; EDM; heavy metal
- Length: 45:59
- Label: Arista Records

Bullet Train (Original Motion Picture Score)

Film score by Dominic Lewis
- Released: August 5, 2022
- Genre: Film score
- Length: 56:17
- Label: Milan Records
- Producer: Dominic Lewis

Dominic Lewis chronology
The King's Man (2021)	Bullet Train (2022)	Spirited (2022)

Bullet Train (Original Motion Picture Soundtrack) is the soundtrack album to the 2022 film of the same name. The album was released by Arista Records on August 3, 2022, featuring a collection of incorporated songs, mostly using Japanese music for the film to suit the film's setting in Japan. Dominic Lewis composed the film score, having worked for nearly a year during the COVID-19 pandemic. He used multiple instruments and also performed solo vocals, for few of the score cues. The score consisted of Japanese music, incorporated with rock, pop, metal and EDM. The score was released under a separate album Bullet Train (Original Motion Picture Score) by Milan Records on August 5. The music received praise from critics, as an "integral part of the film's storyline".

== Background ==
Lewis wrote the score for Bullet Train for a year during the COVID-19 pandemic lockdown, and used various instruments, including keyboards, bass, guitars and also performing solo vocals. He described the score as "raw and messy" and added "It's all vibe and no technique. That's a lot of what rock ‘n’ roll is about. It's about attitude, and I really wanted to convey that." The additional vocals in the background were performed by an enka singer, which Lewis described as "it is so unique in its style" and the vibrato is "so emotional", being the only nod to traditional Japanese music. He also employed a 70-piece orchestra at the Sony Scoring Stage in Culver City, California.

In addition to composing the score, he also produced and co-wrote some of the songs incorporated in the film. The album featured mostly Japanese music, to suit the sensibilities of the film's setting. The Bee Gees' single "Stayin' Alive" (1977) is featured in the promotional materials, and also in the film, with phrases re-worded and written in Japanese. The track was performed by Queen Bee's lead vocalist Avu-chan. Bonnie Tyler's single "Holding Out for a Hero" (1984) is also covered by Miki Asakura, featuring similar Japanese lyrics. "Kill Me Pretty" by Unicorn's Tamio Okuda, was considered Lewis' fate theme which was done in a "70's rock vibe". Some of the Japanese pop songs from the 1960s are used including, Kyu Sakamoto's "Sukiyaki" and Carmen Maki's "Tokiniwa Haha No Naiko No Youni".

Some songs were acted as themes for the characters, which are: "La Despedida" by Alejandro Sanz as the theme for the Wolf (Bad Bunny), "My Time to Shine" performed by Upsahl as the theme for Prince (Joey King). Lewis also co-produced the song "I'm Forever Blowing Bubbles" performed by pop-singer Engelbert Humperdinck. In the film he had spotted the sticker of West Ham United F.C., on the back of Tangerine's (Aaron Taylor-Johnson) cellphone, and the track was the theme of the film. He collaborated with Humperdinck and the song was recorded at Capitol Studios, where he added popular music genres varying from the synths, to grunge-rock spanning from the 1960s to 1990s. He also wrote the children's television show-style theme for the character Momomon in costume, and with the help of the orchestra, he recorded the entire instrumentation through a tape machine to give "a classic-vintage feel".

== Track listing ==
=== Bullet Train (Original Motion Picture Soundtrack) ===
No.	Title	Singer(s)	Length
1.	"Stayin' Alive"	Avu-chan	5:49
2.	"Power"	Siiickbrain; Pussy Riot	2:57
3.	"I'm Forever Blowing Bubbles"	Engelbert Humperdinck	1:56
4.	"La Despedida"	Alejandro Sanz	3:57
5.	"My Time to Shine"	Upsahl	2:35
6.	"Kill Me Pretty"	Tamio Okuda	2:40
7.	"Couple of Fruits"	The Bigfellas	2:09
8.	"Tokiniwa Haha No Naiko No Youni"	Carmen Maki	3:23
9.	"Sweet Thang"	Shuggie Otis	4:12
10.	"Five Hundred Miles"	Song For Memories	3:41
11.	"Holding Out for a Hero (Dance Version)"	Miki Asakura	4:54
12.	"Sukiyaki"	Kyu Sakamoto	3:08
13.	"I Just Want to Celebrate"	Rare Earth	3:40
14.	"Momomon"	Dominic Lewis	0:59
Total length:			45:59

=== Bullet Train (Original Motion Picture Score) ===
No.	Title	Length
1.	"The White Death"	2:27
2.	"All Aboard"	2:21
3.	"Prince"	1:07
4.	"A Modern Plague"	1:55
5.	"Royally f#*ked"	1:35
6.	"MacGyver"	1:26
7.	"Yuichi"	1:46
8.	"Toilet Talk"	3:30
9.	"Tang Fight"	1:57
10.	"Daddy Issues"	0:46
11.	"Fructose Overdose"	1:13
12.	"The Hornet Stings"	2:16
13.	"Bubbles"	2:08
14.	"You’re the Diesel"	2:34
15.	"Backpack"	0:51
16.	"Polythene Pam"	2:06
17.	"Tentomushi"	4:15
18.	"Kyoto Eki"	1:39
19.	"Dochka"	2:56
20.	"Mr. Death"	5:20
21.	"Anuvva Bruvva"	1:57
22.	"Make or Brake"	3:21
23.	"Not Carver"	1:12
24.	"Fate"	5:38
Total length:		56:17

== Reception ==
Even before the release of the soundtrack, it was highly anticipated by fans, with The A.V. Club calling it as a "kick-ass" soundtrack. Critical reviews praised the music and its integration into the screenplay, and editing. Cezary Jan Strusiewicz of Tokyo Weekender, reports that unlike most of Leitch's filmography, "music plays a big part in the film, with a lot of the players and the action moving to the beat of the soundtrack," and compares it to the 2021 Western film The Harder They Fall with "everything occasionally feeling like a big-budget music video." The Quad wrote that the soundtrack "gives depth to the fantastic fight scenes". Critic Jake Fritzelgard had said "A massive strong point of Bullet Train is in its music, a unique score coupled with a soundtrack that has everything from a Japanese cover of Bonnie Tyler to an end credits track that sounds like Greta Van Fleet taking on Industrial metal."

Filmtracks.com praised Lewis' score, saying "Don't expect these melodies to carry any semblance of a satisfying narrative in Bullet Train, for the structures here are of minimal importance compared to the style of performance and the distortion of the final mix. Anyone seeking a sane listening experience should be careful with this unruly romp. Ideally, the album presentation would place the songs and score in chronological order to recreate the film's extremely unique use of music. Lewis clearly had a ton of fun with this movie, and the score demands an equally irreverent mood to appreciate out of context." Pete Hammond of Deadline Hollywood called the score as "sharp", while Hagan Osborne of The Curb had stated "The film finds buzzing energy in Dominic Lewis’ score, with the notable stand-out piece occurring in one tense reveal feeling straight out of a Mario Kart course."
