= Peter Rabbit 2: The Runaway (soundtrack) =

Peter Rabbit 2: The Runaway (Original Motion Picture Score)

Film score by Dominic Lewis
- Released: June 18, 2021
- Genre: Film score
- Length: 36:20
- Label: Madison Gate Records
- Producer: Dominic Lewis

Dominic Lewis chronology
My Spy (2020)	Peter Rabbit 2: The Runaway (2021)	Jolt (2021)

Peter Rabbit 2: The Runaway (Original Motion Picture Score) is the film score soundtrack to the 2021 film Peter Rabbit 2: The Runaway directed by Will Gluck, which is the sequel to Peter Rabbit (2018). The film score was composed by Dominic Lewis and released through Madison Gate Records on June 18, 2021.

== Development ==
Dominic Lewis who composed music for Peter Rabbit returned to score the sequel in February 2020. Usually, Lewis would join the sequel of the film where he was not involved in the first film (Goosebumps 2: Haunted Halloween and The King's Man, where he was not involved in scoring the predecessors), but as Lewis had also involved in the first film, his return to The Runaway felt like to "coming back to family". Lewis visited the sets of the film while he was scoring for The King's Man and discussed with Gluck on the musical prospects. Unlike the first film, the sequel featured less songs and more instrumental cues, and Lewis went ahead with the blend of musical and orchestral approach as with the first film. Lewis also developed new themes for the new characters and revisited on the old themes.

The Runaway was set in a different location, which helped Lewis to adapt the thematic material which would basically change the orchestration and instrumentation providing a new flavor, as well as revisit the themes and interweave the newer themes for the new characters into the pre–existing material. Lewis called "The Fast and the Furriest" as the most fun he had on working in theme, a "terrible pun" on the Fast & Furious franchise. As the film released during the same month as F9, the ninth instalment in the franchise, both films in the end had a "big kind of wrap–up of lots of adventure — jumping out of planes and they're on a boat and on a motorcycle and in a DB9 and skiing in the Alps". Thus, the montage had him explore his favorite genres of action music whilst intertwining the original as well as new themes.

== Track listing ==
No.	Title	Length
1.	"The Best of Times"	1:17
2.	"Hip Hop, Foxtrot"	2:37
3.	"Travel to Gloucester"	2:29
4.	"Fruit Lady"	0:54
5.	"The Worst of Times"	2:17
6.	"Fridge Raid"	2:36
7.	"Frolicking"	1:32
8.	"Trenchcoat"	1:13
9.	"Toys, Tales and Town Mice"	1:34
10.	"Take Care of Him"	1:12
11.	"Get the Farmers"	3:30
12.	"Cheese Escape"	1:52
13.	"Pet Shop Bunnies"	2:47
14.	"Father Figure"	1:46
15.	"I'll Take My Chances"	1:53
16.	"The Fast and the Furriest"	4:15
17.	"Rabbit Through the Hole"	2:36
Total length:		36:20

== Reception ==
Christopher Garner of Movie Music UK wrote "All the themes Lewis came up with for this score are good, and I far prefer the sound of this score to what he wrote for the first film. The heist-style music in the score is well done (I'm sure Lewis could pull off a convincing Mission: Impossible or James Bond score if ever given the chance). The brevity of the scores means it doesn't outstay its welcome, but it also means that the score is somewhat fleeting. There's not quite enough time with any of the themes to make them really stick in the mind once it's all over. Still, what's here is well done, and a pleasant way to pass half an hour." Courtney Howard of Variety and Michael Rechtshaffen of The Hollywood Reporter described it as "outright fun" and "exciting".

== Additional music ==
The film also featured the following songs, which were not included in the soundtrack:

- "Bridal Chorus" – Richard Wagner
- "Run Runaway" – Slade
- "Perfume" – Jones Jnr.
- "Boulevard of Broken Dreams" – Green Day
- "Got Me Singing Like" – Jay Levels x ClickNPress
- "That's Not My Name" – The Ting Tings
- "Alright" – Supergrass
- "3 Nights" – Dominic Fike
- "Harmony Hall" – Vampire Weekend
- "I Need Help!" – Fitz and the Tantrums
- "Down by the Bay" – Raffi
- "Come Together Now" – Matt and Kim
- "She Moves In Her Own Way" – The Kooks
- "London Bridge Is Falling Down" – Traditional
- "Up Up Up" – Givers
