= Pixels (soundtrack) =

Pixels (Original Motion Picture Soundtrack)

Film score by Henry Jackman
- Released: July 24, 2015
- Recorded: 2014–2015
- Studio: Sony Scoring Stage, Sony Pictures Studios
- Genre: Film score
- Length: 38:10
- Label: Varèse Sarabande
- Producer: Henry Jackman

Henry Jackman chronology
Kingsman: The Secret Service (2015)	Pixels (2015)	The 5th Wave (2016)

Pixels (Original Motion Picture Soundtrack) is the film score soundtrack album to the 2015 film Pixels directed by Chris Columbus. The film's musical score was composed by Henry Jackman, conducted by Nick Glennie-Smith, performed by the Hollywood Studio Symphony and released under the Varèse Sarabande record label on July 24, 2015.

== Development ==
The film score is composed by Henry Jackman, who collaborated with Chris Columbus for the first time. Jackman was provided the script much before working on the film's music and enjoyed its concept. He then played few bits of music to Columbus, who also liked Jackman's demos. He recalled that, since he had previously scored Disney's Wreck-It Ralph (2012), which was completely different as a sort of thematic relation that it involves video games, Columbus felt that he was on his radar which led him to be a part of the film.

Jackman refrained from using 8-bit music as he previously did with in Wreck-It Ralph; since he had those iconic images and sound effects of the game he had in mind, the approach "made the whole thing pretty silly" and instead went ahead with a symphonic approach thereby ensuring to get the themes right and coherently plan with the melodies and harmonies. Traditionally, Jackman would play those themes on the piano as he would do with most orchestral scores and then develop the orchestration and instrumentation. Columbus, besides providing suggestions and guidance, would never interfere on Jackman's composition process, which made the sessions so coherent and creative.

Columbus emphasized on the orchestral symphony being used should pay homage to the 1980s blockbusters such as Star Wars (1977), Raiders of the Lost Ark (1981) and E.T. the Extra-Terrestrial (1982). Jackman put together a combination of synth and orchestral elements, influenced by the production of classic film scores such as Close Encounters of the Third Kind (1977) and Ghostbusters (1984). Jackman stated "the important part is the invasion part, and, right towards the end of the film, as an echo from the first invasion, you get the full on invasion of hundreds of thousands of these arcade characters running amok in New York City" and besides being "goofy", the theme was closer to "The Imperial March". He then pitched to Columbus on treating the final invasion as something that would feel like Stormtroopers flooding the rebel base, without the comical nature.

An original theme song titled "Game On" performed by Waka Flocka Flame and featuring Good Charlotte was released in June 2015, although it was not included in the film's soundtrack. Varèse Sarabande released the score soundtrack on July 24, 2015, the same day as the film.

The Japanese version has a different theme song, titled "8-bit Boy" by Mito Natsume.

== Reception ==
James Southall of Movie Wave wrote "the themes are there but just aren't that distinctive. Still, there's certainly entertainment here and it's all great fun, so it's definitely worth checking out if you're a fan of the style." Pete Simons of Synchrotones wrote "if you're not bothered by those things that bother me than Pixels should be a nice follow-up to Kingsman, offering a slick and bold orchestral score, with a handful of themes and rich orchestrations." The score was shortlisted as one among the 112 contenders of Best Original Score category at the 88th Academy Awards.

== Track listing ==
No.	Title	Length
1.	"Invasion"	1:31
2.	"The Arcaders"	0:55
3.	"To The White House"	1:28
4.	"Conspiracy Theory"	1:34
5.	"Level 2"	0:40
6.	"Hand-Eye Coordination"	1:27
7.	"Centipede"	3:01
8.	"Pest Control"	0:37
9.	"Call In The Cavalry"	2:03
10.	"Unconditional Love"	1:21
11.	"Power Up"	1:33
12.	"Gobble Or Be Gobbled"	2:59
13.	"Trophy For The Victors"	1:04
14.	"Sweet Spot"	2:24
15.	"Q Bert"	1:03
16.	"Shoot ‘Em Up"	1:53
17.	"A Dream Come True"	1:42
18.	"Mothership"	1:51
19.	"Roll Out The Barrels"	5:28
20.	"High Score"	2:03
21.	"Arcaders '82"	1:33
Total length:		38:10

== Personnel ==
Credits adapted from liner notes

Music composed and produced by Henry Jackman

Instruments

- Bass – Edward Meares
- Bassoon – Rose Corrigan
- Cello – Steve Erdody
- Clarinet – Stuart Clark
- Flute – Geri Rotella
- French horn – David Everson
- Guitar – Daniel Pinder, George Doering
- Harp – Jo Ann Turovsky
- Keyboards – Randy Kerber
- Oboe – Lara Wickes
- Percussion – Wade Culbreath
- Trombone – Alexander Iles
- Trumpet – Jon Lewis
- Tuba – Doug Tornquist
- Viola – Darrin McCann, Brian Dembow
- Violin – Alyssa Park, Amy Hershberger, Andrew Bulbrook, Benjamin Powell, Benjamin Jacobson, Charlie Bisharat, Darius Campo, Eun-Mee Ahn, Grace Oh, Helen Nightengale, Irina Voloshina, Jacqueline Brand, Jay Rosen, Jessica Guideri, Josefina Vergara, Mary Sloan, Katia Popov, Lisa Liu, Lisa Sutton, Lorenz Gamma, Maia Jasper, Marc Sazer, Natalie Leggett, Neil Samples, Phillip Levy, Radu Pieptea, Rafael Rishik, Roberto Cani, Serena Mc Kinney, Songa Lee, Tamara Hatwan, Trevor Handy, Yelena Yegoryan, Julie Gigante

Choir

- Alto – Aleta Braxton, Amy Fogerson, Jessica Rotter, Kasondra Kazanjian, Kimberly Switzer, Kristen Toedtman, Leanna Brand, Lesley Leighton, Marijke Van Niekerk, Nancy Sulahian, Nike St. Clair, Sarah Lynch
- Bass – Abdiel Gonzalez, Chris Mann, Dylan Gentile, Gregg Geiger, Jim Campbell, Reid Bruton, Scott Graff, Will Goldman
- Soprano – Anna Schubert, Christina Bristow, Cindy O'Connor, Claire Fedoruk, Elissa Johnston, Harriet Fraser, Hayden Eberhart, Holly Sedillos, Karen Hogle Brown, Karen Whipple Schnurr, Suzanne Waters, Tamara Bevard
- Tenor – AJ Teshin, Daniel Chaney, Matt Brown, Michael Lichtenauer, Shawn Kirchner, Timothy Gonzales, Todd S. Honeycutt, Todd Strange
