= Free Birds =

2013 animated film by Jimmy Hayward

- Theatrical release poster
- Directed by: Jimmy Hayward
- Screenplay by: Jimmy Hayward; Scott Mosier
- Story by: David I. Stern; John J. Strauss
- Produced by: Scott Mosier
- Starring: Owen Wilson; Woody Harrelson; Amy Poehler; George Takei; Colm Meaney; Keith David; Dan Fogler
- Edited by: Chris Cartagena
- Music by: Dominic Lewis
- Production company: Reel FX Animation Studios
- Distributed by: Relativity Media
- Release date: November 1, 2013
- Running time: 91 minutes
- Country: United States
- Language: English
- Budget: $55 million
- Box office: $110 million

Free Birds is a 2013 American animated science fiction comedy film directed by Jimmy Hayward, who co-wrote the screenplay with the film's producer Scott Mosier. The film stars the voices of Owen Wilson, Woody Harrelson, Amy Poehler, George Takei, Colm Meaney, Keith David, and Dan Fogler. In the film, two turkeys named Reggie and Jake go back in time to the first Thanksgiving to take turkeys off of the holiday’s menu.

Free Birds was produced by Reel FX Creative Studios as its 7th full-length animated feature film and Relativity Media as its 4th animated film after Monster House (2006), The Tale of Despereaux (2008), and 9 (2009). Originally titled Turkeys, and scheduled for 2014, the film was released by Relativity Media on November 1, 2013.

Free Birds grossed $110 million worldwide against a $55 million budget and received negative reviews from critics, but has since gained a cult following. The film was nominated for the Annie Award for Outstanding Achievement for Music in a Feature Production.

== Plot ==
In the present day, a turkey named Reggie, who lives on a free-range farm, always worries about Thanksgiving because turkeys are the main dish, and his attempts to warn his ignorant flock have made him an outcast. When the President of the United States arrives at the farm for the National Thanksgiving Turkey Presentation, which the flock mistakes for the farmer taking them all to kill, they throw Reggie outside of the coop in order to save themselves. The president's daughter finds him and decides that he should be dubbed the pardoned turkey, going as far as to pretend to cry in order to get the press to agree with her.

When Reggie is taken to Camp David, he eases into a life of pizza and watching Spanish telenovelas. One night, however, he is abducted by a turkey named Jake who claims to have been instructed by a being called the “Great Turkey" with the “Sacred Time Knob” to take Reggie and go back in time to the first Thanksgiving to get turkeys off the menu. They steal a time machine controlled by an AI called S.T.E.V.E. (Space Time Exploration Vehicle Envoy) from a government facility and time-travel to three days before the first Thanksgiving in 1621.

When they arrive, they are ambushed by Pilgrims but rescued by a flock of turkeys who are led by Broadbeak. The flock used to live in trees but were forced to move underground when the Pilgrims arrived in Plymouth. Broadbeak assigns Reggie and his daughter Jenny to spring the Pilgrims' turkey traps while Jake and her brother Ranger spy on the Pilgrims.

Jake and Ranger discover that the Pilgrims setting up preparations for Thanksgiving with their weapons shack. Meanwhile, Jenny does not believe Reggie is actually from the future, although is impressed with his accidental way of springing traps. They are intercepted by Myles Standish but Reggie sends Jenny into orbit aboard S.T.E.V.E., validating his story. He suggests going to the future with him but she refuses to leave the flock.

Jake tells Reggie about his backstory and assigned mission. Growing up inside a factory farm, every member of his family fattened up on formula as chicks, except for him, because his mother kept him hidden from worker scientists. One night, she tasked him with escaping with a clutch of eggs in order to start his own flock. He managed to escape, but the eggs were taken by the scientists. Shortly afterward, the Great Turkey appeared and gave him his mission. Jake believes that stopping turkeys from becoming Thanksgiving dinners will make up for his failure to his family.

Reggie reluctantly goes along with Jake's plan to attack the Pilgrims. They destroy the weapons shack and rescue Ranger's friends who did not escape, Amos and Furley. However, Jake accidentally leaves a trail of gunpowder to the flock's home with a stolen powder horn from Standish. The Pilgrims capture enough of the flock for Thanksgiving, then set fire to the tree in an attempt to flush the rest out. Jake redeems himself by rescuing the hatchlings and unhatched eggs from the tree and Broadbeak sacrifices his life to help the remaining turkeys escape.

The following morning, the members of the flock who managed to avoid getting caught by the Pilgrims hold a funeral for Broadbeak. Feeling that he has let the flock down, Reggie returns to the present, where he discovers from S.T.E.V.E. and three alternate versions of himself that he is the Great Turkey. Reggie time-travels to the night that Jake let down his family in order to send him on his mission with a golden doorknob from Camp David to dub the Sacred Time Knob. Jenny becomes the new leader of the flock after the half-shell that once belonged to Broadbeak fits her half and orders the remaining turkeys to prepare an attack on Plymouth Colony.

Jake, Jenny and Ranger lead the attack on Plymouth Colony just as the Wampanoags arrive. Reggie returns to 1621 to stop the attack, inadvertently trapping Standish in the time stream. Through S.T.E.V.E. and a pizza delivery man, Reggie convinces the Pilgrims and Wampanoags that pizza is a better Thanksgiving food than turkeys, excluding their kind from the tradition. He decides to stay in 1621 while Jake and S.T.E.V.E. look for new adventures.

In a mid-credits scene, Jake returns with S.T.E.V.E to Reggie and Jenny just two seconds after his departure holding a duck and a chicken, inquiring about the existence of a turducken.

== Voice cast ==
- Owen Wilson as Reggie, a domestic turkey who is pardoned by the President of the United States and is dragged into Jake's plot.
- Woody Harrelson as Jake, a wild turkey who is the president of the Turkey Freedom Front (T.F.F.).
- Amy Poehler as Jenny, a wild turkey who is Reggie's love interest, and later the chief of the native turkeys.
- George Takei as the Space Time Exploration Vehicle Envoy (S.T.E.V.E.), an artificial intelligence of the time machine, shaped like a giant egg.
- Colm Meaney as Captain Myles Standish, a military officer and the Pilgrims' military advisor.
- Keith David as Chief Broadbeak, the chief of the native turkeys and Jenny and Ranger's father.
- Dan Fogler as Governor William Bradford, the governor of Plymouth Colony.
- Jimmy Hayward as:
  - Ranger, Jenny's brother, Jake's rival, and the son of Chief Broadbeak.
  - The President of the United States
  - Leatherbeak, an elderly turkey who is Broadbeak's trusted advisor.
  - Hazmats
- Kaitlyn Maher as The President's Daughter
- Carlos Alazraqui as Amos, a member of Broadbeak's tribe who speaks with a Spanish accent.
- Jeff Biancalana as:
  - General Sagan
  - Hazmats
- Danny Carey as Danny, a member of Broadbeak's tribe who has long hair.
- Carlos Ponce as:
  - Mundo del Amor Narrator
  - Alejandro, the protagonist of Mundo del Amor.
- Robert Beltran as Chief Massasoit, the leader of the Wampanoags.
- Lesley Nicol as Pilgrim Woman
- Jason Finazzo as Chrononaut One
- Scott Mosier as Pizza Dude, an unnamed pizza delivery man
- Lauren Bowles as Jake's Mother
- Dwight Howard as Cold Turkey, a member of Broadbeak's tribe who wears a headband.
- Vincente DiSanti as:
  - Old Woman
  - Mr. Anchovy

Additional voices by Jeff Biancalana, Jason Finazzo, Jimmy Hayward, Josh Lawson, and Scott Mosier.

== Production ==
Development on the film, originally titled Turkeys, began in June 2009, and physical production began in January 2011. Ren & Stimpy creator John Kricfalusi was involved in early development, and posted the concepts he created for the film on his blog. Reel FX and Granat Entertainment launched in 2010, Bedrock Studios (later renamed to Reel FX Animation Studios) to produce sub-$35 million family-oriented projects. The film originally had a more comedic plot, utilizing the animation and art styles that Reel FX had done for their 2010 CGI Looney Tunes shorts. The plot was also planned to have two additional characters: Buck McDonald (voiced by Luke Wilson), who was supposed to be the first person to travel through time, before being dropped in favor of Reggie and Jake (then named Brock); and a cybernetic pig from the future, who would hunt down the turkeys and prevent them from accomplishing their mission. Ash Brannon was then set to direct the film, with Vincente DiSanti hired as the director's assistant, story coordinator, and editorial coordinator. The characters were designed by Andy Bialk.

In October 2012, it was announced that Relativity Media would co-finance, co-produce, and distribute the film. Studio executives were not satisfied with the film's direction and cartoonish look, so the plot was given a more serious tone, Brannon was fired, and Jimmy Hayward took over the directing position. Reel FX was also told by Relativity Media to cut scenes with "sexual tension" between Reggie and Jake. Originally scheduled for November 14, 2014, the film was moved up by a year to November 1, 2013, due to the vacant slot left after the delay of DreamWorks Animation's Mr. Peabody & Sherman. In March 2013, the film was retitled to Free Birds. Dell provided technology and IT infrastructure to Reel FX for use in the film's production. Animators and artists used the software Avian to produce the turkey characters' feathers.

Free Birds

Soundtrack album by Dominic Lewis
- Released: October 29, 2013
- Recorded: 2013
- Genre: Film score
- Length: 64:45
- Label: Relativity Music Group
- Producer: Dominic Lewis

Dominic Lewis film scores chronology
Dragons: Gift of the Night Fury (2011)	Free Birds (2013)	The Duff (2015)

Singles from Free Birds: Original Motion Picture Soundtrack
- 1. "Up Around the Bend" Released: 2013

The film's score was originally set to be composed by Steve Martin, with one of Martin's demos having vocals performed by Leonard Nimoy. Martin left when the film was pushed toward a more serious direction, so the score was instead composed by Dominic Lewis. The soundtrack was released by Relativity Music Group on October 29, 2013.

== Marketing ==
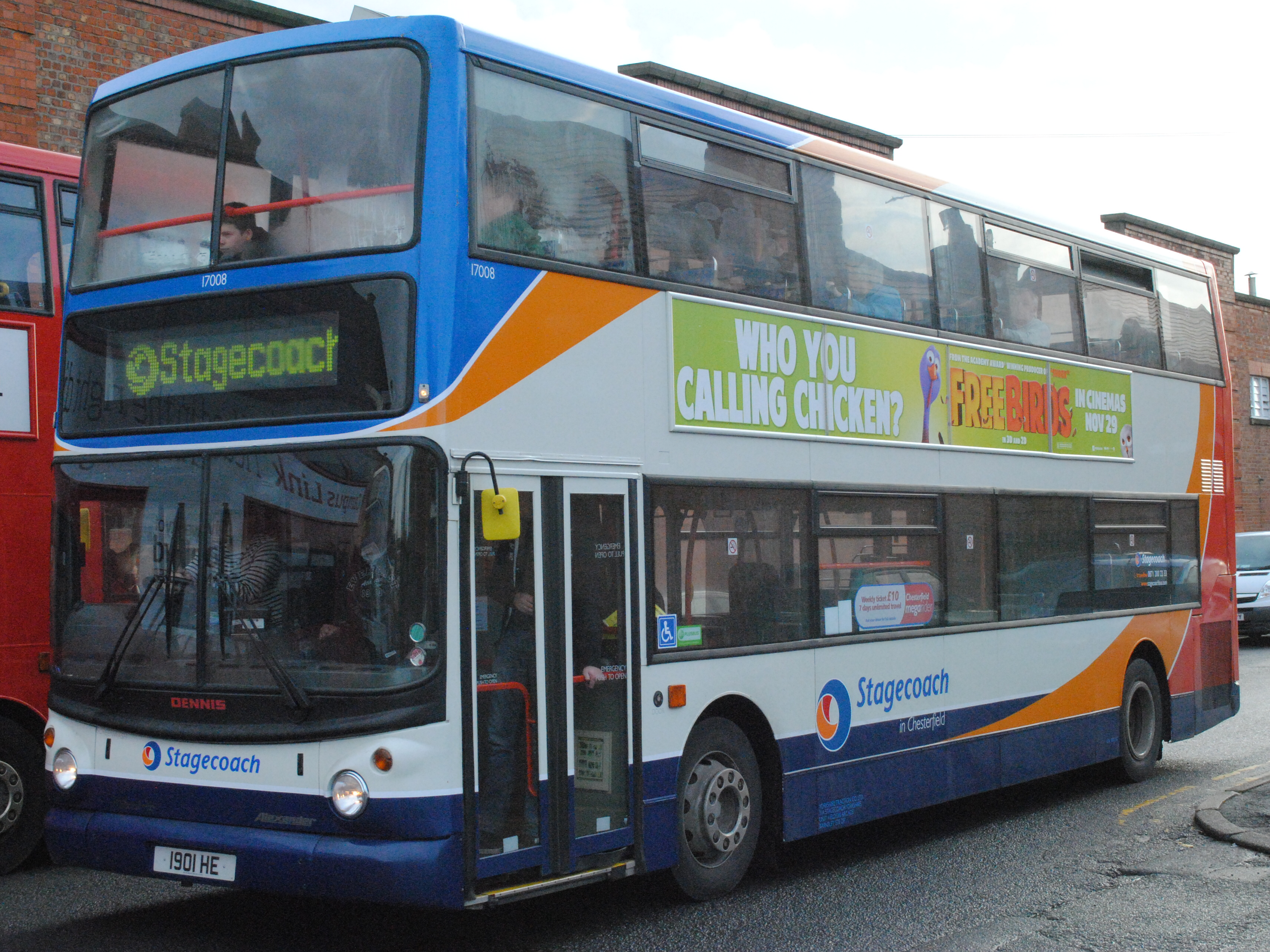
A bus advertising the film in England

Relativity Media teamed up with four major companies to promote Free Birds, including Kidz Bop, Old Navy, Auntie Anne's, and Chuck E. Cheese, who released free snap bands to promote the film. Relativity Media also sponsored rapper and singer MattyBRaps with a music video called "Back in Time", posted on his YouTube channel on September 30, 2013. Little Zoo Studio created marketing material for the film's release.

== Reception ==
=== Critical response ===
On Rotten Tomatoes, the film has an approval rating of 20% based on 91 reviews and an average rating of 4.3/10. The critics consensus reads: "Technically proficient yet creatively moribund, Free Birds begs unfortunate comparisons with the dim-witted fowl that inspired it." On Metacritic, the film has a score of 38 out of 100 based on reviews from 27 critics, indicating "generally unfavorable" reviews. Audiences polled by CinemaScore gave the film an average grade of "A−" on an A+ to F scale.

Justin Chang of Variety gave the film a negative review, saying "This seemingly innocuous toon fantasy becomes another noxious-but-sanitized exercise in family-friendly cultural insensitivity." Alonso Duralde of The Wrap gave the film a negative review, saying "Even setting aside the film's disregard for time-travel paradoxes and genocide metaphors—trust me, you don't want to wade into either of those—Free Birds just isn't funny." Stephanie Zacharek of The Village Voice gave the film a negative review, saying "Like so many modern animated features, Free Birds packs too much in; the picture feels cramped and cluttered, and, despite its occasionally manic action, it moves as slowly as a fattened bird waddling toward its doom." Kate Erbland of Film.com gave the film a 7.6 out of 10, saying "Free Birds is a more than worthy (and weird) holiday diversion for the whole family." Stephan Lee of Entertainment Weekly gave the film a C, saying "Often, you can point to a middling animated film's visuals as its saving grace. But this colonial world, which should feel like an expansive autumnal panorama, feels oddly inert and two-dimensional." Claudia Puig of USA Today gave the film two and a half stars out of four, saying "The 3-D animated film, the first of the holiday entries, is likable and amusing, if slight." Chris Cabin of Slant Magazine gave the film one out of four stars, saying "The film is absent of humor and thrills, and accented with designs and color schemes that are equally notable for their lack of risk."

Sheri Linden of the Los Angeles Times gave the film a negative review, saying "Like the ungainly avian creatures at the center of the herky-jerky adventure, this 'toon seldom gets off the ground." Jessica Herndon of the Associated Press gave the film two out of four stars, saying "A solid premiere effort that shows Reel FX's potential to produce quality full-length animation. But the storyline, with its hypothetical constituents, seems a little desperate at times, even for a kiddie film." Linda Barnard of the Toronto Star gave the film one out of four stars, calling the film "A seasonally pegged 3D cartoon bore that sets the bar so low, it could give a slug a concussion." Tom Russo of The Boston Globe gave the film two out of four stars, calling the film "A welcome foray into underexploited territory, conceptually at least." Bill Goodykoontz of The Arizona Republic gave the film two out of five stars, saying "It isn't cute. It isn't really funny. It just kind of is." Louis Black of The Austin Chronicle gave the film one and a half stars out of five, saying "Free Birds falls flat, despite its good intentions, ideological cuteness, humorous polish, and skillful computer animation. The fine voice talents of the almost-ideal cast are wasted." Elizabeth Weitzman of the New York Daily News gave the film two out of five stars, saying "Most minor animated movies are so rote that it's worth acknowledging a strange bird like this cheerfully gonzo kid flick. It's no masterpiece, but if you're hoping for a family film that will keep everyone reasonably entertained, this will fly."

Miriam Bale of The New York Times gave the film a negative review, saying "The concept is inane, and the execution is manic and unoriginal." Sara Stewart of the New York Post gave the film one and a half stars out of four, saying "Is Hollywood scheming to turn your little ones into strident vegetarians? Could be, but I wish they'd do it with material more inspired than Free Birds, a forgettable—and occasionally borderline offensive—animated tale of turkeys trying to take back Thanksgiving." David Hiltbrand of The Philadelphia Inquirer gave the film one and a half stars out of four, saying "Free Birds is a stale turkey hash that heaves a lot of ingredients in the oven but never turns on the gas, a frantic attempt to come up with an animated film built around Thanksgiving Day traditions." Liam Lacey of The Globe and Mail gave the film one and a half stars out of four, saying "The movie's animal rights, vegetarian message should go down easily with politically correct parents—at least until they choke on the offensive depiction of 17th-century turkeys as face-painted, headband-wearing native Americans." Stephanie Merry of The Washington Post gave the film two and a half stars out of four, saying "Finally, there's a movie vegetarian parents can enjoy with their impressionable offspring." Peter Hartlaub of the San Francisco Chronicle gave the film one out of four stars, saying "In execution, the film is all sidekicks and sight gags, with little story cohesion or purpose." Mark Kermode gave the film a negative review and found the film to be lacking in creativity and originality. Kermode pointed out that the movie's premise, involving turkeys traveling back in time to change the course of Thanksgiving, was not executed well. He thought that the humor fell flat and that the animation was not up to par with other contemporary acclaimed animated films to other films involving turkeys since Chicken Run and later said of the film "Anyone who's seen Chicken Run will wonder why they're not enjoying a well-constructed Aardman animation rather than attempting to make sense of this incoherent transatlantic trifle.".

Bill Zwecker of the Chicago Sun-Times gave the film a mixed review, saying "No, Free Birds is not (sorry) a turkey of a film. But it doesn't really soar terribly high either. I only wish the quality of the writing in the earlier parts of the movie had been maintained throughout. If that had been the case, Reggie, Jake and their fellow turkeys just might have been flying high with the eagles—our official national birds." Michael Rechtshaffen of The Hollywood Reporter gave the film a mixed review, saying "Although it seldom approaches the inspiration of its plucky premise—a pair of turkeys travel back in a time machine to the first Thanksgiving in a bid to scratch the traditional entree off the menu—Free Birds nevertheless manages to avoid being branded a holiday turkey." Christy Lemire of RogerEbert.com gave the film one and a half stars out of four, saying "Everything about Free Birds feels perfunctory, from its generic title and holiday setting to its starry voice cast and undistinguished use of 3-D."

=== Box office ===
Free Birds grossed $55,750,480 in North America, and $54,400,000 in other countries, for a worldwide total of $110,150,480. In North America, the film opened to number four in its first weekend, with $15,805,237, behind Ender's Game, Jackass Presents: Bad Grandpa and Last Vegas. In its second weekend, the film moved up to number three, grossing an additional $11,112,063. In its third weekend, the film dropped to number four, grossing $8,106,151. In its fourth weekend, the film dropped to number five, grossing $5,363,208.

=== Home media ===
Free Birds was released on DVD and Blu-ray on February 4, 2014, by 20th Century Fox Home Entertainment.

== Legacy ==
Almost a decade after its release, Free Birds started to garner a cult following. This was also around the time a scene in which Jake proclaims to Reggie, "We're going back in time to the first Thanksgiving to get turkeys off the menu," then repeats it to the viewer, became a popular Internet meme.
