= Karate Kid: Legends (soundtrack) =

Karate Kid: Legends (Original Motion Picture Soundtrack)

Film score by Dominic Lewis
- Released: May 30, 2025
- Recorded: 2025
- Genre: Film score
- Length: 53:49
- Label: Milan
- Producer: Dominic Lewis

Dominic Lewis chronology
Love Hurts (2025)	Karate Kid: Legends (2025)	Nobody 2 (2025)

Karate Kid: Legends (Original Motion Picture Soundtrack) is the film score to the 2025 film Karate Kid: Legends; the sixth film in The Karate Kid franchise, serving as a continuation of The Karate Kid (2010) and the television series Cobra Kai (2018–2025). Dominic Lewis composed the film score and released through Milan Records on May 30, 2025.

== Background and release ==
Dominic Lewis composed the film score, who incorporated Bill Conti's original themes from The Karate Kid (1984). He also performed few original songs for the film. The score was orchestrated by Tommy Laurence, Stephen Coleman, Geoff Lawson and conducted by Vincent Oppido. The score was released through Milan Records on May 30, 2025.

== Reception ==
Filmtracks gave a negative review, "It's an absolute mess of a soundtrack on the whole, and it has passages that are so mind-bogglingly awful that you can only laugh at their misplacement in this concept." Owen Gleiberman of Variety and Frank Scheck of The Hollywood Reporter called it "amazing" and "memorable".

== Track listing ==
All music is composed by Dominic Lewis, except where noted.

Karate Kid: Legends (Original Motion Picture Soundtrack)
No.	Title	Composer(s)	Length
1.	"Two Branches, One Tree"	Lewis; Bill Conti	2:39
2.	"Mother Knows Best"		2:01
3.	"Tick Tick" (Performed by Lewis)		0:45
4.	"Please" (Performed by Lewis)		1:46
5.	"Li and Mia"		1:16
6.	"The Best of Me"		0:46
7.	"Connor"		0:56
8.	"Black Eye, Frozen Peas"		0:54
9.	"Dragon Kick"		1:07
10.	"Alone"		0:53
11.	"Fong Song"		1:40
12.	"Lanterns"		2:13
13.	"Pizza Montage"		2:44
14.	"Bo"		1:29
15.	"The Arena"		0:31
16.	"Fight Night"		1:01
17.	"Down and"		1:12
18.	"Push Down" (Performed by Lewis)		1:33
19.	"Too Many Cooks"		0:34
20.	"Bedroom Blues"		1:20
21.	"Daniel-San"	Lewis; Conti	2:34
22.	"Training Montage"	Lewis; Conti	4:23
23.	"Fetterman Gardens"		1:18
24.	"5 Boroughs"		2:00
25.	"Old Dogs, New Kicks"		1:31
26.	"Trap a Tiger"	Lewis; Thomas Skyrme	2:04
27.	"Timebomb" (Performed by Lewis)		2:18
28.	"The Final, Part 1"	Lewis; Conti	4:36
29.	"The Final, Part 2"	Lewis; Conti	4:09
30.	"Touch the Stars" (Performed by Lewis)	Lewis; Conti	1:36
Total length:			53:29

== Additional music ==
Commercial songs which were featured in the film, but not included in the soundtrack:

- "Home" – Good Neighbours
- "Trust" – Generationals
- "North American Scum" – LCD Soundsystem
- "Walkin' Out That Door" – Anthony Lukens
- "As We Enter" – Damian Marley and Nas
- "Roadgame" – Kavinsky
- "Run It Up" – Bas
- "Hooligang" – Joey Valence & Brae
- "Don't Sweat The Technique" – Eric B. & Rakim
- "I walk this earth all by myself" – Ekkstacy
- "Mystical Magical" – Benson Boone
- "I Want It That Way" – Backstreet Boys
- "First Blood" – Kavinsky
- "Da Ya Think I'm Sexy?" – Rod Stewart
- "Someone to You" – Banners

== Personnel ==
Credits adapted from Film Music Reporter:

- Music composer and producer: Dominic Lewis
- Music supervisor: George Drakoulias
- Music editor: David Metzner
- Orchestrator: Tommy Laurence, Stephen Coleman, Geoff Lawson
- Conductor: Vincent Oppido
- Score Recording: David Boucher
- Score Mixing: Al Clay
- Digital score recordist: Chandler Harrod
- Synth programming: Tom Skyrme
- Score technical engineer: Jared Andrukat
- Music preparation: Brandon Bailo, Lisa Bennett, Joshua Britt, Leslie Buttars, Nicholas Cazares, April Didomenico, Dave Giuli, Jennifer Hammond, David Horne, Valarie King, Martin McClellan, Aaron Meyer, Melissa Orquiza, Susie Seiter, Karen Smith
- Supervising copyist: Booker White
- Stage librarian: Chris Anderson-Bazzoli
