= Fifty Shades Darker (score) =

Fifty Shades Darker (Original Motion Picture Score)

Film score by Danny Elfman
- Released: February 17, 2017
- Studios: Sony Scoring Stage, Sony Pictures Studios, Culver City; Studio Della Morte, Los Angeles; Sound Waves, Santa Barbara; Bernie Grundman Mastering, Hollywood
- Genre: Film score
- Length: 42:06
- Label: Back Lot Music
- Producers: Danny Elfman; Dana Sano

Danny Elfman chronology
The Girl on the Train (2016)	Fifty Shades Darker (2017)	The Circle (2017)

Fifty Shades Darker (Original Motion Picture Score) is the film score to the 2017 film Fifty Shades Darker directed by James Foley, starring Dakota Johnson and Jamie Dornan. The sequel to Fifty Shades of Grey (2015), it is based on E. L. James's 2012 novel of the same name and serves as the second installment in the Fifty Shades film series. Danny Elfman returned to score the sequel, after doing the same for the predecessors. The score soundtrack was released through Back Lot Music on February 17, 2017.

== Reception ==
A review from The Hollywood Reporter called it "poignant", while WTOP-FM's described it not memorable as like the predecessor. Tim Grierson of Screen International called it "awkwardly melodramatic". Mia Pidlaoan of Screen Rant while reviewing Elfman's best works listed the trilogy, including Darker; she called it as an "inquisitive" score and "gives the movies more depth than what meets the eye."

== Track listing ==
No.	Title	Length
1.	"Nightmare"	2:04
2.	"Christian"	1:37
3.	"On His Knees"	3:24
4.	"Panties"	0:44
5.	"Bathroom Encounter"	2:35
6.	"No Strings Attached"	1:54
7.	"Dossiers"	3:46
8.	"1st Sex"	0:56
9.	"Vandalize"	1:32
10.	"The L Word"	1:52
11.	"Texting"	1:03
12.	"Red Room"	2:33
13.	"A Key"	1:18
14.	"Jack Attack"	1:58
15.	"Danger Girl"	3:32
16.	"Chopper Crash"	0:50
17.	"Survive"	2:49
18.	"Yes!"	1:27
19.	"Announcement"	1:45
20.	"Martini Face"	1:55
21.	"Making It Real"	2:32
Total length:		42:06

== Personnel ==
Credits adapted from liner notes:

- Music composer and producer – Danny Elfman
- Additional music – David Buckley
- Soundtrack producer – Dana Sano
- Technical engineer – Mikel Hurwitz
- Assistant engineer – Ryan Hopkins
- Recording – Dennis Sands, Noah Snyder
- Digital score recordist – Larry Mah
- Mixing – Dennis Sands
- Mixing assistance – Drew Webster
- Digital mix recordist – Adam Olmstead
- Mastering – Patricia Sullivan
- Score editor – Bill Abbott
- Assistant score editor – Denise Okimoto
- MIDI supervision – Marc Mann
- MIDI preparation – Marc Mann, Shie Rozow
- Music coordinator – Melisa McGregor
- Musical assistance – Melissa Karaban
- Copyist – Mark Graham
- Design – Brian Porizek

Orchestra

- Orchestration – Dave Slonaker, Edgardo Simone, Steve Bartek
- Conductor – Pete Anthony
- Orchestra contractor – Gina Zimmitti
- Concertmaster – Bruce Dukov
- Stage crew – Adam Michalak, David Marquette, Greg Dennen, Greg Loskorn

Musicians

- Bass – Chris Kollgaard, David Parmeter, Drew Dembowski, Ian Walker, Nico Philippon, Oscar Hidalgo, Mike Valerio
- Bassoon – Ken Munday, Rose Corrigan
- Cello – Armen Ksajikian, Cecilia Tsan, Charles Tyler, Dennis Karmazyn, Eric Byers, Erika Duke, Giovanna Clayton, Ross Gasworth, Tim Landauer, Tim Loo, Trevor Handy, Vanessa Freebairn-Smith, Steve Erdody
- Clarinet – Ralph Williams, Stuart Clark
- Electric bass – Chris Chaney
- Electric and acoustic guitar – George Doering
- Flute – Heather Clark, Jenni Olson
- Harp – Katie Kirkpatrick
- Oboe – Leslie Reed
- Piano – TJ Lindgren
- Viola – Andrew Duckles, Carolyn Riley, Darrin McCann, David Walther, Erik Rynearson, Keith Greene, Marlow Fisher, Matt Funes, Rob Brophy, Thomas Diener, Shawn Mann
- Violin – Alyssa Park, Ana Landauer, Ben Powell, Carol Pool, Darius Campo, Erik Arvinder, Eun Mee Ahn, Grace Oh, Irina Voloshina, Jackie Brand, Josefina Vergara, Julie Gigante, Julie Rogers, Katia Popov, Lucia Micarelli, Maia Jasper, Natalie Leggett, Neel Hammond, Nina Evtuhov, Roger Wilkie, Sara Parkins, Sarah Thornblade, Serena McKinney, Shalini Vijayan, Songa Lee, Tammy Hatwan, Tereza Stanislav, Yelena Yegoryan, Richard Altenbach
- Vocals – Petra Haden

Management

- Music business and legal affairs For Universal Pictures – Kyle Staggs, Tanya Perara
- Executive in charge of music For Universal Pictures – Mike Knobloch
- Marketing manager for Back Lot Music – Nikki Walsh
- Production director for Back Lot Music – Jake Voulgarides
- Music supervision for Universal Pictures – Rachel Levy

== Chart performance ==
Chart (2017)	Peak position
UK Soundtrack Albums (OCC)	23
US Top Soundtracks (Billboard)	22
