= Alice Through the Looking Glass (soundtrack) =

Alice Through the Looking Glass (Original Motion Picture Soundtrack)

Film score by Danny Elfman
- Released: May 27, 2016
- Recorded: 2016
- Studios: Abbey Road Studios, London; Sound Waves, Santa Barbara
- Genre: Film score
- Length: 76:53
- Label: Walt Disney
- Producer: Danny Elfman

Danny Elfman chronology
Goosebumps (2015)	Alice Through the Looking Glass (2016)	The Girl on the Train (2016)

Alice Through the Looking Glass (Original Motion Picture Soundtrack) is the film score to the 2016 film Alice Through the Looking Glass directed by James Bobin. It is the sequel/prequel to the Alice in Wonderland (2010), with Johnny Depp, Anne Hathaway, Mia Wasikowska, Helena Bonham Carter amongst others reprise the roles for the film, alongside Rhys Ifans and Sacha Baron Cohen.

== Background ==
In August 2014, it was announced that Danny Elfman, who previously scored for Alice in Wonderland would return for the sequel. Elfman prioritized working on the score, which resulted in him not working with his frequent collaborator Tim Burton on Miss Peregrine's Home for Peculiar Children (2016) due to scheduling conflicts.

== Release ==
Pink recorded the original song "Just Like Fire" which was released on April 15, 2016. The soundtrack was released through Walt Disney Records on May 27, 2016.

== Track listing ==
No.	Title	Length
1.	"Alice"	6:35
2.	"Saving the Ship"	3:40
3.	"Watching Time"	5:10
4.	"Looking Glass"	3:30
5.	"To the Rescue"	0:56
6.	"Hatter House"	3:47
7.	"The Red Queen"	2:29
8.	"The Chronosphere"	4:15
9.	"Warning Hightopps"	2:23
10.	"Tea Time Forever"	1:45
11.	"Oceans of Time"	1:15
12.	"Hat Heartbreak"	2:27
13.	"Asylum Escape"	4:06
14.	"Hatter's Deathbed"	3:22
15.	"Finding the Family"	2:04
16.	"Time Is Up"	4:24
17.	"World's End"	1:50
18.	"Truth"	4:09
19.	"Goodbye Alice"	2:13
20.	"Kingsleigh & Kingsleigh"	1:19
21.	"Seconds Song"	0:11
22.	"Friends United"	1:06
23.	"Time's Castle"	1:49
24.	"The Seconds"	1:55
25.	"Clock Shop"	0:50
26.	"They're Alive"	2:23
27.	"Story of Time"	3:03
28.	"Just Like Fire" (performed by Pink)	3:35
Total length:		76:53

== Reception ==
Filmtracks wrote: "Ultimately, the stunning quality of the new "Alice" suite, the rousing action cues, "Saving the Ship" and "Time is Up," and the general, underlying strength of the referenced material all point to a five-star rating. It's rare that you receive such a competent sequel to an original classic." Stephen Holden of The New York Times wrote: "Danny Elfman's score settles into a mood of overawed grandiosity". Matt Zoller-Seitz of RogerEbert.com wrote: "Danny Elfman's score ladles Magic and Wonder over every scene, to convince you that what's onscreen doesn't look like a Shrek film as painted by an amateur who idolizes Leroy Neiman." Rashid Irani of Hindustan Times wrote: "Burton's regular collaborator Danny Elfman provides a wondrous background score."

== Personnel ==
Credits adapted from liner notes:

- Music composer and producer – Danny Elfman
- Additional music – Chris Bacon, TJ Lindgren
- Music programming – Peter Bateman
- Midi supervision and preparation – Marc Mann
- Recording – Peter Gobbin
- Recording assistance – Matt Jones, Stefano Civetta
- Digital recordist – Noah Snyder, Toby Hulbert
- Mixing – Dennis S. Sands
- Mixing assistance – Adam Olmstead
- Mastering – Patricia Sullivan
- Score editor – Kirsty Whalley
- Assistant score editor – Denise Okimoto
- Music editors – Bill Abbott, Lisa Jaime
- Musical assistance – Melissa Karaban
- Technical assistance – Greg Maloney
- Executive producer – James Bobin, Jennifer Todd, Joe Roth, Suzanne Todd, Tim Burton
- Score production coordinator – Melisa McGregor
- Music preparation – Dakota Music Service
- Copyist – Dave Hage
- Package design – Steve Sterling

Orchestra

- Supervising orchestrator – Steve Bartek
- Orchestrators – Dave Slonaker, Edgardo Simone
- Assistant orchestrator – Darren McKenzie
- Orchestra conductor – Rick Wentworth
- Orchestra contractor – Isobel Griffiths
- Assistant orchestra contractor – Jo Changer
- Orchestra leader – Everton Nelson

Choir

- Choir – Metro Voices
- Children's choir – Cardinal Vaughan School
- Choir conductor – Rick Wentworth
- Choirmaster – Jenny O'Grady
- Children's choirmaster – Scott Price
- Solo vocals – Alessandro MacKinnon

Management

- Music business and legal affairs for Walt Disney Studios Motion Picture Production – Don Welty, Marc Shaw, Scott Holtzman
- Creative director for music for Walt Disney Studios Motion Pictures Production – Kaylin Frank
- Executive in charge of music and soundtracks for Walt Disney Studios Motion Pictures Production and the Disney Music Group – Mitchell Leib
- Product manager for Walt Disney Studios Motion Picture Production – Ryan Hopman

== Accolades ==
Accolades received by Alice Through the Looking Glass (2016 film)
Award	Category	Recipient(s)		Ref.
Grammy Awards	Best Song Written For Visual Media	"Just Like Fire" – Oscar Holter, Max Martin, Pink and Shellback	Nominated	
Hollywood Music in Media Awards	Best Song – Sci-Fi/Fantasy Film	"Just Like Fire" – Oscar Holter, Max Martin, Pink and Shellback	Won	
Teen Choice Awards	Choice Music: Song from a Movie or TV Show	"Just Like Fire" by Pink	Nominated	
