= The Girl on the Train (2016 soundtrack) =

The Girl on the Train (Original Motion Picture Soundtrack)

Film score by Danny Elfman
- Released: October 7, 2016 (digital); October 21, 2016 (physical)
- Recorded: 2016
- Studio: The DiMenna Center for Classical Music, New York City
- Genre: Film score
- Length: 51:57
- Label: Sony Classical
- Producer: Danny Elfman

Danny Elfman chronology
Alice Through the Looking Glass (2016)	The Girl on the Train (2016)	Fifty Shades Darker (2017)

The Girl on the Train (Original Motion Picture Soundtrack) is the film score to the 2016 film The Girl on the Train directed by Tate Taylor, starring Emily Blunt, Rebecca Ferguson, Haley Bennett, Justin Theroux, Luke Evans, Allison Janney, Édgar Ramírez, and Lisa Kudrow. The film score is composed by Danny Elfman and was released under the Sony Classical Records label digitally on October 7, 2016, followed by a physical release on October 21, 2016.

== Development ==
Danny Elfman composed the film score for The Girl on the Train. He accepted the film, as he was appealed to thriller films, but "as much as that, it was meeting a director [Taylor] who I had a feeling would give me a long leash." He went ahead with an unorthodox approach to the score, by playing bass-heavy, rhythmic motor using de-tuned mandolins and high-pitched electric guitars. At certain sequences, musical phrases are run in reverse to create disorientation. Elfman created most of the score using synthesizers and sampled instruments, programming his sounds late at night.

== Reception ==
Marcy Donelson of AllMusic wrote "Consistently atmospheric as well as uncanny, The Girl on the Train is a compelling diversion for Elfman, who makes more of it than a mere genre exercise." Filmtracks wrote "The Girl on the Train is an admirable but largely unlistenable experience. There are moments in "Something's Not Right" and "Really Creepy" that are high-volume, screeching noise, downright repulsive in every way possible. But the combined ten minutes of more lucid material at the start and end, punctuated by the comparatively pretty "Resolution" and "Main Titles," along with portions of the intellectually intriguing deconstruction in between, keep this score barely manageable for the Elfman enthusiast."

Todd McCarthy of The Hollywood Reporter called it "a quite extraordinary musical score by Danny Elfman, working in an entirely uncharacteristic mode" Peter Travers of Rolling Stone and Mark Kermode of The Guardian called it to be "haunting" and "expressive". Brian Lowry of CNN considered Elfman's score to be "tension-building assets" and one of the film's highlights. Kristy Puchko of Comic Book Resources called it an "ominous score".

Geoffrey Macnab of The Independent wrote "Danny Elfman's swirling music accentuates the dream-like feel". Chloe Catchpole of Den of Geek wrote "Danny Elfman's adventurous score is a soaring highlight using synthetic sonic currents that instantly become the tonal heartbeat through the film's duration, which is worlds away from his characteristic Burton-esque melodies."

== Track listing ==
No.	Title	Length
1.	"Riding the Train"	4:05
2.	"Something's Not Right"	2:31
3.	"Megan"	1:45
4.	"Rachel"	2:32
5.	"Stolen?"	0:46
6.	"3 Women"	1:35
7.	"All F*cked Up!"	2:28
8.	"Wasted"	2:11
9.	"Missing Time"	2:04
10.	"Day One"	0:47
11.	"Deviled Eggs"	0:57
12.	"Touch Myself"	1:37
13.	"Uncertainty"	0:57
14.	"The Perfect Couple / Password"	2:46
15.	"I'm Sorry"	5:03
16.	"A Sad Liar"	1:38
17.	"You're Always Wasted"	2:10
18.	"Memory"	6:20
19.	"Really Creepy"	4:03
20.	"Just Desserts / Self Defense"	3:19
21.	"Resolution / The Girl On The Train" (Main Titles)	2:23
Total length:		51:57

== Reception ==
Credits adapted from liner notes:

- Music composer and producer – Danny Elfman
- Recording – Lawrence Manchester, Noah Scot Snyder
- Mixing – Noah Scot Snyder, Ryan Hopkins
- Mastering – Patricia Sullivan
- Music editor – Bill Abbott, Nic Ratner
- Score editor – David Channing
- Musical assistance – Melissa Karaban
- Technical assistance – Mikel Hurwitz
- Music coordinator – Gina Zimmitti
- Production coordinator – Melisa McGregor
- Licensing – Mark Cavell
- Product development – Klara Korytowska

Orchestra

- Orchestration – David Slonaker, Edgardo Simone, Steve Bartek
- Conductor – Pete Anthony
- Orchestra contractor – Sandra Park, Gina Zimmitti
- Studio manager – Joe D'Ambrosio

Instruments

- Bass – Blake Hinson, Bradley Aikman, Ian Walker, Jacqui Danilow, Jeremy McCoy, Marji Danilow, Pawel Knapik, Rachel Calin
- Cello – Alan Stepansky, Andrew Janss, Caitlin Sullivan, David Heiss, Jules King, Mary Wooten, Maureen McDermott, Mina Smith, Sarah Seiver
- Harp – Grace Paradise
- MIDI – Marc Mann, Steve Bateman
- Piano – T. J. Lindgren
- Synthesizer – Danny Elfman, Michael Tuller
- Viola – Adrienne Somerville, Alexis Sykes, Calvin Wiersma, Celia Hatton, Junah Chung, Mary Hammann, Nikki Federman, Robert Rinehart, Shmuel Katz, Vivek Kamath, Will Frampton
- Violin – Angela Lee, Ann Lehmann, Anna Rabinova, Annaliesa Place, Cathy Sim, Cenovia Cummins, David Southorn, Liz Lim, Emily Popham, Emma Sutton, Fiona Simon, Henry Wang, Jeanine Wynton, Joanna Maurer, Karen Marx, Katherine Fong, Krzysztof Kuznik, Lisa Kim, Lisa Lee, Matt Lehmann, Miran Kim, Peter Bahng, Ragga Petursdottir, Sein Ryu, Shan Jiang, Sophia Kessinger, Suzanne Ornstein, Tallie Brunfelt
- Vocals – Petra Haden, Melisa McGregor
