= Kingsman: The Golden Circle (soundtrack) =

Kingsman: The Golden Circle (Original Motion Picture Score)

Soundtrack album by Henry Jackman and Matthew Margeson
- Released: 22 September 2017
- Recorded: 2017
- Studio: AIR Lyndhurst Studios
- Genre: Film score
- Length: 76:00
- Label: La-La Land Records; Fox Music

Kingsman chronology
Kingsman: The Secret Service (2015)	Kingsman: The Golden Circle (2017)	The King's Man (2021)

Henry Jackman chronology
Kong: Skull Island (2017)	Kingsman: The Golden Circle (2017)	Jumanji: Welcome to the Jungle (2017)

Matthew Margeson chronology
Rings (2017)	Kingsman: The Golden Circle (2017)	Truth or Dare (2018)

Kingsman: The Golden Circle is the soundtrack to the 2017 film of the same name, composed by Henry Jackman and Matthew Margeson. The score was recorded at AIR Lyndhurst Studios in London with additional mixing at Westside Pacific Studios. The score was conducted by Gavin Greenaway with Matt Dunkley as an additional conductor. It was released on iTunes on 22 September 2017 and on CD on 27 October 2017 by La-La Land Records and Fox Music.

== Track listing ==
All music is composed by Henry Jackman and Matthew Margeson.

No.	Title	Length
1.	"Eggsy Is Back"	5:50
2.	"Memories of Harry"	2:00
3.	"The Golden Circle"	1:18
4.	"Poppy"	2:17
5.	"Incoming Missiles"	2:56
6.	"You May Shed a Tear in Private"	3:02
7.	"Tequila"	2:09
8.	"The Lepidopterist"	2:16
9.	"Rescuing Harry"	1:45
10.	"Statesman"	1:48
11.	"Ginger's First Test"	1:15
12.	"Whiskey's Demons"	1:02
13.	"Tornado in a Trailer Park"	2:30
14.	"Poppy's Terms"	3:01
15.	"Dancing Disease"	3:05
16.	"The Gondola Experience"	6:30
17.	"Cabin Ambush"	4:13
18.	"Horrific News Report"	2:41
19.	"Flying to Poppyland"	5:09
20.	"No Time for Emotion"	2:51
21.	"Temple Battle"	6:54
22.	"Viva Las Vegan"	2:44
23.	"Not in Vain"	3:59
24.	"A Man Who's Honorable"	2:41
25.	"Kingsman Hoedown"	2:17
Total length:		76:00

Tracks 1, 20, and 23 incorporate "Take Me Home, Country Roads" (B. Danoff/T. Nivert/J. Denver).
Track 20 is sung by Mark Strong.

Songs not included in the soundtrack, but featured in the film include the following:

- Prince and The Revolution - "Let's Go Crazy"
- Harold Melvin & the Blue Notes - "Don't Leave Me This Way"
- Buddy Holly - "Raining in My Heart"
- Embrace - "Ashes"
- Tom Chaplin - "Quicksand"
- John Denver - "Annie's Song"
- Henry Jackman - "Rage and Serenity" (from X-Men: First Class)
- Elton John - "Daniel"
- Elton John - "Saturday Night's Alright for Fighting"
- Elton John - "Rocket Man (I Think It's Going to Be a Long, Long Time)"
- The BossHoss - "Word Up!"
- Cameo - "Word Up!"
- Elton John - "Jack Rabbit"
