= Gran Turismo (soundtrack) =

Gran Turismo (Original Motion Picture Soundtrack)

Film score by Lorne Balfe and Andrew Kawczynski
- Released: August 11, 2023
- Recorded: 2023
- Studio: Synchron Stage Vienna
- Genre: Film score
- Length: 72:52
- Label: Sony Classical
- Producer: Lorne Balfe

Lorne Balfe chronology
Mission: Impossible – Dead Reckoning Part One (2023)	Gran Turismo (2023)	Argylle (2024)

Andrew Kawczynski chronology
Ping Pong: The Triumph (2023)	Gran Turismo (2023)

Gran Turismo (Original Motion Picture Soundtrack) is the soundtrack to the 2023 film Gran Turismo. Jointly composed by Lorne Balfe and Andrew Kawczynski, the soundtrack consisting of 17 instrumental tracks from the score, was released by Sony Classical Records on August 11, 2023 in digital formats, with a physical release on August 25.

== Development ==
In September 2022, Stephen Barton was initially recruited as the score composer. But in April 2023, Lorne Balfe took over the scoring duties from Barton with Andrew Kawczynski, one of Hans Zimmer's protégé who worked in his Remote Control Productions later joined as co-composer. The score was recorded at the Synchron Stage Vienna with over 100 musicians.

== Track listing ==
No.	Title	Length
1.	"And We're Off"	4:40
2.	"Chance to Compete"	4:38
3.	"Jann's Journey"	2:47
4.	"You've Been Selected"	5:17
5.	"This Is Not a Game"	3:37
6.	"I Will Be Your Judge"	4:22
7.	"Brakes Were Glazed"	4:15
8.	"Academy Race"	5:15
9.	"Rhythms of the Road"	6:34
10.	"Full Throttle"	2:45
11.	"Breaking Info Form"	4:46
12.	"Worst Fears"	4:03
13.	"Lost in Depths"	3:21
14.	"Proving Grounds"	2:54
15.	"Riding the Edge"	4:48
16.	"Follow Your Line"	2:57
17.	"The Drive Within"	5:53
Total length:		72:52

== Reception ==
Mark Kermode of The Guardian called the score as "thunderously declarative" which "ensures that no manipulative beat is missed". Sonya Alexander of Script wrote "Lorne Balfe and Andrew Kawczynski’s score creates an undercurrent of stealth sonic waves, driving the emotional beats of the film." Justin Lowe of The Hollywood Reporter complimented the score as "engaging", Owen Gilberman of Variety called it as"uplifting". Edward Douglas of Below the Line wrote "Much of the excitement and emotion is driven by the score composed by Lorne Balfe and Andrew Kawczynski, although Blomkamp also uses a wide range of song choices in the storytelling from Black Sabbath (representing Salter) to the Kenny G and Enya that Jann prefers to help him get into the right headspace for getting behind the wheel." Christopher Connor of Movie Marker wrote "Lorne Balfe’s score keeps the sequences on track."

== Credits ==
Credits adapted from Film Music Reporter:

- Music composer: Lorne Balfe, Andrew Kawczynski
- Music producer: Lorne Balfe
- Music editor: David Metzner
- Orchestrated by: Bernard Duc
- Conducted by: Gottfried Rabl
- Score mixxer: Bernd Mazagg
- Music production services: Steven Kofsky
- Music production lead: Taylor Eblen
- Additional arrangements: Michael Bitton, Michael Frankenberger, Taran Mitchell, Rufio Sandilands, Alfie Godfrey, Kiley Norton
- Additional sound design: Austin Wintory, Jason Graves, Joris de Man, Lena Raine, Helen Lynch, The Flight
- Scoring engineer: Tristan Linton
- Digital score recordist: Lukas Lützow
- Music contractor: Marton Barka
- Music preparation by: Sugi Shin

== Additional music ==
The following songs were featured in the film, but are not in the soundtrack. They are all included in the Gran Turismo Official Playlist, on Spotify.

1. "Hold My Head" by Kenny Beats
2. "Paranoid" by Black Sabbath
3. "Waltz in A flat major, Op. 69, no. 1 (Farewell)" by Classical Coterie
4. "Peak" by Jubilee
5. "Afterthought" by Joji feat. BENEE
6. "Vroom" by The FaNaTiX feat. Idris Elba, Lil Tjay, Davido, Koffee & Moelogo
7. "Get Out My Way" by Tedashii feat. Lecrae
8. "KILL DEM" by Jamie xx
9. "Coming In Hot" by Andy Mineo feat. Lecrae
10. "Revolt" by Boys Noize
11. "Songbird" by Kenny G
12. "Because I'm Me" by The Avalanches
13. "Make My Move" by Oliver Michael feat. King Marino
14. "Paper Mache" by Dan Kanvis
15. "Orinoco Flow" by Enya
16. "Search & Destroy" by Iggy Pop and the Stooges
17. "War Pigs" by Black Sabbath
18. "Celebrate" by Courtney Bell
19. "Big Jet Plane" by Restricted
20. "Pepas (Tiësto Remix)" by Farruko & Tiësto
21. "Wash." by Bon Iver
22. "La Marseillaise" by Claude Joseph Rouget de Lisle
23. "Harder Than You Think" by Public Enemy
24. "God Moving Over The Face Of The Waters" by Moby
25. "Wilderness" by Explosions In The Sky
26. "Hate Me Now" by Nas feat. Diddy

Additionally, the Japanese dub includes one additional song exclusive to it, "Climax" by T-Square.
