= Jumanji: Welcome to the Jungle (soundtrack) =

Jumanji: Welcome to the Jungle (Original Motion Picture Soundtrack)

Film score by Henry Jackman
- Released: December 15, 2017 (Digital/CD); May 5, 2018 (Vinyl)
- Recorded: 2017
- Genre: Film score
- Length: 60:00
- Label: Sony Masterworks

Jumanji chronology
Zathura: A Space Adventure (Original Motion Picture Soundtrack) (2005)	Jumanji: Welcome to the Jungle (Original Motion Picture Soundtrack) (2017)	Jumanji: The Next Level (2019)

Henry Jackman chronology
Kingsman: The Golden Circle (2017)	Jumanji: Welcome to the Jungle (Original Motion Picture Soundtrack) (2017)	Trial by Fire (2018)

Professional ratings
Review scores
Source	Rating
Soundtrack Geek	4.5/5 stars
Movie Wave	3.5/5 stars
Discogs	4.5/5 stars

Jumanji: Welcome to the Jungle (Original Motion Picture Soundtrack) is the film score to the 2017 film of the same name, written, and composed by British composer Henry Jackman. The soundtrack was released digitally on December 15, 2017 through Sony Masterworks. A limited edition Vinyl which consisted of 300 copies was released on May 5, 2018. The score was nominated for the 2018 IFMCA Award for Best Original Score for an Action/Adventure/Thriller Film.

== Background ==
James Newton Howard was originally attached to the film as composer. However, Henry Jackman took over scoring duties after the film's post-production schedule was pushed back 6 months which made Newton Howard unavailable.

The score was recorded at the Barbra Streisand Scoring Stage and conducted by Nick Glennie-Smith and Stephen Coleman. Halli Cauthery and Paul Mounsey provided additional music.

== Track listing ==
All music is composed by Henry Jackman

No.	Title	Length
1.	"The Jumanji Overture"	3:20
2.	"Digging Up the Past"	1:43
3.	"Brantford High"	1:09
4.	"Into the Jungle"	1:23
5.	"Out of Character"	2:31
6.	"The Legend of the Jewel"	2:23
7.	"The Adventure Begins"	1:40
8.	"Special Abilities"	1:16
9.	"The Bikers"	3:44
10.	"Van Pelt"	1:00
11.	"A Test of Friendship"	1:22
12.	"The Bazaar"	1:16
13.	"Snake Charmer"	3:41
14.	"The Power of Bravestone"	1:04
15.	"Seaplane McDonough"	2:17
16.	"The Missing Piece"	1:46
17.	"Lost in Time"	1:18
18.	"Flirting with Danger"	1:36
19.	"Albino Rhinos"	3:44
20.	"Retrieving the Emerald"	1:54
21.	"Out of Lives"	1:49
22.	"First Kiss"	1:22
23.	"The Jaguars"	3:03
24.	"Ring of Fire"	2:07
25.	"Begin the Climb"	1:56
26.	"Call Out Its Name"	2:23
27.	"Leaving Jumanji"	3:03
28.	"An Older Friend"	2:40
29.	"Back to School"	1:53
Total length:		60:00

Songs not included in the soundtrack, but featured in the film include the following:

- "Rollercoaster" by Bleachers
- "Break Out" by Jordyn Kane
- "Baby, I Love Your Way" by Big Mountain - Plays when Ruby Roundhouse does her dance fighting
- "Welcome to the Jungle" by Guns N' Roses - Plays in the end credits.
