= Jimmy Hayward =

Canadian animator and film director

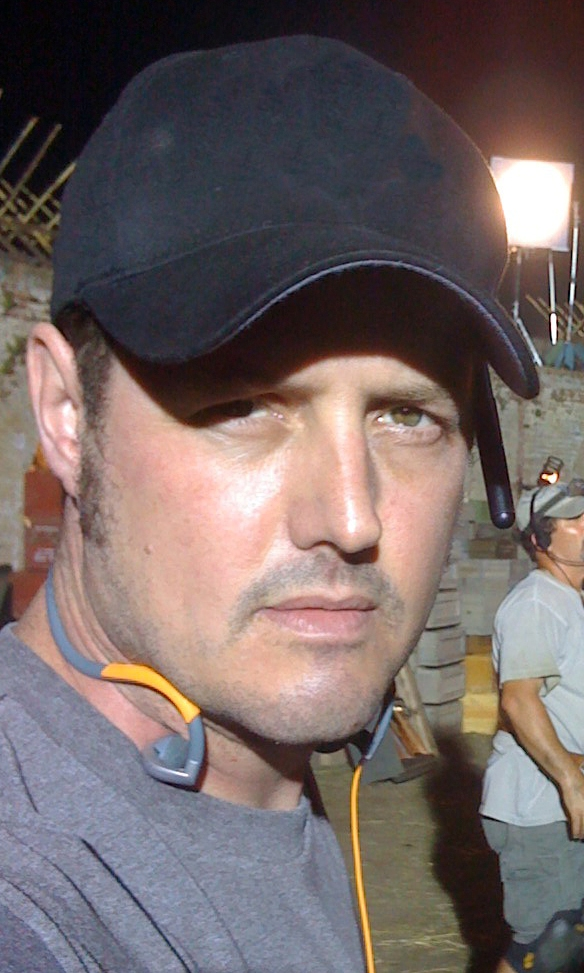
- Hayward in 2009
- Born: September 17, 1970 (age 55); Kingston, Ontario, Canada
- Occupations: Director, screenwriter, animator
- Notable work: Horton Hears a Who; Jonah Hex

James Hayward (born September 17, 1970) is a Canadian film director, screenwriter and animator. He has written screenplays for Columbia, 20th Century Fox, and Warner Brothers.

== Biography ==
At a young age, Hayward began his career at Mainframe Entertainment animating and directing commercials. He was one of the original animators of the television series ReBoot in which he was the first animator to be hired and invited while the studio’s employees working on the series in Granville Island Hotel. He modeled the character Phong in the show. Throughout his career, he has worked at Pixar Animation Studios, 20th Century Fox and Blue Sky Studios, and was an animator for Toy Story, A Bug's Life, Toy Story 2, Monsters, Inc. and Finding Nemo. He was the sequence director and story consultant for Robots.

His studio directorial debut, Dr. Seuss' Horton Hears a Who! starring Jim Carrey and Steve Carell, had a worldwide gross of $298.6 million.

Hayward's first live-action film, Jonah Hex, was released in June 2010. While it was a commercial failure, having grossed only $11 million against a budget of $47 million and received generally negative reviews from critics, it did succeed on several streaming platforms for years.

Hayward was also director and writer on an animated film Free Birds, starring Woody Harrelson, Owen Wilson and Amy Poehler, which was released in 2013. The film was a financial success, grossing over $110 million.

In April 2023, a benefit for Hayward was put together to help pay medical bills in relation to a bone cancer diagnosis.

While in cancer treatment, Hayward directed projects with world renowned bands like Primus and Tool. After surviving multiple surgeries and radiation, Hayward was declared cancer free.

== Filmography ==
=== Animator ===
Year	Title	Notes
1994	ReBoot	Senior animator: episodes 1–4
1995	Toy Story	
1996	Disney's Animated Storybook: Toy Story	Video game
1996	Toy Story Activity Center	Video game
1998	A Bug's Life	Additional animator
1999	Toy Story 2	
2001	Monsters, Inc.	
2002	Mike's New Car	Short film
2003	Finding Nemo	

=== Voice roles ===
Year	Title	Role	Notes
2008	Dr. Seuss' Horton Hears a Who!	Obnoxious Who	
2013	Free Birds	Ranger/Leatherbeak/President/Hazmats	Additional voices
2015	Transformers vs. G.I. Joe: The Commissary	Narrator/Destro/Soundwave/Gung-Ho/Zartan	3 episodes

=== Director ===
Year	Title	Notes
2008	Dr. Seuss' Horton Hears a Who!	Also musician: guitar
2010	Jonah Hex	Live-action role: Train Wood Tender
2013	Free Birds	Also writer

=== Other credits ===
Year	Title	Role
1995	NHL 96	Special thanks
1999	Toy Story 2	Additional story material
2005	Robots	Director of additional scenes and story consultant
