= Mission: Impossible – Dead Reckoning Part One (soundtrack) =

Mission: Impossible – Dead Reckoning Part One (Music from the Motion Picture)

Film score by Lorne Balfe
- Released: July 12, 2023 (digital); July 26, 2023 (physical)
- Recorded: 2020–2023
- Genre: Film score
- Labels: Sony Music Entertainment; Paramount Music
- Producer: Lorne Balfe

Lorne Balfe chronology
Ghosted (2023)	Mission: Impossible – Dead Reckoning Part One (Music from the Motion Picture) (2023)	Gran Turismo (2023)

Mission: Impossible – Dead Reckoning Part One (Music from the Motion Picture) is the soundtrack to the 2023 film Mission: Impossible – Dead Reckoning Part One, the seventh installment in the Mission: Impossible film series and the sequel to Mission: Impossible – Fallout (2018). Lorne Balfe, who composed the score for the predecessor, returned to provide music for the original planned two-part series of Dead Reckoning. The soundtrack to the film was released digitally on July 12, 2023, alongside the film by Sony Music Entertainment and Paramount Music, with a physical release to be followed on July 26, by La-La Land Records. The album was recorded in various parts of Europe with 500 musicians performing the score. The opening titles of the film were released as a single on July 6.

== Development ==
Lorne Balfe started writing the music for Dead Reckoning in 2020, who recalled that the film's emotion came from "a totally different side to Ethan where he was protective and driven by different things". Like the predecessors, he reused the franchise's opening theme composed by Lalo Schifrin as it was connected well throughout the film and Ethan's musical motif. He went into a darker space for chord progressions looking back to the reinventions of Sergei Rachmaninoff and Igor Stravinsky, which is what "the audience relates to and their connection with it, but it's twisted differently … It was about taking that and delving into the emotional and tragic vocabulary."

The score was recorded in conjunction with the filming itself, which took place in various locations in Europe—Rome, Vienna, Venice, Switzerland and London. Balfe wanted to be "pure and honest" on depicting the authenticity throughout the film, hence he brought several local musicians and ensemble across Europe which helped them discover new talents. McQuarrie and Cruise saw the performance of Top Secret Drum Corps percussion group from Basel, Switzerland performing at the Queen's Jubilee birthday honours and mentioned the same to Balfe. He recalled that in the group they had found the missing piece of the DNA and wanted them to involve in the score where it becomes "rhythmical and percussive".

Balfe recalled there was a lot of experimentation with the score as he had more time working on the film. More than fourteen hours of score had been recorded for the film with over 555 musicians. Due to time constraints, the full score has been edited to two-and-a-half hours long. On July 8, 2023, Balfe shared a snippet from the orchestral recording that performed the main theme, further indicating the creative process behind the film score. On October 27, an extended edition of the soundtrack was released, including 15 previously unreleased tracks. La-La Land Records announced a soundtrack CD featuring the film's "suites and themes" shortly thereafter, featuring the 15 bonus tracks of the extended edition.

== Track listing ==
All music is composed by Lorne Balfe, except where noted.

Mission: Impossible – Dead Reckoning Part One (Music from the Motion Picture)
No.	Title	Length
1.	"The Sevastopol^{[a]}^{[b]}"	2:07
2.	"The Phantom^{[a]}"	3:05
3.	"Collision Alarm^{[a]}"	1:31
4.	"A Ghost in the Machine^{[a]}"	2:38
5.	"The Sum of Our Choices^{[a]}"	1:24
6.	"Dead Reckoning Opening Titles^{[a]}"	1:12
7.	"The Entity^{[a]}"	3:22
8.	"Your Mission..."	2:34
9.	"This Is Not a Drill^{[a]}^{[b]}"	2:13
10.	"The Plot Thickens^{[a]}^{[b]}"	8:21
11.	"You Are Dunn^{[b]}"	5:54
12.	"Get Out Now^{[a]}"	1:56
13.	"A Colourful Past^{[b]}"	3:11
14.	"Rush Hour in Rome^{[a]}^{[b]}"	3:33
15.	"Roman Getaway^{[a]}^{[b]}"	2:46
16.	"You're Driving^{[a]}^{[b]}"	2:04
17.	"Hit It^{[a]}^{[b]}"	2:10
18.	"He Calls Himself Gabriel^{[a]}"	6:22
19.	"A Most Probable Next^{[a]}^{[b]}"	5:20
20.	"Run As Far As You Can"	1:59
21.	"You Are Done"	3:28
22.	"Chasing Grace^{[a]}"	2:51
23.	"I Was Hoping It'd Be You"	1:41
24.	"Ponte Dei Conzafelzi^{[a]}"	2:19
25.	"To Be a Ghost^{[a]}^{[b]}"	2:21
26.	"What Is Your Objective^{[a]}^{[b]}"	4:27
27.	"Murder and the Orient Express^{[a]}"	3:34
28.	"Mask of Lies^{[a]}"	2:37
29.	"I Missed the Train^{[a]}^{[b]}"	3:05
30.	"Key Details^{[b]}"	3:36
31.	"The Moment of Truth^{[b]}"	2:17
32.	"Should You Choose to Accept^{[a]}^{[b]}"	1:59
33.	"Leap of Faith^{[a]}"	1:36
34.	"Consequences"	1:41
35.	"You Stop the Train^{[a]}^{[b]}"	3:48
36.	"Chaos on the Line"	2:48
37.	"Countdown^{[a]}^{[b]}"	2:54
38.	"This Was the Plan^{[a]}^{[b]}"	6:15
39.	"Curtain Call^{[a]}"	1:01
Total length:		1:58:19

Mission: Impossible – Dead Reckoning Part One (Music from the Motion Picture) [Extended Edition]
No.	Title	Artist(s)	Length
40.	"Ethan's Fate"	Lorne Balfe; Kevin Blumenfeld	4:37
41.	"A Life Remembered^{[a]}"		7:48
42.	"Point of No Return^{[a]}"		2:39
43.	"The World Is Changing"		3:36
44.	"The Iron Path"		2:52
45.	"Ink and Keys"		2:43
46.	"The Truth Is Vanishing^{[a]}"	Lorne Balfe; Kevin Blumenfeld; Joshua Pacey	2:30
47.	"Shadows of Sorrow"	Kevin Blumenfeld; Lorne Balfe	2:58
48.	"Passion's Embrace"	Lorne Balfe; Joshua Pacey	3:18
49.	"The Excommunication of Autumn^{[a]}^{[b]}"	Lorne Balfe; Adam Price	1:36
50.	"Mission Conclusive^{[a]}^{[b]}"		8:08
51.	"War Is Coming^{[a]}"		9:04
52.	"Xm09 Barren Wilderness"		4:44
53.	"Xm18 Dunes^{[a]}"		2:16
54.	"Xm22 Hunt"		3:28
Total length:			3:00:36

== Reception ==
To date, the score has been positively reviewed by critics. Alex Flood of NME called the score as "bombastic" and "reinvented to thrilling effect". Time Out's Phil de Semlyen called the score as "beefy", while Tim Grierson of Screen International complimented it as "pulsating". David Rooney of The Hollywood Reporter commented "Much of the propulsion is also due to Lorne Balfe's pounding score, incorporating a thunderous remix of the classic Lalo Schifrin TV theme music." Jamie Graham of GamesRadar+ also wrote "Lorne Balfe newly ignites Lalo Schifrin's original theme tune with a percussive makeover that plays like syncopated detonations". Chris Bumbray of JoBlo.com wrote "The score, by Lorne Balfe, is good as always, nicely complimenting the movie's darker tone by occasionally taking on a more bittersweet, somber tone."

== Notes ==
- ^{^a} Contain interpolations of "Theme from Mission: Impossible" composed by Lalo Schifrin
- ^{^b} Contain interpolations of "The Plot" composed by Lalo Schifrin
