= Granville Island Hotel =

Hotel in Vancouver, BC, Canada

Coordinates: 49.26928°N 123.13096°W

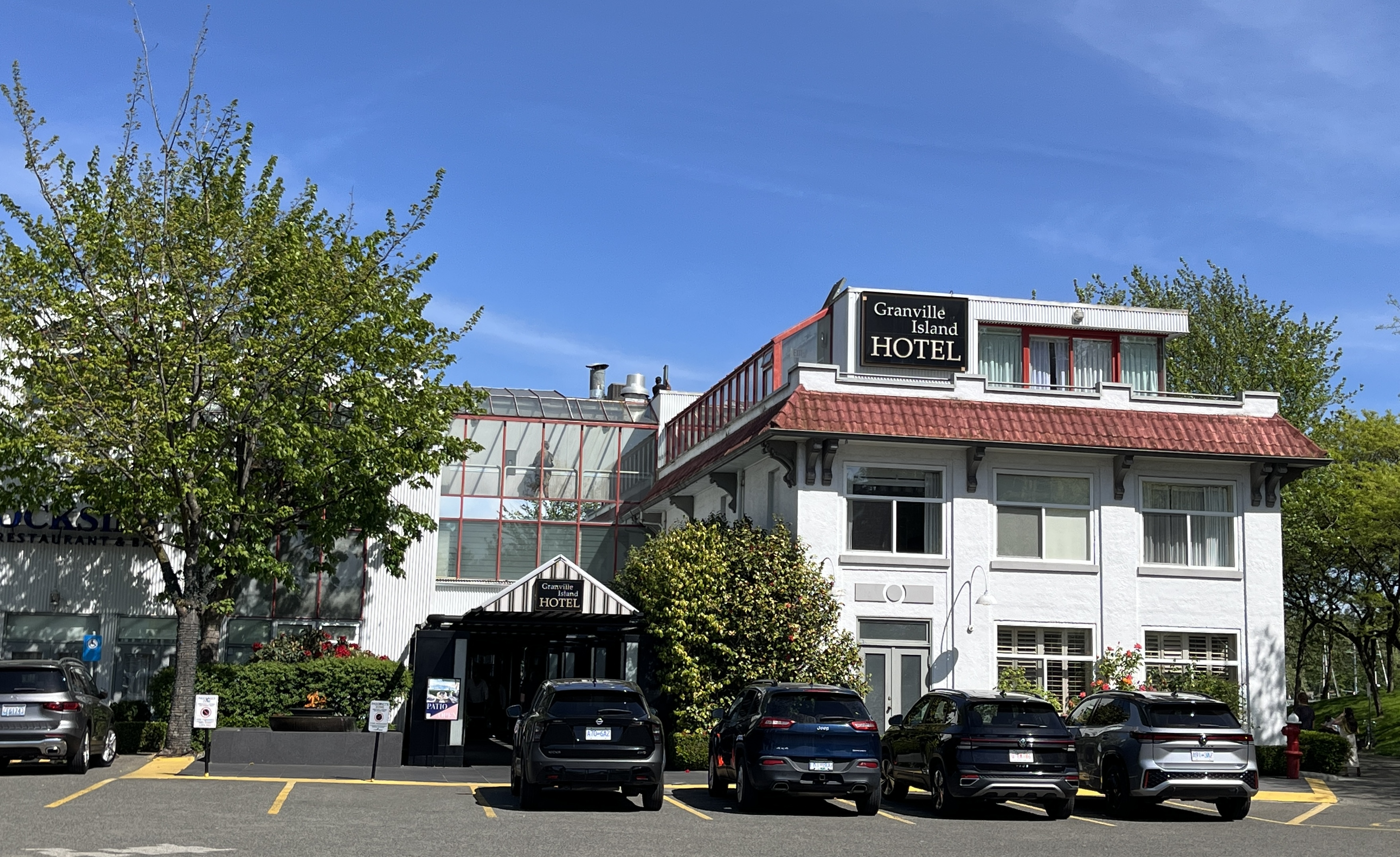
Granville Island Hotel, Granville Island, Vancouver, British Columbia.

Granville Island Hotel is a hotel in Vancouver, British Columbia, Canada. The hotel is located on Granville Island and is cited as "one of Vancouver's best kept secrets".
