= Goosebumps (soundtrack) =

Goosebumps (Original Motion Picture Soundtrack)

Soundtrack album / Film score by Danny Elfman
- Released: October 9, 2015 (digital); October 23, 2015 (physical)
- Recorded: 2015
- Studios: Newman Scoring Stage, 20th Century Fox Studios, Los Angeles; Sony Scoring Stage, Sony Pictures Studios, Culver City; Studio Della Morte, Los Angeles
- Genre: Film score
- Length: 64:07
- Labels: Madison Gate; Sony Classical
- Producer: Danny Elfman

Danny Elfman film scores chronology
Avengers: Age of Ultron (2015)	Goosebumps (2015)	Alice Through the Looking Glass (2016)

Goosebumps (Original Motion Picture Soundtrack) is the soundtrack album to the 2015 film Goosebumps directed by Rob Letterman based on R. L. Stine's children's horror novel series of the same name. The film score is composed by Danny Elfman and released digitally through Madison Gate Records on October 9, 2015, and in CDs through Sony Classical Records on October 23, 2015.

== Background ==
In April 2015, in an interview to Steven Weintraub of Collider, Letterman confirmed that Danny Elfman would compose the musical score for Goosebumps, replacing Henry Jackman who had composed the director's previous films, Monsters vs. Aliens (2009) and Gulliver's Travels (2010). According to Jack Black, Elfman was the team's initial choice as they wanted someone who would compose "funny" and "scary" music and zeroed on Elfman as their perfect fit. The score was recorded during late-May and early-June 2015.

== Release ==
The soundtrack was released through Madison Gate Records digitally on October 9, 2015, a week prior to the film's release. Sony Classical Records released the album through CD on October 23, 2015. A limited edition vinyl LP was released through Music on Vinyl on January 18, 2016, and Waxwork Records on April 25, 2016, pressed through 500 copies each.

== Track listing ==
All tracks are written by Danny Elfman, except where noted.

No.	Title	Writer(s)	Length
1.	"Goosebumps"		2:11
2.	"Ferris Wheel"	Elfman; T. J. Lindgren	4:44
3.	"To the Rescue"	Elfman; Chris Bacon	1:16
4.	"Camcorder"		1:37
5.	"Ice Rink"	Elfman; Bacon	4:01
6.	"Capture"	Elfman; Bacon	1:11
7.	"Slappy"		1:48
8.	"Confession"		2:05
9.	"Slappy's Revenge"		1:43
10.	"Bus Escape"	Elfman; Paul Mounsey	1:54
11.	"Lawn Gnomes"		2:52
12.	"Ghost Hannah"		0:54
13.	"Mantis Chase"	Elfman; Bacon	2:18
14.	"Hannah's Back"		2:24
15.	"They're Here"	Elfman; Lindgren	2:29
16.	"Farewell"	Elfman; Bacon; Lindgren	5:28
17.	"Credit"		2:14
18.	"Something's Wrong"	Elfman; Lindgren	0:55
19.	"Champ"		1:18
20.	"Break In"		1:31
21.	"The Books"	Elfman; Bacon; Lindgren	4:24
22.	"Instagram"	Elfman; Mounsey	1:48
23.	"Floating Poodle"	Elfman; Lindgren	1:09
24.	"Werewolf"	Elfman; Lindgren	3:16
25.	"Lovestruck"	Elfman; Bacon	1:00
26.	"Panic"	Elfman; Bacon	2:42
27.	"On the Run"		0:58
28.	"Fun House"	Elfman; Lindgren	3:32
29.	"The Twist"		0:25
Total length:			64:07

== Reception ==
Filmtracks wrote "the whole will please enthusiasts of vintage Elfman zaniness, especially in its nicely divided album presentation." James Southall of Movie Wave stated, "it's classic, vintage Danny Elfman music, so much fun and I'm sure all the fans of his earlier Tim Burton scores will love it." Sean Wilson of MFiles wrote "Elfman's offbeat sense of humour and his ability to translate said humour into musical form is not to be sniffed at, and it's put to excellent use in the Goosebumps score, one that fits the movie like a glove whilst functioning as a solid, stand-alone listen."

The Hollywood Reporter wrote "Danny Elman's big playful Hitchcockian score provides a unifying undercurrent for the blend of CGI and old school fx make-up and puppetry involved in bringing the likes of the Praying Mantis, The Blob, The Creeps, the Vampire Poodle and all those vengeful gnomes to 3D life." Jordan Hoffman of The Guardian wrote "Danny Elfman's score keeps the proceedings moving along, and it's fair to describe the film as Tim Burton-lite." John Wirt of The Advocate described the score to be "wall-to-wall", while Brandy McDonnell of The Oklahoman called it "playfully ominous". Sandy Schaefer of Screen Rant wrote "the kooky score by Danny Elfman work best at infusing the film with a playful spirit".

== Personnel ==
- Music composer and producer – Danny Elfman
- Additional music – Chris Bacon, Paul Mounsey, TJ Lindgren
- Programming – Peter Bateman
- Recording and mixing – Dennis Sands, Noah Snyder
- Recordist – Adam Olmsted
- Technical recording engineer – Greg Maloney
- Assistant recording engineer – Ryan Hopkins
- Assistant mixing engineer – Greg Hayes, Jesse Johnstone
- Musical assistance – Melissa Karaban
- Music editor – Bill Abbott
- Assistant music editor – Denise Okimoto
- Music preparation – Rob Skinnell, Ron Vermillion, Tim Rodier
- MIDI supervision and preparation – Marc Mann
- Assistant MIDI preparation – Steve Bauman
- Auricle operator – Richard Grant
- Score production co-ordinator – Melisa McGregor
- Design – WLP Ltd.

Orchestra

- Orchestrators – Dave Slonaker, Edgardo Simone, Ed Trybek, Marc Mann, Peter Bateman, Steve Bartek, Tim Rodier
- Supervising orchestrator – Steve Bartek
- Concertmaster – Bruce Dukov
- Orchestra conductor – Pete Anthony
- Orchestra contractor – Gina Zimmitti
- Vocal contractor – Bobbi Page
- Scoring crew – David Marquette, Greg Dennen, Greg Loskorn
- Scoring stage assistant – Adam Michalak

Instruments

- Bass – Bruce Morgenthaler, Chris Kollgaard, Drew Dembowski, Mike Valerio, Oscar Hidalgo, Ed Meares
- Bassoon – Anthony Parnther, Rose Corrigan
- Cello – Armen Ksajikian, Dennis Karmazyn, Kim Scholes, Giovanna Clayton, Laszlo Mezo, Tim Loo, Trevor Handy, Vanessa Freebairn-Smith, Steve Erdody
- Clarinet – Don Foster, Ralph Williams, Stuart Clark
- Flute – Jenni Olson, Heather Clark
- French Horn – Amy Sanchez, Dan Kelley, Jenny Kim, Laura Brenes, Mark Adams, Stephanie Stetson, Teag Reaves, Allen Fogle
- Harp – Katie Kirkpatrick
- Oboe – Jessica Pearlman, Leslie Reed
- Percussion – Bob Zimmitti, Dan Greco, Peter Limonick, Sidney Hopson
- Piano – Randy Kerber
- Trombone – Alex Iles, Mike Hoffman, Phil Keen, Steve Holtman, Bill Booth
- Trumpet – Barry Perkins, Dan Rosenboom, Jon Lewis
- Tuba – Doug Tornquist
- Viola – Alma Fernandez, Carolyn Riley, David Walther, Jeanie Lim, Matt Funes, Rob Brophy, Shawn Mann, Thomas Diener, Vickie Miskolczy, Brian Dembow
- Violin – Alyssa Park, Ana Landauer, Ben Powell, Carol Pool, Darius Campo, Erik Arvinder, Grace Oh, Jackie Brand, Josefina Vergara, Julie Gigante, Julie Rogers, Katia Popov, Kevin Kumar, Maia Jasper, Marc Sazer, Natalie Leggett, Neel Hammond, Nina Evtuhov, Phil Levy, Roberto Cani, Sandy Cameron, Sara Parkins, Sarah Thornblade, Serena McKinney, Songa Lee, Tereza Stanislav, Richard Altenbach
- Woodwind – Chris Bleth

Choir

- Alto – Amy Fogerson, Ann Sheridan, Ayana Williams, Charissa Nielsen, Christy Crowl, Chyla Anderson, Clydene Jackson, Debbie Hall Gleason, Donna Medine, Edie Lehmann Boddicker, Laura Jackman, Leanna Brand
- Bass-baritone – Bob Joyce, Eric Bradley, Guy Maeda, Josh Bedlion, Reid Bruton
- Soprano – Ayana Haviv, Baraka May Williams, Bobbi Page, Diane Reynolds, Elin Carlson, Jenny Graham, Karen Whipple Schnurr, Monique Donnelly Titman, Sandie Hall, Susie Stevens Logan, Suzanne Waters, Teri Culbreath
- Tenor – A.J. Teshin, Arnold Livingston Geis, Fletcher Sheridan, Gerald White, Greg Whipple, Michael Kohl, Walt Harrah
