= Dominic Lewis =

English film and television composer (born 1985)

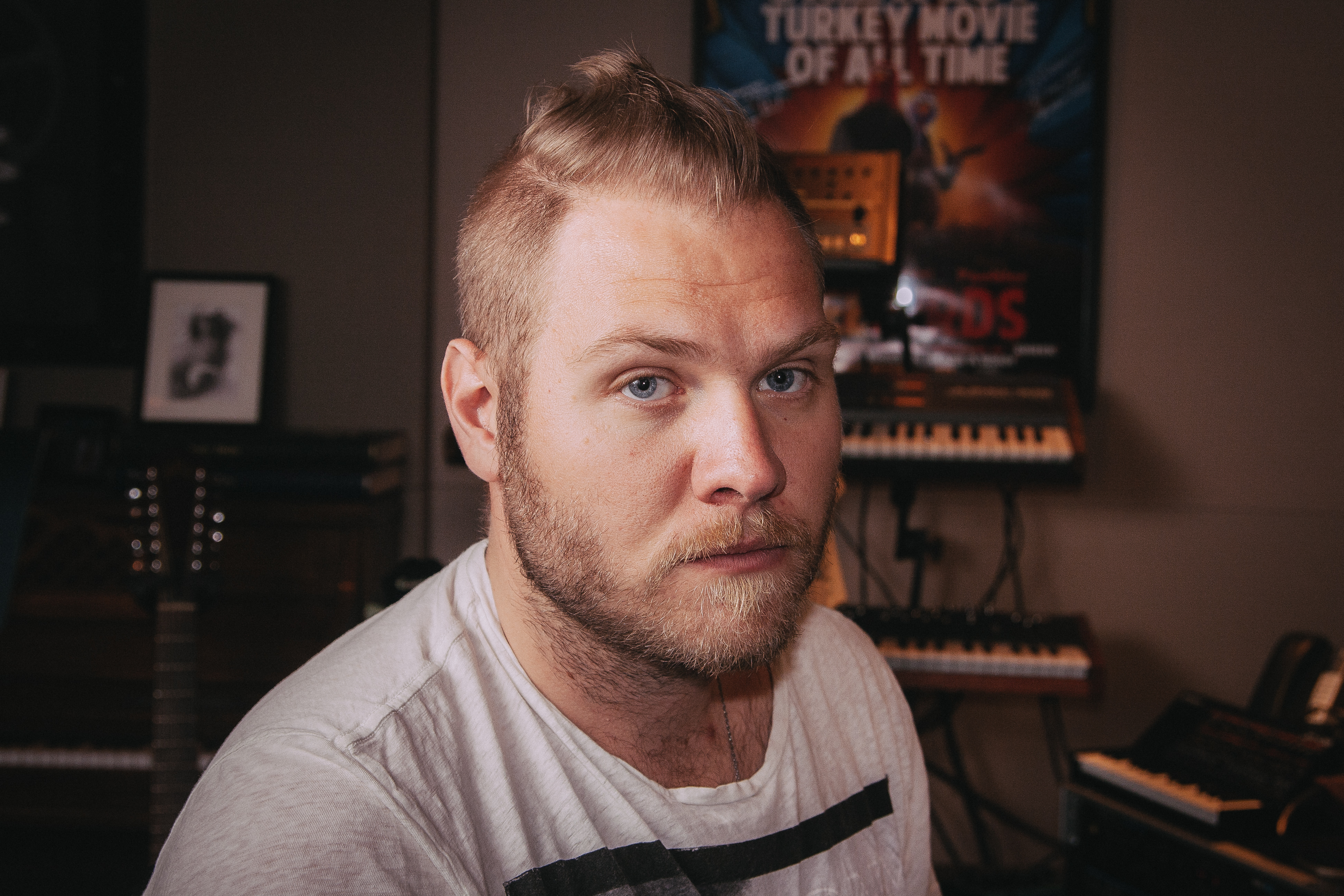
- Lewis in 2016

Background information
- Born: Dominic Alexander Charles Lewis; January 29, 1985 (age 41); London, England
- Genres: Film and television scores, pop, rock, electronic, jazz
- Occupations: Composer, singer
- Instruments: Vocals, piano, keyboards, synthesizer, guitar, cello
- Years active: 2004–present

Dominic Alexander Charles Lewis (born January 29, 1985) is an English film and television composer and singer. He first worked on various music departments for film projects before transitioning into more solo work starting with Free Birds. His other credits include The Man in the High Castle, DuckTales, Peter Rabbit, Peter Rabbit 2: The Runaway, Monsters at Work, Bullet Train, My Adventures with Superman, The Fall Guy, Karate Kid: Legends, Nobody 2 and How to Rob a Bank. He also served as the singing voice for Lurch in The Addams Family 2 and for Donald Duck in the DuckTales reboot.

== Life and career ==
Lewis was born and raised in London, England. Both his parents are musicians and he began learning the cello at age three. He also played the piano and guitar, sang in choirs, formed rock bands, and wrote songs while growing up. He cites his early influences as John Williams, Alan Silvestri, Strauss, Claude Debussy, Maurice Ravel, The Beatles, The Beach Boys, Eric Clapton, and Jimi Hendrix.

He studied at the Royal Academy of Music in London where he was classically trained in cello and music composition. During his time there, he was under the mentorship of film composer, Rupert Gregson-Williams. In 2009, Lewis relocated to Los Angeles, California to join Hans Zimmer's Remote Control Productions. He served in the music departments of various major studio films under composers Henry Jackman, John Powell and Ramin Djawadi, usually in the capacity of providing additional music.

In 2014, Lewis was nominated for the Annie Award for Outstanding Achievement in Music in an Animated Feature Production for his work on the 2013 film Free Birds. In 2015, he was nominated for the World Soundtrack Award for Discovery of the Year for the 2015 film Spooks: The Greater Good. In 2016, he scored Jodie Foster's film Money Monster in under three weeks.

Lewis's close collaboration with Henry Jackman, led to the pair scoring Amazon's The Man in the High Castle. Both Lewis and Jackman co-scored the first season, while the second, third and fourth were scored by Lewis alone. Speaking about the project, Lewis employed an orchestral method but infused it with various traditional and ethnic instruments. He also developed character themes and assigned instruments like the cello for Juliana Crain and the French horn for Joe Blake.

In 2018, Lewis was hired to score the live-action/animated comedy film Peter Rabbit directed by Will Gluck. He reunited with Gluck on the sequel, Peter Rabbit 2: The Runaway.

In 2022, he wrote the score for the film Bullet Train, marking his first collaboration with director David Leitch. Lewis and Leitch collaborated once again for the 2024 film, The Fall Guy.

In 2025, he composed the score for Karate Kid: Legends, as well as the Apple TV+ original series Your Friends & Neighbors.

== Filmography ==
=== Film ===
==== As composer ====
Year	Title	Director	Notes
2011	Gift of the Night Fury	Tom Owens	Short film Composed with John Powell
2013	Free Birds	Jimmy Hayward	First score for an animated film
2015	The DUFF	Ari Sandel	First collaboration with Ari Sandel
2015	Spooks: The Greater Good	Bharat Nalluri	Also known as MI-5
2016	Open Season: Scared Silly	David Feiss	Composed with Rupert Gregson-Williams
2016	Money Monster	Jodie Foster	Replaced Michael Andrews; Music produced by Henry Jackman
2017	Fist Fight	Richie Keen	—N/a
2017	Rough Night	Lucia Aniello	—N/a
2018	Peter Rabbit	Will Gluck	First collaboration with Will Gluck
2018	Goosebumps 2: Haunted Halloween	Ari Sandel	Second collaboration with Ari Sandel
2020	My Spy	Peter Segal	—N/a
2021	Peter Rabbit 2: The Runaway	Will Gluck	Second collaboration with Will Gluck
2021	Jolt	Tanya Wexler	—N/a
2021	The King's Man	Matthew Vaughn	Composed with Matthew Margeson
2022	Bullet Train	David Leitch	Replaced Tyler Bates; First collaboration with David Leitch
2022	Spirited	Sean Anders	Original songs by Benj Pasek and Justin Paul
2022	Violent Night	Tommy Wirkola	First collaboration with Tommy Wirkola
2024	Lift	F. Gary Gray	Composed with Guillaume Roussel
2024	The Fall Guy	David Leitch	Second collaboration with David Leitch
2025	Love Hurts	Jonathan Eusebio	
2025	Karate Kid: Legends	Jonathan Entwistle	
2025	Nobody 2	Timo Tjahjanto	Replaced David Buckley
2026	Thrash	Tommy Wirkola	Composed with Daniel Futcher; Second collaboration with Tommy Wirkola
2026	How to Rob a Bank	David Leitch	Third collaboration with David Leitch
2026	Violent Night 2	Tommy Wirkola	Third collaboration with Tommy Wirkola

==== Other credits ====
Year	Title	Role	Composer(s)
2010	Clash of the Titans	Additional music	Ramin Djawadi
2010	Gulliver's Travels	Additional music	Henry Jackman
2010	How to Train Your Dragon	Additional music arranger, programmer and orchestrator	John Powell
2011	Rio	Additional music	John Powell
2011	Rango	Additional music	Hans Zimmer
2011	Kung Fu Panda 2	Additional music	Hans Zimmer; John Powell
2011	X-Men: First Class	Additional music	Henry Jackman
2011	Puss in Boots	Additional music	Henry Jackman
2012	Wreck-It-Ralph	Additional music	Henry Jackman
2013	This Is the End	Additional music	Henry Jackman
2014	Captain America: The Winter Soldier	Additional music and featured vocalist	Henry Jackman
2014	The Amazing Spider-Man 2	Featured vocalist	Hans Zimmer; Pharrell Williams; Mike Einziger; Tom Holkenborg; Johnny Marr; Andrew Kawczynski; Steve Mazzaro
2014	Big Hero 6	Additional music	Henry Jackman
2014	Kingsman: The Secret Service	Additional music	Henry Jackman; Matthew Margeson
2020	DuckTales	Donald Duck's singing voice; Episode: "Louie's Eleven!"	Himself
2021	The Addams Family 2	Lurch's singing voice; "I Will Survive"	Mychael Danna; Jeff Danna
2023	Expend4bles	Score producer	Guillaume Roussel
2025	How to Train Your Dragon	Legacy additional music and arrangements	John Powell

=== Television ===
Year	Title	Notes
2015	Kevin from Work	10 episodes
2015	The Player	9 episodes
2015–2019	The Man in the High Castle	40 episodes, with Henry Jackman (Season 1)
2017–2021	DuckTales	69 episodes
2019–2020	The Rocketeer	22 episodes, with Beau Black
2021	Monsters at Work	14 episodes, with Daniel Futcher (Season 2)
2022	Baymax!	6 episodes
2023	Kaleidoscope	8 episodes
2023–2024	My Adventures with Superman	13 episodes, with Daniel Futcher
2025-present	Your Friends & Neighbors	19 episodes

== Awards and nominations ==
Year	Nominee / work	Award	Result
2014	Free Birds	Annie Award for Outstanding Achievement in Music in an Animated Feature Production	Nominated
2015	Spooks: The Greater Good	World Soundtrack Award for Discovery of the Year	Nominated
