= Argylle (soundtrack) =

Argylle (Soundtrack from the Apple Original Film)

Film score by Lorne Balfe
- Released: February 2, 2024
- Recorded: 2022–2024
- Genres: Film score; soundtrack
- Length: 76:31
- Labels: Platoon; Marv Music
- Producer: Lorne Balfe

Lorne Balfe chronology
| Gran Turismo (2023) | Argylle (2024) | Bad Boys: Ride or Die (2024) |

Singles from Argylle (Soundtrack from the Apple Original Film)
- 1. "Electric Energy" Released: January 26, 2024

Argylle (Soundtrack from the Apple Original Film) is the soundtrack to the 2024 film of the same name directed by Matthew Vaughn. It contains 28 tracks, with two original songs—"Electric Energy" by Ariana DeBose, Boy George and Nile Rodgers, and "Get Up and Start Again" by DeBose—and the remainder consisted instrumental tracks from the film score composed by Lorne Balfe. The former was released as a single on January 26, 2024, and the soundtrack in its entirety released on February 2, 2024, through Platoon and Marv Music.

== Development ==
Before he was officially confirmed as the film's composer in October 2022, Balfe met Vaughn during late-2020 and eventually co-wrote the themes together, due to the director and composer's similar tastes in music, particularly that of the 1980s. The score was eventually recorded at the Abbey Road Studios in London during late-2022 and completed prior to the film's release.

Balfe's score is interwoven with the needledrops throughout the script which were handpicked by Vaughn. He described at as an "enjoyable" process as Vaughn's filmography being "iconic" with the needledrops being woven into the script. For Argylle, the music supervisors Ian Neil and Danny Wareing curated around 40 songs. Lee Garrett's 1976 single "You're My Everything" is played in the dance sequence featuring Aubrey Argylle (Henry Cavill) and LaGrange (Dua Lipa) in the beginning.

The Beatles' 2023 single "Now and Then" was used in the film. The song, originally written and recorded by John Lennon in 1977, was left unfinished after Lennon's death in 1980 and eventually shelved for three decades. Balfe acquired the song over a year even though which laid the foundation of the film as well as the story. The song was used as a trigger for Elly Conway (Bryce Dallas Howard) being representative of her life. He described the song as "nostalgic" being "reminiscent of love and the past, and it just fit Elly's path so beautifully". Leona Lewis covered Snow Patrol's 2004 song "Run" which was featured in the action sequence between Conway and Aidan Wylde (Sam Rockwell). Balfe initially wanted to re-record the song with Lewis but after previous unsuccessful version of re-recording "Danger Zone" for Top Gun: Maverick (2022) with Lewis, he decided against it.

== Track listing ==
| No. | Title | Artist(s) | Length |
|---|---|---|---|
| 1. | "Mini Moke Mayhem" | | 2:20 |
| 2. | "Serve the Same Master" | | 4:08 |
| 3. | "Argylle In Hong Kong" | | 1:50 |
| 4. | "This Seat Is Taken" | | 1:40 |
| 5. | "Enjoy the Ride" | | 1:30 |
| 6. | "The Division Theme" | | 2:38 |
| 7. | "Aiden & Elly" | | 2:46 |
| 8. | "Electric Energy" | Ariana DeBose; Boy George; Nile Rodgers | 3:16 |
| 9. | "Spoon Spy" | | 1:57 |
| 10. | "The Spy Who Scratched Me" | | 2:47 |
| 11. | "Argylle in the Mirror" | | 2:40 |
| 12. | "Elly's Writing Theme" | | 2:59 |
| 13. | "Parental Misguidance" | | 1:39 |
| 14. | "Do You Think I'm Ok?" | | 3:42 |
| 15. | "Alfie" | | 5:09 |
| 16. | "Rachel's Story" | | 5:29 |
| 17. | "Al-Badr Palace" | | 3:21 |
| 18. | "Double Crosser" | | 2:07 |
| 19. | "Furocious" | | 2:30 |
| 20. | "Mama's Gotta Go to Work" | | 2:29 |
| 21. | "Careless Whisker" | | 0:30 |
| 22. | "Satellite Signals" | | 2:50 |
| 23. | "You Missed" | | 1:53 |
| 24. | "Concluding the Argylle Saga" | | 1:44 |
| 25. | "Yellow Shirt" | | 1:30 |
| 26. | "Argylle's Theme" | | 3:25 |
| 27. | "Now and Then (Argylle Symphony)" | Lorne Balfe; Adam Price | 3:55 |
| 28. | "Get Up and Start Again" | DeBose | 3:26 |
| Total length: | | | 76:10 |

== Release ==
Argylle's soundtrack was announced on January 24, 2024, that featured 28 tracks: two original songs and 26 tracks from Balfe's score. The song "Electric Energy" performed by DeBose, Boy George and Nile Rodgers was released two days later. An accompanying music video featuring the principal cast members also released on the same date. The soundtrack was released on February 2, 2024, alongside the film. It was distributed by Apple Inc.-acquired music distribution and A&R platform Platoon along with Marv Studios' music division Marv Music.

== Reception ==
Filmtracks.com praised the arrangement of the main title theme, however, "the rest lacks the cohesive sense of stylish pizzazz to make it a successful parody score while also failing to achieve convincing coolness to be taken seriously". Zanobard Reviews described it as an "endlessly fun action score" where "the way that exquisite motif is then weaved to impeccable enjoyment through thunderous action highs and heartfelt lows makes this soundtrack well worth a listen". Anton Smit of Soundtrack World described it as an "outstanding score by Lorne Balfe for a very entertaining film." Music critic Jonathan Broxton of Movie Music UK wrote "Argylle really is a perfect example of what a good excellent contemporary action score can be. It uses large orchestral and choral forces blended with an appropriate amount of electronic enhancements, acknowledges the familiar espionage movie soundtrack tropes without being a slave to them, contains at least three memorable recurring thematic ideas, and engages in some creative, propulsive, exciting action music that uses elements of one or more of those themes in a variety of interesting ways." Johnny Oleksinski of New York Post criticized it as a "cliched musical score that never pipes down". Pete Hammond of Deadline Hollywood described it as "terrific and atmospheric".
