= Kingsman: The Secret Service (soundtrack) =

Kingsman: The Secret Service (Original Motion Picture Score)

Soundtrack album by Henry Jackman and Matthew Margeson
- Released: 13 February 2015
- Recorded: 2014
- Genre: Film score
- Length: 57:27
- Label: La-La Land Records

Kingsman chronology
Kingsman: The Secret Service (2015)	Kingsman: The Golden Circle (2017)

Henry Jackman chronology
The Interview (2014)	Kingsman: The Secret Service (2015)	Pixels (2015)

Matthew Margeson chronology
Kick-Ass 2 (2013)	Kingsman: The Secret Service (2015)	Scouts Guide to the Zombie Apocalypse (2015)

Kingsman: The Secret Service is the soundtrack to the film of the same name, composed by Henry Jackman and Matthew Margeson. It was released on CD on February 13, 2015 by La-La Land Records.

== Track listing ==
All music is composed by Henry Jackman and Matthew Margeson.

No.	Title	Length
1.	"Manners Maketh Man"	1:38
2.	"The Medallion"	2:14
3.	"Valentine"	2:25
4.	"To Become a Kingsman"	4:19
5.	"Pick a Puppy"	2:13
6.	"Drinks with Valentine"	2:40
7.	"Skydiving"	3:37
8.	"Shame We Had to Grow Up"	1:56
9.	"Kentucky Christians*"	2:37
10.	"Curious Scars and Implants"	3:09
11.	"Toast to a Kingsman"	1:56
12.	"An 1815 Napoleonic Brandy"	4:23
13.	"Eat, Drink, and Paaaaarty"	1:54
14.	"Calculated Infiltration"	7:54
15.	"Out of Options*"	1:48
16.	"Hand on the Machine"	2:22
17.	"Finale"	3:56
18.	"Original Valentine Ideas (Demo Suite)*"	6:25
Total length:		57:27

(*included only on CD)

Songs not included in the soundtrack, but featured in the film include the following:

- Dire Straits – "Money for Nothing"
- Dizzee Rascal – "Bonkers"
- Rudimental (feat. John Newman) – "Feel the Love"
- Lynyrd Skynyrd – "Free Bird"
- Edward Elgar – "Pomp & Circumstance"
- KC & The Sunshine Band – "Give It Up"
- Bryan Ferry – "Slave to Love"
- Take That – "Get Ready for It"
- Iggy Azalea (featuring Ellie Goulding) – "Heavy Crown"
