= Peter Rabbit (soundtrack) =

Peter Rabbit (Original Motion Picture Score)

Film score by Dominic Lewis
- Released: April 13, 2018
- Recorded: December 10–19, 2017
- Studios: Trackdown Studios, Sydney
- Genre: Film score
- Length: 30:22
- Label: Madison Gate Records
- Producer: Dominic Lewis

Dominic Lewis chronology
Rough Night (2017)	Peter Rabbit (2018)	Goosebumps 2: Haunted Halloween (2018)

Peter Rabbit (Original Motion Picture Score) is the film score soundtrack to the 2018 film Peter Rabbit directed by Will Gluck. The film's musical score is composed by Dominic Lewis and was released through Madison Gate Records on April 13, 2018.

== Development ==
In September 2017, it was reported that Dominic Lewis would compose music for Peter Rabbit. Will Gluck wanted the score "to be big and British" and zeroed in on Lewis as the perfect fit. Since Gluck's previous ventures had not used composers, as mainly licensed music had been prominent with film, Lewis approached it with a song base, with drums, bass, guitar, piano, and a huge orchestra to bring an "epic and movie-like" structure. This allowed him to balance the film's traditional and more modern aspects. The British sounds mainly curated from Lewis' inspirations of the British bands such as The Beatles, The Who, The Smiths, The Jam, The Rolling Stones, Fitz and the Tantrums, Vampire Weekend for the jazz, pop and rock influences and Edward Elgar, Ralph Vaughan Williams and Benjamin Britten's works for the classical portions in the opening. Lewis used an harpsichord, honky-tonk piano and Rickenbacker guitars, which were used by the Beatles, that provided him "a fusion of classic rock ‘n’ roll English pop with classical English music". He described the sonic palette as a blend of his orchestral ambitions with Gluck's musical ideas.

Lewis did not write any song except for the main theme of Peter Rabbit which is featured in the opening credits, which had vocals provided by himself and a huge orchestral arrangement. He cited the Beatles' "The Long and Winding Road" as an inspiration to the theme. For the rest of the score, Lewis approached themes like the songs; He considered it as a traditional approach in terms of thematic materials, but a song-like approach in terms of instrumentation and the sonic pattern.

The orchestra performed for Peter Rabbit, was the biggest which Lewis had worked with. It accompanied fifty strings, double woods, six horns, four trumpets, four trombones, tuba and then a harp, timpani, snare-drum, harpsichord, pianos, guitar, bass, drums which were an overdub. He summarized that "a lot of the leitmotivs are stylistically baroque-like, even Bach-ian" but wanted it to be lush in terms of orchestration. For the emotional undertones, he approached the Vaughan Williams aspects, while also being inspired from Maurice Ravel's orchestration aspects. The score was recorded at the Trackdown Studios, Sydney from December 10–19, 2017, and the final mixing happened on December 23.

== Release ==
In February 2018, it was reported that Ezra Koenig of the Vampire Weekend had co-wrote a song "I Promise You" with Gluck and Theodore Shapiro, which was produced by Lewis himself. The song itself featured three different versions; one performed by James Corden who voiced the titular Peter Rabbit, another version by Shana Halligan, Katharine Hoye, Fletcher Sheridan and Chris Mannas and a demo of the song performed by Koenig himself. Columbia Records released a single on February 9, which included Corden's version of the song with the theme suite composed by Lewis. Koenig's demo of "I Promise You" released on February 16. The score album was released by Madison Gate Records on April 13, two months after the film.

== Track listing ==
No.	Title	Length
1.	"Rascal Rebel Rabbit"	1:53
2.	"The Tale of Peter Rabbit"	1:33
3.	"Mr. McGregor's Garden"	1:41
4.	"The Jacket"	1:25
5.	"Bunnies on Broomsticks"	1:17
6.	"Dressing on the Side"	0:56
7.	"Garden Games"	1:51
8.	"Benji Rescue"	1:39
9.	"Wet Hare"	0:56
10.	"Scuffling Scuttlebutts"	1:30
11.	"Rabicide"	1:09
12.	"Arms Up"	2:06
13.	"Dies EARae"	1:51
14.	"Wistful Windemere"	1:25
15.	"Sawrey"	1:36
16.	"Mission Impawsible"	3:09
17.	"Bea"	1:05
18.	"Hawkshead"	1:48
19.	"1902"	1:32
Total length:		30:22

== Reception ==
Kaya Savas of Film.Music.Media rated four-and-a-half of five and summarized "Expert craftsmanship, organic emotion, and melodic hooks make Peter Rabbit something really special." Nikki Baughan of Screen International wrote "the poppy soundtrack keeps things moving along". Peter Debruge of Variety and Glenn Kenny of The New York Times called the score as "bombastic" and "exceptional".

== Additional music ==
- "Small As Your Dreams" – Katharine Hoye, Jessica Freedman, Chad C. Reisser and Fletcher Sheridan
- "We No Speak Americano" – Yolanda Be Cool and DCUP
- "M79" – Vampire Weekend
- "Steal My Sunshine" – Len
- "Steal My Sunshine" (Film Version) – Len
- "Roll Up" – Fitz and the Tantrums
- "Feel It Still" – Portugal. The Man
- "Flashdance... What a Feeling" – David Das
- "Time Bomb" – Rancid
- "Schwanengesang, D.957: No. 4. Ständchen" – Franz Schubert
- "Do Your Thing" – Basement Jaxx
- "In A Big Country" – Big Country
- "Crash into Me" – Dave Matthews Band
- "Anvil Chorus from Il Trovatore" – Hungarian State Opera Orchestra and Budapest Festival Chorus
- "The Kids Don't Stand A Chance" – Vampire Weekend
- "Love Love Love" – Avalanche City
- "Rock-a-bye Baby" – Traditional
- "Remember the Name" – Fort Minor
- "Cousins" – Vampire Weekend
- "When Life Gives Me Lemons I Make Lemonade" – The Boy Least Likely To
- "Fight Song" – Rachel Platten
- "Rather Be" – Marc Scibilia
- "I'm Gonna Be (500 Miles)" – The Proclaimers
- "Concerto for Oboe in C Major, Op. 7, No. 12" – Tomaso Albinoni
- "I Promise You" – Shana Halligan, Katharine Hoye, Fletcher Sheridan and Chris Mann
- "I Promise You" – James Corden
- "I Promise You (Ezra's Demo)" – Ezra Koenig

== Accolades ==
Award	Date	Category	Recipients	Result	Ref.
AACTA Awards	December 3, 2018	Best Original Music Score	Dominic Lewis	Won	
Australian Screen Sound Guild	November 24, 2018	Soundtrack of the Year	Peter Rabbit	Nominated	
Australian Screen Sound Guild	November 24, 2018	Best Film Sound Recording	Peter Rabbit	Nominated	
Guild of Music Supervisors Awards	February 13, 2019	Best Music Supervision for Films Budgeted Over $25 Million	Wende Crowley	Nominated	
Hollywood Music in Media Awards	November 14, 2018	Best Original Song – Animated Film	"I Promise You" – written by Ezra Koenig; performed by James Corden	Nominated	
