= Julia Roberts filmography =

Filmography of an actress: Julia Roberts

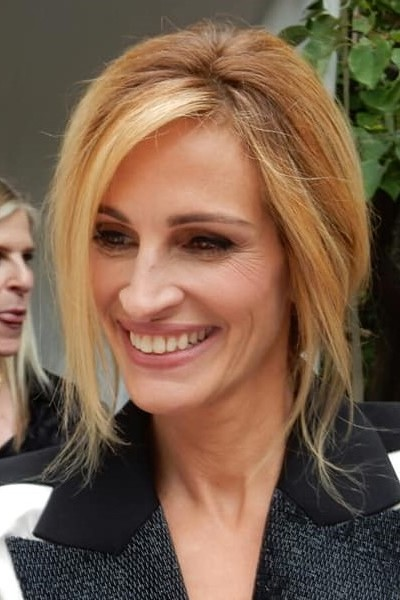
Roberts at the 2018 Toronto International Film Festival

Julia Roberts is an American actress and producer who made her debut in the 1987 direct-to-video feature Firehouse. She had her breakthrough the following year by starring in the coming-of-age film Mystic Pizza (1988). For her supporting role in the comedy-drama Steel Magnolias (1989), she won the Golden Globe Award for Best Supporting Actress. Roberts' next role was opposite Richard Gere in the highly successful romantic comedy Pretty Woman (1990), for which she won the Golden Globe Award for Best Actress – Musical or Comedy. In 1991, she appeared in the psychological thriller Sleeping with the Enemy, and played Tinker Bell in the Steven Spielberg-directed fantasy adventure Hook. Two years later, Roberts starred in the legal thriller The Pelican Brief, an adaptation of the John Grisham novel of the same name. During the late 1990s, she played the lead in the romantic comedies My Best Friend's Wedding (1997), Notting Hill (1999), and Runaway Bride (1999).

In 2000, Roberts became the first actress to earn $20 million, for playing the eponymous environmental activist in the Steven Soderbergh-directed biographical film Erin Brockovich. Her performance won her the Academy Award for Best Actress, the BAFTA Award for Best Actress in a Leading Role, and the Golden Globe Award for Best Actress – Drama. The following year, she starred in the romantic comedy America's Sweethearts (2001), and reteamed with Soderbergh on the comedy heist remake Ocean's Eleven (2001). Roberts appeared in the 2003 drama, Mona Lisa Smile, which earned her a then record $25 million salary. The following year, she starred in the romantic drama Closer (2004), and also reprised her role in the sequel, Ocean's Twelve (2004). In 2006, she lent her voice to two animated films: The Ant Bully, and Charlotte's Web. Roberts went on to appear in the comedy-dramas Charlie Wilson's War (2007) and Eat Pray Love (2010), following which she starred in August: Osage County (2013), for which she was nominated for the Academy Award for Best Supporting Actress. In 2016, Roberts played a television producer in the thriller Money Monster and the following year, she played a mother coping with her son's Treacher Collins syndrome in the comedy-drama Wonder.

Roberts made her television debut in the drama series Crime Story in 1987. She appeared in the crime drama series Miami Vice, and the television film Baja Oklahoma (both in 1988). In 1996, Roberts guest starred on the television sitcom Friends. Roberts's guest star appearance on the police procedural/legal drama Law & Order in 1999 earned her a nomination for the Primetime Emmy Award for Outstanding Guest Actor in a Drama Series. She has, as of 2014, served as an executive producer on four films in the American Girl film series. The first three were television films while the fourth, Kit Kittredge: An American Girl, had a theatrical release in 2008. In 2014, Roberts provided narration for an episode of the documentary series Makers: Women Who Make America, and appeared in the film The Normal Heart. Her role in the latter earned Roberts a nomination for the Primetime Emmy Award for Outstanding Supporting Actress in a Miniseries or a Movie.

== Film ==
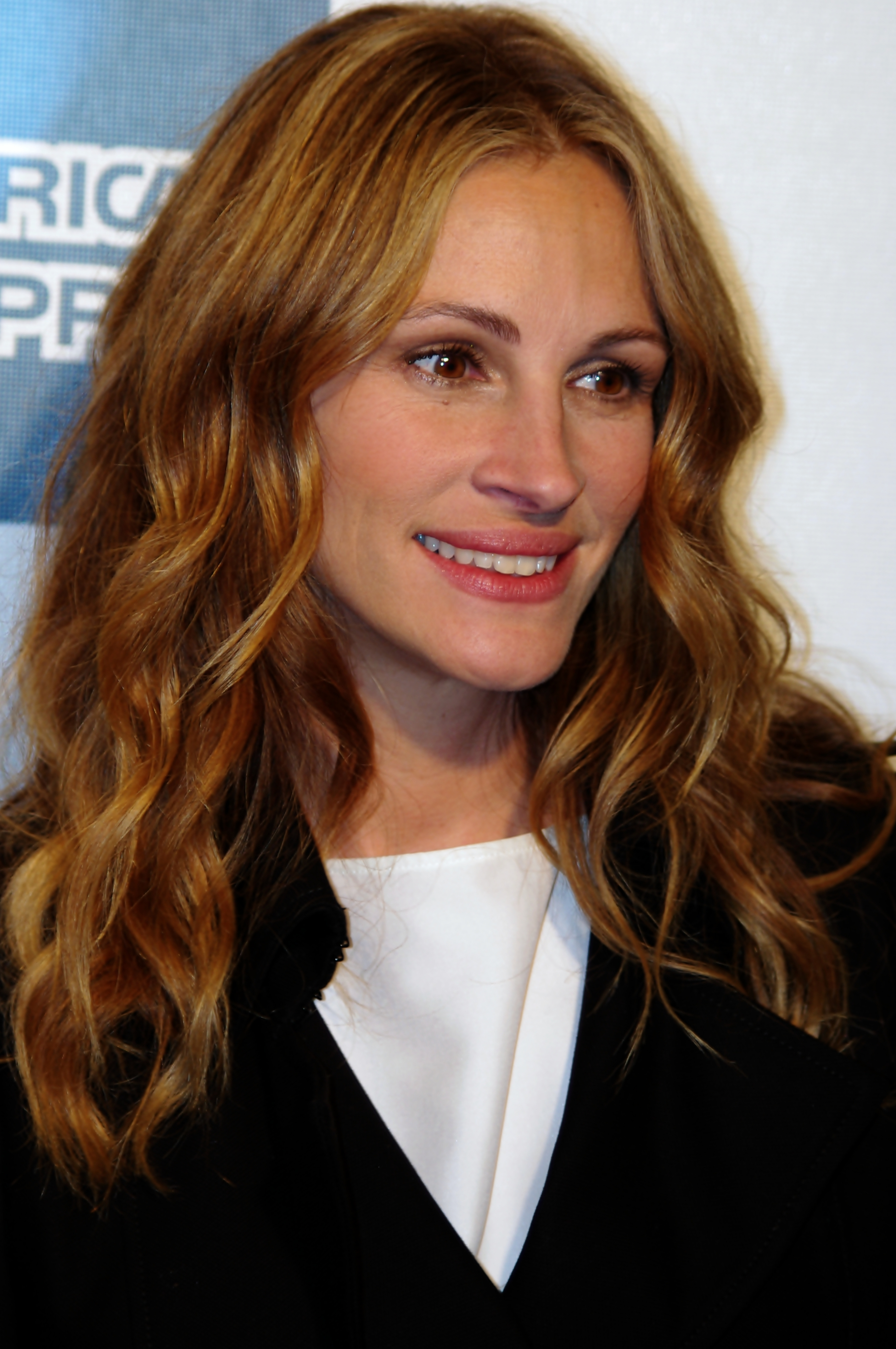
Roberts attending the premiere of Jesus Henry Christ in 2011

Julia Roberts filmography
Year	Title	Role	Notes	Ref.
1987	Firehouse	Babs	Uncredited; direct-to-video release	
1988	Satisfaction	Daryle Shane		
1988	Mystic Pizza	Daisy Araújo		
1989	Blood Red	Marisa Collogero	Filmed in 1986	
1989	Steel Magnolias	Shelby Eatenton Latcherie		
1990	Pretty Woman	Vivian Ward		
1990	Flatliners	Rachel Mannus		
1991	Sleeping with the Enemy	Laura Williams Burney / Sara Waters		
1991	Dying Young	Hilary O'Neil		
1991	Hook	Tinker Bell		
1992	The Player	Herself	Cameo	
1993	The Pelican Brief	Darby Shaw		
1994	I Love Trouble	Sabrina Peterson		
1994	Prêt-à-Porter	Anne Eisenhower		
1995	Something to Talk About	Grace King Bichon		
1996	Mary Reilly	Mary Reilly		
1996	Michael Collins	Kitty Kiernan		
1996	Everyone Says I Love You	Von Sidell		
1997	My Best Friend's Wedding	Julianne Potter		
1997	Conspiracy Theory	Alice Sutton		
1998	Stepmom	Isabel Kelly	Also executive producer	
1999	Notting Hill	Anna Scott		
1999	Runaway Bride	Maggie Carpenter		
2000	Erin Brockovich	Erin Brockovich		
2001	The Mexican	Samantha Barzel		
2001	America's Sweethearts	Kiki Harrison		
2001	Ocean's Eleven	Tess Ocean		
2002	Grand Champion	Jolene		
2002	Full Frontal	Francesca / Catherine		
2002	Confessions of a Dangerous Mind	Patricia Watson		
2003	Mona Lisa Smile	Katherine Ann Watson		
2004	Tell Them Who You Are	Herself		
2004	Closer	Anna Cameron		
2004	Ocean's Twelve	Tess Ocean		
2006	The Ant Bully	Hova	Voice	
2006	Charlotte's Web	Charlotte	Voice	
2007	Charlie Wilson's War	Joanne Herring		
2008	Fireflies in the Garden	Lisa Taylor		
2008	Kit Kittredge: An American Girl	—N/a	Executive producer	
2009	Duplicity	Claire Stenwick		
2010	Valentine's Day	Captain Kate Hazeltine		
2010	Eat Pray Love	Elizabeth Gilbert		
2011	Jesus Henry Christ	—N/a	Executive producer	
2011	Love, Wedding, Marriage	Ava's Therapist	Voice	
2011	Larry Crowne	Mercedes Tainot		
2012	Mirror, Mirror	Queen Clementianna		
2013	August: Osage County	Barbara Fordham		
2015	Secret in Their Eyes	Jess Cobb		
2016	Mother's Day	Miranda Collins		
2016	Money Monster	Patty Fenn		
2017	Smurfs: The Lost Village	Smurf Willow	Voice	
2017	Wonder	Isabel Pullman		
2018	Ben Is Back	Holly Burns		
2022	Ticket to Paradise	Georgia Cotton	Also executive producer	
2023	Leave the World Behind	Amanda Sandford	Also producer	
2025	After the Hunt	Alma Imhoff		
2027	Panic Carefully †	TBA	Post-production; also producer	

Key
†	Denotes films that have not yet been released

== Television ==
Julia Roberts in TV series
Year	Title	Role	Notes	Ref.
1987	Crime Story	Tracy Altman	Episode: "The Survivor"	
1988	Miami Vice	Polly Wheeler	Episode: "Mirror Image"	
1988	Baja Oklahoma	Cannot Hutchins	Television film	
1995	Before Your Eyes: Angelie's Secret	Narrator	Television film	
1996	Friends	Susie Moss	Episode: "The One After the Superbowl"	
1998	Murphy Brown	Herself	Episode: "Never Can Say Goodbye"	
1999	Law & Order	Katrina Ludlow	Episode: "Empire"	
2000	Silent Angels: The Rett Syndrome Story	Narrator	Television film	
2000	Nature	Herself	Episode: "Wild Horses of Mongolia with Julia Roberts"	
2003	Queens Supreme	—N/a	Executive producer	
2003	Freedom: A History of US	Virginia Eyewitness / Appleton's Journal	2 episodes	
2004	Samantha: An American Girl Holiday	—N/a	Executive producer; television film	
2005	Felicity: An American Girl Adventure	—N/a	Executive producer; television film	
2006	Beslan: Three Days In September	Narrator	Documentary	
2006	Molly: An American Girl on the Home Front	—N/a	Executive producer; television film	
2011	Extraordinary Moms	Presenter	Documentary; also executive producer	
2014	The Normal Heart	Dr. Emma Brookner	Television film	
2014	Makers: Women Who Make America	Narrator	Episode: "Women in Hollywood"	
2017	Running Wild with Bear Grylls	Herself	Episode: "Julia Roberts"	
2018	Homecoming	Heidi Bergman	10 episodes; also executive producer	
2022	Gaslit	Martha Mitchell	8 episodes; also executive producer	
2024	Knuckles	Vivian Ward	Episode: "The Shabbat Dinner"; archive footage from Pretty Woman	
2025	Leonard and Hungry Paul	Narrator	Series based on Rónán Hession's novel	

== Theater ==
Julia Roberts in plays
Year	Title	Role	Playwright	Notes	Ref.
2006	Three Days of Rain	Nan / Lina	Richard Greenberg	Bernard B. Jacobs Theatre, Broadway	

== See also ==
- List of awards and nominations received by Julia Roberts
