= List of awards and nominations received by Julia Roberts =

Julia Roberts awards and nominations
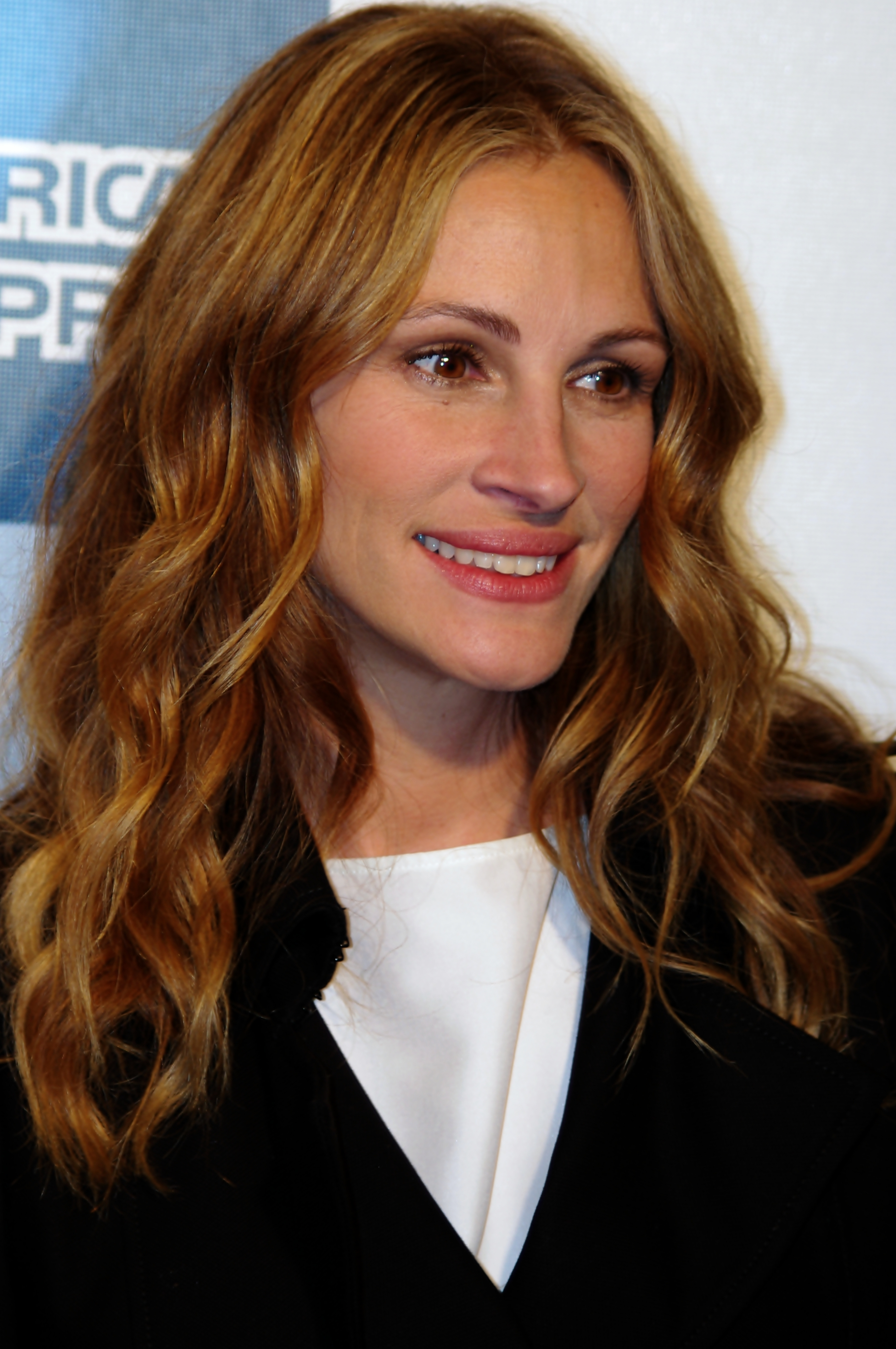
- Roberts at the Tribeca Film Festival in 2011
Awards and nominations
Award	Wins	Nominations
Academy Awards	1	4
Screen Actors Guild Award	1	4
BAFTA Awards	1	3
Critics' Choice	1	5
Emmy Awards	0	2
Golden Globes	3	11

Totals (Note: Certain award groups do not simply award one winner. They acknowledge several different recipients, have runners-up, and have third place. Since this is a specific recognition and is different from losing an award, runner-up mentions are considered wins in this award tally. For simplification and to avoid errors, each award in this list has been presumed to have had a prior nomination.)
- Wins: 36
- Nominations: 102

Julia Roberts is an American actress and producer. She is known for her leading roles on stage and screen. Throughout her career she has received various accolades including an Academy Award, a British Academy Film Award, a Critics' Choice Movie Award, three Golden Globe Awards and a Screen Actors Guild Award, as well as a nomination for two Primetime Emmy Awards. She has been honored with an Honorary César in 2025 and was made a Knight of the Order of Arts and Letters from the French Minister of Culture Rachida Dati in 2025.

Roberts gained prominence for her early role in the romantic comedy-drama Mystic Pizza (1988) for which she was nominated for the Independent Spirit Award for Best Female Lead. She played a young woman who died of diabetes in the dramedy Steel Magnolias (1989) earning nominations for the Academy Award and Golden Globe Award for Best Supporting Actress, winning the latter. She gained stardom playing a prostitute in the romantic comedy Pretty Woman (1990) earning widespread notoriety as well as a Golden Globe Award for Best Actress in a Motion Picture – Musical or Comedy and nominations for the Academy Award and the BAFTA Award for Best Actress. She earned Golden Globe Award for Best Actress in a Motion Picture – Musical or Comedy nominations for her romantic comedy roles in My Best Friend's Wedding (1997) and in Notting Hill (1999).

She portrayed the title role in the biographical legal drama Erin Brockovich (2000) earning the Academy Award for Best Actress as well as the BAFTA Award, the Critics' Choice Movie Award, the Golden Globe Award, and the Screen Actors Guild Award for Best Actress. She then was Critics' Choice-nominated for her roles in Closer (2004) and Ocean's 12 (2004) and Golden Globe-nominated for Charlie Wilson's War (2007), and Duplicity (2009). She played the eldest daughter in a southern family in the tragicomedy August: Osage County (2013) earning nominations for the Academy Award, BAFTA Award, Critics' Choice Award, Golden Globe Award, and Screen Actors Guild Award for Best Supporting Actress.

On television, she earned Primetime Emmy Award nominations for the Outstanding Guest Actress in a Drama Series for playing a psychopathic murderer in the NBC crime drama series Law & Order (1999) and the Outstanding Supporting Actress in a Limited Series or Movie for portraying Dr. Emma Brookner in the HBO television film Normal Heart (2014). She earned a Golden Globe Award for Best Actress – Television Series Drama nomination for playing a social worker in Homecoming (2018) and the Golden Globe Award for Best Actress – Miniseries or Television Film nomination for portraying Martha Mitchell in the Starz limited series Gaslit (2022). On theater, she made her Broadway debut in the Richard Greenberg play Three Days of Rain (2006), earning a nomination for the Drama League Distinguished Performance Award.

== Major associations ==
=== Academy Awards ===
Year	Category	Nominated work	Result	Ref.
1990	Best Supporting Actress	Steel Magnolias	Nominated	
1991	Best Actress	Pretty Woman	Nominated	
2001	Best Actress	Erin Brockovich	Won	
2014	Best Supporting Actress	August: Osage County	Nominated	

=== Actor Awards ===
Year	Category	Nominated work	Result	Ref.
2001	Outstanding Female Actor in a Leading Role	Erin Brockovich	Won	
2014	Outstanding Female Actor in a Supporting Role	August: Osage County	Nominated	
2014	Outstanding Cast in a Motion Picture	August: Osage County	Nominated	
2015	Outstanding Female Actor in a Miniseries or Television Movie	The Normal Heart	Nominated	

=== BAFTA Awards ===
Year	Category	Nominated work	Result	Ref.
British Academy Film Awards
1991	Best Actress in a Leading Role	Pretty Woman	Nominated	
2001	Best Actress in a Leading Role	Erin Brockovich	Won	
2014	Best Actress in a Supporting Role	August: Osage County	Nominated	

=== Critics' Choice Awards ===
Year	Category	Nominated work	Result	Ref.
Critics' Choice Movie Awards
2001	Best Actress	Erin Brockovich	Won	
2005	Best Acting Ensemble	Closer	Nominated	
2005	Best Acting Ensemble	Ocean's Twelve	Nominated	
2014	Best Acting Ensemble	August: Osage County	Nominated	
2014	Best Supporting Actress	August: Osage County	Nominated	
Critics' Choice Television Awards
2014	Best Supporting Actress in a Movie/Miniseries	The Normal Heart	Nominated	
2023	Best Actress in a Movie/Miniseries	Gaslit	Nominated	

=== Emmy Awards ===
Year	Category	Nominated work	Result	Ref.
Primetime Emmy Awards
1999	Outstanding Guest Actress in a Drama Series	Law & Order	Nominated	
2014	Outstanding Supporting Actress in a Limited Series or Movie	The Normal Heart	Nominated	

=== Golden Globe Awards ===
Year	Category	Nominated work	Result	Ref.
1990	Best Supporting Actress – Motion Picture	Steel Magnolias	Won	
1991	Best Actress in a Motion Picture – Musical or Comedy	Pretty Woman	Won	
1998	Best Actress in a Motion Picture – Musical or Comedy	My Best Friend's Wedding	Nominated	
2000	Best Actress in a Motion Picture – Musical or Comedy	Notting Hill	Nominated	
2001	Best Actress in a Motion Picture – Drama	Erin Brockovich	Won	
2008	Best Supporting Actress – Motion Picture	Charlie Wilson's War	Nominated	
2010	Best Actress in a Motion Picture – Musical or Comedy	Duplicity	Nominated	
2014	Best Supporting Actress – Motion Picture	August: Osage County	Nominated	
2019	Best Actress – Television Series Drama	Homecoming	Nominated	
2023	Best Actress – Miniseries or Television Film	Gaslit	Nominated	
2026	Best Actress in a Motion Picture – Drama	After the Hunt	Nominated	

== Miscellaneous awards ==
Organizations	Year	Category	Nominated work	Result	Ref.
AACTA Awards	2014	Best International Supporting Actress – Cinema	August: Osage County	Nominated	
AARP Movies for Grownups Awards	2026	Best Actress	After the Hunt	Nominated	
Blockbuster Entertainment Awards	1998	Favorite Actress – Suspense	Conspiracy Theory	Won	
Blockbuster Entertainment Awards	1998	Favorite Actress – Comedy	My Best Friend's Wedding	Won	
Blockbuster Entertainment Awards	1999	Favorite Actress – Drama	Stepmom	Won	
Blockbuster Entertainment Awards	2000	Favorite Actress – Comedy / Romance	Notting Hill	Nominated	
Blockbuster Entertainment Awards	2000	Favorite Actress – Comedy / Romance	Runaway Bride	Nominated	
Blockbuster Entertainment Awards	2001	Favorite Actress – Drama	Erin Brockovich	Won	
Drama League Awards	2006	Distinguished Performance Award	Three Days of Rain	Nominated	
Empire Awards	2001	Best Actress	Erin Brockovich	Nominated	
Golden Raspberry Awards	1992	Worst Supporting Actress	Hook	Nominated	
Hollywood Film Festival	2013	Supporting Actress of the Year	August: Osage County	Nominated	
Hollywood Film Festival	2013	Ensemble of the Year	August: Osage County	Won	
Independent Spirit Awards	1989	Best Female Lead	Mystic Pizza	Nominated	
MTV Movie Awards	1992	Best Female Performance	Dying Young	Nominated	
MTV Movie Awards	1992	Most Desirable Female	Dying Young	Nominated	
MTV Movie Awards	1994	Best Female Performance	The Pelican Brief	Nominated	
MTV Movie Awards	1998	Best Female Performance	My Best Friend's Wedding	Nominated	
MTV Movie Awards	2000	Best Female Performance	Runaway Bride	Nominated	
MTV Movie Awards	2001	Best Female Performance	Erin Brockovich	Won	
MTV Movie Awards	2001	Best Line from a Movie (Note: (For “Bite my ass, Krispy Kreme!”))	Erin Brockovich	Nominated	
MTV Movie Awards	2001	Most Desirable Female	Erin Brockovich	Nominated	
Nickelodeon Kids' Choice Awards	1991	Favorite Movie Actress	Pretty Woman	Won	
Nickelodeon Kids' Choice Awards	1999	Favorite Movie Actress	Stepmom	Nominated	
Nickelodeon Kids' Choice Awards	2000	Favorite Movie Actress	Notting Hill / Runaway Bride	Nominated	
Nickelodeon Kids' Choice Awards	2000	Favorite Movie Couple (shared with Hugh Grant)	Notting Hill	Nominated	
Nickelodeon Kids' Choice Awards	2007	Favorite Voice From an Animated Movie	The Ant Bully	Nominated	
Nickelodeon Kids' Choice Awards	2013	Favorite Villain	Mirror Mirror	Nominated	
Palm Springs International Film Festival	2014	Spotlight Award	August: Osage County	Won	
People's Choice Awards	1998	Favorite Movie Actress	My Best Friend's Wedding	Won	
People's Choice Awards	1999	Favorite Movie Actress	Stepmom	Nominated	
People's Choice Awards	2000	Favorite Movie Actress	Notting Hill / Runaway Bride	Won	
People's Choice Awards	2001	Favorite Movie Actress	Erin Brockovich	Won	
People's Choice Awards	2002	Favorite Movie Actress	America's Sweethearts / The Mexican / Ocean's Eleven	Won	
People's Choice Awards	2003	Favorite Movie Actress	Confessions of a Dangerous Mind / Full Frontal	Won	
People's Choice Awards	2004	Favorite Movie Actress	Mona Lisa Smile	Won	
People's Choice Awards	2005	Favorite Movie Actress	Closer / Ocean's Twelve	Won	
People's Choice Awards	2011	Favorite Movie Actress	Eat Pray Love / Valentine's Day	Nominated	
People's Choice Awards	2012	Favorite Movie Actress	Larry Crowne	Nominated	
People's Choice Awards	2017	Favorite Dramatic Movie Actress	Money Monster	Nominated	
Satellite Awards	1998	Best Actress in a Motion Picture	My Best Friend's Wedding	Nominated	
Satellite Awards	2000	Best Actress in a Motion Picture	Notting Hill	Nominated	
Satellite Awards	2001	Best Actress in a Motion Picture	Erin Brockovich	Nominated	
Satellite Awards	2014	Best Supporting Actress in a Motion Picture	August: Osage County	Nominated	
Satellite Awards	2019	Best Actress in a Miniseries or Television Movie	Homecoming	Nominated	
Satellite Awards	2019	Best Actress in a Television Series Drama	Homecoming	Won	
Saturn Awards	1991	Best Supporting Actress in a Film	Flatliners	Nominated	
Saturn Awards	1992	Best Actress in a Film	Sleeping with the Enemy	Nominated	
Saturn Awards	2023	Best Actress in a Miniseries or Television Film	Gaslit	Nominated	
Teen Choice Awards	2000	Choice Actress	Erin Brockovich	Won	
Teen Choice Awards	2001	Choice Chemistry (shared with Brad Pitt)	The Mexican	Nominated	
Young Artist Awards	1989	Best Young Actress in a Motion Picture – Drama	Mystic Pizza	Nominated	

== Critics awards ==
Organizations	Year	Category	Nominated work	Result	Ref.
Alliance of Women Film Journalists Awards	2013	Best Ensemble Cast	August: Osage County	Nominated	
Boston Society of Film Critics Awards	2000	Best Actress	Erin Brockovich	3rd Place	
Chicago Film Critics Association	2000	Best Actress	Erin Brockovich	Nominated	
Dallas–Fort Worth Film Critics Association	2000	Best Actress	Erin Brockovich	Runner-up	
Dallas–Fort Worth Film Critics Association	2013	Best Supporting Actress	August: Osage County	Nominated	
Detroit Film Critics Society	2013	Best Supporting Actress	August: Osage County	Nominated	
Detroit Film Critics Society	2013	Best Ensemble		Nominated	
London Film Critics' Circle	2000	Actress of the Year	Erin Brockovich	Won	
Los Angeles Film Critics Association	2000	Best Actress	Erin Brockovich	Won	
National Board of Review Awards	1994	Best Cast	Prêt-à-Porter	Won	
National Board of Review Awards	2000	Best Actress	Erin Brockovich	Won	
National Board of Review Awards	2004	Best Cast	Closer	Won	
Online Film Critics Society	2000	Best Actress	Erin Brockovich	Nominated	
San Diego Film Critics Society	2000	Best Actress	Erin Brockovich	Won	
Washington D.C. Area Film Critics Association	2013	Best Ensemble	August: Osage County	Nominated	
Women Film Critics Circle	2013	Best Ensemble	August: Osage County	Nominated	

== Honorary awards ==
Organizations	Year	Award	Result	Ref.
Academy Museum of Motion Pictures	2022	Gala Icon Award	Honored	
American Society of Cinematographers	2011	Governor's Award	Honored	
César Awards	2025	Honorary César	Honored	
French Minister of Culture Rachida Dati	2025	Knight of the Order of Arts and Letters (Note: Chevalier de l'Ordre des Arts et des Lettres) for her significant contribution to world cinema)	Honored	
George Eastman Museum	2019	George Eastman Award	Honored	
San Sebastian Film Festival	2010	Donostia Lifetime Achievement Award	Honored	
