= The Pelican Brief =

1992 novel by John Grisham

- First edition cover
- Author: John Grisham
- Language: English
- Genre: Legal thriller novel
- Publisher: Doubleday
- Publication date: 1992
- Publication place: United States
- Media type: Print (Hardcover, Paperback)
- Pages: 386 pages (mass market paperback)
- ISBN: 0-385-42198-2
- OCLC: 25990887
- Dewey Decimal: 813/.54 20
- LC Class: PS3557.R5355 P4 1992

The Pelican Brief is a legal-suspense thriller by John Grisham, published in 1992 by Doubleday. It is his third novel after A Time to Kill and The Firm. Two paperback editions were published, both by Dell Publishing in 1993. A namesake film adaptation was released in 1993 starring Julia Roberts and Denzel Washington.

== Plot ==
The story begins with the assassinations of two ideologically divergent Supreme Court justices. Both murders are committed by Khamel, the most wanted hitman in the world. Justice Rosenberg, a liberal, is killed at his home while Justice Jensen, a Republican-appointed swing voter, is killed inside a gay movie theater in Washington, D.C. The circumstances surrounding their deaths, as well as the deaths themselves, shock and confuse a politically divided nation.

Darby Shaw, a Tulane University law student, conducts research on Rosenberg and Jensen's records and writes a legal brief speculating they were not killed for political reasons. She shows the brief to Thomas Callahan, her law professor and lover, who in turn shows it to his friend, an FBI lawyer, Gavin Verheek. Soon afterwards, Callahan is killed by a car bomb, while Shaw, who witnesses his death, is contacted at the scene by suspicious people. Afraid that she is the next target, Shaw goes on the run. She contacts and agrees to meet Verheek, but Khamel murders Verheek and impersonates him when they meet. He is just about to kill Shaw when he is shot by an unknown person, so she manages to escape again.

Gray Grantham, a reporter for The Washington Post, is contacted by an informant calling himself "Garcia", who believes he has seen something in his law office that is related to the assassinations. However, Garcia is reluctant to come forward. Shaw shows her findings to Grantham, believing that the assassinations were committed on behalf of Victor Mattiece, an oil tycoon who seeks to drill on Louisiana marshland which is home to an endangered species of pelican. A case that would decide whether Mattiece can gain access to the land is expected to be heard before the Supreme Court. Despite their status as ideological opposites, the two slain justices had a single characteristic in common: a history of environmentalism, causing Shaw to surmise that Mattiece orchestrated their murders to make sure their replacements would be appointed by the current president, a hardline reactionary. Grantham agrees to help Shaw prove her suspicion is correct.

The president and his Chief of Staff, Fletcher Coal, try to cover up the White House's link to Mattiece, afraid that it might endanger the president's re-election. The president orders FBI Director F. Denton Voyles to temporarily stop working on the brief, and asks the more trusted CIA Director Bob Gminski to conduct the investigation instead. They also send an agent to Mattiece to find out whether the brief is true, but Mattiece, who has become practically insane over the past several years, has the agent killed.

Shaw and Grantham manage to track down Curtis Morgan, a.k.a. "Garcia", an employee of the law firm representing Mattiece, only to find out that he died some days before in an apparent mugging. They manage to contact his widow, leading them to discover Morgan's written and videotaped testimony. Morgan reveals that, some time before the assassinations, he accidentally looked at an internal correspondence and realized that some of his co-workers were involved in the murders. Afraid that he himself might be killed, Morgan decided to record his testimony. With this evidence, Grantham and Shaw approach the Post's chief editor. Voyles appears at the newsroom and reveals that he has a tape recording of the conversation with the President ordering him to stop working on the brief, and that the CIA was investigating Mattiece and killed Khamel to save Shaw's life. He also arranges a plane for Shaw to disappear.

The story prominently appears in the Post, over the objections of the president and his staff. One of the implicated lawyers commits suicide. The President is expected to announce he will not seek re-election. Mattiece disappears. Shaw settles on an island in the Caribbean and is joined by Grantham, who agrees to stay for at least a month.

== Critical reception ==
Kirkus Reviews called the book a "gripping legal suspenser," writing that it "is a tale that baits its own hooks with the lures of All the President's Men." Entertainment Weekly wrote that "Grisham recycles the old formulas with sure pacing and considerable panache." Publishers Weekly wrote that the author "delivers a suspenseful plot at a breakneck pace, although his characters are stereotypes."

== See also ==
- Supreme Court of the United States in fiction
