= Steel Magnolias =

1989 American film by Herbert Ross

- Theatrical release poster
- Directed by: Herbert Ross
- Screenplay by: Robert Harling
- Based on: Steel Magnolias by Robert Harling
- Produced by: Ray Stark
- Starring: Sally Field; Dolly Parton; Shirley MacLaine; Daryl Hannah; Olympia Dukakis; Julia Roberts; Tom Skerritt; Dylan McDermott; Kevin J. O'Connor; Sam Shepard
- Cinematography: John A. Alonzo
- Edited by: Paul Hirsch
- Music by: Georges Delerue
- Production company: Rastar
- Distributed by: Tri-Star Pictures
- Release date: November 15, 1989
- Running time: 118 minutes
- Country: United States
- Language: English
- Budget: $15 million
- Box office: $96.8 million

Steel Magnolias is a 1989 American comedy drama film directed by Herbert Ross and starring Sally Field, Dolly Parton, Shirley MacLaine, Daryl Hannah, Olympia Dukakis, and Julia Roberts. The screenplay by Robert Harling is based on his 1987 play of the same name about the bond a group of women share in a small-town Southern community, and how they cope with the death of one of their own. The supporting cast features Tom Skerritt, Dylan McDermott, Kevin J. O'Connor, and Sam Shepard. Harling based the story in part on his sister, Susan Harling Robinson, who died in 1985 of complications from type 1 diabetes. In the film, Roberts plays Shelby, the character based on Susan.

The film was released by Tri-Star Pictures on November 15, 1989, and received mixed reviews from critics, who praised the humor and performances but criticized its portrayal of the South. Roberts, Field and MacLaine earned nominations for their performances: Roberts (who won Best Supporting Actress) and Field at the 47th Golden Globe Awards, and MacLaine at the 44th British Academy Film Awards. At the 62nd Academy Awards, Roberts earned a nomination for Best Supporting Actress (her career-first nomination).

== Plot ==
Annelle Dupuy, a shy beauty school graduate, moves to Chinquapin Parish in northwestern Louisiana, where Truvy Jones hires her to work in her home-based beauty salon.

Meanwhile, M'Lynn Eatenton, a good friend of Truvy's, and her daughter, Shelby, prepare for Shelby's wedding that is being held later that day. M'Lynn's husband, Drum Eatenton, fires a gun loaded with blanks to drive birds out of the trees so they do not interfere with the reception. Along with Clairee Belcher, the former mayor's cheerful widow, they arrive at Truvy's to have their hair done. While there, Shelby, who has type 1 diabetes, suffers a hypoglycemic attack but recovers quickly with the women's help. M'Lynn reveals that due to Shelby's medical condition, her doctor advises against her having children. Shelby considered ending her engagement to her fiancé, Jackson, so he will not be deprived of children.

Grouchy and sarcastic Louisa "Ouiser" Boudreaux arrives at the salon and begins interrogating Annelle about her background. Annelle tearfully reveals that her husband, who is evading the police, has disappeared after stealing her money, belongings, and car. She further admits that she is unsure her marriage is legal. Shelby invites Annelle to the wedding reception, where she meets bartender Sammy DeSoto.

By the time of the Christmas festival later that year, Clairee has bought local radio station KPPD. Shelby attempts to set Ouiser up with Owen Jenkins, an old flame, then at a holiday party announces she is pregnant. Everyone is thrilled except M'Lynn, who knows the risks. Truvy encourages M'Lynn to instead focus on the joy a baby brings.

Shelby has a boy and names him Jackson Latcherie Jr. Clairee relates how her brother has become estranged from her nephew after the nephew came out as gay, and Ouiser is seeing Owen but insists that they are only friends as her two deceased husbands were both very mean to her during their marriages. Annelle has become a devout, rather preachy Christian, much to Sammy's annoyance. Shelby and M'Lynn, to the horror of the other ladies, relate how the stress of pregnancy has caused Shelby's kidneys to shut down and she is now on dialysis, as shown by Shelby's needle-marked arm. M'Lynn will be donating a kidney to her daughter the next day.

Shelby recovers from the transplant, but four months later, Jackson arrives home to find her unconscious, having contracted an infection due to the suppressive therapy that keeps her body from rejecting the kidney. After the doctors determine that Shelby's condition is irreversible, the family decide to remove her from life support.

After breaking down in grief at Shelby's funeral, but later having a good laugh by Clairee's shenanigans at Ouiser's expense, M'Lynn gradually accepts her daughter's decision to have risked her life in return for a few years of motherhood and decides to focus her energy on helping Jackson with raising her grandson. Annelle, who married Sammy and is now pregnant, tells M'Lynn that she wants to name her baby after Shelby, even if the baby happens to be a boy, as she and Sammy met at Shelby's wedding reception. M’Lynn, touched, tells her Shelby would love that. Later, at the town's Easter egg hunt, Quiser comes with Owen as boyfriend and girlfrend and Annelle goes into labor and is rushed to the hospital by Truvy and her husband Spud in their truck, followed by Sammy in an Easter Bunny costume and Spud and Truvy's son Louie on Louie's motorcycle.

== Cast ==
- Sally Field as Mary Lynn "M'Lynn" Eatenton
- Dolly Parton as Truvy Jones
- Shirley MacLaine as Louisa "Ouiser" Boudreaux
- Daryl Hannah as Annelle Dupuy-DeSoto
- Olympia Dukakis as Clairee Belcher
- Julia Roberts as Shelby Eatenton-Latcherie
- Tom Skerritt as Drum Eatenton
- Sam Shepard as Spud Jones
- Dylan McDermott as Jackson Latcherie
- Kevin J. O'Connor as Sammy DeSoto
- Bill McCutcheon as Owen Jenkins
- Ann Wedgeworth as Fern Thornton
- Knowl Johnson as Tommy Eatenton
- Jonathan Ward as Jonathan Eatenton
- Bibi Besch as Belle Marmillion
- Janine Turner as Nancy Beth Marmillion
- James Wlcek as Marshall Marmillion
- Tom Hodges as Louie Jones

== Background ==
The original play dramatized experiences of the family and friends of the playwright following the 1985 death of his sister from diabetic complications after the birth of his namesake nephew and the failure of a family member's donated kidney. A writer friend continuously encouraged him to write it down in order to come to terms with the experience. He did but originally as a short story for his nephew then later to get an understanding of the deceased mother. It evolved in ten days into the play.

== Production ==
Harling's first produced screenplay, he adapted the original film script which was then heavily rewritten beyond the on-stage one-set scenario (which had taken place entirely in Truvy's beauty salon) of the stage production: the scenes increased and the sequence was more tightly linked with major holidays than the play; the increased characters beyond the original, all-female play cast caused dialogue changes between on-screen characters (among them, Harling plays the preacher and Truvy has one son instead of two).

Meg Ryan was initially cast as Shelby, but dropped out to make When Harry Met Sally; she was replaced by Julia Roberts.

Filming took place from July 12, 1988, to early September 1988 in Natchitoches, Louisiana, with historian Robert DeBlieux, a former Natchitoches mayor, as the local advisor. The house where much of the film was shot became a six-suite bed and breakfast, available for rent.

== Reception ==
=== Box office ===
Steel Magnolias grossed $84.6 million in the United States and Canada, and $12.1 million in other territories, for a worldwide total of $96.8 million.

In the United States and Canada, the film debuted at number four in its opening weekend, grossing $5.4 million from 480 theaters. The following weekend, it expanded to 720 theaters and grossed $7 million.

=== Critical response ===
Steel Magnolias received mixed reviews from critics upon release, although Roberts's performance was praised. On the review aggregator website Rotten Tomatoes, 73% of 81 critics' reviews are positive, with an average rating of 6.5/10. The website's consensus reads: "Steel Magnolias has jokes and characters to spare, which makes it more dangerous (and effective) when it goes for the full melodrama by the end." Metacritic, which uses a weighted average, assigned the film a score of 56 out of 100, based on 13 critics, indicating "mixed or average" reviews.

In a negative review, Hal Hinson of The Washington Post said that the film "runs on gags, pitched to the cheapest seats, and maudlin emotion, pitched to the cheapest sentiments. The script […] is on a degenerated line from Tennessee Williams by way of Hallmark cards." More enthusiastic was Roger Ebert of the Chicago Sun-Times, who said that the film was "willing to sacrifice its over-all impact for individual moments of humor, and while that leaves us without much to take home, you've got to hand it to them: The moments work".

=== Accolades ===
Award	Year	Category	Recipient	Result
Academy Awards	1989	Best Supporting Actress	Julia Roberts	Nominated
Golden Globe Awards	1989	Best Supporting Actress – Motion Picture	Julia Roberts	Won
Golden Globe Awards	1989	Best Actress – Motion Picture Drama	Sally Field	Nominated
British Academy Film Awards	1991	Best Actress in a Supporting Role	Shirley MacLaine	Nominated
Chicago Film Critics Association Awards	1990	Best Supporting Actress	Shirley MacLaine	Nominated
American Comedy Awards	1990	Funniest Supporting Actress in a Motion Picture	Shirley MacLaine	Nominated
American Comedy Awards	1990	Funniest Supporting Actress in a Motion Picture	Olympia Dukakis	Nominated
People's Choice Awards	1990	Favorite Dramatic Motion Picture	Steel Magnolias	Won (Note: Tied with Batman)

=== Home media ===
The film was released on VHS in June 1990, and on DVD in July 2000, allowing the film to gross a further $40 million. The film's overall gross was $135,904,091. The film was released on Blu-ray through the boutique label Twilight Time, in September 2012. A 30th anniversary Blu-ray was released in May 2019. In April 2024, the film was released on 4K Ultra-HD in honor of the 35th Anniversary.

== Other media ==
=== Television pilot ===
CBS aired a half-hour television pilot sitcom on August 17, 1990. The pilot, set after the events of the film, featured the same characters, except for Shelby. The cast included Cindy Williams as M'Lynn, Sally Kirkland as Truvy, Elaine Stritch as Ouiser, Polly Bergen as Clairee, and Sheila McCarthy as Annelle. It was not picked up to series.

=== Lifetime remake ===
An all-black remake of Steel Magnolias premiered on Lifetime on October 7, 2012, directed by Kenny Leon, and featuring Queen Latifah (M'Lynn), Jill Scott (Truvy), Alfre Woodard (Ouiser), Phylicia Rashad (Clairee), Adepero Oduye (Annelle), and Condola Rashad (Shelby).

== See also ==
- List of films featuring diabetes
- Isle Brevelle
