= The Pelican Brief (film) =

1993 film by Alan J. Pakula

- Theatrical release poster
- Directed by: Alan J. Pakula
- Screenplay by: Alan J. Pakula
- Based on: The Pelican Brief by John Grisham
- Produced by: Alan J. Pakula; Pieter Jan Brugge; Bryan D. Gilchrist
- Starring: Julia Roberts; Denzel Washington; Sam Shepard; John Heard; Tony Goldwyn; James B. Sikking; William Atherton; Robert Culp; Stanley Tucci; Hume Cronyn; John Lithgow
- Cinematography: Stephen Goldblatt
- Edited by: Tom Rolf; Trudy Ship
- Music by: James Horner
- Production company: Warner Bros.
- Distributed by: Warner Bros.
- Release date: December 17, 1993
- Running time: 141 minutes
- Country: United States
- Language: English
- Budget: $45 million
- Box office: $195 million

The Pelican Brief is a 1993 American legal thriller film based on John Grisham's 1992 novel. Written and directed by Alan J. Pakula, the film stars Julia Roberts in the role of young law student Darby Shaw and Denzel Washington as Washington Herald reporter Gray Grantham. It was the final film produced and written by Pakula.

The Pelican Brief was released by Warner Bros. on December 17, 1993. The film received mixed reviews from critics and grossed $195 million against a $45 million budget.

== Plot ==
An assassin, Khamel, kills two Supreme Court justices, Jensen and Rosenberg. Tulane University law student Darby Shaw writes a legal brief detailing a motive for the murders. Her law professor and lover Thomas Callahan, a former clerk of Rosenberg's, reads the brief and gives a copy to Gavin Verheek, special counsel to the director of the FBI. Soon after, Callahan is killed in a car explosion, which Darby barely escapes safely. Realizing her brief must be accurate, she goes into hiding and reaches out to Verheek.

An informant calling himself Garcia contacts Washington Herald reporter Gray Grantham regarding the assassinations but disappears. Darby also contacts Grantham. Meanwhile, Darby's friend says that Darby's computer, disks, and files have disappeared from her home.

Darby is attacked at her hotel hideout but escapes. She and Verheek arrange to meet, but Khamel kills then impersonates him at the meeting. Before he can kill Darby, an unknown hitman fatally shoots him in a public square.

Darby meets Grantham in NYC and shares the theory expressed in her brief: the assassinations were done for oil tycoon Victor Mattiece. He intends to drill the oil found beneath a Louisiana marshland that is habitat for an endangered sub-species of brown pelicans.

A court appeal to deny Mattiece the drilling rights is expected to reach the Supreme Court. Darby surmised that he, hoping to turn the case in his favor, is behind the two justices' murders, as they shared similar environment protection views. As a generous donor to the president, Mattiece expects him to appoint justices favoring oil and gas exploitation over environmental issues while the next president may not.

Grantham's informant 'Garcia' is actually Curtis Morgan, a lawyer in the oil and gas division at a Washington, D.C. law firm. Darby pretends to have an appointment with him but inadvertently learns he was recently killed in a 'mugging'. Suspecting his murder was related to the incriminating information, she and Grantham visit his widow. She gives them a key to a safe deposit box, so Darby retrieves its contents.

After barely escaping a car bomb, and being chased through a city parking garage while under fire, the two arrive at the Washington Herald. They and Grantham's editors review the document video tape found in the box. The tape corroborates Darby's theory, and Morgan's documents verify that Mattiece ordered the justices' assassinations. Based on this evidence, Grantham writes his story.

FBI Director Denton Voyles confirms to Grantham that Darby's "Pelican Brief" was delivered to the White House. He reveals the president requested the FBI "back off" and that the CIA is investigating Mattiece. The FBI flies Darby to a safe location under the United States Federal Witness Protection Program.

Sometime later, Darby watches a TV interview with Grantham that reveals Mattiece, four aides and lawyers have been indicted, and the president's chief of staff Fletcher Coal has resigned. The president (who received $4.2 million in contributions from Mattiece) is unlikely to run for reelection. Grantham deflects speculation that Darby is fictional but agrees she is "almost" too good to be true, causing Darby to smile.

== Cast ==
- Julia Roberts as Darby Shaw
- Denzel Washington as Gray Grantham
- Sam Shepard as Thomas Callahan
- John Heard as Gavin Verheek
- Tony Goldwyn as Fletcher Coal
- James B. Sikking as FBI Director Denton Voyles
- John Finn as Matthew Barr
- William Atherton as Bob Gminski
- Robert Culp as The President
- Stanley Tucci as Khamel
- Hume Cronyn as Justice Rosenberg
- John Lithgow as Smith Keen
- Anthony Heald as Marty Velmano
- Nicholas Woodeson as Stump
- Cynthia Nixon as Alice Stark
- Jake Weber as Curtis Morgan / Garcia
- Ralph Cosham as Justice Jensen
- Casey Biggs as Eric East
- Stanley Anderson as Edwin Sneller
- Christopher Murray as Rupert
- Edwin Newman as Himself

== Production ==
In October 1991, Daily Variety announced Alan J. Pakula's involvement in writing, directing, and producing a film adaptation of John Grisham's novel The Pelican Brief. Carolco Pictures, with whom Pakula had a first-look agreement, secured the film rights for $1.3 million. Initial plans outlined John Grisham drafting the first script iteration while Pakula was in pre-production for Consenting Adults (1992). However, financial troubles at Carolco led to Pakula's departure from the company, resulting in an early termination of his contract and the transfer of The Pelican Brief project to him. Subsequently, Pakula struck a two-year deal with Warner Bros. Pictures, which paid $1.75 million to option the film rights.

Julia Roberts ended a yearlong hiatus from acting by signing on to portray Darby Shaw, undergoing preparation by attending law classes at Tulane University in New Orleans, where filming commenced on May 21, 1993. Tony Goldwyn campaigned for the role of Fletcher Coal, convincing Pakula he could portray a younger version of the character than depicted in the novel. Goldwyn consulted with White House advisor George Stephanopoulos to prepare for the role.

Filming locations in New Orleans included an apartment in the French Quarter, doubling as Thomas Callahan's residence, Antoine's restaurant on St. Louis Avenue, Bourbon Street for a crowd scene featuring over 1,000 extras, and the warehouse district for Thomas Callahan's car explosion. Production shifted to Washington, D.C., on June 20, 1993, with scenes shot at various locations including the Supreme Court steps, Georgetown University Law Center, FBI's J. Edgar Hoover Building courtyard, and Washington International School portraying Parklane Hospital. The National Cathedral, Howrey & Simon law offices, and Citadel Soundstage were also used for filming.

Pakula and Warner Bros. opted to film an additional, more upbeat ending, leading to extra shooting in Montecito, California, on November 27, 1993, extending the runtime by approximately ninety seconds. A private screening at the White House, hosted by President Bill Clinton and First Lady Hillary Clinton, was held on December 10, 1993, a week before the film's theatrical release, attended by Grisham and Pakula.

== Reception ==
=== Box office ===
The Pelican Brief grossed $100 million in the United States and Canada, and $95 million in other territories, for a worldwide total of $195 million, against a production budget of $45 million.

=== Critical response ===
On Rotten Tomatoes, the film has an approval rating of 55% based on 55 reviews, with an average rating of 5.6/10. The site's consensus states: "Julia Roberts and Denzel Washington are a compelling team in the overlong Pelican Brief, a pulpy thriller that doesn't quite justify the intellectual remove of Alan J. Pakula's direction." On Metacritic, the film has a weighted average score of 50 out of 100, based on 15 critics, indicating "mixed or average reviews". Audiences polled by CinemaScore gave the film an average grade of "B+" on an A+ to F scale.

Pat Collins, from WWOR-TV, said that the film was "A heart-stopping, spine-chilling, adrenaline-pumping, run-for-your-life thriller." In The Chicago Sun-Times, Roger Ebert gave it 3 out of a possible 4 stars, writing "the movie delivers while it's onscreen" but also believed The Pelican Brief was inferior to the film adaptation of Grisham's The Firm (also 1993) and ranked as one of Pakula's lesser efforts. Brian Lowry of Variety wrote: "Pakula does a remarkable job in weaving and making sense of these complex strands. Although there's plenty of suspense as Darby and Gray evade her pursuers, the director eschews the cheaper tricks of the trade, respecting the audience's ability to keep track of what's going on. Also, Brief is a relatively gore-free thriller, with most of the violence effectively conveyed offscreen."

Janet Maslin of The New York Times wrote: "The Pelican Brief is best watched as a celebration of liquid brown eyes and serious star quality, thanks to the casting of Ms. Roberts and Denzel Washington in its leading roles. Neither of these first-rate actors is shown to great dramatic advantage, but they both do a lot to make the movie shine."

== Home media ==
The Pelican Brief was released on VHS on June 15, 1994, by Warner Home Video. The film was released on DVD on June 24, 1997, by Warner Home Video. The film was released on Blu-ray on February 10, 2009, by Warner Home Video.

A triple feature Blu-ray pack with The Pelican Brief, John Q., and Training Day was released on May 1, 2012.
