= Duplicity (2009 film) =

2009 film by Tony Gilroy

- Theatrical release poster
- Directed by: Tony Gilroy
- Written by: Tony Gilroy
- Produced by: Jennifer Fox; Laura Bickford
- Starring: Julia Roberts; Clive Owen; Tom Wilkinson; Paul Giamatti
- Cinematography: Robert Elswit
- Edited by: John Gilroy
- Music by: James Newton Howard
- Production company: Relativity Media
- Distributed by: Universal Pictures
- Release dates: March 10, 2009 (London); March 20, 2009 (United States)
- Running time: 125 minutes
- Country: United States
- Language: English
- Budget: $60 million
- Box office: $78.1 million

Duplicity is a 2009 American romantic crime comedy film written and directed by Tony Gilroy, and starring Julia Roberts and Clive Owen. The non-linear narrative follows two corporate spies with a romantic history who collaborate to carry out a complicated con. The film was released on March 20, 2009.

== Plot ==
Ray Koval, an MI6 agent, meets Claire Stenwick, a CIA officer, at a party in Dubai. Unaware of her identity, he attempts to seduce her, but she drugs him and steals his classified documents.

Three years later, Ray confronts Claire in Rome, giving in to their mutual attraction and spending several days together at a posh hotel. Though wary of one another, they consider joining forces to enrich themselves through corporate espionage. Exploring possibilities over several months, they leave their careers as government spies to carry out their plan in the private sector.

Ray suggests exploiting the frozen pizza market, but Claire accepts a counterintelligence job in New York City with consumer goods giant Equikrom, who install her as a double agent with their chief competitor, Burkett & Randle. After being embedded for over a year, Claire arranges for Ray to join the Equikrom team as her handler.

Unbeknownst to them, Burkett & Randle have infiltrated the Equikrom team and are spying on Claire and Ray, overhearing them rehearse their plan. Burkett & Randle's CEO, Howard Tully, decides to manipulate the pair in his rivalry with Equikrom's CEO, Dick Garsik. As rehearsed, Claire and Ray pretend to meet acrimoniously for the first time since Dubai — reprising much of their Rome confrontation — to avoid suspicion about their clandestine partnership.

Tully's operatives plant misinformation for Garsik's team to find, including a speech Tully makes to his own team about an unknown but groundbreaking new product. Garsik's team go to extreme lengths to uncover the mystery product, even hacking Burkett & Randle's photocopiers, and Claire is upset when Ray seduces an employee of the company's travel office to gather information.

Garsik's team are led to believe Tully has acquired a lucrative scientific breakthrough, funding a life of luxury for the product's inventor at a Bahamas resort. Claire is forced to help Tully's team thwart Ray, but as thanks for her apparent loyalty, Tully reveals the breakthrough product: a cure for baldness. Claire informs Garsik, who expects his team to obtain the cure in time for Equikrom's shareholders meeting, before Burkett & Randle can announce the discovery.

Despite their romantic connection, Claire continues to test Ray's commitment to her and to their plan, and neither is entirely free of the other's suspicion. After catching each other dipping into their emergency stash of passports and cash, they agree to part ways once their scheme is complete.

When one of Tully's operatives is caught trying to steal the cure's chemical formula, Claire seizes the opportunity to send the formula to Ray and Garsik's team via the hacked copy equipment, unaware the "theft" was staged. As the Equikrom team celebrate their victory, Claire executes her exit strategy, storming off after exposing Ray for hiding his own copy of the formula.

In Las Vegas, Garsik tells his shareholders that Equikrom is developing a product that cures baldness, while Claire and Ray meet at Zürich Airport. They finally admit they are in love, and have each secured a copy of the formula, which they arrange to sell to a Swiss company for $35 million. However, the Swiss reveal the formula is merely for an ordinary lotion — the final stroke of Tully's plot to dupe Garsik. Emptyhanded but impressed by how thoroughly they were manipulated, Claire and Ray now have only each other, and a thank you bottle of champagne from Tully.

== Cast ==
- Julia Roberts as Claire Stenwick
- Clive Owen as Ray Koval
- Tom Wilkinson as Howard Tully
- Paul Giamatti as Richard "Dick" Garsik
- Denis O'Hare as Duke Monahan
- Kathleen Chalfant as Pam Fraile
- Thomas McCarthy as Jeff Bauer
- Wayne Duvall as Ned Guston
- Carrie Preston as Barbara Bofferd
- Christopher Denham as Ronny Partiz
- Oleg Shtefanko as Boris Fetyov (as Oleg Stefan)
- Happy Anderson as Physec
- Rick Worthy as Dale Raimes

== Production ==
Production on Duplicity began in New York City on March 9, 2008, and wrapped shooting on May 27 of that year. Filming locations included Paradise Island in the Bahamas for the casino shots, New York City including the West Village, Trafalgar Square in London and outside the Pantheon in Rome.

== Release ==
The film was released on March 19, 2009, in Australia and on March 20 in the US and the UK. It had its world premiere on March 11, 2009, at London's Leicester Square.

== Reception ==
The film received mixed to positive reviews from film critics. As of October 2021, the film holds a 65% approval rating on Rotten Tomatoes, based on 192 reviews with an average rating of 6.40/10. The website's critics consensus reads: "Duplicity is well-crafted, smart, and often funny, but it's mostly more cerebral than visceral and features far too many plot twists." On Metacritic, the film has a score of 69 out of 100 based on reviews from 34 critics, indicating "generally favorable" reviews. Audiences polled by CinemaScore gave the film an average grade of "C" on an A+ to F scale.

Film critic Roger Ebert gave the film three out of four stars and wrote, "Duplicity is entertaining, but the complexities of its plot keep it from being really involving: When nothing is as it seems, why care?", but admitted that "the fun is in watching Roberts and Owen fencing with dialogue, keeping straight faces, trying to read each other's minds".

In his review for The New York Observer, Andrew Sarris wrote, "So what has gone wrong with Duplicity? I can only go with my gut feeling: that Mr. Gilroy has outsmarted himself by pulling too many switches in his narrative. He then fails to recover by coming up with a smash ending that pulls all the scattered pieces together". Scott Foundas, in his review for the Village Voice, wrote, "Comedy seems to have liberated Gilroy, who directs Duplicity with the high gloss and fleet-footed hustle of a golden-age Hollywood craftsman. There's nary a dull stretch in its two-hour breadth".

Entertainment Weekly gave the film a "B" rating; Lisa Schwarzbaum wrote, "Gilroy counts on a Thin Man-style undercurrent of sexual sparring to sustain our interest in two scheming corporate operatives despite the fact that nothing much else is going on".

In his review for The New York Times, A. O. Scott praised Julia Roberts' performance: "Ms. Roberts has almost entirely left behind the coltish, America's-sweetheart mannerisms, except when she uses them strategically, to disarm or confuse. Curvier than she used to be and with a touch of weariness around her eyes and impatience in her voice, she is, at 41, unmistakably in her prime".

However, not all reviews were positive. Sukhdev Sandhu, in his review for The Daily Telegraph, wrote, "Duplicity is really all about Roberts and Owen. They're con artists, but they don't fool us. Their pairing here feels duplicitous. Gilroy, it seems, is better at thrilling audiences than he is at seducing them". Peter Travers of Rolling Stone gave the film two and a half stars out of four and said "Gilroy and his stars make it elegant fun to be fooled, but they sure as hell make you work for it."

Filmmaker and author Peter Bogdanovich cited Duplicity as an example of a recent Hollywood film that has a pretentious style of filmmaking as compared with the organic artistic approach of Orson Welles to cinema, highlighting its non-chronological presentation of events as unnecessary and stating, "... and they wonder why the audience said 'What the fuck is going on?'"

== Accolades ==
Awards
| Award | Category | Recipient(s) | Outcome |
|---|---|---|---|
| Golden Globe Awards | Best Actress, Musical/Comedy | Julia Roberts | Nominated |

== Home media ==
The film was released on DVD and Blu-ray Disc on August 25, 2009. Mill Creek Entertainment re-released the Blu-ray on September 17, 2019.
