= Mystic Pizza =

1988 film by Donald Petrie

- Theatrical release poster
- Directed by: Donald Petrie
- Screenplay by: Amy Holden Jones; Perry Howze; Randy Howze; Alfred Uhry
- Story by: Amy Holden Jones
- Produced by: Mark Levinson; Scott Rosenfelt
- Starring: Annabeth Gish; Julia Roberts; Lili Taylor; Vincent Phillip D'Onofrio; William R. Moses; Adam Storke
- Cinematography: Tim Suhrstedt
- Edited by: Don Brochu; Marion Rothman
- Music by: David McHugh
- Distributed by: The Samuel Goldwyn Company
- Release dates: October 18, 1988 (Mystic); October 21, 1988 (United States)
- Running time: 104 minutes
- Country: United States
- Language: English
- Budget: $6 million
- Box office: $14 million

Mystic Pizza is a 1988 American romantic comedy-drama film directed by Donald Petrie in his feature directorial debut, set in the coastal town of Mystic, Connecticut, and starring Annabeth Gish, Julia Roberts, and Lili Taylor.

The plot follows the coming-of-age of three young Portuguese-American waitresses at the titular pizza parlor.

The film received positive reviews, with Roger Ebert writing, "I have a feeling that Mystic Pizza may someday become known for the movie stars it showcased back before they became stars. All of the young actors in this movie have genuine gifts." It also marked Matt Damon's film debut.

== Plot ==
Sisters Kat and Daisy Araújo, and their friend Josephina "JoJo" Barboza, are young Portuguese-American women working as waitresses at Mystic Pizza, a pizza parlor owned by Leona and her husband Vic in the fishing town of Mystic, Connecticut.

JoJo is engaged to Bill but faints at their wedding because she has reservations. The weight of responsibility of marriage and family hits her all at once and she is overcome. JoJo wants to continue having a relationship with Bill until she is ready to be married. She loves her physical relationship with him, but he wants more. Bill breaks up with JoJo because she will not commit, although it is clear they both love each other.

Kat and Daisy are opposites. Kat, the younger sister, is an aspiring astronomer. She has been accepted to Yale University on a partial scholarship and, in addition to waitressing at Mystic Pizza and babysitting, is working at the Mystic Seaport Whaling Museum‘s planetarium. In contrast, glamorous Daisy's goal is to have as much fun as possible.

Daisy meets Charles, a rich young man she had her eye on, at a bar. The two begin a relationship, much to her mother's dismay. At a family dinner, Charles's relatives make insensitive comments about Daisy's Portuguese ethnicity, and Charles overreacts. Daisy breaks up with him, accusing him of using her to rebel against his parents.

Kat becomes infatuated with Tim, an architect and Yale graduate who has hired her to babysit his four-year-old daughter Phoebe while his wife works in England. A relationship develops between them, and they sleep together.

Tensions rise between the two sisters: Kat criticizes Daisy for being promiscuous, which Daisy resents, since Kat is having an affair with a married man. However, when Tim’s wife Nicki returns, Tim rejects Kat. Daisy consoles her sister, and they reconcile.

A television food critic known as "The Fireside Gourmet" unexpectedly visits Mystic Pizza. He takes a few bites of one pizza slice, jots notes, pays, and leaves. His approval can do wonders for a restaurant, but they are not optimistic.

A few days later, Tim brings Phoebe to Mystic Pizza because she wants to say goodbye to Kat, as her family is leaving town. Tim gives Kat a check to help cover her tuition expenses, but she tears it up just as Fireside Gourmet’s latest show airs and he gives the restaurant his highest rating.

JoJo marries Bill, Kat accepts a loan from Leona, and Daisy and Charlie reconcile at the wedding. The film ends with the three women overlooking the water from the restaurant's balcony, reminiscing about their time together and wondering about the future.

== Cast ==
- Annabeth Gish as Katherine "Kat" Araújo
- Julia Roberts as Daisy Araújo
- Lili Taylor as Josephina "JoJo" Barboza
- Vincent D'Onofrio as William "Bill" Montijo
- William R. Moses as Tim Travers
- Adam Storke as Charles Gordon Windsor Jr.
- Conchata Ferrell as Leona
- Joanna Merlin as Mrs. Araújo
- Porscha Radcliffe as Phoebe Travers
- Louis Turenne as Hector 'The Fireside Gourmet' Freshette
- Janet Zarish as Nikki Travers
- Arthur Walsh as Manny
- John Cunningham as Charles Gordon Windsor Sr.
- Ann Flood as Polly Windsor
- Suzanne Shepherd as Aunt Tweedy
- Gene Amoroso as Mr. Barboza
- Sheila Ferrini as Mrs. Barboza
- John Fiore as Jake
- Lauren O'Brien as Serena Windsor
- Matt Damon as Steamer Windsor
- Jack Ringstad as Uncle Ned
- Jody Raymond as Teresa
- Dennis Paiva as himself (Portuguese-American wedding singer)

== Production and filming locations ==
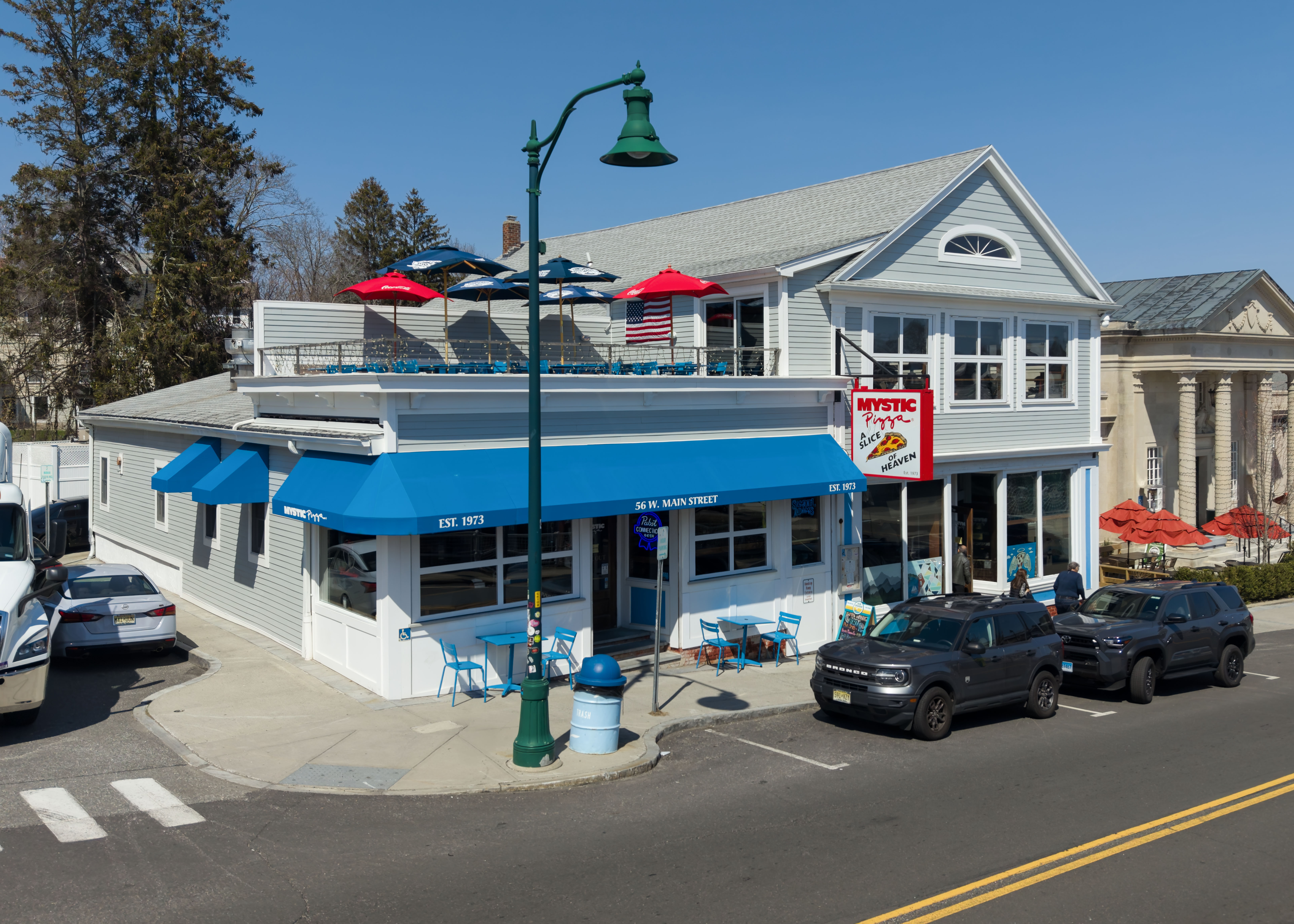
The Mystic Pizza restaurant in downtown Mystic

The title of the film was inspired by a pizza shop in Mystic, Connecticut. Screenwriter Amy Holden Jones was summering in the area and chose Mystic Pizza as the focus of her story about the lives of three young waitresses.

Jones was set to direct but was replaced by Petrie, who made his feature film directorial debut. The film was also Alfred Uhry's screenwriting debut.

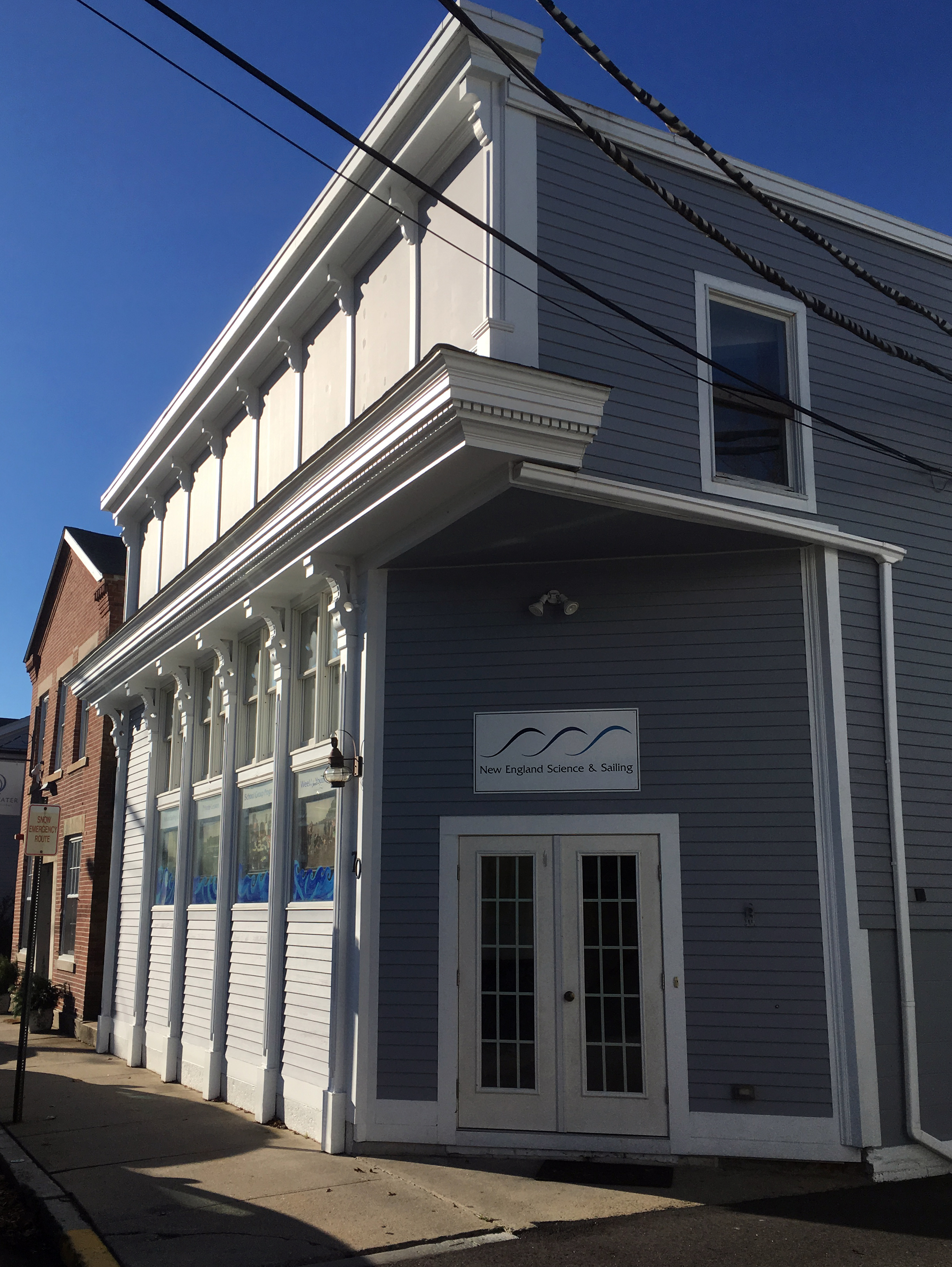
70 Water Street in Stonington. Filming location for the Mystic Pizza restaurant

The filming began October 12, 1987, and was due to last six weeks. The film's plot is set in Mystic, but most of the filming locations were in neighboring towns. The building used for the pizza restaurant was a converted home in Stonington Borough at 70 Water St. After the film's release, the real-life Mystic Pizza building in downtown Mystic was renovated to resemble the film set. The Windsor family home, the wedding reception restaurant, the Peg Leg Pub pool hall, and the fishing docks were also filmed in Stonington Borough. The hitchhiking incident takes place on North Main Street in Stonington Town. The Araújo home is in Pawcatuck, Connecticut; the lobster business and the wedding church are in Noank, Connecticut. Tim Travers' home and the Windsors' country club are in Watch Hill, Rhode Island. The most notable scenes that take place in Mystic were filmed at the Mystic Seaport planetarium and at the Mystic River Bascule Bridge.

== Release ==
Goldwyn spent a company-record $6.5 million on prints, advertising, and other marketing activities, including tie-ins with Domino's Pizza and others. The film had 100 pre-opening screenings and premiered in Mystic, Connecticut on October 18, 1988. It was released on October 21, 1988 on 401 screens in 40 cities. It was planned to have a phased wide release, eventually rolling out to 1,100 screens but its mediocre opening and performance meant that it did not expand further.

== Reception ==
Upon release, the film received mixed reviews, which praised the performances by the three lead actresses. It received "two thumbs up" from popular film critics Siskel and Ebert, giving particular praise to the three female leads, including Gish, whom Ebert likened to a "young Katharine Hepburn". Daws. of Variety called it "a deftly told coming-of-age story about three young femmes as they explore their different destinies, mostly through romance, it's genuine and moving, with enough edge to impress contemporary audiences."

On Rotten Tomatoes, the film has a score of 78% based on reviews from 27 critics. The website's critics consensus reads: "Mystic Pizza is like its namesake food: it's cheesy, topped with romance, and rises to the occasion." Metacritic, which uses a weighted average, assigned the film a score of 59 out of 100, based on 10 critics, indicating "mixed or average" reviews.

== Home media ==
On January 13, 2009, Mystic Pizza and Say Anything... were released as a double feature on DVD. On April 5, 2011, Mystic Pizza was released on Blu-ray.

== Stage musical adaptation ==
On January 22, 2019, it was announced that Mystic Pizza would be adapted into a stage musical. Melissa Etheridge would write the score, while Gordon Greenberg would direct and co-write the book with Sas Goldberg. This came years after a fictional Broadway musical adaptation of the film had served as a plot point in the early part of season 2 of the NBC sitcom 30 Rock in 2007.

The world premiere of the musical version of Mystic Pizza was produced by Ogunquit Playhouse in Ogunquit, Maine from September 1, 2021, through October 2, 2021. The production, which featured songs by Melissa Etheridge and other pop songs of the 1980s, starred Krystina Alabado as Daisy, Gianna Yanelli as Jojo, and Kyra Kennedy as Kat. The production was directed by Casey Hushion and featured a book by Sandy Rustin, choreography by Liz Ramos, and musical supervision by Carmel Dean, with Kristin Stowell as music director. Executive producers were Michael Barra and Allison Bressi of Lively McCabe Entertainment.

In 2025, the production directed by Hushion played at the Paper Mill Playhouse with a majority of the same cast from Ogunquit.

== See also ==
- Little Italy, a 2018 film, also directed by Donald Petrie and set in a pizza parlor
- Townies, a 1996 sitcom with a similar premise
