= August: Osage County (film) =

2013 American drama film directed by John Wells

- Theatrical release poster
- Directed by: John Wells
- Screenplay by: Tracy Letts
- Based on: August: Osage County by Tracy Letts
- Produced by: George Clooney; Grant Heslov; Jean Doumanian; Steve Traxler
- Starring: Meryl Streep; Julia Roberts; Ewan McGregor; Chris Cooper; Abigail Breslin; Benedict Cumberbatch; Juliette Lewis; Margo Martindale; Dermot Mulroney; Julianne Nicholson; Sam Shepard; Misty Upham
- Cinematography: Adriano Goldman
- Edited by: Stephen Mirrione
- Music by: Gustavo Santaolalla
- Production companies: Jean Doumanian Productions; Smoke House Pictures; Battle Mountain Films; Yucaipa Films
- Distributed by: The Weinstein Company
- Release dates: September 9, 2013 (TIFF); December 27, 2013 (United States)
- Running time: 120 minutes
- Country: United States
- Language: English
- Budget: $37 million
- Box office: $74.2 million

August: Osage County is a 2013 American tragicomedy film directed by John Wells and adapted by Tracy Letts from his 2007 play. The film was produced by George Clooney, Grant Heslov, Jean Doumanian, and Steve Traxler.

The film stars an ensemble cast consisting of Meryl Streep, Julia Roberts, Ewan McGregor, Chris Cooper, Abigail Breslin, Benedict Cumberbatch, Juliette Lewis, Margo Martindale, Dermot Mulroney, Julianne Nicholson, and Misty Upham as a dysfunctional family that reunites at the family home when their patriarch (Sam Shepard) suddenly disappears.

August: Osage County premiered at the Toronto International Film Festival on September 9, 2013, and was released in North America on December 27, 2013, by the Weinstein Company. A modest commercial success, the film received mixed-to-positive reviews from critics. While much praise was given to the cast, the screenplay was praised by some and seen by others as too dark and lacking in humor. For their performances in the film, Streep and Roberts received Oscar nominations for Best Actress and Best Supporting Actress, respectively.

== Plot ==
The title designates time and location: an unusually hot August in a rural area outside Pawhuska, Oklahoma, 60 miles northwest of Tulsa. Beverly Weston, an alcoholic, once-noted poet, teacher and author, interviews and hires a young Cheyenne woman, Johnna, as a live-in cook and caregiver for his strong-willed and contentious wife Violet, who has oral cancer and an addiction to narcotics. Shortly after this, he disappears from the house, and Violet calls her sister and daughters for support. Her sister Mattie Fae arrives with her husband Charles "Charlie" Aiken. Violet's middle daughter Ivy is single and the only one living locally; Barbara, her oldest, who has inherited her mother's mean streak, arrives from Colorado with her husband Bill and 14-year-old daughter Jean. Barbara and Bill are separated, but they put up a united front for Violet.

After five days, the sheriff arrives with the news that Beverly took his boat out on the lake and has drowned. Youngest daughter Karen arrives with the latest in a string of boyfriends, Steve Huberbrecht, a sleazy Florida businessman whom she introduces as her fiancé. Mattie Fae and Charles's 37-year-old awkward son "Little Charles" misses the funeral because he overslept and is met at the bus station by his father. Charlie loves his son, whereas Mattie Fae constantly belittles him. Ivy confides to her sisters that she is in love with Little Charles, her cousin, who plans to move to New York, and that she cannot have children because she had a hysterectomy. She feels this is her only chance to finally marry.

The family sits down to dinner after the funeral; fueled by drugs, Violet insults and embarrasses each person at the table under the guise of "truth-telling", which results in Barbara pouncing on her in a fit of anger. Barbara has had enough of her mother's drug addiction, attacks her, knocks her to the ground, and confiscates her multitude of pills. Later, after Violet has had a chance to sober up, she has a tender moment with her daughters and shares a story that demonstrates how cruel her own mother was when she longed for a new pair of cowgirl boots when she was in her early teens. Instead of giving Violet the boots she wanted, her mother gave her a beautifully wrapped box on Christmas morning containing old, filthy men's work boots as a cruel prank.

The next day, when Little Charles sings Ivy a song he has written for her, Mattie Fae walks in and berates him. This exhausts Charlie's patience with his wife's lack of love and compassion for her own son, and he threatens to leave her if she keeps it up. Mattie Fae subsequently reveals to Barbara, who unintentionally listened in, that long ago she had an affair with Beverly, and Little Charles is in fact their younger half-brother as well as their cousin and that is the true reason why he and Ivy cannot be together.

That evening, Steve and Jean are sharing a joint. Steve comes on to Jean, gets her stoned, asks her to show him her breasts, and starts to assault her. Johnna is woken by their conversation, sees this, and attacks him with a shovel. The commotion wakes up Barbara, Bill, and Karen who rush outside. Barbara confronts Jean and slaps her. This compels Bill to take Jean back to Colorado, leaving Barbara. Karen refuses to admit that her relationship is doomed and also leaves with Steve.

Later, Ivy tries to tell her mother about her relationship with Little Charles. Barbara tries to deflect the admission to protect Ivy from the truth. Violet tells Ivy that Charles is actually her brother, something Violet knew all along. Devastated, Ivy leaves and promises to never come back. In the last confrontation between Violet and Barbara, Violet admits she was contacted by Beverly from his motel the week after he had left home but did nothing to help him until after she removed money from the couple's joint safe deposit box. By that time, he had already killed himself. This revelation leads Barbara to depart, realizing that her mother is far beyond help. Violet is left with only Johnna. Violet begins dancing to loud music but quickly becomes too upset and goes off to find Johnna for comfort.

Barbara, driving through the plains, pulls off the road, gets out of her pickup, and cries. She then gets back in the truck and continues west, following signage showing highways and number of miles to Wichita, Salina, and Denver.

== Cast ==
- Meryl Streep as Violet Weston, the family matriarch who has cancer; Beverly's wife; Mattie Fae's sister; Barbara, Ivy, and Karen's mother; and Jean's grandmother
- Julia Roberts as Barbara Weston-Fordham, Violet and Beverly's oldest daughter, Mattie Fae and Charles' niece, Ivy and Karen's older sister and Jean's mother
- Ewan McGregor as Bill Fordham, Barbara's estranged husband and Jean's father
- Chris Cooper as Charles Aiken Sr., Mattie Fae's husband, Barbara, Karen and Ivy's uncle and Charles Jr.'s father
- Abigail Breslin as Jean Fordham, Barbara and Bill's teen daughter, Ivy and Karen's niece
- Benedict Cumberbatch as Charles "Little Charles" Aiken Jr., Charles and Mattie Fae's son
- Juliette Lewis as Karen Weston, Violet and Beverly's youngest daughter, Mattie Fae and Charles' niece, Barbara and Ivy's younger sister and Jean's aunt
- Margo Martindale as Mattie Fae Aiken, Violet's younger sister and Barbara, Karen and Ivy's aunt, Charles Sr.'s wife and Charles Jr.'s mother
- Dermot Mulroney as Steve Huberbrecht, Karen's fiancé
- Julianne Nicholson as Ivy Weston, Violet and Beverly's second daughter, Mattie Fae and Charles' niece, Barbara and Karen's middle sister and Jean's aunt
- Sam Shepard as Beverly Weston, the family patriarch, Barbara, Ivy and Karen's father, Violet's husband and Jean's grandfather
- Misty Upham as Johnna Monevata, a young Native American hired by Beverly to help Violet in their daily life

== Production ==
John Wells directed, while George Clooney, Grant Heslov, Jean Doumanian, and Steve Traxler produced the film. Renée Zellweger and Andrea Riseborough were considered to play Karen. Riseborough was cast but withdrew due to scheduling conflicts. Juliette Lewis replaced her. Chloë Grace Moretz also auditioned for the role of Jean.

Principal photography took place between October 16 and December 8, 2012, in Bartlesville and Pawhuska, Oklahoma, and Los Angeles.

== Release ==
August: Osage County premiered at the 2013 Toronto International Film Festival on September 9, 2013, before its release in select cities on December 27, 2013, followed by a wide release on January 10, 2014, in the United States. It was also released on January 1, 2014, in Australia. In its limited box-office debut, the film grossed $179,475 from five theaters, a $35,895 per-screen average.

=== Critical response ===
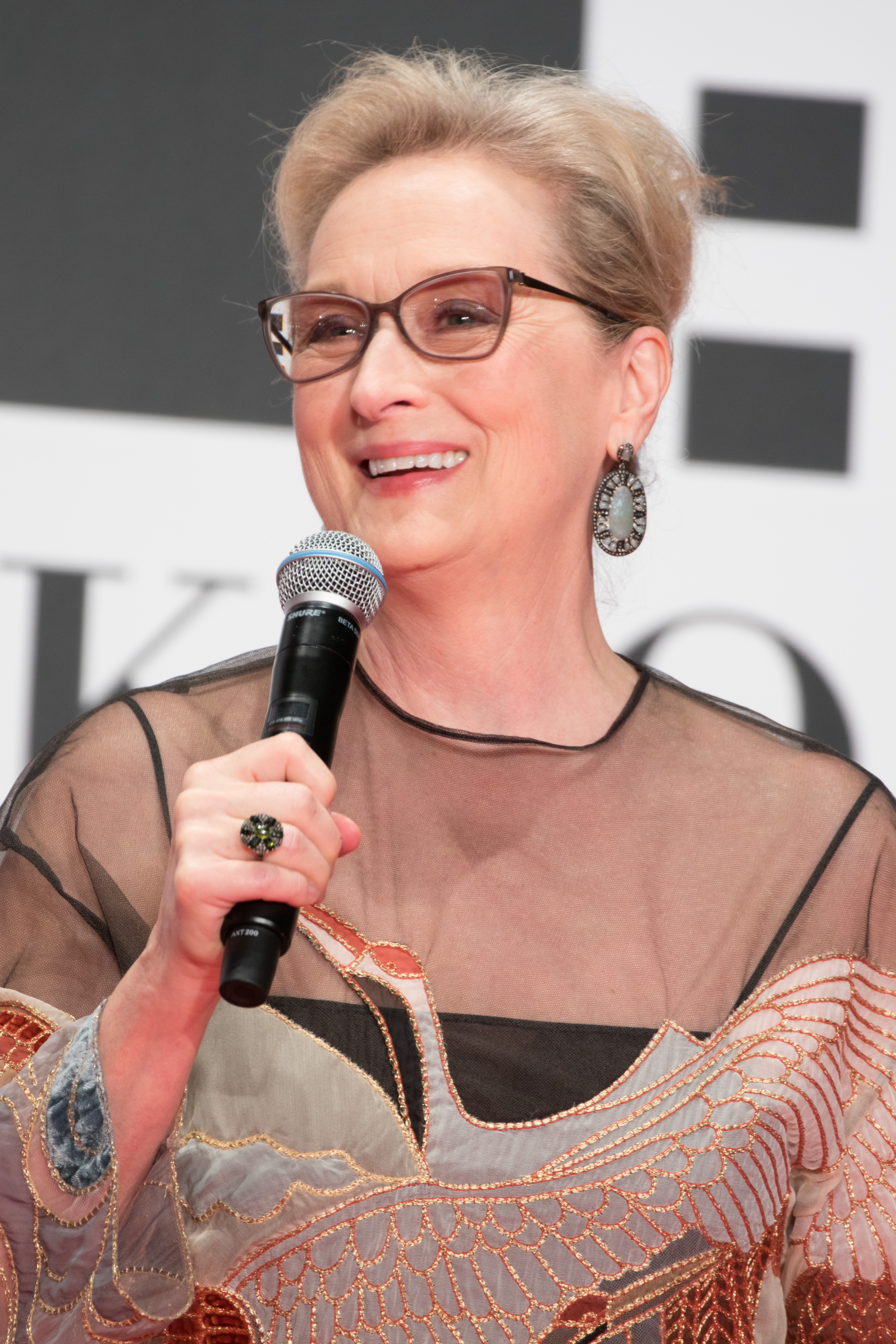
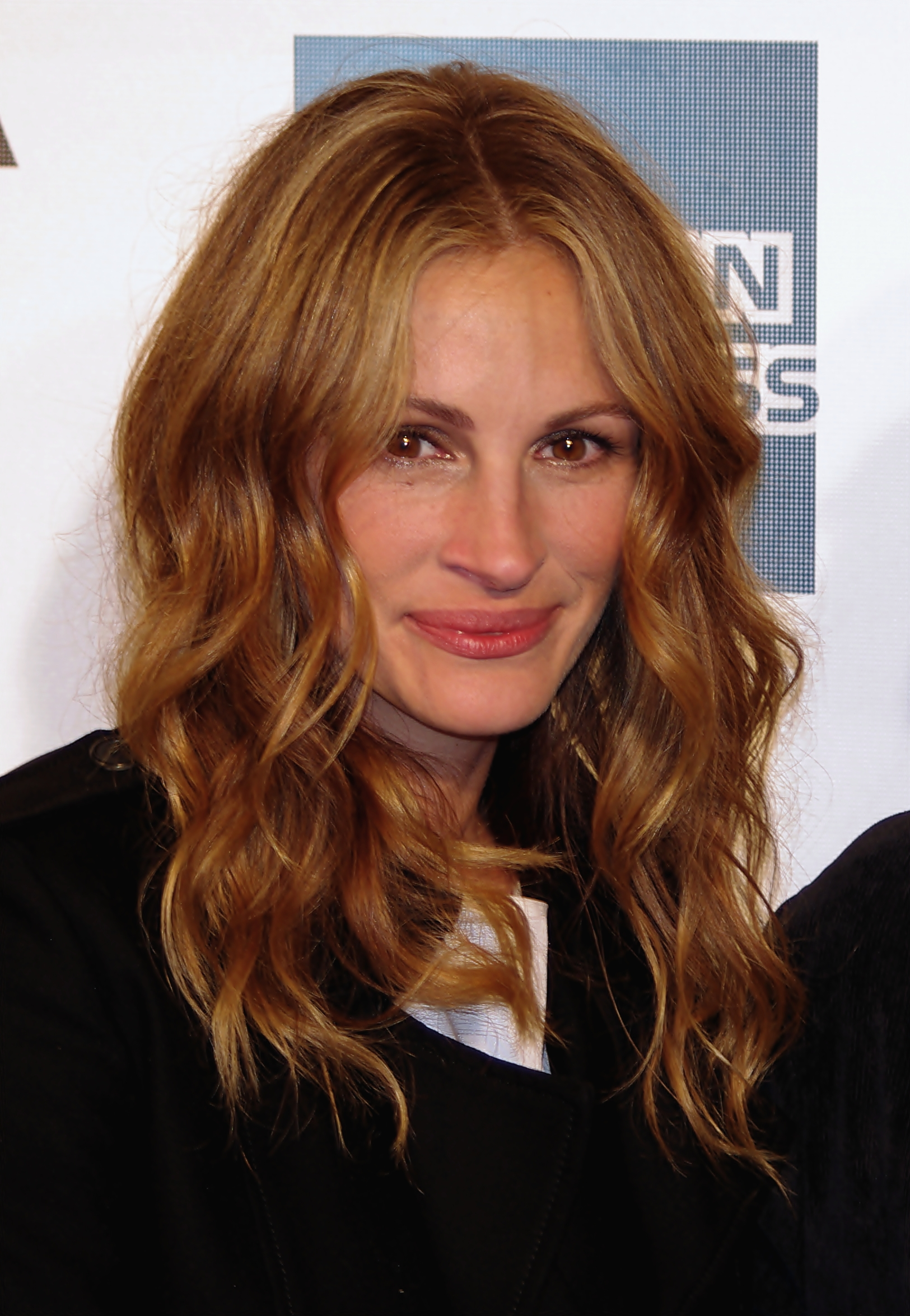
The performances of Meryl Streep and Julia Roberts garnered widespread critical acclaim, earning them Academy Award nominations for Best Actress and Best Supporting Actress respectively.

On the review aggregator website Rotten Tomatoes, 67% of 205 critics' reviews are positive, with an average rating of 6.5/10. The website's consensus reads: "The sheer amount of acting going on in August: Osage County threatens to overwhelm, but when the actors involved are as talented as Meryl Streep and Julia Roberts, it's difficult to complain." Metacritic, which uses a weighted average, assigned the film a score of 58 out of 100, based on 45 critics, indicating "mixed or average" reviews. Audiences surveyed by CinemaScore gave the film an average grade of "A−" on an A+ to F scale.

== Accolades ==
Awards	Category	Nominee(s)	Result
Academy Awards	Best Actress	Meryl Streep	Nominated
Academy Awards	Best Supporting Actress	Julia Roberts	Nominated
AACTA International Awards	Best Actress	Meryl Streep	Nominated
AACTA International Awards	Best Supporting Actress	Julia Roberts	Nominated
AARP Annual Movies for Grownups Awards	Best Supporting Actor	Chris Cooper	Won
American Cinema Editors	Best Edited Feature Film - Comedy/Musical	Stephen Mirrione	Nominated
Art Directors Guild	Excellence in Production Design - Contemporary Film	David Gropman	Nominated
BAFTA Awards	Best Supporting Actress	Julia Roberts	Nominated
Britannia Awards	British Artist of the Year	Benedict Cumberbatch (also for his work on 12 Years a Slave, The Fifth Estate, The Hobbit: The Desolation of Smaug, and Star Trek Into Darkness)	Won
Critics' Choice Movie Awards	Best Actress	Meryl Streep	Nominated
Critics' Choice Movie Awards	Best Supporting Actress	Julia Roberts	Nominated
Critics' Choice Movie Awards	Best Adapted Screenplay	Tracy Letts	Nominated
Detroit Film Critics Society	Best Actress	Meryl Streep	Nominated
Detroit Film Critics Society	Best Ensemble	Meryl Streep, Julia Roberts, Ewan McGregor, Chris Cooper, Abigail Breslin, Benedict Cumberbatch, Juliette Lewis, Margo Martindale, Dermot Mulroney, Julianne Nicholson, Sam Shepard, and Misty Upham	Nominated
Detroit Film Critics Society	Best Supporting Actress	Julia Roberts	Nominated
Golden Globe Awards	Best Actress in a Motion Picture – Musical or Comedy	Meryl Streep	Nominated
Golden Globe Awards	Best Supporting Actress in a Motion Picture	Julia Roberts	Nominated
Hollywood Film Festival	Ensemble of the Year	Meryl Streep, Julia Roberts, Ewan McGregor, Chris Cooper, Abigail Breslin, Benedict Cumberbatch, Juliette Lewis, Margo Martindale, Dermot Mulroney, Julianne Nicholson, Sam Shepard, and Misty Upham	Won
Hollywood Film Festival	Supporting Actress of the Year	Julia Roberts	Won
Motion Picture Sound Editors Golden Reel Awards	Best Sound Editing: Dialogue & ADR in a Feature Film	Lon Bender	Nominated
Oklahoma Film Critics Circle	Not-So-Obviously Worst Film	August: Osage County	Won
Phoenix Film Critics Society	Best Cast	Meryl Streep, Julia Roberts, Ewan McGregor, Chris Cooper, Abigail Breslin, Benedict Cumberbatch, Juliette Lewis, Margo Martindale, Dermot Mulroney, Julianne Nicholson, Sam Shepard, and Misty Upham	Nominated
Phoenix Film Critics Society	Best Adapted Screenplay	Tracy Letts	Nominated
Phoenix Film Critics Society	Best Actress	Meryl Streep	Nominated
Phoenix Film Critics Society	Best Supporting Actress	Julia Roberts	Nominated
Satellite Awards	Best Actress – Motion Picture	Meryl Streep	Nominated
Satellite Awards	Best Supporting Actress – Motion Picture	Julia Roberts	Nominated
Screen Actors Guild Awards	Outstanding Female Actor in a Leading Role	Meryl Streep	Nominated
Screen Actors Guild Awards	Outstanding Female Actor in a Supporting Role	Julia Roberts	Nominated
Screen Actors Guild Awards	Outstanding Cast in a Motion Picture	Meryl Streep, Julia Roberts, Ewan McGregor, Chris Cooper, Abigail Breslin, Benedict Cumberbatch, Juliette Lewis, Margo Martindale, Dermot Mulroney, Julianne Nicholson, Sam Shepard, and Misty Upham	Nominated
St. Louis Gateway Film Critics Association	Best Actress	Meryl Streep	Nominated
Washington D.C. Area Film Critics Association	Best Actress	Meryl Streep	Nominated
Washington D.C. Area Film Critics Association	Best Acting Ensemble	Meryl Streep, Julia Roberts, Ewan McGregor, Chris Cooper, Abigail Breslin, Benedict Cumberbatch, Juliette Lewis, Margo Martindale, Dermot Mulroney, Julianne Nicholson, Sam Shepard, and Misty Upham	Nominated
Writers Guild of America Award	Best Adapted Screenplay	Tracy Letts	Nominated

== Soundtrack ==
Gustavo Santaolalla composed the original music for August: Osage County. The soundtrack was released on December 31, 2013, through Sony Classical. An album of Santaolalla's score was released digitally on the same date.
