= Lyle, Lyle, Crocodile (soundtrack) =

Film soundtrack album

Lyle, Lyle, Crocodile (Original Motion Picture Soundtrack)

Soundtrack album by various artists
- Released: September 30, 2022
- Recorded: 2021–2022
- Genre: Pop
- Length: 47:04
- Label: Island
- Producers: Various: Benj Pasek; Justin Paul; Shawn Mendes; Ian Eisendrath; John Nathaniel; Pancho Cristal; David Metzger; Jon Bellion; TenRoc; The Diner; Doug Schadt; Stevie Wonder; Juan Ariza; Dave Gibson; David Sneddon; Marty Rod; Lonnie Simmons; Charles Wright; Gus Dudgeon

Pasek and Paul chronology
Dear Evan Hansen (Original Motion Picture Soundtrack) (2021)	Lyle, Lyle, Crocodile (Original Motion Picture Soundtrack) (2022)	Spirited (2022)

Lyle, Lyle, Crocodile (Original Motion Picture Soundtrack) is the soundtrack album to the 2022 film Lyle, Lyle, Crocodile, directed by Will Speck and Josh Gordon, based on the children's story of the same name and its prequel The House on East 88th Street by Bernard Waber. The album featured original songs written by Benj Pasek and Justin Paul along with Ari Afsar, Emily Gardner Xu Hall, Mark Sonnenblick, and Joriah Kwamé, alongside classic pop/rock songs written by Elton John and Stevie Wonder. Shawn Mendes, who voices the titular crocodile, had provided vocals for eight of the tracks. The album was released by Island Records on September 30, 2022. Lyle, Lyle, Crocodile (Original Motion Picture Score), another album featuring original score composed by Matthew Margeson was released on October 7, 2022 by Madison Gate Records.

== Background ==
Directors Will Speck and Josh Gordon zeroed in on songwriters Benj Pasek and Justin Paul, known for their work on La La Land (2016) and The Greatest Showman (2017), understanding the importance of the project as a musical. During production, Pasek and Paul joined the film as executive producers, saying that the premise of a singing crocodile made the film "exciting". With Shawn Mendes voicing Lyle, the duo "blended musical theater with contemporary pop, aiming to create something with his voice". The duo then brought in Ari Afsar, Emily Gardner Xu Hall, Mark Sonnenblick, and Joriah Kwamé to write songs for the album. The writers and musicians had to collaborate remotely using Google Docs and Zoom, due to COVID-19 pandemic. Will Speck and Josh Gordon had worked on mostly diegetic music, with Mendes performing the majority of the tracks as a singing crocodile.

The first track written for the film, was "Take a Look at us Now" performed by Javier Bardem as Hector, a showman and magician, which was a "charming and energetic anthem". Pasek wanted an energetic number, which also reflects the relationship between Lyle, Hector, and Josh (Winslow Fegley), with Kwamé suggesting the hook line, gave the song "the fire element which needed". The second song "Rip Up the Recipe" is an upbeat number performed by Constance Wu who plays Mrs. Primm, Josh's mother. While the song originally had lyrics reflecting her passion for cooking, in the film, Primm was revealed to be a cookbook author, hence they accommodated the lyrics to suit her character. Another ballad song "Carried Away", according to Pasek and Paul, "encapsulates the movie's central theme of belonging", as in a sequence, Lyle is in a Zoo, "and the lyrics reflect his desire to live free". Pasek says "It's this character trying not to give in to sadness instead of indulging in a feeling".

The executive producer Ian Eisendrath said "Since Lyle can only communicate through singing, Shawn's delivery of every note, rhythm, and lyric needed to function on two levels – letting us into Lyle's interior life and deepening and furthering his character and story." Kwamé also opined that Mendes' expressions at the end of his phrases "works well for musical theater". Mendes felt that writing music for a film was a challenging, as well as an inspiring process, but also said "The hardest part though is that when you are singing for a film instead of your own album, you really have to ace the nuances of the emotion behind every lyric and every note and match it to how the character will be portraying it on screen. That was a learning experience." He also felt "really comfortable" on voicing the titular crocodile as it sings throughout the film.

== Release ==
On September 21, 2022, Shawn Mendes revealed the track list of the original soundtrack, which features 15 tracks. The incorporated songs of the film include Elton John's "Crocodile Rock", Stevie Wonder's "Sir Duke", Pete Rodriguez's "I Like It Like That", while also including original tracks written by Pasek, Paul, Shawn Mendes and an array of writers. An original song written and performed by Mendes, titled "Heartbeat" was released as the album's promotional single on September 23, 2022. The soundtrack was released on September 30, by Island Records.

== Track listing ==
Lyle, Lyle, Crocodile (Original Motion Picture Soundtrack) track listing
No.	Title	Writer(s)	Producer(s)	Length
1.	"Top of the World" (Shawn Mendes)	Benj Pasek; Justin Paul; Joriah Kwamé	Benj Pasek; Justin Paul; Ian Eisendrath; John Nathaniel	2:51
2.	"I Like It Like That" (Pete Rodriguez)	Tony Pabón; Manny Rodriguez	Pancho Cristal	4:27
3.	"Take a Look at Us Now" (Javier Bardem and Shawn Mendes)	Pasek; Paul	Pasek; Paul; Eisendrath; David Metzger	3:17
4.	"Heartbeat" (Shawn Mendes)	Amy Allen; Clyde Lawrence; Jason Cornet; Jon Bellion; Jordan Cohen; Scott Harris; Shawn Mendes	Shawn Mendes; Jon Bellion; TenRoc; The Diner	2:20
5.	"Bye Bye Bye" (Claire Rosinkranz)	Claire Rosinkranz; Doug Schadt; Remi Wolf	Doug Schadt	3:01
6.	"Sir Duke" (Stevie Wonder)	Stevie Wonder	Stevie Wonder	3:54
7.	"Rip Up the Recipe" (Shawn Mendes and Constance Wu)	Pasek; Paul; Emily Gardner Xu Hall; Mark Sonnenblick	Pasek; Paul; Eisendrath; Juan Ariza	3:29
8.	"We Made It" (Anthony Ramos)	Dave Gibson; David Sneddon; Marty Rod	Dave Gibson; Marty Maro; David Sneddon	2:54
9.	"Steppin' Out" (The Gap Band)	Charlie Wilson; Lonnie Simmons; Ronnie Wilson	Lonnie Simmons	4:26
10.	"Take a Look at Us Now (Reprise)" (Javier Bardem and Shawn Mendes)	Pasek; Paul	Pasek; Paul; Eisendrath; Metzger	0:44
11.	"Express Yourself" (Charles Wright & the Watts 103rd Street Rhythm Band)	Charles Wright	Charles Wright	3:53
12.	"Take a Look at Us Now (Lyle reprise)" (Shawn Mendes)	Pasek; Paul	Pasek; Paul; Eisendrath; Metzger	1:13
13.	"Carried Away" (Shawn Mendes)	Pasek; Paul; Arianna Afsar; Sonnenblick	Pasek; Paul; Eisendrath; Nathaniel	3:46
14.	"Take a Look at Us Now (Finale)" (Shawn Mendes, Winslow Fegley, and Lyle, Lyle, Crocodile ensemble)	Pasek; Paul	Pasek; Paul; Eisendrath; Metzger	2:48
15.	"Crocodile Rock" (Elton John)	Elton John; Bernie Taupin	Gus Dudgeon	3:57

== Charts ==
Chart performance for Lyle, Lyle, Crocodile (Original Motion Picture Soundtrack)
Chart (2022)	Peak position
UK Soundtrack Albums (OCC)	20
UK Album Downloads Chart (OCC)	31

== Score album ==
Lyle, Lyle, Crocodile (Original Motion Picture Score)

Film score by Matthew Margeson
- Released: October 7, 2022
- Genre: Film score
- Length: 46:40
- Label: Madison Gate
- Producer: Matthew Margeson

Matthew Margeson chronology
The King's Man (2021)	Lyle, Lyle, Crocodile (2022)

In June 2022, Matthew Margeson was reported to score the film. The score album was released by Madison Gate Records on October 7.

Lyle, Lyle, Crocodile (Original Motion Picture Score) track listing
No.	Title	Length
1.	"Hector P. Valenti"	1:26
2.	"Exotic Animals"	0:54
3.	"Lyle Finds a Home"	1:22
4.	"Abandonment"	2:07
5.	"What Was That?"	1:42
6.	"Walk To School"	0:59
7.	"High School Wrestling"	1:24
8.	"Night on the Town"	3:04
9.	"Run to School"	1:06
10.	"Phone Memories"	1:19
11.	"Loretta"	0:45
12.	"Mrs. Primm Finds Lyle"	1:15
13.	"Classroom Chaos"	1:11
14.	"There's a Crocodile in the House"	0:52
15.	"Hector Returns"	1:37
16.	"Attic Wrestling"	1:45
17.	"Magical Magic"	1:22
18.	"The Stage Can Be a Cruel Mistress"	1:46
19.	"Kangaroo Court"	1:52
20.	"Animal Control"	2:25
21.	"Not All Problems Have a Solution"	2:00
22.	"Miracles Do Happen"	1:08
23.	"There Is No Magic"	2:49
24.	"Back to Where You Belong"	2:17
25.	"Motorcycle Chase"	3:17
26.	"You've Got to Sing"	1:59
27.	"Family Vacation"	2:57
Total length:		46:40
