= Inside Films =

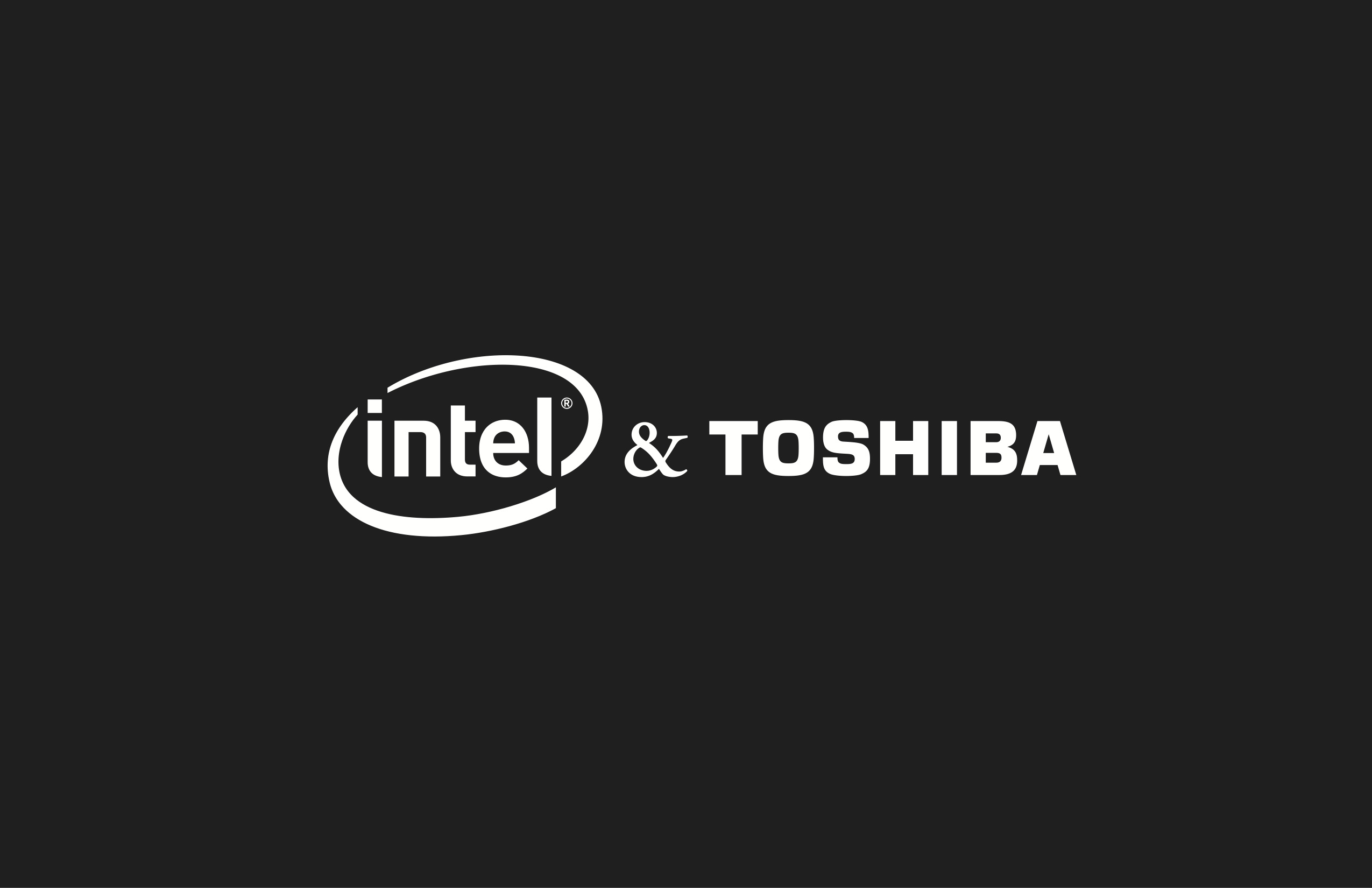
- Company type: Subsidiary
- Industry: Entertainment
- Founded: July 11, 2011; 14 years ago in Santa Clara and Irvine, California, USA
- Defunct: August 14, 2013
- Parent: Intel; Toshiba

Inside Films is a joint effort between Intel and Toshiba that focuses on creating social films. Founded in 2011, Inside Films has produced three social productions spanning three different genres.

== History ==
On July 11, 2011, a news release was released detailing plans for Intel and Toshiba to collaborate on a social film, Inside. The film would be released in episodic format, with each further episode's events being determined through social media.

On July 24, 2012, the two companies again teamed up for another social film, The Beauty Inside. The Beauty Inside won a daytime EMMY award at the 40th Daytime Creative Arts Emmy Awards on June 14, 2013.

A third joint collaboration was announced on July 25, 2013, titled The Power Inside.

== Productions ==
- Inside (2011)
- The Beauty Inside (2012)
- The Power Inside (2013)
