= (I'll Be with You) In Apple Blossom Time =

1920 popular song

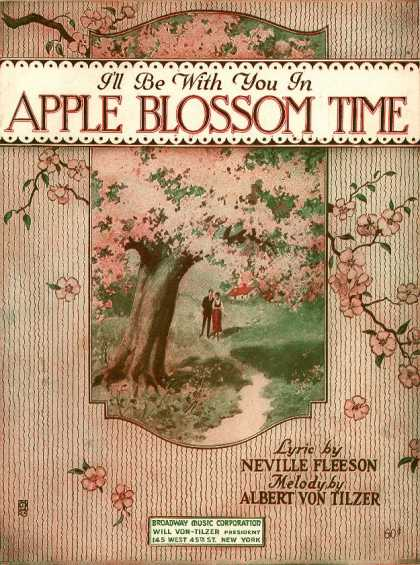
- Sheet music cover

Song
- Published: 1920 by Broadway Music Corp.
- Composer: Albert Von Tilzer
- Lyricist: Neville Fleeson

Audio sample
- Recording of (I'll Be with You) In Apple Blossom Time, performed by Charles W. Harrison (1920): file; help

"(I'll Be with You) In Apple Blossom Time" is a popular song written by American composer Albert Von Tilzer and lyricist Neville Fleeson, and copyrighted in 1920. It was introduced by Nora Bayes, who also recorded the song.

== Recordings ==
The song has been recorded by numerous artists including:

- Artie Shaw (1937)
- Harry James
- The Andrews Sisters (US No. 5, 1941) (Patty Andrews of the Andrews Sisters describes how they performed the song "in 4/4 [time] when originally it was a waltz".)
- Vera Lynn
- Nat King Cole
- Jo Stafford (1946)
- Charlie Rich
- The Four Aces as a B-side single to "Mr. Sandman" (1954)
- Anne Shelton
- Chet Atkins
- Louis Prima
- Tab Hunter (US No. 31, 1959)
- Rosemary June (UK No. 14, 1959)
- Ray Conniff
- The Bachelors
- Wayne Newton (US Hot 100, No. 52; US Easy Listening, No. 17, 1965)
- Barry Manilow
- Emmy Rossum (on Sentimental Journey, 2013)

== In popular culture ==
- The Andrews Sisters recording was also included in the 1941 film Buck Privates.
