= Lyle, Lyle, Crocodile (film) =

2022 film by Will Speck and Josh Gordon

- Theatrical release poster
- Directed by: Will Speck; Josh Gordon
- Screenplay by: William Davies
- Based on: Lyle, Lyle, Crocodile by Bernard Waber
- Produced by: Hutch Parker; Will Speck; Josh Gordon
- Starring: Javier Bardem; Constance Wu; Winslow Fegley; Scoot McNairy; Brett Gelman; Shawn Mendes
- Cinematography: Javier Aguirresarobe
- Edited by: Richard Pearson
- Music by: Matthew Margeson (score); Pasek and Paul (songs)
- Production companies: Columbia Pictures; Eagle Pictures; Hutch Parker Entertainment; Speck Gordon Inc.
- Distributed by: Sony Pictures Releasing
- Release date: October 7, 2022 (United States)
- Running time: 106 minutes
- Countries: United States; Italy
- Language: English
- Budget: $50 million
- Box office: $111 million

Lyle, Lyle, Crocodile is a 2022 musical comedy-drama film produced and directed by Will Speck and Josh Gordon from a screenplay by William Davies. Produced by Columbia Pictures and distributed by Sony Pictures Releasing, it is an adaptation of the children's story of the same name and its predecessor The House on East 88th Street by Bernard Waber. The plot focuses on a family who moves to New York City, where their struggling son befriends an anthropomorphic crocodile, Lyle, who can communicate verbally only by singing. The son tries to protect Lyle from the rest of the world. The film stars Shawn Mendes as Lyle's singing voice, alongside Javier Bardem, Constance Wu, Winslow Fegley, Scoot McNairy, and Brett Gelman.

Lyle, Lyle, Crocodile was released in the United States on October 7, 2022, by Columbia Pictures. The film received generally positive reviews from critics and grossed $111 million.

== Plot ==
In New York City, a charismatic magician named Hector P. Valenti wants to audition for a national talent show but is constantly rejected. One day after a failed audition, he wanders into an exotic pet store, where he finds a singing baby crocodile and names him Lyle. Seeing Lyle as an opportunity to become rich in the talent business, he places his three-story Victorian brownstone house as collateral for their performance, but then Lyle experiences stage fright during the premiere and Hector loses the house. Hector is forced to move out and reluctantly leaves Lyle to fend for himself while he tries to make more money.

18 months later, Joseph and Katie Primm and their young son Josh move into the house. Josh is initially terrified of moving into his new home and struggles to make friends at school. One night, he discovers Lyle, now fully grown, living in the attic, and they become friends when Lyle saves Josh from a mugger and demonstrates his singing talent. Katie and Joseph eventually find out about Lyle, and though initially terrified of him, bond with Lyle over their favorite hobbies. One day, Hector returns to the house to visit Lyle, as an agreement states he can live in the house 15 days a year. After Lyle sings in the Primms' presence, Hector makes another attempt to get Lyle to perform on stage, but it fails as Lyle still has stage fright.

Meanwhile, Alistair Grumps, the Primms' unfriendly downstairs neighbor, becomes annoyed by the loud activity caused by Lyle, Hector and the Primms. Determined to put an end to it, he has cameras installed to discover what is happening but manages to achieve his goal by bribing Hector to sell Lyle to pay his debts. Josh tries to get Lyle to sing to prove himself to the authorities, but he is unable to overcome his shyness and is locked up at the zoo. Feeling guilty for what he did to Lyle, Hector goes to break him out of the zoo with Josh's help, who was initially unwilling to help after learning Hector sold Lyle. On Josh's insistence, Hector apologises to Lyle and they reconcile before Lyle escapes with Josh to the talent show, while Hector distracts the authorities. On stage, Lyle overcomes his stage fright and performs with Josh and his friend Trudy's dance troupe who are also auditioning, garnering critical acclaim.

One month later, the Primms are on trial for keeping Lyle in their home in violation of city regulations. Hector presents the deed to his house, which was written by his grandmother, who built the house and founded the zoo, allowing her to keep any exotic animal as a pet, leading the judge to rule against Grumps in the Primms' favour. Following Grumps' loss in court, Joseph tackles him to the ground and delivering a beating off-screen, and Loretta ultimately decides to remain with the Primms, having grown to dislike Grumps' bad behavior. The Primms celebrate Lyle's freedom by taking him on vacation, while Hector becomes acquainted with a new talented animal; a beatboxing rattlesnake, named Malfoy, owned by Trudy.

== Cast ==
- Shawn Mendes as the singing voice of Lyle, an anthropomorphic crocodile who only sings
  - Ben Palacios portrayed the motion capture of Lyle
- Javier Bardem as Hector P. Valenti, Lyle's charismatic owner
- Winslow Fegley as Josh Primm, Joseph's son, Katie’s stepson and Lyle's best friend
- Constance Wu as Katie Primm, Josh's step-mother and Joseph's wife who is a cookbook author
- Scoot McNairy as Joseph Primm, Josh's father and Katie’s husband who is a math teacher
- Brett Gelman as Alistair Grumps, the Primms' downstairs neighbor who has a grudge against Lyle
- Ego Nwodim as Carol, an employee of the school where Mr. Primm works
- Lyric Hurd as Trudy, a teenage girl who becomes one of Josh's friends from school who owns a beatboxing rattlesnake named Malfoy
- Jason Kravits as Cy, a stage manager
- Sal Viscuso as the judge

== Production ==
Lyle, Lyle, Crocodile is a feature film adaptation of both the children's story of the same name and its prequel The House on East 88th Street, both of which were written by Bernard Waber. Both books were previously adapted as a 1987 animated HBO special titled Lyle, Lyle Crocodile: The Musical – The House on East 88th Street, which was also a musical. It was announced in May 2021 with filmmaking duo Will Speck and Josh Gordon attached to direct from a screenplay by William Davies for Sony Pictures. Filming took place in New York City in September 2021. Notable filming locations include 85th Street, 86th Street, Astor Place and Bowery station, and Broadway, between 45th Street and 46th Street. Visual effects were handled by Framestore, OPSIS, and Day for Nite. The production used Xsens equipment for motion capture performed by Ben Palacios (as well as Rudie Bolton for Young Lyle), and also used Unreal Engine and IClone Motion Live for visual effects. The film's dance sequences were choreographed by Shannon Holtzapffel, whose work was described as drawing on classic musical theatre while being designed around the characters' environments; he also developed Hector P. Valenti's movement around Javier Bardem's strengths, while Lyle's dance movement was developed through motion capture.

== Music ==
Original songs for the film were written by its executive producers Benj Pasek and Justin Paul along with Ari Afsar, Emily Gardner Xu Hall, Mark Sonnenblick, and Joriah Kwamé while Matthew Margeson composed the original score. Due to the COVID-19 pandemic, the songwriters collaborated remotely using Google Docs and Zoom. Shawn Mendes, who voices the titular crocodile, features on eight of the soundtrack album's tracks, which also contains songs by Elton John and Stevie Wonder. "Heartbeat" was released as the soundtrack's first single on September 23, 2022, with "Top of the World" becoming a double A sided single a few months later, and the soundtrack was released by Island Records on September 30. The score album was released by Madison Gate Records on October 7.

== Release ==
The film was released in theaters in the United States by Sony Pictures Releasing on October 7, 2022. It was originally going to be released on July 22, 2022, but in September 2021, the film was postponed to November 18, 2022. In April 2022, the film was brought forward to its October 7 date, taking over the release date of Spider-Man: Across the Spider-Verse. In March 2023, it was announced that the film would be released in China on April 15, 2023.

=== Home media ===
The film was released on VOD on November 22, 2022, and on Blu-ray, DVD, and 4K UHD on December 13, 2022.

== Reception ==
=== Box office ===
Lyle, Lyle, Crocodile grossed $46.9 million in the United States and Canada, and $64.1 million in other territories, for a worldwide total of $111 million against a production budget of $50 million.

In the United States and Canada, Lyle, Lyle, Crocodile was released alongside Amsterdam, and was projected to gross $11–12 million from 4,350 theaters in its opening weekend. The film made $3.5 million on its first day, including $575,000 from Thursday night previews. It went on to debut to $11.5 million, finishing second behind holdover Smile. The film made $7.4 million in its second weekend, dropping 35% and finishing in third. Lyle, Lyle, Crocodile then made $4.3 million in its third weekend, declining 42% and finishing in fifth place.

=== Critical response ===
On the review aggregator website Rotten Tomatoes, 71% of 93 critics' reviews are positive, with an average rating of 6.1/10. The website's consensus reads: "Parents may not be beguiled, but Lyle, Lyle, Crocodile is bound to make most children smile." Metacritic, which uses a weighted average, assigned the film a score of 51 out of 100, based on 17 critics, indicating "mixed or average" reviews. Audiences polled by CinemaScore gave the film an average grade of "A−" on an A+ to F scale, while those at PostTrak gave it an 80% overall positive score, with 62% saying they would definitely recommend it.

Cath Clarke of The Guardian gave the film a mixed review giving it 3 out of 5 stars and wrote: "Javier Bardem marches away with the film as flamboyant failed showman Hector P Valenti. Next to his dazzle, everything else about Lyle, Lyle Crocodile, adapted from Bernard Waber's much-loved picture books, looks a bit average."

Ryan Leston for IGN called the film "charming", praising the character of Hector writing: "Sure, it's not exactly original, essentially a mish-mash of similar films including Hop and Sing, and most of the laughs feel familiar. But Lyle, Lyle, Crocodile conjures up enough of the old showbiz charm to win you over. It's heart-warming, too – Lyle may be the singer, but he helps those around him find their voice, and sometimes that's exactly what we need: a singing crocodile to just be a good pal."

Robert Abele was less than positive with his review writing for The Wrap: "Did Lyle, Lyle, Crocodile look good in storyboards or sound fun in creative meetings? Because it's a certifiable mess on its webbed hind feet, teetering uncomfortably as both fanciful family comedy and live-action/animated musical, whether trying to make dumpster diving look whimsical (it isn't) or the tunes sound like anything but positivity-anthem-generator readouts."

Nell Minow, writing for RogerEbert.com, was more positive in her review of the film, giving it a score of 3 out of 4 stars. She wrote: "Lyle, Lyle, Crocodile is a bit too long for a family movie, with some unnecessary complications toward the end, and it's not quite up to the Paddington level of movie adaptations of classic children's books. But it is a warm-hearted family film with great musical numbers that will make another generation of kids hopefully search the attic on the chance that they might find a singing crocodile."

The film's musical sequences received particular praise. The New York Times described "Take a Look at Us Now" as a "charming and exuberant musical number" in which Bardem and Lyle "leap, tap and twirl". Deadline Hollywood highlighted the film's dance numbers, including "Top of the World" and "Rip Up the Recipe". Vanity Fair later included "Take a Look at Us Now" among its ten best musical movie moments of 2022. IndieWire praised Bardem's physical performance in the number, highlighting his "Old Hollywood chops" as he leapt on chairs and slid across floors.

=== Awards ===
Lyle, Lyle, Crocodile was nominated for Best Family Movie at the 2023 Movieguide Awards. The film also received a nomination for Best Digital – Animation/Family at the 2023 Golden Trailer Awards.
