= Pound Ridge Golf Club =

Golf facility in Pound Ridge, New York

Coordinates: 41°10′35″N 73°34′12″W

Club information
- Location: Pound Ridge, New York
- Established: 2008
- Type: Public
- Tota holes: 18
- Website: www.poundridgegolf.com
- Designed by: Pete Dye
- Par: 72
- Length: 7,165 yards

The Pound Ridge Golf Club is an 18-hole, public golf facility designed by World Golf Hall of Fame designer Pete Dye in Pound Ridge, New York.

== Overview ==
The course is a par of 72 and is on 172 acres (0.70 km^{2}). It features 7,165 yards of course from the back tees. It is Pete Dye's first and only design project in New York.

The course was built at an estimated cost of $40 million by Kenneth Wang, brother of American fashion designer Vera Wang, and the current owner of the U.S. Summit Company.

It was listed as the second best of Links Magazine's Best New Public Courses of 2008.
