= HBO Storybook Musicals =

- Genre: Animation special
- Starring: Various
- Country of origin: United States
- Original language: English
- No. of episodes: 18

Production
- Production companies: HBO; Michael Sporn Animation; Klasky Csupo (episode 6); Cinar ("The Real Story of..."); Random House (episode 18)

Original release
- Network: HBO
- Release: November 18, 1987 – December 8, 1993

HBO Storybook Musicals is a series of television specials that aired on HBO, combining animation that is true to the original storybook's illustrations, plus high-spirited songs from musical songwriters. The specials have also aired on HBO Family.

== Background ==
When Doctor DeSoto was nominated for an Academy Award for Best Animated Short, HBO and animator Michael Sporn agreed to make animated specials for the network as it also was oriented on family-friendly programs and never financed/produced a children's television series before. Sporn directed and produced Lyle, Lyle, Crocodile: The Musical, HBO's first animated television special and aired on November 18, 1987. Then, HBO presented a few animated specials, such as The Story of the Dancing Frog (aired in October 1989), The Red Shoes and Earthday Birthday, both aired in early 1990. The specials combined illustrations with songs.

== Episodes ==
The first four episodes originally aired as individual, stand-alone TV specials; the HBO Storybook Musicals branding was introduced with the fifth episode. 18 episodes of HBO Storybook Musicals aired from 1987 to 1993. In addition, only eight episodes are currently owned by Home Box Office, while others are owned by other distributors, such as WildBrain (formerly known as DHX Media) and First Run Features.

No.	Title	Original release date
1	"Lyle, Lyle, Crocodile: The Musical"	November 18, 1987
The Primm family grows fond of a crocodile left in their new home by its previous owners. Based on The House on East 88th Street by Bernard Waber.
2	"The Story of the Dancing Frog"	October 3, 1989
George the Dancing Frog brings joy to Gertrude, a lonely widow. Narrated by Amanda Plummer.
3	"The Red Shoes"	February 7, 1990
The Hans Christian Andersen tale is given a modern setting in the story of Lisa, a li'l black girl who learns the value of friendship with help from a pair of magic slippers. Narrated by Ossie Davis.
4	"Earthday Birthday"	April 22, 1990
The Zwibble-Dibbles are star-touched dinosaurs who live in an idyllic woodland. Dismayed by the pollution of the planet, they plan a birthday party for the Earth so that children can learn about, and appreciate, its fragile beauty. Featuring the voices of Christopher Reeve, Fred Gwynne, and Lainie Kazan.
5	"Mike Mulligan and His Steam Shovel"	September 10, 1990
When newfangled equipment threatens to put Mike Mulligan and his steam shovel Mary Anne out of business, they take on the challenge of digging a cellar in one day, and find a community that appreciates their skills. Starring the voice of Robert Klein.
6	"Alexander and the Terrible, Horrible, No Good, Very Bad Day"	October 2, 1990
The story of a boy's bad experiences during the course of a day.
7	"The Marzipan Pig"	November 5, 1990
A marzipan pig falls behind a sofa and is lost. In his loneliness, the pig's feelings of love reach out, in a strange chain of events, to an owl, a mouse, and a hibiscus flower. Narrated by Tim Curry.
8	"The Little Match Girl"	December 6, 1990
The Hans Christian Andersen classic is given present-day relevance and an upbeat ending in this story of Angela, a homeless child who sells match sticks to survive. Narrated by F. Murray Abraham.
9	"The Tale of Peter Rabbit"	June 11, 1991
Carol Burnett narrates Beatrix Potter's story of a mischievous rabbit named Peter, who can't resist Mr. McGregor's garden and almost ends up in a pie just like his father did once.
10	"The Ice Queen's Mittens"	October 2, 1991
Freezelda the Ice Queen needs warm mittens, so three kittens had better look out. Part of "The Real Story of..." series. Featuring the voices of Bryan Adams and Lauren Bacall.
11	"Spider Junior High"	October 16, 1991
Spider Junior High students try to scare their human counterparts. Part of "The Real Story of..." series. Featuring the voices of Malcolm-Jamal Warner and Patti LaBelle.
12	"Ira Sleeps Over"	November 6, 1991
Ira has been invited to stay overnight at his best friend Reggie's house. But what will Reggie think if Ira sleeps with his teddy bear Tah Tah? Ira makes a difficult decision, only to discover that Reggie has his own li'l secret.
13	"The Prince's Rain"	November 13, 1991
A selfish prince is taught a lesson about caring and love when he tries to fool Mother Nature. Part of "The Real Story of..." series. Featuring the voice of Robin Leach.
14	"The Runaway Teapot"	December 4, 1991
"Alice in Wonderland" in a modern-day setting in New York City. Part of "The Real Story of..." series.
15	"The Rise and Fall of Humpty Dumpty"	December 18, 1991
Humpty Dumpty tries to save a princess from an evil witch. Part of "The Real Story of..." series.
16	"Happy Birthday to You"	January 4, 1992
Olivia wants a special song for her birthday, but who will write it—her tone-deaf caretaker, or a musically talented new friend? Part of "The Real Story of..." series.
17	"A Child's Garden of Verses"	April 3, 1992
Childhood illness has confined young Robbie to bed, but it cannot confine his remarkable imagination, which he uses to experience life.
18	"The Country Mouse and the City Mouse: A Christmas Tale"	December 8, 1993
Emily the mouse has an adventure when she decides to visit her cousin Alexander in New York City for Christmas.
