= Nola (film) =

- Directed by: Alan Hruska
- Written by: Alan Hruska
- Produced by: Jill Footlick; Rachel Peters
- Starring: Emmy Rossum; James Badge Dale; Mary McDonnell; Steven Bauer
- Cinematography: Horacio Marquínez
- Edited by: Peter C. Frank
- Music by: Edmund Choi
- Distributed by: Fireworks Pictures; IDP Distribution
- Release date: 2003
- Running time: 97 minutes
- Country: United States
- Language: English

Nola is a 2003 American romantic comedy film written and directed by Alan Hruska, starring Emmy Rossum.

The story depicts the struggle of a young woman trying to survive in New York City while looking for her birth father.

The film premiered in New York City on July 23, 2004.

== Plot ==
After fleeing from her abusive stepfather in Kansas, Nola travels to NYC searching for her biological father. She sleeps her first night in Central Park, but her luck changes when she is hired by the owner of a small diner.

Nola ends up staying with the frycook/law school student Ben until the real owner of the diner, Ben's landlady Margaret, offers her a job as her assistant for an escort service. Initially resistant, she is shown the luxurious room included with the job. Nola agrees to meet up with Ben over food to talk about her options.

Ben reveals he is in night school to become a lawyer, then asks why Nola left Kansas. She explains her story of abuse: unwittingly coerced by her stepfather into discovering which prescriptions the elderly in their trailer park have, he subsequently robs them so he and her mom could get high. Here, the 18-year-old Nola hopes to become someone.

Back at Ben's, Ben discovers Nola has removed a page from his phone book. So, she explains the main reason she came to NYC: as her father had unknowingly empregnated her mother while passing through Kansas, she hopes to meet him. Her an ad in the paper had only gotten lewd responses.

Nola finally accepts the job at the escort service, and everything is great until Niles Sterling, a billionaire client of Margaret's service, has a bad session. He likes having rough physical activity from a trans woman, but only to a point. Wendy, one of Niles's favorites, went a little too far, sending Niles into a rage.

Meanwhile, Ben's law professor, frustrated with his seemingly lackadaisical behavior, suggests he take on a pro bono case to get some experience. Nola tells Ben the real story about Wendy and the investment banker, which is printed in the paper as a mugging.

Niles demands Margaret rough Wendy up or he will have it done, along with sending the police after the escort service. Nola attempts to help by making her up to look battered and bruised, documenting it with photos, then sending her out of the country until Niles calms down.

Wendy is spotted without the bruise makeup, trying to flee. Niles responds by arranging a subpoena for Margaret to appear before a grand jury and calling Nola directly, threatening her by revealing detailed information about her upbringing. Journalist Lionel Treblanc (Leo) is assigned to do a story on escort services. Niles specifically asks for him due to his hard-hitting reputation.

When Leo arrives at Margaret's, it is apparent they have a history. He suggests she lawyer up, but she explains that both she contacted cancelled once Niles got to them. So Nola convinces Margaret to contact Ben.

Niles pushes Nola into meeting up with him, so she chooses a high class restaurant which snubbed her initially to rub it into the maitre d's nose. Niles tries to intimidate and manipulate her, but she stands strong. Margaret is distraught upon learning of the meeting, but Nola assures her she will be careful.

Ben finally shows up and is convinced to represent Margaret. In court, he convinces the judge that the case was brought there as a vendetta towards her. Margaret basically gets a slap on the wrist.

Niles gets his driver to take Nola to him by coercing her, as he is holding her mother captive. Simultaneously, as Ben is talking to Leo for his story, he mentions Nola is seeking her father 'Hutch'.

Nola is made to carry out a roleplay in which she dresses up like a housewife and punishes him, who is in diapers. He suddenly insists he flip the roles so he can strip and beat her. Nola fends him off long enough for Ben, Leo and Margaret to bust in. Leo pulls some strings and gets Nola's mother into rehab.

Ben takes Nola to meet her father, who Leo has found upon hearing the name 'Hutch'. Both Margaret and Leo are there, and he reveals he must be her father. After Nola sings a song for Ben, she kisses him. Turning to Leo, she slaps him, then tells him he has a lot to make up for.

== Cast ==
- Emmy Rossum as Nola
- Steven Bauer as Leo
- James Badge Dale as Ben
- Thom Christopher as Niles Sterling
- Sam Coppola as Gus
- Adam LeFevre as Sam
- Michael Cavadias as Wendy
- Damian Young as Maitre D'
- Mary McDonnell as Margaret Langworthy
- James Ransone as Neo-Gothboy

== Release and reception ==
Nola received a limited release on August 29, 2003. On its opening weekend, the film grossed $6,010 at 19 theaters, with a per-theater average of $316. The film grossed a total of $10,550.

On Rotten Tomatoes, the film has a 0% approval rating from critics, based on 13 reviews.
