= Arthur P. Becker =

American investor and real estate developer (born 1949/1950)

Arthur Becker
- Born: Arthur Paul Becker; 1949 or 1950 (age 76–77)
- Education: Bennington College, Tuck School of Business
- Occupation: Businessman
- Spouse: Vera Wang (m. 1989; sep. 2012)
- Children: 2
- Relatives: Emmy Rossum (cousin); Sam Esmail (cousin-in-law)

Arthur Paul Becker (born 1949/1950) is an American investor and real estate developer. He is best known as the former CEO of NaviSite and Zinio. Becker was married to Vera Wang for 23 years and was an advisor on growing her business into a global brand. He graduated from Bennington College in 1972 and earned his MBA from the Tuck School of Business at Dartmouth College.

== Career ==
In 1986, Becker started his business career as a stockbroker at Bear Stearns & Co. Inc., later becoming a director at the company. He developed several business ventures including Bnox, a sports binoculars company, and an investment in a macadamia nut farm in Hawaii.

By the early 2000s, Becker began buying technology companies through ClearBlue Technologies and its parent investment fund, Atlantic Investors. In 2002, Becker purchased a controlling stake in NaviSite, a web hosting company. He was the company's chief executive officer until 2010 after which NaviSite was sold to Time Warner Cable for $230 million. In 2012, Becker joined the digital magazine newsstand platform Zinio as the company's chairman and chief executive officer until moving into the real estate business.

Becker purchased 465 Washington Street in Tribeca and invested in 10 Sullivan Street Soho, New York in 2012. By 2016, he had acquired 30, 40 and 50 Sullivan Street as well as 111 West 57th Street with JDS Development Group and Property Markets Group, and other real estate development projects in New York and Miami. By March 2017, Becker announced a redesign of the eight-unit apartment building on 465 Washington Street in Tribeca.

== Personal life ==
In 1989, Becker married Vera Wang in an interfaith Baptist and Jewish ceremony. They resided in Manhattan with their two adopted daughters: Cecilia (born 1990) and Josephine (born 1993). In July 2012, Vera Wang Co. announced that the couple had separated. The separation was amicable.
