= Emmy Rossum =

American actress (born 1986)

- Rossum in 2025
- Born: Emmanuelle Grey Rossum; September 12, 1986 (age 40); New York City, U.S.
- Occupations: Actress; singer
- Years active: 1993–present
- Spouses: Justin Siegel (m. 2008; div. 2010) Sam Esmail (m. 2017)
- Children: 2
- Relatives: Arthur P. Becker (cousin)

Emmanuelle Grey Rossum (born September 12, 1986) is an American actress and singer. Her accolades include a Critics' Choice Award and a Saturn Award, in addition to nominations for a Golden Globe Award and an Independent Spirit Award.

Born and raised in Manhattan's Upper East Side, Rossum began professionally performing as a child with the Metropolitan Opera before taking early film roles in Songcatcher (2000), Nola (2003), Mystic River (2003), and The Day After Tomorrow (2004). She received critical acclaim for portrayal of Christine Daaé in the film adaptation of the musical The Phantom of the Opera (2004) for which she was nominated for the Golden Globe Award for Best Actress in a Motion Picture – Musical or Comedy. She has since acted in the films Poseidon (2006), Dragonball: Evolution (2009), Inside (2011), Beautiful Creatures (2013), Comet (2014), You're Not You (2014), and Cold Pursuit (2019).

On television, Rossum is best known for her portrayal of Fiona Gallagher in the Showtime comedy-drama series Shameless (2011–2019). Since the mid-2010s, she has directed and produced television, including the Peacock series Angelyne (2022) in which she also starred. She has also taken roles in the Apple TV+ series The Crowded Room (2024) and the Hulu series Furious (2026).

On stage, she made her debut as Juliet in a production of the William Shakespeare tragedy Romeo and Juliet (2006) and has since acted off-Broadway and on Broadway. She has also released two albums Inside Out (2007) and Sentimental Journey (2013).

== Early life and education ==
Emmanuelle Grey Rossum was born on September 12, 1986, in New York City. She is the only child of Cheryl Rossum, a single mother who worked as a corporate photographer. Her parents separated while her mother was pregnant, and as of 2007, she had met her father only twice.

Rossum's mother is of Russian Jewish descent, and her father is a White Christian Protestant of English and Dutch ancestry. Rossum identifies as Jewish and has stated that her mother instilled in her the "Jewish code of ethics and morals". She was named for her maternal great-grandfather, whose first name was Emanuel, using the feminine spelling.

Upon singing "Happy Birthday" in all 12 keys, Rossum was welcomed to join the Metropolitan Opera Children's Chorus by chorus director Elena Doria at age seven. Over the course of five years she sang onstage with the chorus and had the chance to perform with singers such as Plácido Domingo and Luciano Pavarotti. For anywhere from $5 to $10 a night, Rossum sang in six languages in 20 operas, including La bohème, Turandot, a Carnegie Hall presentation of La damnation de Faust, and A Midsummer Night's Dream. She also worked under the direction of Franco Zeffirelli in Carmen.

An increasing interest in pursuing acting led to taking classes with Flo Salant Greenberg of The New Actors Workshop in New York City. She has also worked with acting coach Terry Knickerbocker.

Rossum attended the Spence School, a private school in Manhattan, before dropping out to pursue career opportunities. She received her high school diploma at 15 years old via online-extension courses offered by Stanford University's Education Program for Gifted Youth (EPGY). She then enrolled at Columbia University, studying French, art history and philosophy.

== Career ==
=== 1997–2008: Rise to prominence ===
Rossum's television debut was in August 1997, as the original Abigail Williams in the daytime soap opera As the World Turns. She also had a guest role as Caroline Beels in Snoops. Rossum was nominated for a Young Artist Award in 1999 for Best Performance in a TV movie for her work in the Disney Channel Original Movie Genius. She then portrayed a young Audrey Hepburn in the ABC television film The Audrey Hepburn Story (2000).

Rossum made her film debut at 13, in 2000's Songcatcher, as Deladis Slocumb, an Appalachian orphan. Debuting at the Sundance Film Festival, the film won the Special Jury Award for Outstanding Ensemble Performance. For her role, Rossum received an Independent Spirit Award nomination for Best Debut Performance and also had the opportunity to sing a duet with Dolly Parton on the Songcatcher soundtrack. Variety magazine named Rossum as "One of the Ten to Watch" in 2000. In Nola (2003), Rossum played the title character, an aspiring songwriter. In her first major studio film, Clint Eastwood's Mystic River (2003), Rossum starred as Katie Markum, the ill-fated daughter of small-business owner Jimmy Markum, played by Sean Penn.

Rossum had a breakthrough role as Laura Chapman in the sci-fi-disaster film The Day After Tomorrow (2004). She later returned to New York, where she was the last to audition, in full costume and make-up, for the role of Christine Daaé in The Phantom of the Opera (2004), the onscreen adaptation of composer Andrew Lloyd Webber's musical of the same name. After having nearly missed the audition due to a family engagement, Rossum was asked to audition in person for Lloyd Webber at his home in New York. For her performance, Rossum received a Golden Globe Award nomination for Best Actress in a musical or comedy. She also received a Critics' Choice Award for Best Young Actress, along with a Saturn Award for Best Performance by a Younger Actor.

In 2006, Rossum appeared in Poseidon, Wolfgang Petersen's remake of the disaster film The Poseidon Adventure. She played Jennifer Ramsey, the daughter of Kurt Russell's character. Rossum described the character as being proactive and strong in all situations, rather than a damsel in distress. Rossum also appeared as Juliet Capulet in a 2006 Williamstown Theatre Festival production of William Shakespeare's Romeo and Juliet. In early 2009, Rossum appeared in the poorly received Dragonball Evolution. Her next big screen venture was the indie Dare, which was an official selection of the 2009 Sundance Film Festival. In November 2009, Rossum appeared in Broadway's 24 Hour Plays in which actors, writers, and directors collaborate to produce, and perform six one-act plays within 24 hours to benefit the Urban Arts Partnership. Rossum appeared in Warren Leight's "Daily Bread", directed by Lucie Tiberghien.

=== 2009–2019: Shameless and other roles ===
Yes, why not? Sure. I mean, if the story is there, then it should absolutely be told.

— Rossum when asked if she would be interested in reprising her role of Fiona in a Shameless revival.

In December 2009, Rossum joined the cast of the Showtime dramedy series Shameless, based on the British series of the same title. The series co-stars William H. Macy. Rossum plays the oldest sister of a large, motherless family, functioning as a guardian/surrogate mother to her five younger siblings. The series has received consistent acclaim, with Rossum's performance being universally praised. She made her directorial debut with episode four of season seven, "I Am a Storm." In December 2016, Rossum was in a contract dispute with the show's producers over her desire for a salary equal to that of co-star Macy and back pay for the differential over seven seasons, which was resolved later that month. Following this news, Shameless was renewed for its eighth season beginning production in 2017. In August 2018, Rossum announced her departure from Shameless after nine seasons.

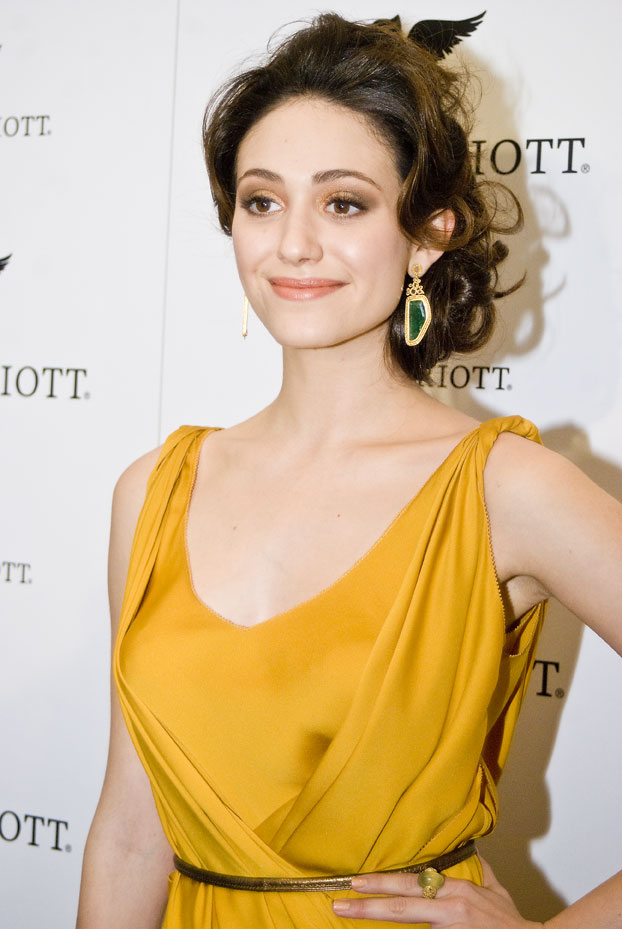
Rossum in 2011

In mid-2011, Rossum starred in D. J. Caruso's social film, Inside; the online film aired in several segments, incorporating multiple social media platforms including Facebook, YouTube, and Twitter. The following year, Rossum played Ridley, a siren Caster in Beautiful Creatures (2013), based on the young adult fantasy novel of the same name. Although the film was released to mixed reviews, Rossum's performance was praised by critics and fans. She also starred in the drama You're Not You as Bec, an inexperienced caregiver who looks after and befriends Kate (Hilary Swank), who suffers from the degenerative disease ALS. By June 2013, Rossum was cast as the female lead opposite Justin Long in the independent romantic comedy Comet, which was directed by Sam Esmail, to whom she later became engaged. Afterward she appeared in the film Before I Disappear (2014), based on the Academy Award-winning short film Curfew.

In 2019, it was announced that Rossum would star in Angelyne, a drama series co-produced by her husband and longtime collaborator Sam Esmail, for Peacock, the new streaming service by NBC. The limited series was her first lead role after Shameless and was based on The Hollywood Reporter senior writer Gary Baum's investigative feature on the LA billboard model Angelyne.

=== 2020–present ===
In 2023, she acted in the Apple TV+ limited series The Crowded Room acting opposite Tom Holland and Amanda Seyfried. In 2024, Rossum starred alongside Zoë Winters in an Off-Broadway staging of Amy Berryman's play Walden, directed by Whitney White. The play was the final production by Second Stage Theater in the Tony Kiser Theater. In 2026, she starred as an FBI agent investigating a serial killer in the Hulu crime drama series Furious which she also serves as an executive producer.

== Music career ==
After her role in The Phantom of the Opera, Rossum was offered several deals to record classical music albums, but refused, opting to create an album of contemporary, more mainstream music. She explained it by feeling frustrated because of the lack of "emotional honesty" in music played in radios. Regarding the sound and style of her music, she said, "It's pop music, but not Britney Spears bubblegum pop. I want it to have a David Gray or Annie Lennox feel. I've been spending up to 12 hours a day in the studio." Rossum cites Sarah McLachlan, Whitney Houston, Celine Dion and Faith Hill as some of her influences. Rossum's album Inside Out was produced by Stuart Brawley. It was released on October 23, 2007, and peaked at 199 in the U.S. Billboard charts. For the promotion of the record, Geffen Records featured the song, "Slow Me Down," as part of the second volume of Hollywood Records' Girl Next compilation album, which was released on July 10, 2007. Later that year, she was chosen as Yahoo's "Who's Next" artist of the month and a "One to Watch" by MSN. In December 2007, Rossum released three Christmas songs on the EP Carol of the Bells. It was also this year that Rossum sang the national anthem at the Save Mart 350 NASCAR NEXTEL Cup Series race at Infineon Raceway and performed at the first ever Perez Hilton Presents event at the El Rey Theatre in Hollywood. On October 27, 2007, Rossum again sang the national anthem at the New Jersey Devils's first home game of the 2007–08 NHL season, which was also the first game the team played in the newly constructed Prudential Center. She also performed at the Hollywood Christmas Celebration at the Grove in Los Angeles and the Lighting of the Great Tree in Atlanta, Georgia.

She joined Counting Crows, Augustana, and Michael Franti & Spearhead as a "special guest" for select performances of the "Traveling Circus and Medicine Show" tour in early 2009. In 2010, Rossum sang a song called "Cruel One" on singer Alex Band's debut solo album We've All Been There. On the track she sings with Band, and Chantal Kreviazuk. Rossum released the Warner Bros. Records album Sentimental Journey on January 29, 2013. Unlike Inside Out on which Rossum wrote the songs herself, the album is a collection of covers of songs from the 1920s to 1960s. Sentimental Journey peaked at 92 on the U.S. Billboard charts, and number one in Jazz Albums. Rossum describes herself as a lyric soprano, while saying her voice is still developing. She continues to train vocally at ZajacStudio, a studio run by soprano Joann C. Zajac.

== Charity work and advocacy ==
Rossum was a YouthAIDS ambassador. In 2008, she was signed as the spokesperson for Pinkitude, an apparel line inspired by the Pink Panther character, to help raise breast cancer awareness. In 2010, she appeared in public service announcements for the Natural Resources Defense Council (NRDC) Action Fund. She also works with Global Green USA to raise money for environmental protection and awareness of ecological issues. In 2015, Rossum campaigned with the Best Friends Animal Society to encourage animal adoption.

On May 26, 2009, Rossum attended a march in West Hollywood California protesting the California Supreme Court's ruling to uphold Proposition 8.

In February 2024, Rossum was one of 400 celebrities who signed an open letter by Creative Community for Peace denouncing attempts to remove Israel from Eurovision 2024 amid the Gaza war.

== Personal life ==
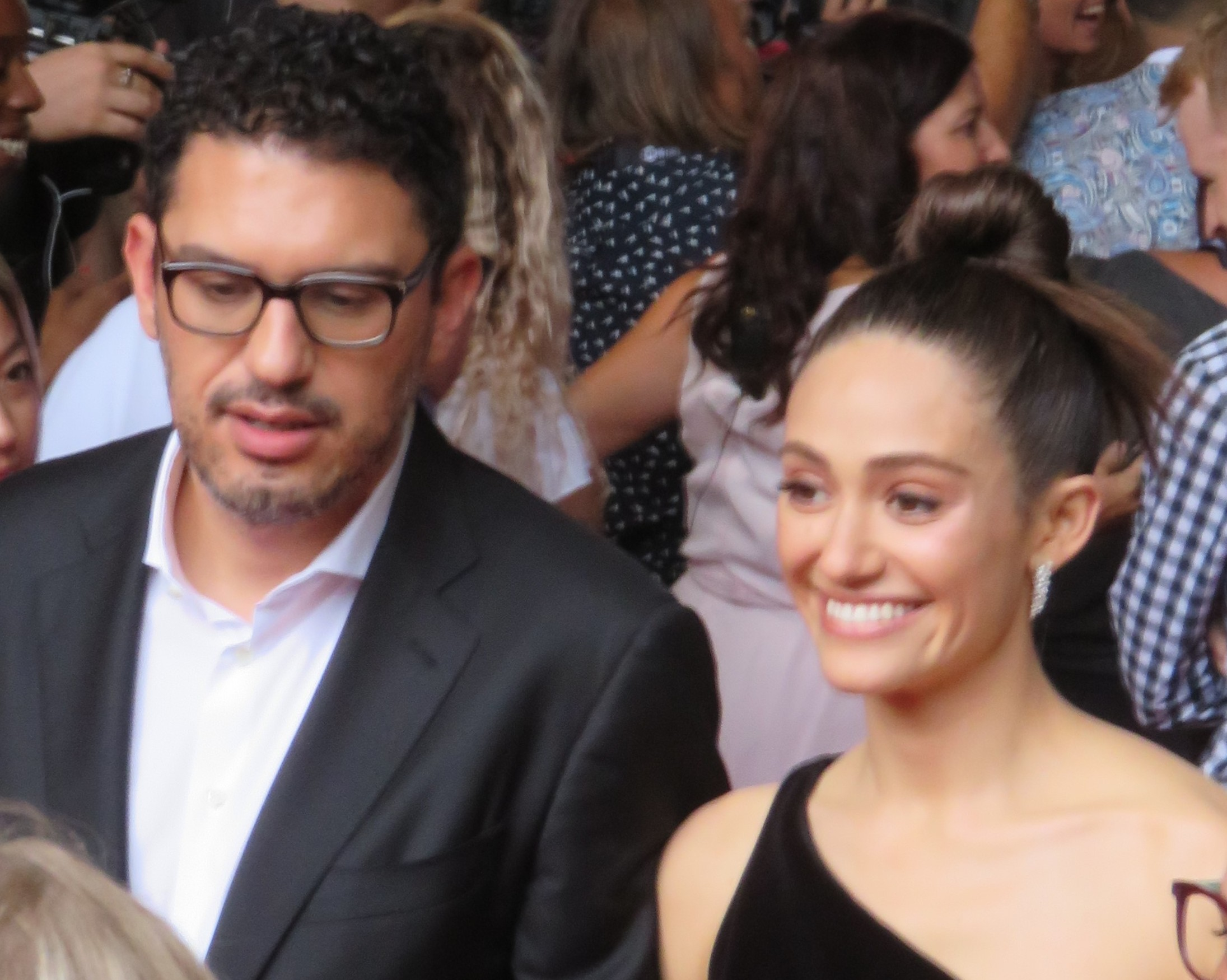
Rossum and her husband Sam Esmail in September 2018

Rossum married Justin Siegel in February 2008, though neither made any public comment about their marital status. Nineteen months later, in September 2009, he filed for divorce, citing irreconcilable differences. The divorce was finalized on December 28, 2010.

Rossum dated musician Adam Duritz from 2009 to 2010.

In 2013, Rossum began dating writer/director Sam Esmail. They got engaged two years later, in August 2015. They married on May 29, 2017, at the Central Synagogue in New York City. The couple have two children: a daughter, born May 2021, and a son, born April 2023.

Rossum has celiac disease and predominantly hyperactive ADHD and has been on medication for the latter since childhood.

The designer Vera Wang was married to Rossum's cousin, investor and real-estate developer Arthur P. Becker from 1989 to 2012.

Rossum has described herself as "a spiritual person, but not especially religious."

== Acting credits ==
=== Film ===
Year	Title	Role	Notes
1999	Genius	Claire Addison	
2000	Songcatcher	Deladis Slocumb	
2000	It Had to Be You	Young Girl	
2001	An American Rhapsody	Sheila – age 15	
2001	Happy Now?	Nicky Trent / Jenny Thomas	
2002	Passionada	Vicky Amonte	
2003	Nola	Nola	
2003	Mystic River	Katie Markum	
2004	The Day After Tomorrow	Laura Chapman	
2004	The Phantom of the Opera	Christine Daaé	
2006	Poseidon	Jennifer Ramsey	
2009	Dragonball Evolution	Bulma	
2009	Dare	Alexa Walker	
2011	Inside	Christina Perasso	
2013	Beautiful Creatures	Ridley Duchannes	
2014	Before I Disappear	Maggie	
2014	Comet	Kimberly	Also executive producer
2014	You're Not You	Bec	
2018	A Futile and Stupid Gesture	Kathryn Walker	
2018	That's Harassment	Journalist	Short film
2019	Cold Pursuit	Kim Dash	
TBA	Rubber Hut		Post-production

=== Television ===
Year	Title	Role	Notes	Ref.
1997	Law & Order	Alison Martin	Episode: "Ritual"	
1998	As the World Turns	Abigail Williams	Episode air date January 2, 1998	
1998	A Will of Their Own	Young Sarah	Episode: "Episode One"	
1998	Only Love	Lily	Television film	
1998	Grace & Glorie	Luanne	Television film	
1999	Snoops	Caroline Beels	Episodes: "Separation Anxiety" and "Blood Lines"	
1999	Genius	Claire Addison	Television film	
2000	The Audrey Hepburn Story	Young Audrey Hepburn	Television film	
2001	The Practice	Allison Ellison	Episode: "The Candidate"	
2008	I Love the New Millennium	Herself	Reality series, 3 episodes	
2011–2019	Shameless	Fiona Gallagher	Main role (seasons 1–9), 110 episodes Director, episodes: "I Am a Storm" and "Frank's Northern Shuttle Express"	
2017	Animal Kingdom	—N/a	Director, episode: "Broken Boards"	
2019	Mr. Robot	Carol Singer	Episode: "401 Unauthorized"; uncredited	
2019	Modern Love	—N/a	Director, episode: "So He Looked Like Dad. It Was Just Dinner, Right?"	
2022	Angelyne	Angelyne	Miniseries, 5 episodes; also executive producer	
2023	The Crowded Room	Candy Sullivan	Miniseries, 9 episodes	
2026–present	Furious	Alice Black	Main role; also executive producer	

=== Theater ===
Year	Title	Role	Playwright	Venue	Ref.
2006	Romeo and Juliet	Juliet	William Shakespeare	Williamstown Theatre Festival	
2009	24 Hour Plays	Emmy	Various	American Airlines Theater, Broadway	
2024	Walden	Stella	Amy Berryman	Tony Kiser Theater, Off-Broadway	

== Awards and nominations ==
Association	Year	Category	Work	Result	Ref.
Catalina Film Festival	2014	Avalon Award	You're Not You	Won	
Critics' Choice Awards	2005	Best Young Actress	The Phantom of the Opera	Won	
Critics' Choice Awards	2012	Best Actress in a Drama Series	Shameless	Nominated	
Critics' Choice Awards	2014	Best Actress in a Comedy Series	Shameless	Nominated	
Film Independent Spirit Awards	2001	Best Debut Performance	Songcatcher	Nominated	
Golden Globes	2005	Best Actress in a Motion Picture – Musical or Comedy	The Phantom of the Opera	Nominated	
Hamptons Film Festival	2009	Breakthrough Performer	—	Won	
MTV Movie & TV Awards	2005	Breakthrough Female Performance	The Day After Tomorrow	Nominated	
National Board of Review Awards	2005	Breakthrough Performance – Actress	The Phantom of the Opera	Won	
Northeast Film Festival	2014	Best Supporting Actress in a Feature Film	Before I Disappear	Won	
Online Film Critics Society Awards	2005	Breakthrough Performer	The Phantom of the Opera	Nominated	
People's Choice Awards	2016	Favorite Premium Cable TV Actress	Shameless	Nominated	
Satellite Awards	2005	Best Actress in a Motion Picture – Musical or Comedy	The Phantom of the Opera	Nominated	
Satellite Awards	2015	Best Actress in a Series – Musical or Comedy	Shameless	Nominated	
Saturn Awards	2005	Best Performance by a Younger Actor	The Phantom of the Opera	Won	
SCAD Savannah Film Festival	2026	Outstanding Achievement in Television Award	—	Won	
Shorty Awards	2019	Best Actor	—	Nominated	
Young Artist Awards	2000	Best Supporting Young Actress in a TV Movie or Pilot	Genius	Nominated	
Young Artist Awards	2005	Best Leading Young Actress in a Feature Film	The Phantom of the Opera	Won	
Young Hollywood Awards	2014	Fan Favorite Actor – Female	—	Nominated	
Young Hollywood Awards	2014	You're So Fancy	—	Nominated	

== Discography ==
=== Albums / EPs ===
Title	Album details	Peak chart positions		
Title	Album details	US	US Jazz	US New Age
Inside Out	Release date: October 23, 2007; Label: Geffen Records; Formats: CD, digital download	199	—	2
Carol of the Bells (EP)	Release date: November 27, 2007; Label: Geffen Records; Formats: CD, digital download	—	—	—
Sentimental Journey	Release date: January 29, 2013; Label: Warner Bros. Records; Formats: CD, digital download	92	1	—
"—" denotes releases that did not chart

=== Singles ===
Year	Title	Peak chart positions	Album
Year	Title	CAN Digital	Album
2007	"Slow Me Down"	37	Inside Out
2012	"Pretty Paper"	—	Sentimental Journey

=== Soundtrack appearances ===
Title	Year	Other artist(s)	Album
"Think of Me"	2004	Patrick Wilson	The Phantom of the Opera
"Angel of Music"	2004	Jennifer Ellison and Gerard Butler	The Phantom of the Opera
"The Mirror (Angel of Music)"	2004	Gerard Butler	The Phantom of the Opera
"The Phantom of the Opera"	2004	Gerard Butler	The Phantom of the Opera
"I Remember/Stranger Than You Dreamt It"	2004	Gerard Butler	The Phantom of the Opera
"Prima Donna"	2004	Ciarán Hinds, Simon Callow, Margaret Preece, Miranda Richardson, Victor McGuire, Jennifer Ellison and Patrick Wilson	The Phantom of the Opera
"Poor Fool, He Makes Me Laugh/Il Muto"	2004	Ciarán Hinds, Simon Callow, Margaret Preece, Victor McGuire, Gerard Butler, Jennifer Ellison and Kevin McNally	The Phantom of the Opera
"Why Have You Brought Me Here/Raoul I've Been There"	2004	Patrick Wilson	The Phantom of the Opera
"All I Ask of You"	2004	Patrick Wilson	The Phantom of the Opera
"All I Ask of You (Reprise)"	2004	Gerard Butler and Patrick Wilson	The Phantom of the Opera
"Masquerade/Why So Silent"	2004	Ciarán Hinds, Simon Callow, Margaret Preece, Victor McGuire, Jennifer Ellison, Miranda Richardson, Patrick Wilson and Gerard Butler	The Phantom of the Opera
"Journey to the Cemetery"	2004		The Phantom of the Opera
"Wishing You Were Somehow Here Again"	2004		The Phantom of the Opera
"Wandering Child"	2004	Gerard Butler	The Phantom of the Opera
"The Swordfight"	2004	Gerard Butler and Patrick Wilson	The Phantom of the Opera
"We Have All Been Blind"	2004	Gerard Butler and Patrick Wilson	The Phantom of the Opera
"Don Juan"	2004	Victor McGuire and Gerard Butler	The Phantom of the Opera
"The Point of No Return/Chandelier Crash"	2004	Gerard Butler	The Phantom of the Opera
"Down Once More/Track Down This Murderer"	2004	Gerard Butler and Patrick Wilson	The Phantom of the Opera

=== Music videos ===
Year	Title	Director
2007	"Slow Me Down"	Thomas Kloss
2007	"The Great Divide"	
2007	"Inside Out"	
2007	"Stay"	
2007	"Falling"	Adam Egypt Mortimer
