= Will Speck and Josh Gordon =

American director and producer duo

- Born: Will Speck; August 7, 1970 (age 56); New York City, New York, U.S.
- Occupations: Directors; producers; screenwriters
- Years active: 1997–present

Will Speck (born August 7, 1970) and Josh Gordon are an American filmmaker duo who generally work in the comedy genre. They have directed six feature films together. Their accolades include an Academy Award nomination.

Speck and Gordon met while attending the New York University Tisch School of the Arts. Their short film Culture (1997) was nominated for the Academy Award for Best Live Action Short Film. They directed their first feature film, Blades of Glory, in 2007. Their works include the movies The Switch (2010), The Power Inside (2013), Office Christmas Party (2016), Lyle, Lyle, Crocodile (2022), and Long Distance (2024), and the television shows Cavemen (2007) and Hit-Monkey (2021).

== Career ==
Will Speck and Josh Gordon met when they were paired for a group assignment at the New York University Tisch School of the Arts. They became friends and wrote screenplays together in Los Angeles in 1994. Gordon joined the writing staff of the sitcom Mad About You and Speck worked with Fox 2000 Pictures as a creative executive. They wrote and directed the short films Angry Boys and Culture in 1997. Culture starred Philip Seymour Hoffman and earned Best Narrative Short Film at the Chicago International Film Festival and an Academy Award nomination for Best Live Action Short Film. Gordon said the two shorts were "the first times we expressed our sensibility on film."

Speck and Gordon made their feature directorial debut in 2007 with the comedy Blades of Glory, starring Will Ferrell, Jon Heder, Will Arnett, and Amy Poehler. It was both a critical and commercial success, earning over $145 million at the box office. Also in 2007, they worked on the sitcom Cavemen as writers, directors, and executive producers. The distributor ABC struggled to promote the series, and it received mixed reviews; the Chicago Tribune called it one of the worst television shows ever made. In 2010, Speck and Gordon directed Jennifer Aniston and Jason Bateman in the romantic comedy film The Switch; it was met with mixed reviews, particularly for its screenplay. In 2013, they directed the interactive social film The Power Inside, which was nominated for the Daytime Emmy Award for Outstanding New Approaches in a Drama Series.

Speck and Gordon also directed hundreds of commercials. Their most notable ones are the GEICO Cavemen campaign ("So easy, a caveman could it do") that inspired the show Cavemen, a "Make Homosexuals Marry" commercial with Justin Long and Mike White, and an advertisement promoting organ donation, titled "World's Biggest Asshole", starring Thomas Jane and the voice of Arnett. Forbes magazine listed "World's Biggest Asshole" as one of the best advertisements of 2016. At the Cannes Lions International Festival of Creativity, the commercial's sponsor was awarded ten Golden Lions (three golds, two silvers, and five bronzes). In 2016, Speck and Gordon directed two episodes of the series Flaked, starring Arnett, and the movie Office Christmas Party, starring Aniston and Bateman. In 2021, their animated television series Hit-Monkey, based on the Marvel Comics character, was released on Hulu. Their next work, the musical film Lyle, Lyle, Crocodile based on the children's book and starring Shawn Mendes, was released in 2022. Their latest project was the science fiction movie Long Distance, which wrapped filming in 2020 and was released in 2024.

== Future and unrealized projects ==
Speck and Gordon were reported to direct many movies which were either canceled or in development hell. They include the movies I Want to ______ Your Sister (announced in 2008; abandoned by 2019), The Pool (announced in 2011), Parents Weekend (announced in 2015), The Travelers (announced in 2017), and War Driver (announced in 2020). As of May 2021, Variety Insight reports The Pool, The Travelers, and War Driver have been canceled.

In October 2022, it was announced they would direct and produce a musical adaptation of the video game The Oregon Trail.

== Filmography ==
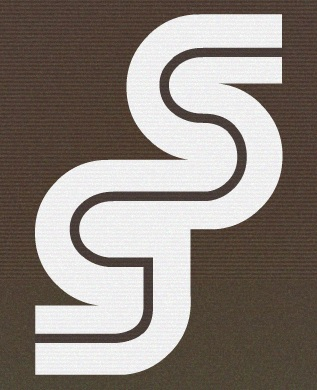
Official logo from the "Speck & Gordon" website

Short film

| Year | Title | Directors | Writers | Ref. |
|---|---|---|---|---|
| 1997 | Angry Boy | Yes | No | |
| 1997 | Culture | Yes | Yes | |

Feature film

| Year | Title | Directors | Producers | Ref(s) |
|---|---|---|---|---|
| 2007 | Blades of Glory | Yes | No | |
| 2010 | The Switch | Yes | No | |
| 2013 | The Power Inside | Yes | Executive | |
| 2016 | Office Christmas Party | Yes | Executive | |
| 2022 | Lyle, Lyle, Crocodile | Yes | Yes | |
| 2024 | Long Distance | Yes | Executive | |

=== Television ===
| Year | Title | Directors | Writers | Executive Producers | Notes | Ref(s) |
|---|---|---|---|---|---|---|
| 2007 | Cavemen | Yes | Yes | Yes | Also developers with Joe Lawson Episodes Directed: "Pilot", "The Mascot", "Nick Jerk, Andy Work"; Written and produced: "Nick Get Job", "The Cavewoman"; Written, directed, and produced: "Her Embarrassed of Caveman" | |
| 2016 | Flaked | Yes | No | No | Episodes "Rose" and "Palms" | |
| 2021–present | Hit-Monkey | No | Yes | Yes | Also creators | |
| 2025 | Side Quest | Yes | No | No | Episode "The Last Raid" | |

Key
| † | Denotes projects that have not yet been released |
