= The Power Inside =

- Directed by: Will Speck and Josh Gordon
- Written by: Matthew Robinson
- Produced by: Furlined/Lovechild
- Starring: Harvey Keitel; Analeigh Tipton; Craig Roberts
- Cinematography: Jo Willems
- Edited by: Rick Pearson
- Music by: Elias Arts
- Production company: Intel/Toshiba
- Distributed by: Pereira & O'dell
- Release date: August 14, 2013
- Country: United States
- Language: English

The Power Inside is a 2013 comedy social film developed by Intel and Toshiba. It is Intel and Toshiba's third social film after The Beauty Inside (2012) and Inside (2011). Directed by Will Speck and Josh Gordon and starring Harvey Keitel, Analeigh Tipton, and Craig Roberts, the film is broken up into six filmed episodes interspersed with interactive storytelling that all takes place on the main character's Facebook timeline.

== Plot ==
Neil, a seemingly normal 20-something, is stuck in a dead-end job and going nowhere in life. Everything changes when a race of planet-destroying moustache aliens needs something inside Neil to help them destroy Earth. Audience members participate by auditioning to join the aliens or the Guardians — a group of highly skilled straight razor-wielding barbers. The story unfolds online, with added content and character interactions on Facebook happening in between episodes.

== Cast ==
- Harvey Keitel as O’Mansky
- Analeigh Tipton as Ashley
- Craig Roberts as Neil
- Reid Ewing as Devin
- Zack Pearlman as Ari
