= U.S. Summit Company =

American multinational corporation

U.S. Summit Company LP
- Formerly: Summit Industrial Corporation
- Type: Privately held company
- Industry: Chemical
- Predecessor: U.S. Summit Corporation
- Founded: 1948; 78 years ago
- Founders: PM Yen, JT Shaw, Cheng Ching Wang
- Headquarters: Pound Ridge, New York, United States
- Area served: Asia
- Key people: Kenneth Wang (President)
- Services: Advice Chemical and consumer goods companies on operating from Asia
- Number of employees: Approx. 30 (2024)
- Website: ussummit.com

The U.S. Summit Company is an American multinational corporation that operates in the advisory space of industrial chemicals and consumer goods companies through throughout Asia.

The firm was founded in 1948 by four university classmates and is headquartered in Pound Ridge, New York.

The current President is Kenneth Wang, the son of the company's co-founder Cheng Ching Wang and brother of fashion designer Vera Wang. He is also the developer and owner of the Pound Ridge Golf Club and serves as a life member of Massachusetts Institute of Technology's governing board of trustees, the MIT Corporation.

== History ==
In 1947, PM Yen, JT Shaw, Cheng Ching Wang and later C.D. Shiah founded Summit Industrial Corporation. In 1948, the U.S. Summit Corporation was founded, the prior iteration of the current firm. The four founders were classmates at the Massachusetts Institute of Technology, choosing to name their company "Summit," representing the sum of MIT classmates.

The company formerly operated an oil refinery in Bangchak, Thailand and gas stations throughout the country. In 1965, Summit expanded its lease of the Bangchak refinery to produce 20,000 barrels of oil per day. In 1981, at the end of the contract, the Thai government took control of the operations back under the Ministry of Defense. During this time, Summit was responsible for approximately 6% of the liquefied petroleum gas market in Thailand.

Over its history, the company has been involved in the crude oil, pharmaceutical, computer, packaged food, and electronics industries covering partnerships with Motorola, General Motors, British Petroleum, and Caltex. At one time, Summit operated out of offices in Taiwan, Hong Kong, Bangkok, Kuala Lumpur, Okinawa, Singapore, Hanoi, Tokyo, and Bermuda. In addition, beginning in 1990, Cheng Ching Wang served as the sole funding source and Chairman of the Vera Wang Company.

Today, the company continues to consult with and advise companies seeking to expand operations primarily in Southeast Asia.

== Pureen ==
Summit provides consulting and management services in Southeast Asia under multiple businesses including the Pureen brand of maternity and baby products. Per a Euromonitor International Report, Pureen had a 41.9% market share of the baby tissue market in Malaysia in 2018.
