= Murmur (company) =

Murmur is a hybrid studio/technology company that creates and distributes social films. It was formed in 2010 by producer Mike Knowlton and writer/director Hal Siegel.

Murmur released its first film, Him, Her and Them in April 2011. As the first ever social film, it was distributed as a Facebook application. The film blends conventional visual formats like video and photography with social media capabilities such as comments and utilization Facebook's friend and profile picture functionalities. Murmur's next project is currently in development. Knowlton says that "It takes the idea of social mechanics, of loops, a step further."

Both Knowlton and Siegel are published on the topic of social media mechanics. Knowlton has been featured on Tribeca Film's Future of Film blog and Siegel has been featured twice on Ted Hope's Indiewire blog, Hope for Film.
