= Sentimental Journey (Emmy Rossum album) =

Studio album by Emmy Rossum
- Released: January 29, 2013
- Recorded: Los Angeles
- Genre: Traditional pop, vocal
- Length: 42:37
- Label: Warner Bros. Records
- Producer: Stuart Brawley

Emmy Rossum chronology
Inside Out (2007)	Sentimental Journey (2013)

Singles from Sentimental Journey
- 1. "Pretty Paper" Released: November 27, 2012

Professional ratings
Review scores
Source	Rating
Allmusic	3.5/5 stars

Sentimental Journey is the second studio album by American actress and singer Emmy Rossum. Released in 2013, it represented a departure in both sound and style from her previous album, 2007's New Age-inspired Inside Out. While the last release's material was almost entirely original, with Rossum even co-writing the majority of the songs, Sentimental Journey is composed of covers of traditional pop standards, all originally written between the 1920s and the 1960s and considered to be part of the Great American Songbook. It was also designed as a loose concept album about the passage of time, with each of the first 12 songs corresponding to a month in the Gregorian calendar.

Sentimental Journey features many of the same people who worked on her first album, including producer Stuart Brawley and musician Joe Corcoran. "Pretty Paper" was the first single from the album and was released as a digital single on November 27, 2012. Rather than traditional music videos, "vignettes" were filmed and released to promote the album that featured Rossum in costumes and settings from various periods of the early 20th century.

Rossum promoted the album by performing "These Foolish Things (Remind Me of You)" on The View and on Entertainment Tonight. Other media appearances in support of the album included performances on Access Hollywood on January 25, Conan on January 28, Chelsea Lately on January 29, and The Late Late Show with Craig Ferguson on February 6.

== Track listing ==
No.	Title	Writer(s)	Length
1.	"Sentimental Journey"	Les Brown; Bud Green; Benjamin Homer	3:51
2.	"The Object of My Affection"	Jimmie Grier; Pinky Tomlin; Coy Poe	3:26
3.	"I'm Looking Over A Four Leaf Clover"	Mort Dixon; Harry M. Woods	2:19
4.	"These Foolish Things (Remind Me of You)"	Jack Strachey; Eric Maschwitz	4:09
5.	"I'll Be With You in Apple Blossom Time"	Neville Fleeson; Albert Von Tilzer	3:24
6.	"Summer Wind"	Henry Mayer; Johnny Mercer; Hans Bradtke	3:13
7.	"Many Tears Ago"	Winfield Scott	2:16
8.	"All I Do Is Dream of You"	Nacio Herb Brown; Arthur Freed	3:16
9.	"Nobody Knows You When You're Down And Out"	Jimmy Cox	3:18
10.	"Autumn Leaves (Les Feuilles Mortes)"	Johnny Mercer; Jacques Prévert; Joseph Kosma	4:20
11.	"Things"	Bobby Darin	3:04
12.	"Pretty Paper"	Willie Nelson	3:43
13.	"Keep Young And Beautiful" (Bonus Track)	Al Dubin; Harry Warren	1:28
Total length:			41:47

== Personnel ==
- Emmy Rossum — Vocals
- Stuart Brawley — Producer, mixer, melodica, organ, bells, percussion
- Joe Corcoran — Acoustic guitar, electric guitar, banjo, percussion
- Giulio Carmassi — Arranger, Melodica, horns, piano, organ, vibraphone
- Nikki Garcia — Violin
- Cameron Stone — Cello
- Matt Mayhall — Drums, percussion
- Sam Jones — Photography

Engineered by Drew Harris, Giulio Carmassi, and Stuart Brawley. Recorded at The Backyard Recording Studios and The Village Recorder.

== Chart positions ==
=== Album ===
Chart (2013)	Peak Position
US Billboard 200	92
