= Inside Out (Emmy Rossum album) =

Studio album by Emmy Rossum
- Released: October 23, 2007
- Recorded: Los Angeles
- Genre: Dream pop, new-age
- Length: 48:08
- Label: Geffen
- Producer: Stuart Brawley

Emmy Rossum chronology
Inside Out (2007)	Sentimental Journey (2013)

Singles from Inside Out
- 1. "Slow Me Down" Released: 2008

Professional ratings
Review scores
Source	Rating
Allmusic	3.5/5 stars

Inside Out is the debut studio album by American actress and singer Emmy Rossum, released on October 23, 2007. In the second week of its release the album entered the U.S. Billboard 200 at number 199. Rossum contributed significantly to her debut release, even co-writing all of the original songs, with the one exception being "Rainy Days and Mondays", a cover of the Carpenters' 1971 original. The cover and album photos were shot at Pier 54 in Santa Monica by photographer Brian Bowen Smith.

As of May 11, 2008, the album had sold 28,090 copies in the US. Though the album only spent one week on the Billboard 200, it spent 55 weeks on the Billboard Top New Age Albums chart and 8 weeks on the Heatseekers chart. Lead single "Slow Me Down" missed the Billboard Hot 100, but spent 72 weeks on the New Age Digital Songs chart and 2 weeks on the Hot Canadian Digital Singles chart. Inside Out was the 7th best-selling New Age album and Emmy Rossum was the 4th best-selling New Age artist of 2008.

Producer Stuart Brawley received a 2009 Juno award nomination for his work on the album.

== Inside Out - EP ==
On July 31, three songs and a 17:56-seconds making-of documentary (filmed by documentary filmmaker Doug Biro) were released on iTunes under the name "Inside Out - EP." As of August 4, it was the 8th top album overall and the 2nd top pop album.

Those songs are:

1. "Slow Me Down" 2:34
2. "Stay" 3:15
3. "Falling" 3:40
4. "Inside Out Documentary (Long Version)" 17:56 video.

== Track listing ==
All tracks are written by Emmy Rossum and Stuart Brawley, unless stated otherwise.

No.	Title	Writer(s)	Length
1.	"Slow Me Down"	Emmy Rossum; Stuart Brawley; Bridget Benenate	2:34
2.	"Inside Out"		3:23
3.	"Stay"		3:14
4.	"Falling"		4:03
5.	"The Great Divide"		6:53
6.	"Lullaby"	Rossum; Brawley; Vince Pizzinga	4:54
7.	"Don't Stop Now"	Rossum; Brawley; Pizzinga	5:44
8.	"High"	Rossum; Brawley; Michelle Lewis	3:59
9.	"A Million Pieces"		4:53
10.	"Rainy Days and Mondays"	Paul Williams; Roger Nichols	3:42
11.	"Anymore"	Rossum; Brawley; Pizzinga	4:49
Total length:			48:08

iTunes Bonus Track
No.	Title	Length
12.	"Been Too Long"	3:46

== Music videos ==
- "Slow Me Down" (Directed by Thomas Kloss)
- "Falling" (Directed by Adam Egypt Mortimer)

== Personnel ==
- Emmy Rossum — Writer, Vocals
- Stuart Brawley — Producer, Writer, Mixer, Keyboards, Bass, Programming, String Arrangements, Synth
- Joe Corcoran — Engineer, Digital Editing, Guitar, Programming
- Abe Laboriel, Jr. — Drums
- Sean Hurley — Bass

== Chart positions ==
=== Album ===
Chart (2007)	Peak Position
US Billboard 200	199
US Billboard Top New Age Albums	2
US Billboard Top Heatseekers	3
US Billboard Top Digital Albums	15

=== Singles ===
Year	Single	Chart	Peak position
2007	"Slow Me Down"	Hot Canadian Digital Singles	#37
2007	"Slow Me Down"	New Age Digital Songs	#9

=== Year-end charts ===
Chart (2008)	Position
Billboard Top New Age Albums Chart	7
