= Lyle, Lyle, Crocodile =

American children's picture book published in 1965

- Second edition
- Author: Bernard Waber
- Publication date: 1965
- Pages: 48 pp.
- ISBN: 978-0395199701
- Preceded by: The House on East 88th Street

Lyle, Lyle, Crocodile is a children's book written by Bernard Waber first published in 1965. It is the sequel to The House on East 88th Street, published in 1962.

The book is the second in the Lyle the Crocodile series, which follows the life of Lyle, a city-dwelling crocodile who lives in a Victorian brownstone with the Primms family.

== Plotline ==
The story begins with Lyle and Mrs. Primm going shopping and running into their neighbor, Mr. Grumps. The grouchy Mr. Grumps finds Lyle a nuisance because Lyle scares his cat, Loretta, and Mr. Grumps has him thrown in the zoo. When Lyle is freed by his old performing partner Mr. Valenti, they go back to the house on 88th Street, where they find Mr. Grumps' house on fire. Lyle rescues Mr. Grumps and Loretta, is declared a hero, and thus is allowed to stay with the Primms, and is warmly accepted by Mr. Grumps and Loretta.

== Adaptations ==
An animated musical adaptation of Lyle, Lyle, Crocodile aired on HBO on November 18, 1987. The special is also a part of the HBO Storybook Musicals lineup.

A live-action/animated feature film adaptation was released on October 7, 2022, by Sony Pictures and is directed by Will Speck and Josh Gordon. Like the animated special, it is a musical, with original songs written for this film by the songwriting team of Pasek and Paul, who also served as executive producers. Canadian singer Shawn Mendes voices Lyle who cannot talk but can sing.
