= Vera Wang =

American fashion designer (born 1949)

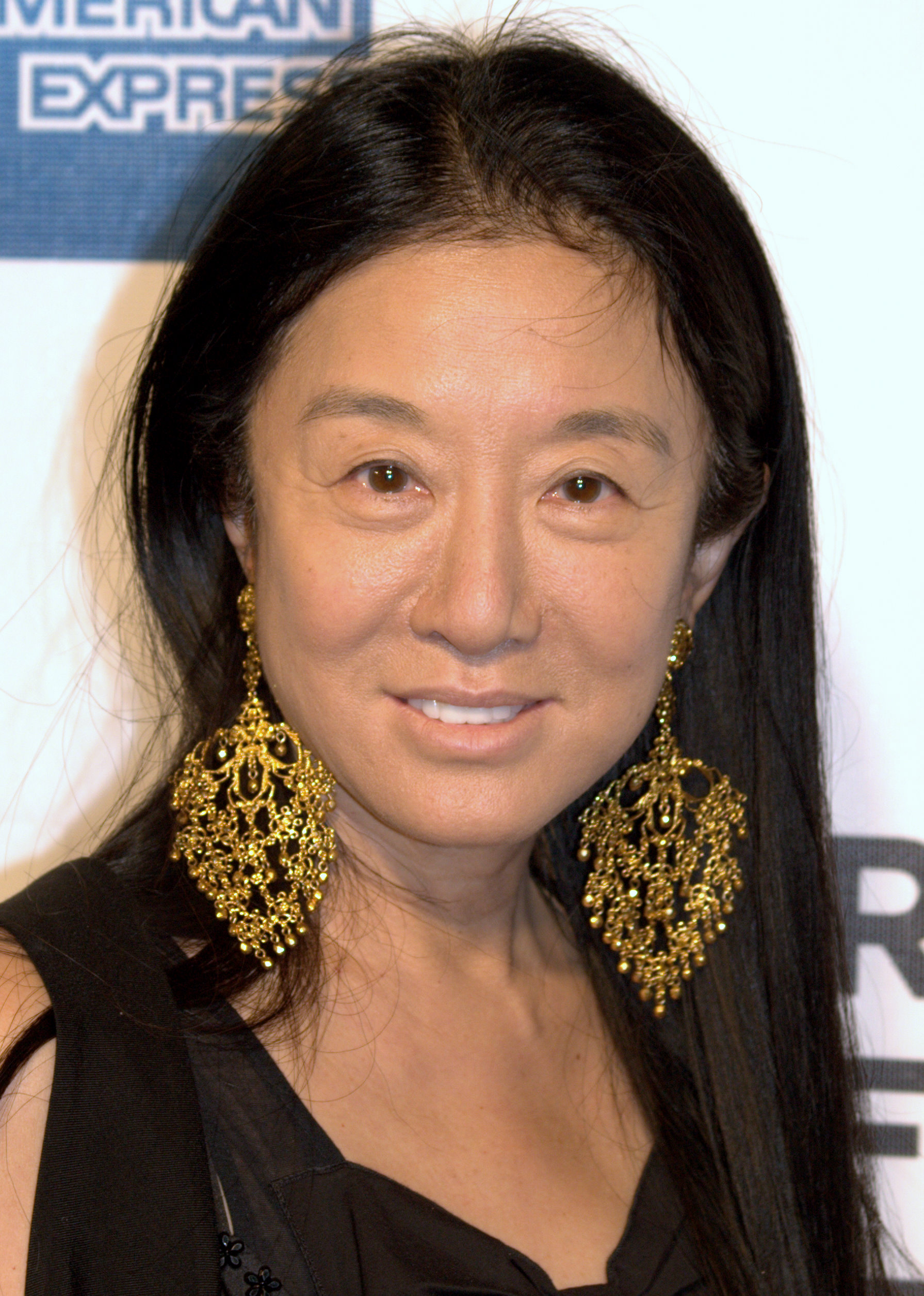
- Wang in 2009
- Born: Vera Ellen Wang; June 27, 1949 (age 77); New York City, U.S.
- Education: Sarah Lawrence College (BA)
- Occupation: Fashion designer
- Spouse: Arthur P. Becker (m. 1989; sep. 2012)
- Children: 2
- Relatives: Wu Peifu (great-grandfather)

Vera Ellen Wang (Chinese: 王薇薇; pinyin: Wáng Wēiwēi; born June 27, 1949) is an American fashion designer. Wang initially pursued a career in figure skating before transitioning to fashion. She got her start working for Vogue and Ralph Lauren before launching her own bridal gown boutique in 1990.

Wang has gained international recognition for her wedding gowns, which have been worn by numerous celebrities. She expanded her namesake brand to include ready-to-wear fashion, accessories, fragrances, and home goods. In 2024, Wang sold the brand to WHP Global.

== Early life ==
Vera Ellen Wang was born June 27, 1949, in New York City to Chinese parents who immigrated to the United States in the mid-1940s. Her mother, Florence Wu (Wu Chifang), was the daughter of the Fengtian Clique warlord Wu Junsheng and worked as a translator for the United Nations, while her father, Cheng Ching Wang (Wang Chengqing), a graduate of Yanjing University and MIT, owned a medicine company, and held the following positions: Director, Singapore Petroleum Company Pte. Ltd., Chairman & President, Oceanic Petroleum Corporation, Chairman & President, Oceanic Petroleum (Asia) Corporation, Chairman & President of Summit Group of Companies (now U.S. Summit Company), Chairman of the Vera Wang Group 1990-1998. Wang has one brother, Kenneth, who is a life member of MIT Corporation, a board of trustees that governs the Massachusetts Institute of Technology.

Wang grew up on Manhattan's Upper East Side. She began figure skating at the age of eight, training under Peter Dunfield and Sonya Klopfer in Denver during the summers and with the Skating Club of New York during the rest of the year. While in high school, she trained with pairs partner James Stuart, and competed at the 1968 U.S. Figure Skating Championships. She was featured in Sports Illustrated's Faces in the Crowd in the January 9, 1968 issue. Recalling her efforts to make the U.S. Olympics team, she said, "I was devastated when I did not qualify for the Olympic team." Then she entered the fashion industry. Wang continues to enjoy skating, saying it is “multidimensional.”

Wang attended Friends Seminary, graduated from Chapin School in 1967, attended the University of Paris, and earned a degree in art history from Sarah Lawrence College. In 2013, she was the keynote speaker at Sarah Lawrence’s 85th commencement ceremony.

In 1968, Wang was presented as a debutante to high society at the International Debutante Ball at the Waldorf Astoria New York.

== Career ==
Wang was hired to be an editor at Vogue upon graduation from Sarah Lawrence College, making her the youngest editor at that magazine. She stayed at Vogue for 17 years, leaving in 1987 to join Ralph Lauren, for whom she worked for two years. At 40, she resigned and became an independent bridal wear designer.

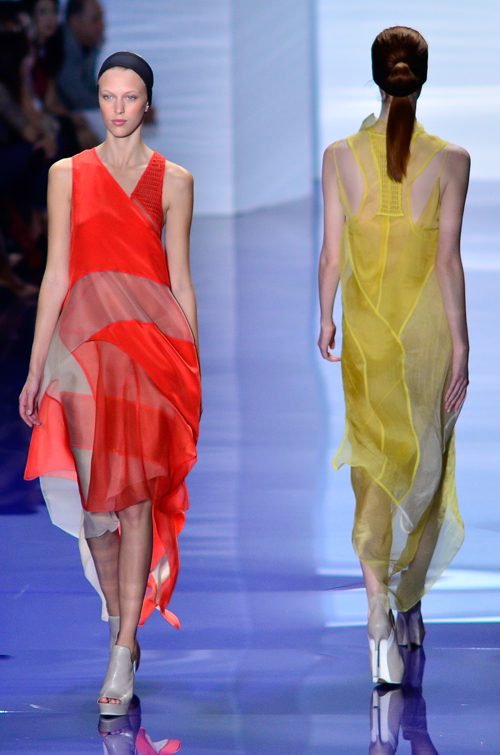
Vera Wang Spring-Summer 2014 runway show at New York Fashion Week

Wang has made wedding gowns for public figures such as Hayley Williams, Vanessa Hudgens, Chelsea Clinton, Karenna Gore, Ivanka Trump, Campbell Brown, Alicia Keys, Mariah Carey, Victoria Beckham, Sarah Michelle Gellar, Avril Lavigne, Hilary Duff, Khloe Kardashian, and Kim Kardashian. Wang started off as being best known for her elegant wedding dresses. Wang's evening wear has also been worn by Michelle Obama.

Figure skaters who have worn costumes designed by Wang at the Winter Olympic Games include Nancy Kerrigan (1992 and 1994), Michelle Kwan (1998 and 2002), Evan Lysacek (2010), and Nathan Chen (2018 and 2022). Wang was inducted into the U.S. Figure Skating Hall of Fame in 2009 for her contribution to the sport as a costume designer. She designed the uniforms worn by the Philadelphia Eagles Cheerleaders.

On October 23, 2001, her book Vera Wang on Weddings was released. In June 2005, she won the Council of Fashion Designers of America (CFDA) Womenswear Designer of the Year. On May 27, 2006, Wang was awarded the André Leon Talley Lifetime Achievement Award from the Savannah College of Art and Design.

Wang's evening wear has been worn by stars at many red carpet events, including Viola Davis at the 2012 Academy Awards, and Sofia Vergara at the 65th Emmy Awards.

She was awarded the Council of Fashion Designers of America Lifetime Achievement Award in 2013.

In 2006, Wang reached a deal with Kohl's, a chain of department stores, to produce a less expensive line of ready-to-wear clothing exclusively for them called Simply Vera.

Forbes placed her the 34th in the list America's Richest Self-Made Women 2018, her revenues rising to $630 million in that year.

On September 10, 2019, after a sabbatical of two years during which she had presented her collections only via films, Vera Wang returned to the New York Fashion Week runway for her Spring/Summer 2020 fashion show, which celebrated the 30th anniversary of her brand. The show received very positive reviews, with Godfrey Deeny describing it as a "notable collection by one of the few New York designers with a truly distinctive fashion DNA", while Bridget Foley presented Wang's creations as "Beautiful, seriously designed clothes, presented with gutsy panache". However, the show was marred by several major footwear malfunctions, especially during the finale when four models fell down, including Fei Fei Sun, who fell twice in a row, leading chief fashion critic Vanessa Friedman to state that "In 2019, no woman should be tortured by what she wears".

In December 2024, WHP Global, a brand management firm based in New York, announced an agreement to acquire the IP of the Vera Wang fashion brand. As part of the transaction, Wang agreed to continue in the role as Founder & Chief Creative Officer, joining WHP Global as a shareholder.

== Retail ==
In 1990, Wang opened her first design salon in the Carlyle Hotel in New York City that features her trademark bridal gowns. She has since opened bridal boutiques in New York, London, Tokyo, and Sydney and has also expanded her brand through her fragrance, jewelry, eyewear, shoes, and homeware collections.

"White by Vera Wang" launched on February 11, 2011, at David's Bridal. Prices of the bridal gowns range from $600 to $1,400. The partnership ended in 2020 when COVID briefly knocked the wind out of the bridal industry. In 2002, Wang began to enter the home fashion industry and launched The Vera Wang China and Crystal Collection, followed by the 2007 release of her diffusion line called Simply Vera, which are sold exclusively by Kohl's.

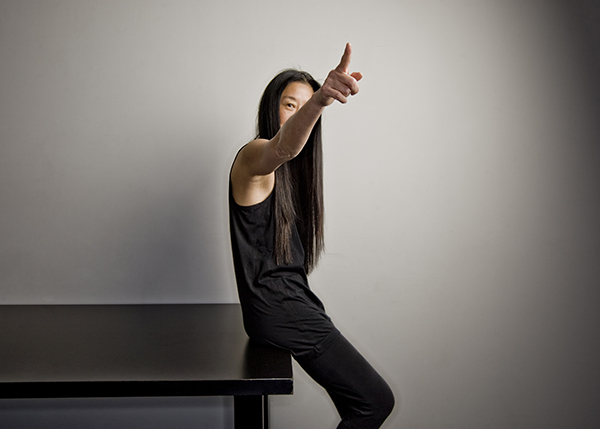
Wang in 2009

In spring 2012, Wang teamed up with Men's Wearhouse to offer two tuxedo styles available in both the retail and rental areas of their inventory. In June 2012, she expanded in Australia with the opening of "Vera Wang Bride Sydney" and her first Asian flagship store "Vera Wang Bridal Korea", helmed by President Jung Mi-ri, in upmarket neighborhood Cheongdam-dong in Gangnam-gu, Seoul.

In a 2013 interview with CBS, Wang described her transition from journalist to businesswoman as "painful, and not only that, I have no choice. So I think when you start there's a certain innocence because of that freedom, and as you evolve you begin to see the parameters of what you can and can't do. So I make decisions that are very tiny that will affect an hour of work, I make decisions that will impact the lives of the people that work for me. It's in fashion as well, micro work, a centimeter of proportion and then it's macro to see what a vision is on the red carpet."

== Business ==
=== Brand Expansion and Licensing ===
Vera Wang has expanded her namesake brand beyond custom couture through global licensing, retail collaborations, and regional manufacturing agreements.

==== Bridal and Apparel ====
In April 2021, Vera Wang signed a 10-year global licensing agreement with the Barcelona-based Pronovias Group to produce and distribute her Vera Wang Bride diffusion line. The inaugural collection debuted in September 2021 with 60 wedding gowns, followed by occasion wear, headpieces, and accessories in early 2022.

Following financial restructuring and a shift in ownership of Pronovias Group from BC Partners to Bain Capital and MV Credit in early 2023, the group refocused on its core European brands. In September 2025, midway through the original 10-year term, Pronovias transferred the manufacturing, wholesale, and global distribution rights for the Vera Wang Bride label to David's Bridal. David's Bridal, which had previously carried the White by Vera Wang line for over a decade, assumed full global operation of the brand, launching its inaugural collection under the deal in April 2026.

==== Regional Collaborations ====
In 2026, Vera Wang expanded her ready-to-wear offerings in Greater China through both direct distribution and designer collaborations. In addition to launching a dedicated regional ready-to-wear line on Tmall, Wang partnered with China-based designer incubator Fabrique for a limited-edition capsule collection featuring tailoring, outerwear, and contemporary separates.

In January 2026, Vera Wang announced a partnership with the Batra Group to launch a new ready-to-wear line tailored for the UK and European markets, expanding her brand beyond bridal and occasion wear in the region.

In May 2026, Vera Wang announced its first systematic ready-to-wear expansion for the Chinese market, debuting a China-exclusive ready-to-wear collection launched via its Tmall flagship store. The collection adapts the brand's signature monochrome aesthetic and couture tailoring into daily wear, covering categories for business commuting, social occasions, and formal wear, with plans for subsequent offline retail expansion in mainland China.

In August 2026, Vera Wang partnered with Chinese women's footwear brand Staccato to launch a dual footwear collection spanning bridal heels, evening pumps, platform loafers, and athletic sneakers.

==== Fragrances ====
Vera Wang entered the fragrance industry in 2002 with the release of her debut signature scent, Vera Wang for Women, created in partnership with Unilever Cosmetics International (UCI). In July 2005, global beauty conglomerate Coty Inc. acquired Unilever's prestige fragrance portfolio, assuming long-term licensing, manufacturing, and distribution rights for all Vera Wang fragrances.

In 2006, Coty and Wang introduced Vera Wang Princess, a fruity-floral fragrance targeted at a younger demographic that became one of the brand's core commercial pillars. The Princess franchise birthed several spin-off scents and flankers:

- Rock Princess: Originally launched in April 2009 as a dark fruity-floral variant of the original Princess fragrance. In April 2023, Coty and Wang officially relaunched Rock Princess with a modernized formulation, dark raspberry and jasmine notes, and updated studded packaging.

Additional major fragrance lines under the brand include:

- Lovestruck (2011): A romance-themed fragrance line fronted by actress Leighton Meester, which spawned flankers such as Lovestruck Floral Rush (2012) prior to the line being phased out of production.
- Vera Wang Embrace (2015): A body mist and fragrance collection developed for mass retail distribution.
- Vera Wang Love (2025): Released in May 2025, Vera Wang Love Eau de Parfum was introduced as a white floral and woody fragrance drawing inspiration from the designer's heritage in luxury bridal couture.

== Personal life ==
In June 1989, Wang married investor Arthur P. Becker in an interfaith Baptist and Jewish ceremony. They have two daughters, both of whom were adopted. In July 2012, the couple announced their separation.

== In popular culture ==
Several movies and television shows have featured Wang's works, including The West Wing, The Newsroom, Gossip Girl, Sex and the City, Revenge, The Simpsons, and the film Sex and the City.

Wang appeared in a cameo in season 5 episode 11 of the TV series Gossip Girl and as herself in the second season of Ugly Betty in episode 2.07.

== Filmography ==
=== Movies ===
- First Daughter (2004) as herself.
- The September Issue (2009) as herself.

=== Television ===
- Gossip Girl (2012) as herself.
- Keeping Up with the Kardashians (2011) as herself.
- Chelsea Lately (2011) as herself.
- The Celebrity Apprentice (2008) as herself.
- Ugly Betty (2007) as herself.

== Books ==
- Vera Wang, Vera Wang on Weddings, HarperCollins, October 2001 (ISBN 9780688162566).

== Recognition ==
She was recognized as one of the BBC's 100 women of 2021.

In 2023, she received the Board of Directors' Tribute at the 2023 CFDA Fashion Awards for her Bridal impact.

== See also ==
- List of fashion designers
