= Inside (2011 film) =

2011 American thriller film

- Film poster
- Directed by: D. J. Caruso
- Written by: D. J. Caruso
- Produced by: Jennifer Barrons; Jules Daly; Tracie Norfleet
- Starring: Emmy Rossum; Molly Hagan; Jake Abel
- Cinematography: Mauro Fiore
- Edited by: Josh Bodnar
- Music by: Brian Tyler
- Production companies: RSA Films; B-Reel
- Release date: 25 July 2011
- Running time: 52 minutes
- Country: United States
- Language: English

Inside is a 2011 American social horror thriller film brought to viewers through a partnership between Intel and Toshiba.

Directed and written by D. J. Caruso and starring Emmy Rossum, the experience is broken up into several segments across multiple social media platforms, including Facebook, YouTube, and Twitter. Viewers are challenged to help Rossum's character, Christina, to safely escape her predicament. The film bears some similarities to the non-social 2008 film Untraceable in that it involves kidnapping and an Internet audience as part of the plot.

The first in a series of episodes was released on the website on July 25, 2011 for those participating in the "real-time experience". The whole film became available for online viewing on September 6, 2011 on their website, though both the website and YouTube channel no longer exist.

== Plot ==
Twenty-four-year-old Christina Perasso, a tough, resilient girl, wakes up trapped in a room and has no idea where she is being held or who did this to her. She has been left access to her laptop. Through the use of an intermittent Wi-Fi signal, she reaches out to friends, family and an audience through social media. She lists facts, clues, pictures and videos to aid the audience in figuring out where she is, who her captor is, and why she was kidnapped.

== Cast ==
- Emmy Rossum as Christina Perasso
- Cooper Thornton as Federal Agent Stu MacArthur
- Molly Hagan as Mrs. Cathy Perasso
- Melissa Tang as Jennifer Myer
- Miranda Rae Mayo as Emma Hickox
- Jake Abel as Kirk Francis
- Hayley Chase as Lucca Scibird
- Xander Berkeley as H1ghway_man
