= The House on East 88th Street =

1962 children's book by Bernard Waber

- First edition
- Author: Bernard Waber
- Publication date: 1962
- Pages: 48 pp.
- ISBN: 978-0395199701
- Followed by: Lyle, Lyle, Crocodile

The House on East 88th Street is a children's book written by Bernard Waber first published in 1962.

The book is the first in the Lyle the Crocodile series. The story is about a family named the Primms who move into an old Victorian brownstone on the Upper East Side of Manhattan, only to find a performing crocodile named Lyle living in the bathtub. At first they are horrified, but they learn to love him and accept him into their family.

The book was followed by the sequel Lyle, Lyle, Crocodile in 1965. In 1987, The House on East 88th Street, as well with its 1965 sequel Lyle, Lyle Crocodile, were adapted into an animated musical TV special for HBO, animated and directed by Michael Sporn with music by Charles Strouse, titled Lyle, Lyle Crocodile: The Musical - The House on East 88th Street. Both books also served as the basis of the 2022 film Lyle, Lyle, Crocodile.
