= Social film =

A social film is a type of interactive film that is presented through the lens of social media. A social film is distributed digitally and integrates with a social networking service, such as Facebook or YouTube. It combines features of web video, social network games and social media.

== Key elements ==
Social films are a more recent phenomenon, and, in turn, there are few precedents for their format. Although there are not many examples of this genre of film, the medium has certain identifiable elements:

- Casual entertainment
- Social media
- User-generated content
- Game mechanics

Using just one of these factors or a combination of them, a social film engages viewers to interact directly with the work. This can be done through usual social media functionality like comments and ranking or adding directly to the narrative itself.

Just as with memes, social film distribution relies on the viral spread enabled by social media. This is based on the viral expansion loops model, in which a viewer benefits from sharing the application with friends, exponentially creating new viewers compelled to share the application.

== History ==
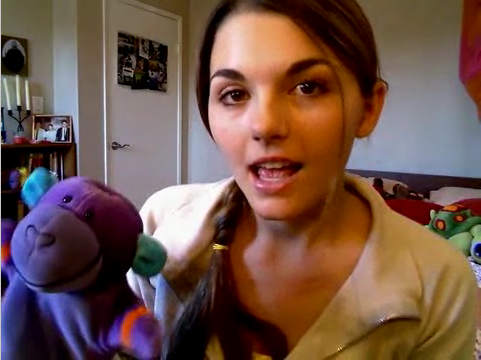
lonelygirl5, aka Jessica Lee Rose, always filmed in the same spot in the same room for every single video.

One of the first social films to be created was from the YouTube channel lonelygirl15. This social film started in 2006 and was created by Miles Beckett , Mesh Flinders, and Greg Goodfried. They used YouTube posts to create an interactive video series about a fictional character who showcased her life in a vlog format. As the videos went on, more bizarre things would keep happening to the main character, Bree, before she just stopped uploading. This channel was not only the first viral social film, but went on to be one of the first viral YouTube channels to be created.

It did take a few years to see any more films in this genre, but 2011 saw many people start to try their hand at making these films. The first social film in this year was a film called Him, Her and Them which was produced and released by Murmur in April 2011. It was distributed exclusively through Facebook and promoted as the first “Facebook film.” The film is composed of short video clips and interactive slideshows, integrating Facebook's Social Graph API. Users participate via text-based additions to the story, which are viewable only by friends within their social network.

In May 2011, Canon and Ron Howard teamed up to create Project Imagin8ion, which was a photo contest where photographers submitted photos and the top 8 photos would be the inspiration for a short film. This short film was called "When You Find Me" and could be found exclusively on YouTube.

In July 2011, Intel and Toshiba partnered together to create Hollywood's first Social Film experience, a thriller called Inside, directed by D.J. Caruso and starring Emmy Rossum. The project is broken up into several segments across multiple social media platforms including Facebook, YouTube, and Twitter. In this instance, the audience is challenged to help Emmy Rossum's character, Christina, safely make it out of the room she's been trapped in. This particular form of social film is a major undertaking in that it combines social media activity with A-list acting talent to create a user experience that all happens in real time.

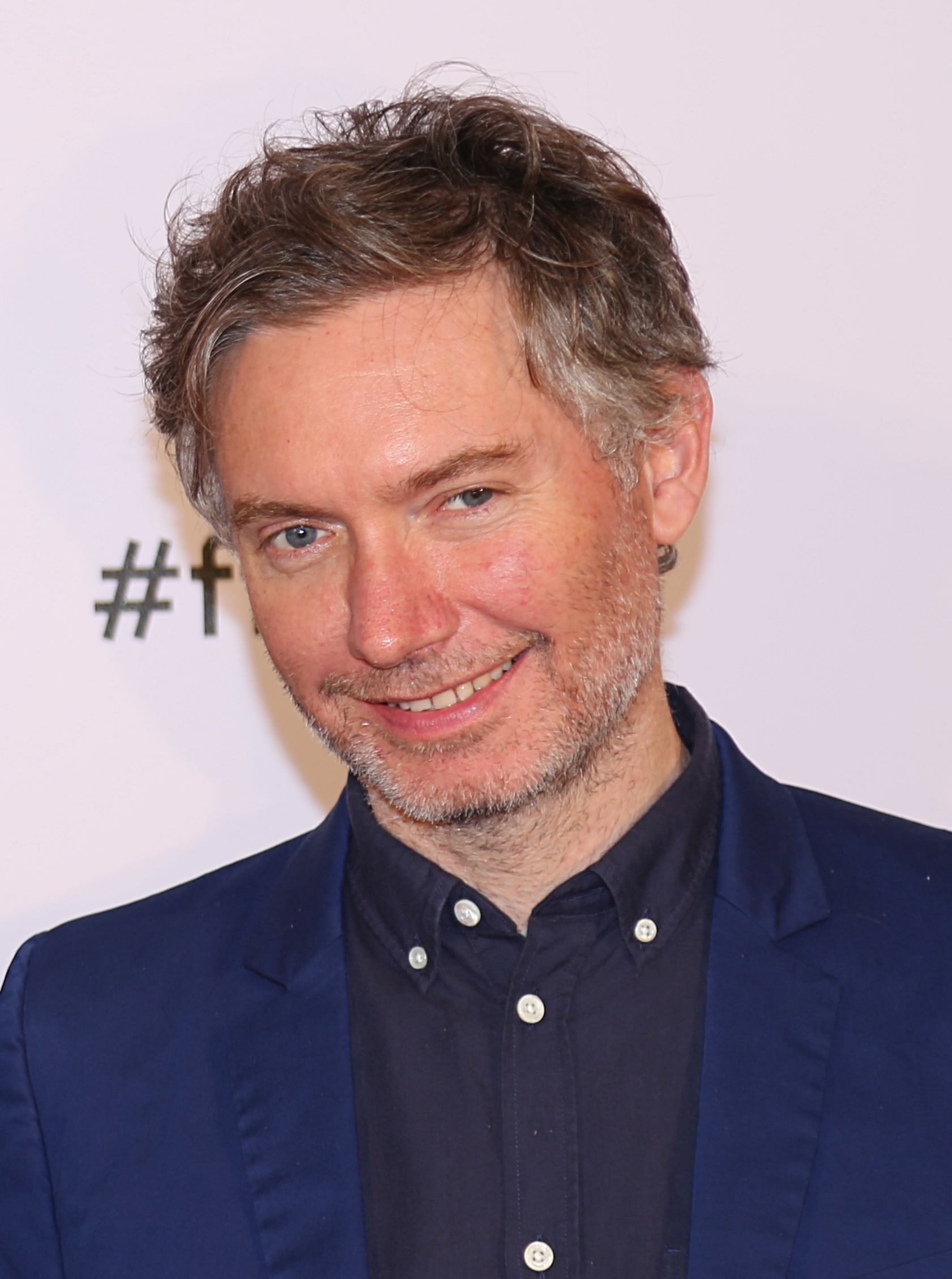
Kevin Macdonald, who had won an Academy Award in 1999 for his documentary "One Day In September" before moving on to direct other movies including "Life In A Day".

Although not quite the same idea, Hollywood also started experimenting with the idea of interactive and crowd-sourced films. One of the first examples of this was a short film called "Life In A Day" directed by Kevin Macdonald and produced by Ridley Scott. Kevin asked people from all over the world to submit videos onto YouTube of what they were doing on July 24th, 2010. They combined all of the best videos that were submitted together to create one film of people doing different things all around the world, no matter how boring or simple those things seemed. They took this short to film festivals before releasing it to the public on YouTube in 2011.

In August 2012, Intel and Toshiba partnered again to create The Beauty Inside, directed by Drake Doremus, starring Mary Elizabeth Winstead and Topher Grace. It's Hollywood's first social film that gives everyone in the audience a chance to play Alex, the lead role. The experience will be broken up into six filmed episodes interspersed with real-time interactive storytelling that all takes place on Alex's Facebook timeline.

In August 2013, Intel and Toshiba released their third entry into the category, The Power Inside, directed by Will Speck and Josh Gordon and starring Harvey Keitel, Analeigh Tipton, and Craig Roberts. It's Hollywood's first social film that asks the audience to audition to help save or destroy the world. The experience is broken up into six filmed episodes interspersed with user-generated content and interactive storytelling on the main character's Facebook timeline.

In 2015, Intel partnered with Dell for their fourth entry, What Lives Inside directed by Robert Stromberg and starring Colin Hanks, Catherine O'Hara, and J. K. Simmons. The first of four episodes was released on Hulu on March 25, 2015.
