= Bernard Waber =

American writer

- Born: September 27, 1921; Philadelphia, Pennsylvania, U.S.
- Died: May 16, 2013 (aged 91); Baldwin, New York, U.S.
- Education: Philadelphia College of Art, Pennsylvania Academy of Fine Arts
- Occupations: Illustrator, writer
- Spouse: Ethel Bernstein (d. 2006)
- Children: Paulis, Louisa and Gary Waber
- Writing career
- Period: 1954-2010
- Genres: Children's fiction, picture books
- Notable work: The Lyle series

Bernard Waber (September 27, 1921 – May 16, 2013) was an American children's author most famous for the books The House on East 88th Street (1962), Lyle, Lyle, Crocodile (1965) and the subsequent books in the Lyle series.

== Background ==
He was born in Philadelphia, Pennsylvania to Henry and Pauline Waber. Although he started a degree in finance at the University of Pennsylvania, he left school to enlist in the military at the onset of World War II. From 1942 to 1945, Waber served the United States Army as a staff sergeant. Immediately following the end of the war, he returned to his studies at the Philadelphia College of Art. Waber graduated and earned his degree in 1951.

Upon graduation, Waber launched his career as a commercial artist. Soon after, he began illustrating and writing children's books. At the age of 28, Bernard married Ethel Bernstein, and the couple moved to New York City and had three children. When his children were young, Waber worked in the art department of Condé Nast Publications, writing his books at night and on the weekends. He later lived in Baldwin Harbor, New York.

== Writing ==
Waber wrote numerous children's books about the adventures of animals, including Do You See a Mouse?, Evie and Margie, An Anteater Named Arthur and A Lion Named Shirley Williamson. His Lyle series, started in 1962, was his most well-known set of children's books. In the books, Lyle is a city-dwelling crocodile that lives in a bathtub. Lyle's character brings joy to everyone he meets.

In 1954, Waber wrote his first illustrated book My Egg, Your Egg! by Eleanor Estes, published by G.P. Putnam's Sons.

Shortly after the attacks of September 11, 2001, Waber wrote the book Courage. In the book, through various characters, children are taught the meaning of bravery.

== Death ==
Waber died May 16, 2013, from kidney failure. At the time of his death, his publishing company, Houghton Mifflin Harcourt, said that his 33 books had sold a total of 1.75 million copies.
